= List of public art in Gresham, Oregon =

List of public artworks in Gresham, Oregon, U.S.

The American city of Gresham, Oregon's public art collection includes murals and sculptures.

== Murals ==
- Berry Harvest, Don Gray
- Main Street Mural

== Sculpture ==
- Blue, Heather Soderberg-Greene
- bronze Teddy Bear
- Crash
- Driscoll, Heather Soderberg-Greene
- Eclipse
- Family Ties
- Living Room (2001), Tamsie Ringler, installed at the Gresham Central Transit Center from 2001 to 2013
- Flying Together
- Nature and the Child
- Seeker the Raven, Rip and Chad Caswell
- Slide the Otter, Rip and Chad Caswell
- Statue of Todd Kirnan
- Strawberry
- Temples of the Air
- TriMet (1977), Robert Maki
- Throne
- Vintage Style Bike Rack
