= S48 =

S48 may refer to:

== Aviation ==
- Blériot-SPAD S.48, a French biplane airliner
- Country Squire Airpark in Clackamas County, Oregon, United States
- SABCA S-48, a Belgian aircraft
- Sikorsky S-48, an American helicopter

== Other uses ==
- S48 (New York City bus) serving Staten Island
- County Route S48 (Bergen County, New Jersey)
- HMS Conqueror (S48), a submarine of the Royal Navy
- S48: Keep wet with ... (appropriate material to be specified by the manufacturer), a safety phrase
- USS S-48 (SS-159), a submarine of the United States Navy
