= Country squire (disambiguation) =

Country squire may refer to:

- Country squire, a member of landed gentry in the UK
- Ford Country Squire, a car
- Country Squire, the album by American country musician Tyler Childers

== See also ==
- Country Squire Airpark, a public airport in Oregon, United States.
- Country Squire Lakes, an unincorporated community and census-designated place Indiana, United States.
