= Sandy High School =

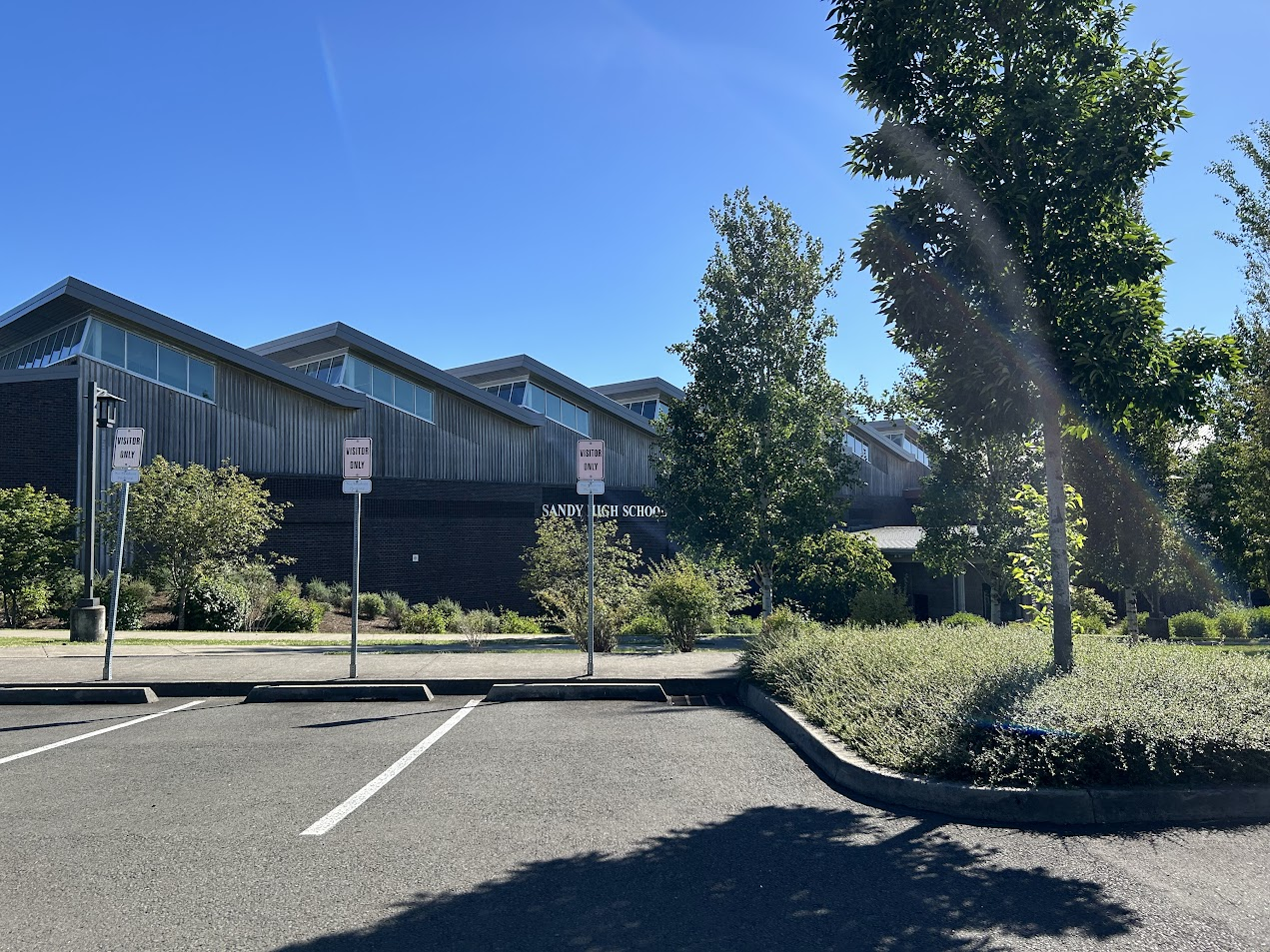

Location
- 37400 Bell Street; Sandy, Oregon, (Clackamas County) 97055; United States; 45.406°N 122.278°W

Information
- Former name: Sandy Union High School
- Type: Public
- Opened: 1917; 109 years ago
- School district: Oregon Trail S.D.
- Principal: Sarah Dorn
- Teaching staff: 58.89 (FTE)
- Grades: 9–12
- Enrollment: 1,420 (2024–2025)
- Student to teacher ratio: 24.11
- Colors: Black and crimson
- Mascot: Pioneer Pete
- Team name: Pioneers
- Newspaper: The Pioneer Press
- Yearbook: Meema
- Feeder schools: Boring Middle School; Cedar Ridge Middle School; Welches Middle School
- Website: Sandy High School

Sandy High School (SHS, formerly known as Sandy Union High School) is a public high school in the northwest United States, located in Sandy, Oregon, 30 miles (48 km) east of Portland. Originally located in a two-story schoolhouse in 1917, the high school was given its own standalone brick structure in 1923 to accommodate a growing student body as the Portland metropolitan area and surrounding cities expanded in population; that building is used now as Cedar Ridge Middle School.

The high school continued to expand throughout the 20th century, with numerous additions and exterior buildings being added to its campus (then located at 17100 Bluff Road). In 2008, voters approved an education bond enabling the construction of a new school building. The new building, constructed on a budget of $75 million, opened in September 2012, and features various updated and new technologies absent from the previous school, including a 500-seat auditorium, outdoor learning and vocational spaces, geothermal heating, and greywater recycling.

Since 1997, Sandy High School has been operated by the Oregon Trail School District, and is the district's only high school.

== History ==
Sandy Union High School was formally established in 1917, with the first graduating class consisting of 12 students, all of whom were female. Prior to this, in 1908, as the city of Sandy grew, a two-story schoolhouse had been established to accommodate students of all ages. By 1914, one room of the building's second floor was used exclusively for high school students.

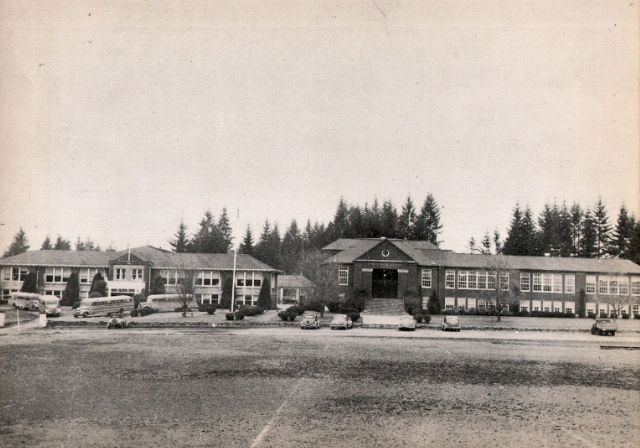
Sandy Union High School pictured in 1948

A local district election was held in 1921 regarding the allocation of a bond of $30,000 to construct a new building, but voters opposed the bond. However, in 1923, the bond was approved, and a two-story 12-classroom brick structure known as the Pioneer Building, was constructed for $30,000 (equivalent to $566,895 in 2025). It also contained a main office, a small gymnasium, and an assembly hall and stage. Following the passing of the Smith–Hughes Act, home economics and agriculture were added to the school's curriculum in 1926. In 1936, a second building was added to the campus in 1936 with funds donated by Ed and August Bruns.

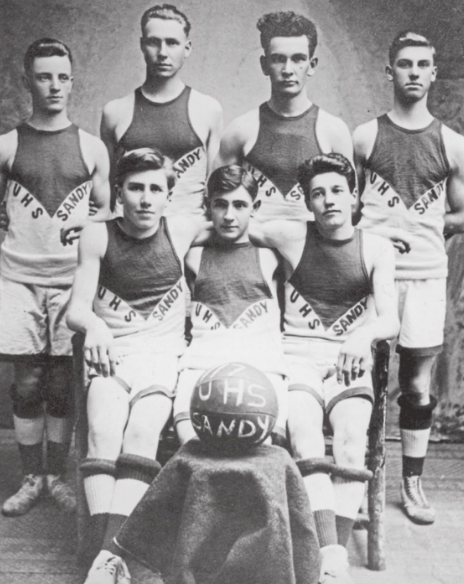
Boys' basketball team, 1917

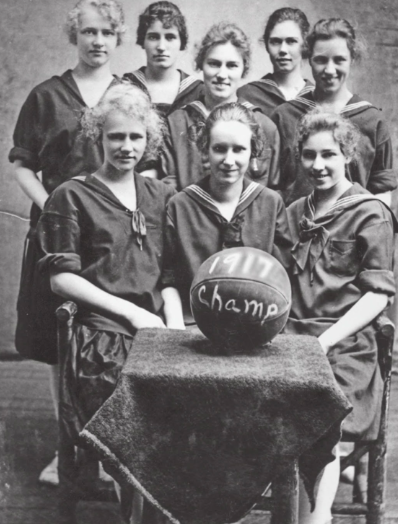
Girls' championship basketball team, 1917

Over the ensuing decades, exterior buildings and additions to the original brick structure were constructed to accommodate the increasing student body; the school was noted in 2006 for implementing a 32-camera surveillance system to ensure safety given the campus's numerous disconnected buildings. In 1984, the school implemented an integrated environmental science vocational program, which proved to be highly successful. In 1997, operations of the high school were taken over by the then-newly formed Oregon Trail School District.

In 2008, voters approved a $115-million education bond for Clackamas County, $75 million of which was sequestered to use for constructing a new high school. In September 2012, the school was officially relocated from its original location to the new campus, with the fall 2012 student body being the first to occupy the new school. The new school building is double the size of the previous one, with a performing arts center, 585-seat auditorium, career and technical education pod, and outdoor environmental learning area. It also utilizes geothermal heating and greywater recycling.

As of 2017, the Oregon Trail School district was undertaking renovations on the former high school building with plans to use it as a new location for Cedar Ridge Middle School.

== Student body ==
Sandy High School students at their graduation ceremony, 2024

According to the U.S. News & World Report, the student body of Sandy High School was 74.3% white, 17.2% Hispanic, 0.4% American Native or Alaskan Native, 0.4% African American, 1% Asian, 0.2% Pacific Islander, and 5.9% two or more races. 48% of the student body was female, with 52% male. The school has a student-teacher ratio of 27:1.

Sandy High School's student body is primarily made up of residents along the Mount Hood Corridor, a route connecting the Portland metropolitan area with the recreational facilities on Mount Hood, and in Kah-Nee-Ta and central Oregon.

== Academics ==
Sandy High School is unranked by U.S. News & World Report. 19% of students participate in the Advanced Placement (AP) program, and 59% of those participants passed at least one AP exam. The school's graduation rate is 71%.

Per 2018 data, the student body's proficiency in the subject of English was 20% above the state average. In mathematics, students performed at only 5% above the state level. Students' State Test Performance Index score was 79.9, 5.1 points above anticipated scores based on students' family incomes and levels of education. 46.5% of students from disadvantaged backgrounds scored proficiently on these tests, with 59.7% proficiency for non-disadvantaged students.

In 2015, students' mean average PSAT score was 1001.

== Athletics ==
The school's athletic teams are the Pioneers, and compete in the OSAA 6A-4 Mt. Hood Conference.

In July 2016, Sandy High School signed an athletic sponsorship deal with the locally headquartered Nike company.

== Notable alumni ==
- George Bruns, Academy Award-nominated Disney music composer
- Bill Johnson, World Cup alpine ski racer, Olympic gold medalist
- Brenda Strong, actress
- Mark Thorson, football quarterback

== Sources ==
- Bosserman, Dan (2015). Sandy. Images of America. Mount Pleasant, South Carolina: Arcadia Publishing. ISBN 978-1-467-13433-0.
