= Vanport =

Vanport may refer to:

Locations

- Vanport, Oregon
- Vanport Township, Beaver County, Pennsylvania

Companies

- Vanport Manufacturing, a logging company
