= William Boring =

William Boring may refer to:

- William A. Boring (1859–1937), American architect
- William H. Boring (1841–1932), American Union soldier and Oregon pioneer
