= Cedar Ridge Middle School =

Cedar Ridge Middle School may refer to:

- Cedar Ridge Middle School, a middle school in the Oregon Trail School District in the U.S. state of Oregon
- The former name for Austin Middle School in the Decatur City Schools school system in the U.S. state of Alabama
