= Oregon Trail School District =

School district in Oregon, United States

Address
- 36525 Southeast Industrial Way Sandy, Oregon, 97055; United States

District information
- Type: Public
- Motto: "Children thrive here"
- Grades: PreK–12
- Superintendent: Aaron Bayer
- NCES District ID: 4110890

Students and staff
- Students: 4,351
- Teachers: 189.28 (FTE)
- Staff: 210.59 (FTE)
- Student–teacher ratio: 22.99

Other information
- Website: www.oregontrailschools.com

The Oregon Trail School District (OTSD, OT46) is a public school district in Sandy, Oregon. It covers 424 square miles (or 1,100km²) of Clackamas County, Oregon, extending across Boring and Sandy to the surrounding areas of Mount Hood and the county's border.

== History ==
In 1997, OTSD was formed by the merging of six school districts; Bull Run, Boring, Cottrell, Sandy, Sandy Union, and Welches. This decision was most likely made due to Oregon Legislature ruling that all school districts needed to have a separate high school. The name came from the Oregon Trail, where the ending of it is in the area.

The district was named the eleventh best school district in Oregon by SchoolDigger in the 2023-24 school year.

== List of schools ==
Name	Location	Grades	Mascot	Enrollment
Boring Middle	Boring	6–8	Bear	430
Cedar Ridge Middle	Sandy	6–8	Mountaineer	433
Firwood Elementary	Sandy	K–5	Mustang	457
Kelso Elementary	Boring	K–5	Colt	348
Naas Elementary	Boring	K–5	Bear	327
Oregon Trail Academy	Cottrell	K–8	Timberwolf	N/A
Sandy Grade School	Sandy	PK–5	Bobcat	334
Sandy High School	Sandy	9–12	Pioneer	1,430
Welches Elementary	Mount Hood Village	K–5	Wildcat	188
Welches Middle	Mount Hood Village	6–8	Wildcat	74

== School Board ==
The board of directors consists of seven members, two elected at-large, and five elected by zone.

Zone	Name	Term ends
1, North Sandy	Gregg Chastain	2029
2, Boring	Marie Teune	2027
3, Welches	Paula Siverly (vice chair)	2029
4, South Sandy	Jeff Michael	2027
5, Cottrell/Bull Run	Robert Lee (chair)	2029
6, At Large	Jeffrey Grandi	2027
7, At Large	Randy Carmony	2029

== See also ==
- List of school districts in Oregon
