= Bob Amsberry =

American actor (1928–1957)

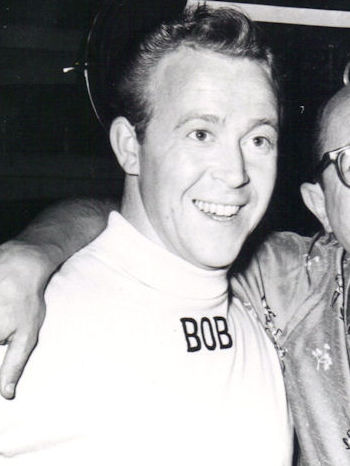
- Amsberry in 1955
- Born: Robert Wayne Amsberry; June 2, 1928; Boring, Oregon, U.S.
- Died: November 21, 1957 (aged 29); Portland, Oregon, U.S.
- Occupations: Actor, writer

Robert Wayne Amsberry (June 2, 1928 – November 21, 1957) was an American actor, and one of the original cast members on the first two seasons of Walt Disney's The Mickey Mouse Club, working as both a writer and actor. Amsberry also worked as a voice actor, with a posthumous credit in Disney's Sleeping Beauty (1959).

== Early life ==
Amsberry was born in 1928 in the small town of Boring, Oregon, the third child of Ernest and Cassie Amsberry. Amsberry graduated from Franklin High School in Portland, where he was a friend and classmate of Johnnie Ray. Amsberry was musically inclined from a young age, and in 1954, began an entertainment radio program in Portland titled Uncle Bob's Squirrel Cage on the KEX radio station.

== Career ==
Amsberry's friend, George Bruns, whom he had grown up with in Oregon, worked as an acclaimed film composer for Walt Disney Studios in Los Angeles, and invited Amsberry to join the Disney studio department in 1955.

Amsberry worked on The Mickey Mouse Club, a then-new series, writing skits as well as acting on the show in various characters. Bob-O, a clown character played by Amsberry on the series, became a minor celebrity, and the character was featured as a live character impersonator at the Disneyland theme park. Bill Walsh maintained Amsberry's contract with Disney until September 1957, and Amsberry appeared on Disney's Hardy Boys television serial installment Mystery of Ghost Farm, which premiered on September 13, 1957. His voice work also appears in Sleeping Beauty (1959) as one of Maleficent's goons.

On the morning of November 21, 1957, Amsberry was involved in a car accident as a passenger with Roy Williams, another Disney employee, in Portland. Amsberry died of injuries sustained in the accident. Roy Williams, a known drinker, was implicated but other local sources claim Amsberry was the driver, alone, not a passenger, and went off a cliff; he went through a utility pole and the pole impaled him and his vehicle.

== Filmography ==
Year	Title	Role	Notes
1955-57	The Mickey Mouse Club	Uncle Bob; various	Television series
1957	The Hardy Boys: Mystery on the Ghost Farm	Farmer Sam	Television series
1958	Paul Bunyan	Joe Muffaw	Voice, Uncredited, Released posthumously
1959	Sleeping Beauty	Maleficent's Goon	Voice, Uncredited, Released posthumously
