= Statue of Todd Kirnan =

Bronze statue in Gresham, Oregon, U.S.

- The statue in 2023
- Artist: Heather Soderberg
- Medium: Bronze sculpture
- Subject: Todd Kirnan
- Location: Gresham, Oregon, U.S.; 45°29′59″N 122°25′50.5″W

A bronze sculpture of Todd Kirnan by Heather Soderberg was installed in Gresham, Oregon, in September 2018. The life-size statue at Northeast Third and Main Street honors Kirnan, an autistic delivery man nicknamed "Mister Gresham". It depicts Kirnan wearing a Portland Trail Blazers jersey with the number 22 for Clyde Drexler. The artwork cost approximately $54,000 and was funded by private donations from community members. The statue's dedicated was accompanied with a parade attended by hundreds.

== See also ==
- List of public art in Gresham, Oregon
