= Dull, Perth and Kinross =

Village in Perth and Kinross, Scotland

Coordinates: 56.618498°N 3.947334°W

Dull: Scottish Gaelic: Dul
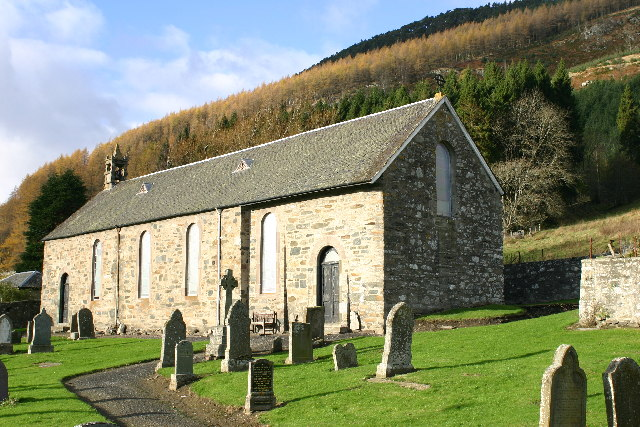
- The Dull church

- Location within Perth and Kinross
- OS grid reference: NN806491
- Council area: Perth and Kinross
- Lieutenancy area: Perthshire
- Country: Scotland
- Sovereign state: United Kingdom
- Post town: ABERFELDY
- Postcode district: PH15
- Dialling code: 01887
- Police: Scotland
- Fire: Scottish
- Ambulance: Scottish
- UK Parliament: Angus and Perthshire Glens
- Scottish Parliament: Perthshire North

Dull (Scottish Gaelic: Dul, pronounced [t̪ul̪ˠ]) is a village in Perth and Kinross, Scotland. It is paired with Boring, Oregon. Bland, New South Wales, Australia, is also a member of the League of Extraordinary Communities established by Boring and Dull in 2013.

== Orientation ==
In the Scottish Highlands, Dull consists of a single street of houses on the north side of the valley of the River Tay.

== Etymology and translations ==
The name Dull may be Pictish in origin and derived from the word *dol meaning "water-meadow, haugh" (Welsh dôl). This would be cognate with the Gaelic dail meaning a meadow, but the modern Gaelic name of the town, from which the English is taken is "Dul", or "An Dul".

== History ==
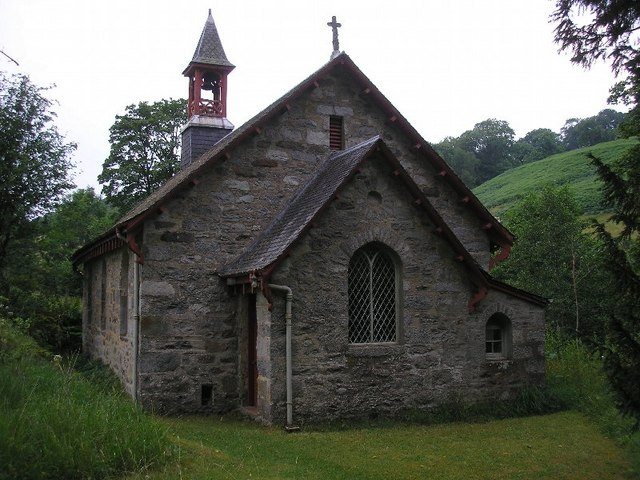
Fincastle Chapel

The parish church is on the site of an early Christian monastery founded by St Adomnán (Scottish Gaelic: N. Eònan), Abbot of Iona (died 704). Several early Christian cross-slabs dating to the 7th or 8th century have been discovered in and around the parish graveyard. A slab carved with stylised warriors and horsemen in the Pictish style, uncovered during grave-digging in the 19th century, is displayed in the Museum of Scotland, and may have formed part of a wall-relief, or one side of a box-shrine. A massive font of rough workmanship, preserved by the church door, is also a probable relic from the early monastic site.

The surrounding district was known as the Appin of Dull, the name deriving from Old Irish apdaine ("abbacy") referring to the former monastic estate, as with Appin in Argyll, the abbey lands in that case being those of the major early Christian monastery of Lismore. Four undecorated crosses, of which three survive, one at Dull itself, and two in the nearby old church at Weem, once stood around the monastic precinct, defining an area of sanctuary.

From the later Middle Ages to modern times, the church at Dull was a parish church in the Diocese of Dunkeld. It is not known when the early Christian monastery ceased to function.

In decline for much of the 20th century, with its church and school both going out of use, the small village has seen the construction of several new houses, and the restoration of older buildings, in the 21st century.

== Population ==
In 1951, Dull had a population of 2,055 (this was for an extensive parish stretching a long way beyond the village). As of 2012, the population of Dull was approximately 84.

== Twin towns ==
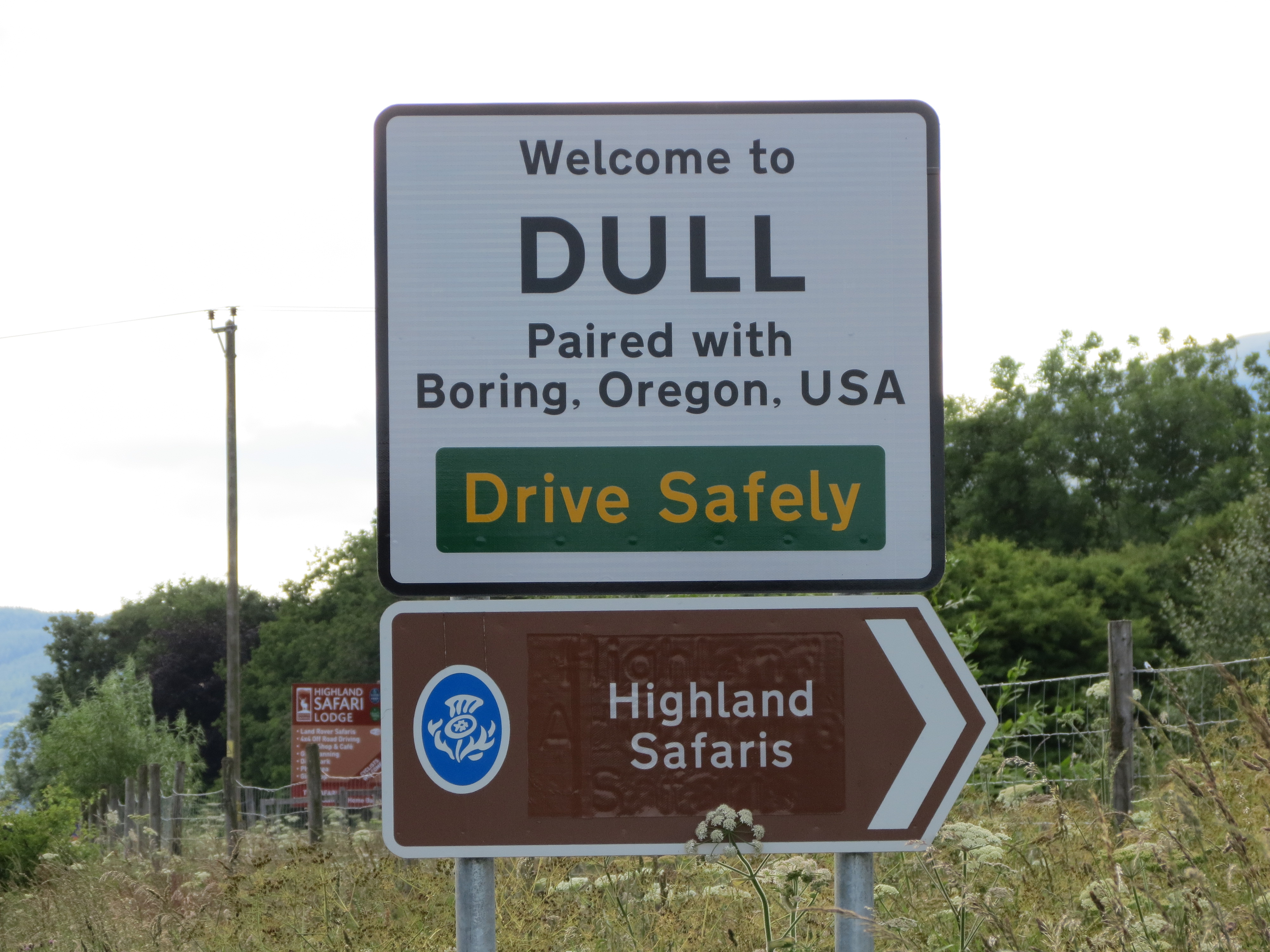
Twinning sign at Dull

Dull is twinned with:

- (United States) Boring, Oregon, since 2012.
- Bland, New South Wales, Australia

Elizabeth Leighton of Aberfeldy, Scotland, proposed the pairing with Boring, Oregon, while passing through the unincorporated town on the highway from Portland, Oregon, to Mount Hood on a cycling holiday. In June 2012, Boring, Oregon, accepted the proposal to "pair" their municipalities, in an effort to promote tourism in both places as a play on their names. The Boring Community Planning Organization (CPO) issued commemorative "Boring & Dull: a pair for the ages" T-shirts and mugs, raffling off a trip to Dull, Scotland. The Boring CPO will not attempt to get the pairing recognised by the US-based Sister Cities International.

Dull and Boring celebrations are held annually on August 9 in Oregon with a piper and a barbershop quartet; the Dull celebrations are in October.

Bland Shire, West Wyalong—a farm community and former gold prospecting site in New South Wales, Australia—joined the initiative in 2013, creating not a "twinned town" relationship but a League of Extraordinary Communities to group Dull, Boring and Bland. The group became known as the "Trinity of Tedium".

In January 2026, the Vienna Tourist Board invited Dull residents for an expenses-paid weekend in the Austrian capital. They were asked to review Vienna's tourist offerings and decide whether Vienna really deserves its reputation for being “a bit dull” in January. By the time the 33 residents returned to Dull, the verdict was unanimous. Vienna, even in January, had far exceeded expectations.
