= Kelso, Oregon =

Unincorporated community in the state of Oregon, United States

- Unincorporated community
- Location within Oregon Location within the United States
- Coordinates: 45°25′06″N 122°18′29″W
- Country: United States
- State: Oregon
- County: Clackamas
- Elevation: 709 ft (216 m)
- Time zone: UTC-8 (Pacific (PST))
  - Summer (DST): UTC-7 (PDT)
- ZIP code: 97009
- Area codes: 503 and 971
- GNIS feature ID: 1122680

Kelso is an unincorporated community located about three miles northwest of Sandy in Clackamas County, Oregon, United States. It was named for the town of Kelso, Washington. The post office operated for ten years, from May 31, 1894 to May 26, 1904.
