= Mark Thorson =

American football player (born 1983)

No. 7
- Position: Quarterback

Personal information
- Born: July 19, 1983 (age 43)
- Listed height: 6 ft 6 in (1.98 m)
- Listed weight: 240 lb (109 kg)

Career information
- High school: Sandy (Sandy, Oregon)
- College: Western Oregon (2004–2007)
- NFL draft: 2008: undrafted

Career history
- Boise Burn (2009); Utah Blaze (2010)

Career AFL statistics
- Comp. / Att.: 52 / 90
- Passing yards: 577
- TD–INT: 11–4
- QB rating: 88.98
- Rushing TDs: 1
- Stats at ArenaFan.com

Mark Thorson (born July 19, 1983) is an American former professional football quarterback who played one season with the Utah Blaze of the Arena Football League (AFL). He played college football at Western Oregon University. He was also a member of the Boise Burn of the af2.

== Early life ==
Thorson attended Sandy High School in Sandy, Oregon.

== College career ==
Thorson played for the Western Oregon Wolves from 2004 to 2007. He helped his team to a 20–12 record as a three-year starter and set school records with 987 pass attempts, 568 pass completions, 60 passing touchdowns and 63 total touchdowns.

== Professional career ==
Thorson signed with the Boise Burn of the af2 in December 2008. He finished the 2009 regular season with four touchdowns and one interception for 165 yards while completing 17 of 31 passes in four games, giving him a QB rating of 88.78.

Thorson was assigned to the Utah Blaze of the Arena Football League (AFL) on June 1, 2010. He played in eight games during the 2010 AFL season, recording 11 touchdowns and four interceptions on 577 passing yards. On September 9, 2010, he was assigned to the Blaze again for the 2011 AFL season. Thorson was placed on reassignment on November 29, 2010. Nearly a year later, on October 18, 2011, he was assigned to the Blaze for the 2012 AFL season. However, he was placed on reassignment again on December 16, 2011.
