= Jonsrud Viewpoint =

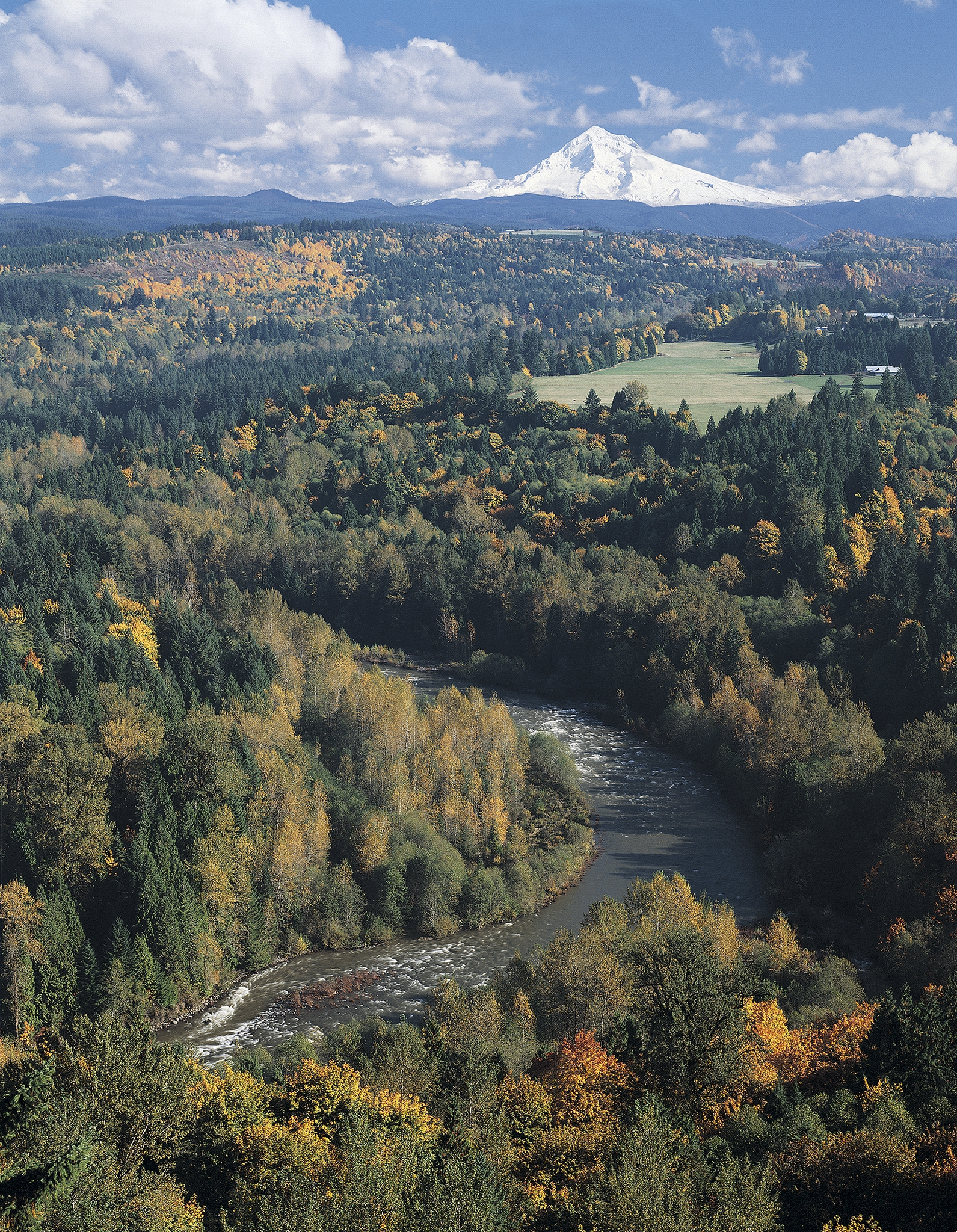
- Jonsrud Viewpoint with Mount Hood in background and the Sandy River in the foreground
- Organization: City of Sandy, Oregon
- Location: SE Bluff Road, Sandy, Oregon, U.S.
- Coordinates: 45.410288°N 122.273508°W
- Altitude: 856.2 feet (261.0 m)

Jonsrud Viewpoint is a viewpoint located in the city of Sandy in the U.S. state of Oregon. The viewpoint offers telescopes and expansive views of Mount Hood and the Sandy River Valley, as well as the "Devil's Backbone," a ridge named by pioneers who were traveling on the Barlow Trail. The site has been considered one of the "best views in Oregon."

== History ==
The viewpoint was named after Phil Jonsrud, a local historian in the city of Sandy. Jonsrud, born in Kelso, was a war veteran who also spent time in New York City, though lived the majority of his life in Sandy. The offramp at the viewpoint was paved by the Jonsrud family.

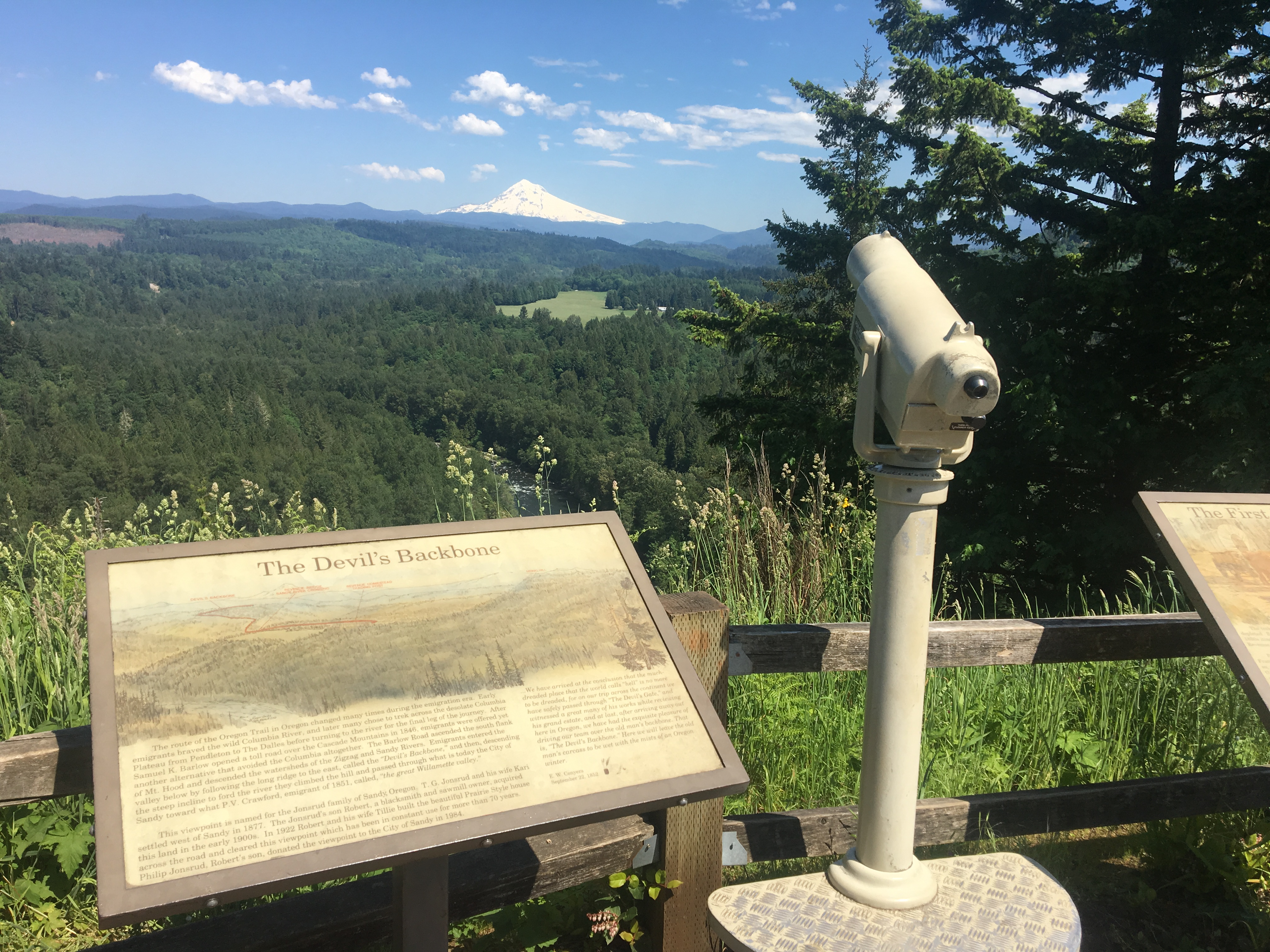
Jonsrud Viewpoint
