= Living Room (sculpture) =

Sculpture in Gresham, Oregon, U.S.

- Artist: Tamsie Ringler
- Year: 2001
- Type: Sculpture
- Medium: Mosaic; cast bronze; concrete; glass; iron
- Subject: Living room
- Location: Gresham, Oregon, United States; 45.50278°N 122.42670°W

Living Room was an outdoor 2001 sculpture by Tamsie Ringler, installed at the Gresham Central Transit Center in Gresham, Oregon, United States.

== Description and history ==
Living Room was created by Tamsie Ringler, a Mt. Hood Community College visual arts instructor and resident of Sandy, Oregon. It was installed as a permanent art installation at the Gresham Central Transit Center at Northeast Eighth Street and Kelly Avenue in 2001. The sculpture was the first east Multnomah County artwork commissioned by TriMet's Public Art Program and Ringler's first publicly funded art commission. Ringler began working on the sculpture two years earlier. Her work was chosen by TriMet's Public Art Advisory Committee from three finalists. TriMet spokesperson Mary Fetsch said, "When the eastside line was built, we didn't have an art committee. It's been really nice that as we add new features to the line that we also add art. It's also great that we had local artists and students working on it. We think it really reflects the community."

The installation featured a pink couch, a concrete high-backed yellow chair, a bronze coffee table, and a "hypnotically glowing" television set. The furniture pieces were set on a tile mosaic rug displaying images associated with east Multnomah County, including the east wind, the Mt. Hood Jazz Festival, and a snowboarder. The tile mosaic, started in February 2000, required more than 2,000 hours to finish and was assembled by 50 students and volunteers. Living Room also included a permanently lit black iron floor lamp. According to Willamette Week, the installation became "notorious as a local party spot for teenagers and twentysomethings", attracting "young (and often intoxicated) people to use it as an actual living room". In 2012, Willamette Week's Aaron Mesh described the people he encountered at the site during his three-day, nearly 250-mile experience on public transit.

TriMet removed the sculpture in late October 2013, twelve years after its installation, due to loitering teenagers. Fetsch said, "the artwork has raised safety and security concerns since 2008 ... The work became physically degraded and was fully restored in 2010. Three years later, the artwork is again in disrepair and the plaza area remains a safety concern." It was returned to Ringler after being dismantled.

== Reception ==
Following the sculpture's installation, Anne Endicott of Gresham's newspaper The Outlook wrote, "It's always comforting when someone leaves the light on at home. Living Room ... does just that as it welcomes residents home day and night."

== See also ==
- 2001 in art
- Street furniture
