= Sandy Area Metro =

Transit system in Sandy, Oregon, US

- Founded: 1999
- Locale: Sandy, Oregon
- Service type: transit bus
- Routes: 3
- Website: Sandy Transit

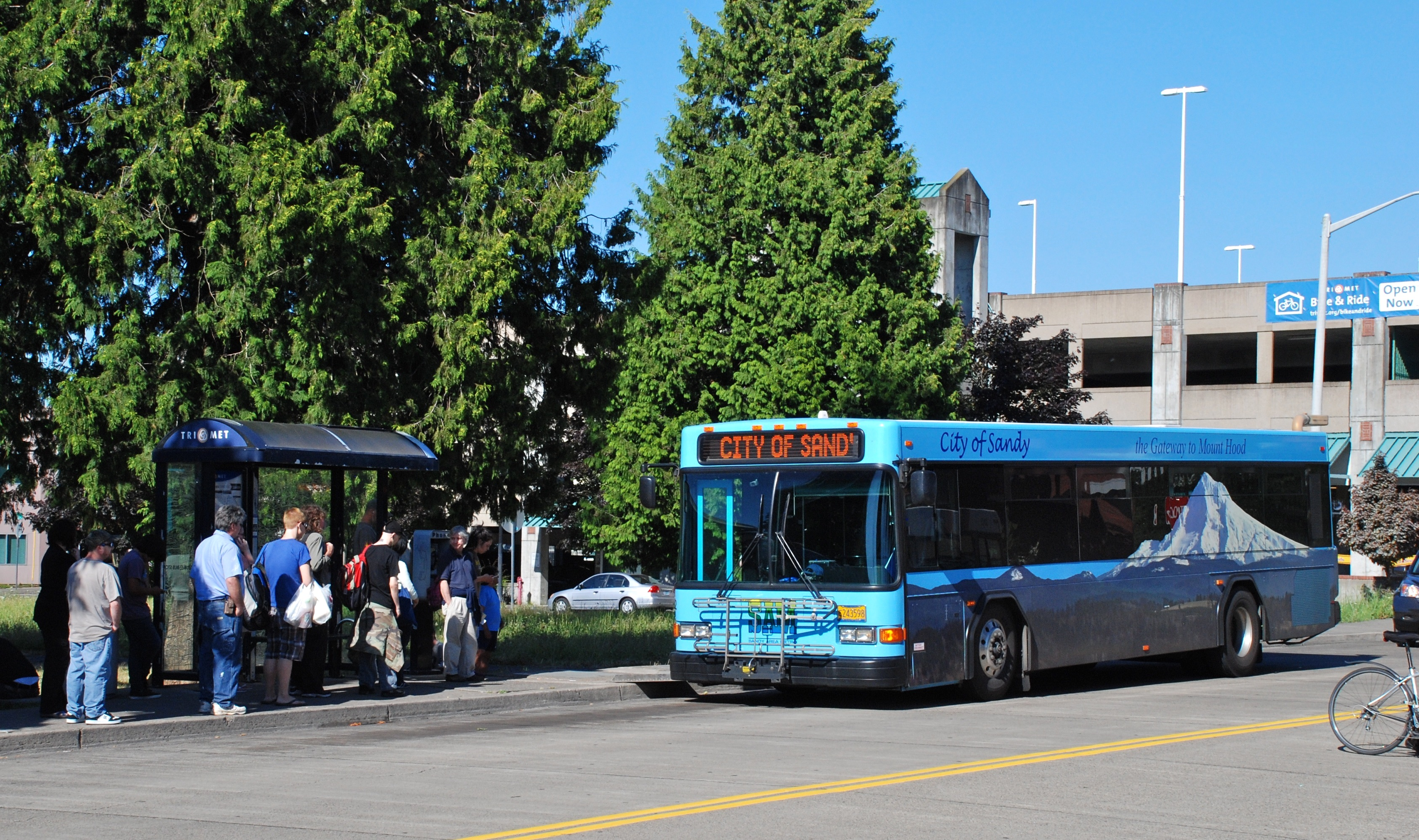
A SAM bus at TriMet's Gresham Transit Center

Sandy Area Metro (called SAM) is a public transit system operated by the city government of Sandy, Oregon. SAM was created after the city successfully petitioned to be removed from the TriMet district in the late 1990s. The name was chosen in July 1999, and service began operating on January 4, 2000. The local transit provider gave its one-millionth ride on November 21, 2006, and began its twentieth year in January 2019. SAM maintains three routes, a dial-a-ride service called Sandy Transit Area Rides (STAR), and an Elderly and Disabled (ED) medical rides program.

The SAM-Gresham route provides service seven days a week, to the Gresham Transit Center, where riders can use TriMet to travel to the Portland metropolitan area. SAM-Estacada, a Monday-Saturday service, runs four times a day to and from Estacada. These routes also connect to the Mount Hood Express bus service from Sandy to Government Camp and Timberline. The in-town Shopping Shuttle operates Monday-Friday circulating the business corridor enabling citizens greater access to goods and services. STAR operates Monday-Saturday and ED is available weekdays. To reduce congestion and increase access to city events special routes are occasionally added. All vehicles are ADA accessible with low floors, ramps and wheelchair lifts. All SAM service within the city limits is free and out of town rides are $1.00 each way. Rides on the STAR on-demand route are $1.00 each way. ED rides are $2.00 each way and one caregiver may ride free. 24-Trip passes may be purchased for $20.00 and monthly passes, providing unlimited rides, can be purchased for $30.00. SAM and Mt. Hood Express have a combination all day pass for $5.00. SAM bus services are funded by state and federal grants as well as a modest business tax. HB217 has provided an additional source of revenue that will allow for expansion of service.

SAM has a Transit Advisory Board that meets quarterly and is open to the public. Residents of Sandy are encouraged to attend meetings as participate as members of the board. The board directs staff on the plans and goals to ensure accountability and transparency. Information on becoming a board member is available on the website along with historical minutes. As of September 2019 all meetings will be broadcast via YouTube.

== Routes ==
- Sandy–Gresham Express
- Sandy–Estacada
- Shopper Shuttle

== See also ==
- Transportation in Portland, Oregon
