= TriMet (sculpture) =

Sculpture in Gresham, Oregon, U.S.

- The sculpture in 2023
- Artist: Robert Maki
- Year: 1977
- Type: Sculpture
- Medium: Aluminum
- Location: Gresham, Oregon, United States; 45°30′51″N 122°23′44″W

TriMet (stylized as TRIMET) is an outdoor 1977 aluminum sculpture by American artist Robert Maki, installed on the Mount Hood Community College campus in Gresham, Oregon, United States. According to the Regional Arts & Culture Council, which administers the work, "TRIMET serves as an excellent example of how Maki's technical background is reflected in his work. The sculpture is built of geometric shapes that evolve and morph as the viewer moves around it, using negative space to help define the mass of the sculpture itself." It measures 8 ft × 9.25 ft × 4 ft (2.44 m × 2.82 m × 1.22 m) and was funded by TriMet and the United States Department of Transportation.

== See also ==
- 1977 in art
- Trapezoid E (1975), Eugene, Oregon
