= Boring, Oregon =

Unincorporated community in Oregon, US

Boring
- Unincorporated community
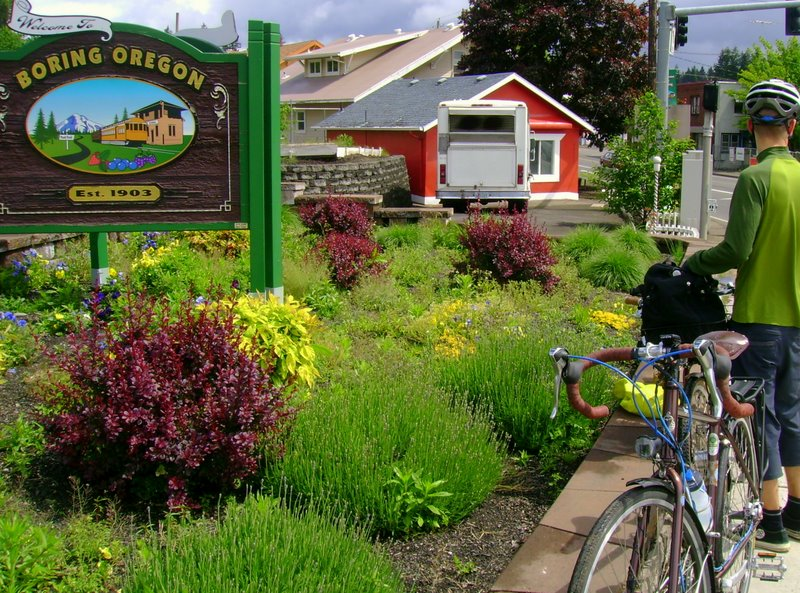
- Cyclists at the west entrance to Boring on Oregon Route 212
- Motto: "The most exciting place to live!"
- Location within the state of Oregon Boring (the United States)
- Coordinates: 45°25′50″N 122°22′18″W
- Country: United States
- State: Oregon
- County: Clackamas
- Settled: 1856
- Platted: 1903
- Named for: William Harrison Boring

Area
  - Total: 30.0 sq mi (77.7 km^{2})
- Elevation: 505 ft (154 m)
- Time zone: UTC-8 (Pacific (PST))
  - Summer (DST): UTC-7 (PDT)
- ZIP Codes: 97009
- Area codes: 503 and 971
- GNIS feature ID: 2805447
- Sister cities: Dull, Scotland; Bland, Australia

Boring is an unincorporated community and census-designated place (CDP) in Clackamas County, Oregon, United States. It is located along Oregon Route 212 in the foothills of the Cascade mountain range, approximately twelve miles (19 km) southeast of downtown Portland and fourteen miles (23 km) northeast of Oregon City. Boring is named after William Harrison Boring, a Union soldier and pioneer whose family built a farm in the area in 1856, before Oregon had received statehood. Boring's scenic, rural farming environment combined with its proximity to Portland have been noted as attributions to its status as a commuter town or bedroom community, where residents commute to the nearby city for employment.

The community was officially platted in 1903 after the Portland Railway, Light and Power Company constructed an electric rail line, which operated from Portland to Cazadero. The former railway is now part of the Springwater Corridor, a rail trail which begins in Boring and ends at the Eastbank Esplanade along the Willamette River in southeast Portland. The Boring Lava Field, an extinct volcanic field zone that comprises terrain extending from Boring to downtown Portland, took its name from the community.

Boring was a hub of the timber industry in the Pacific Northwest prior to and during World War I due to the abundance of surrounding temperate coniferous and evergreen forests, as well as its proximity to the Port of Portland. In addition to logging, plant nurseries and agriculture have also historically been major economic forces in Boring.

Boring has often been included in lists of places with unusual names. In 2012, Boring was named a sister city of the village of Dull, Scotland, and later joined Bland, Australia, in the "Trinity of Tedium."

== History ==
=== Timeline ===
The land on which Boring was built was a former lava field. The Boring Lava Field, which takes its namesake from the community, is located just north of Boring. There are approximately 80 lava vents across the area, remnants of the volcanic activity that occurred there roughly 2.6 million years ago. The lava field extends across surrounding Portland and Vancouver, Washington, though the volcanic centers are extinct. The land that would later become Boring had no known inhabitants, though the Clackamas Tribe had a camp located south of Boring, near present-day Oregon City, along the Willamette River. By 1855, the remaining members of the tribe had relocated to the Grand Ronde. Settlers began to arrive in the Oregon Territory in mid-1800s via the Oregon Trail, after the establishment of Portland.

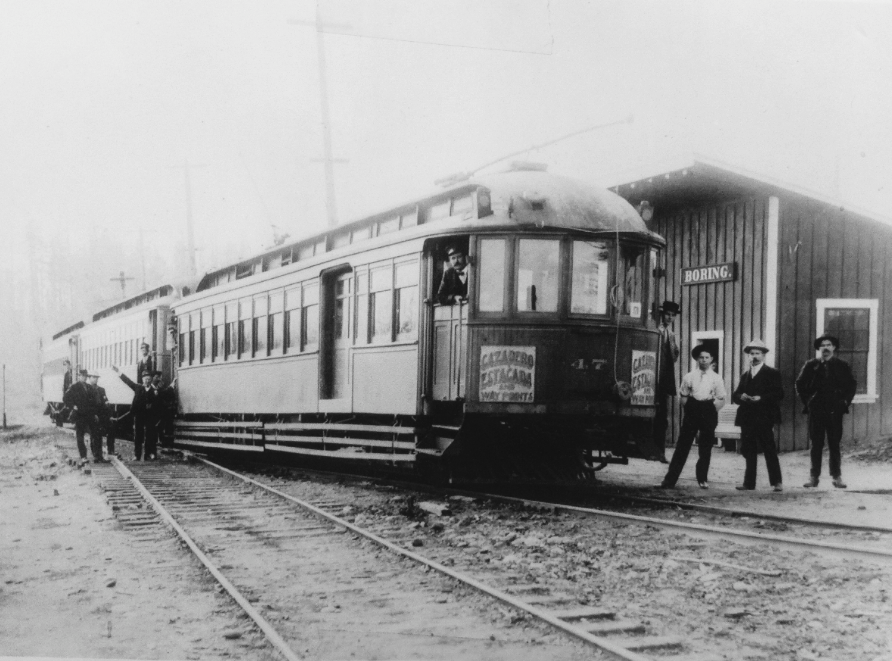
Boring station on the Portland Railway, Light and Power Company line, c. 1904

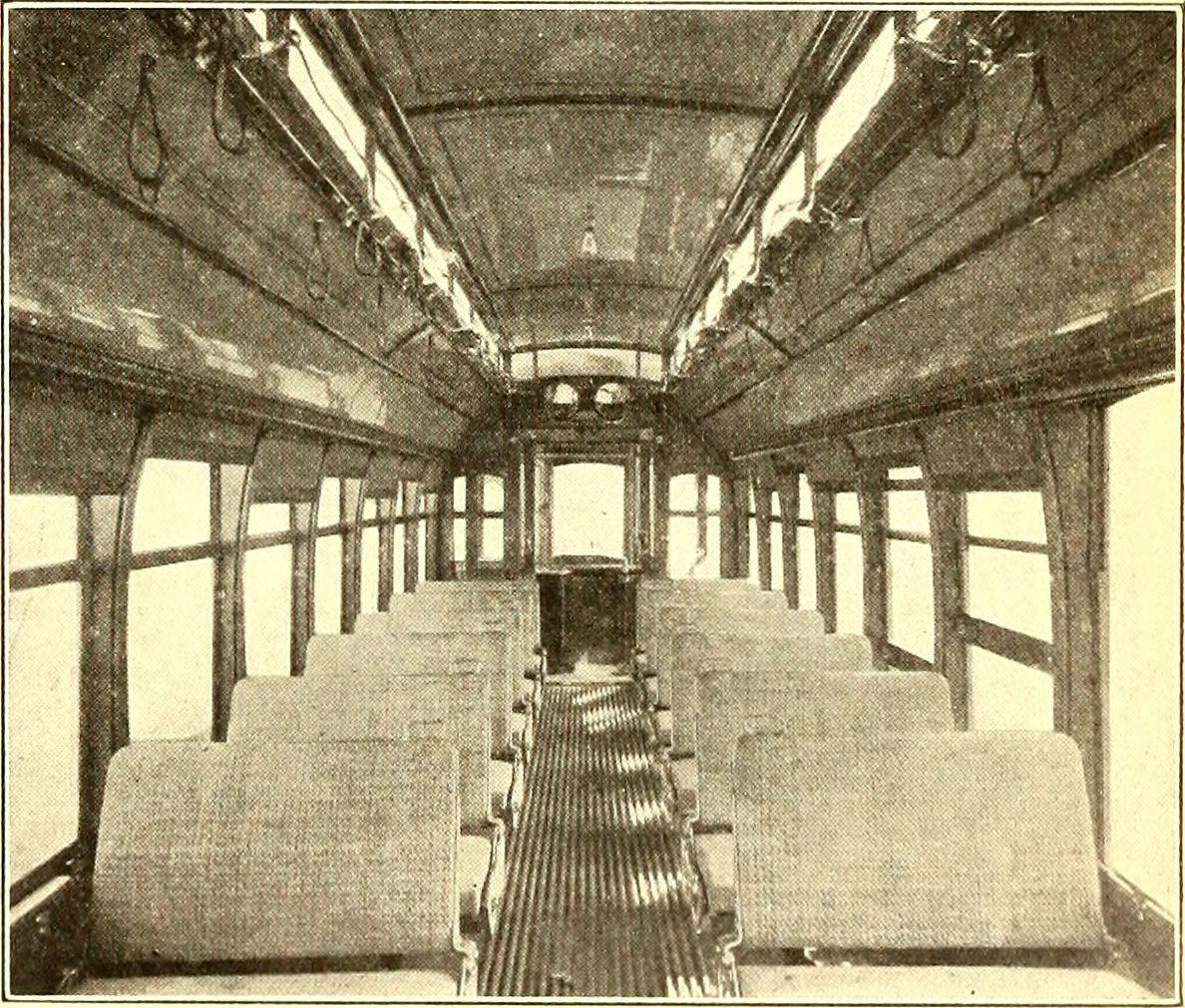
Interior of trains operating through Boring, 1907

Boring takes its name after William Harrison Boring, an Illinois native and early resident who began farming there in 1874, and subsequently donated land for the community's first schoolhouse to be built. He was a Union veteran who had moved to Oregon after having fought in the Siege of Vicksburg during the Civil War. William's half-brother, Joseph, had settled in the area in 1856 prior to his arrival.

Boring was platted in 1903 as Boring Junction after the construction of a railway line by the Portland Railway, Light and Power Company. The post office was established and named Boring the same year, which builders of an interurban railway adopted as the name of the community. An electric trolley operated on the railroad line from Portland through Gresham and Boring, ending in Cazadero, which began transporting passengers in 1905. The trolley significantly reduced travel time between Portland and the communities to its east: Horse and buggy travel from Boring to Portland took an average of six hours, while a trip to Portland via the trolley system took only one hour. Though younger students in the area attended a local school built on Richey Road, high school students in Boring commuted via trolley to Gresham and Portland to attend high schools there. The early residents of the area post-settlement were mainly German and Swedish immigrants.

After World War II and the prominence of automobile ownership, the trolley ceased passenger operations to Portland, but continued to travel between Boring and Gresham. The railway went defunct in the following years, and was incorporated as part of the Springwater Corridor, a rail trail that begins in Boring and ends at the Eastbank Esplanade in downtown Portland.

In 2005, citizens of Boring applied to become one of the first legally recognized villages in Oregon. However, after many months of polarizing debate on the village issue, residents narrowly defeated the village designation in a town hall referendum in August 2006, with 293 votes in favor and 298 against.

=== Name and municipality pairings ===
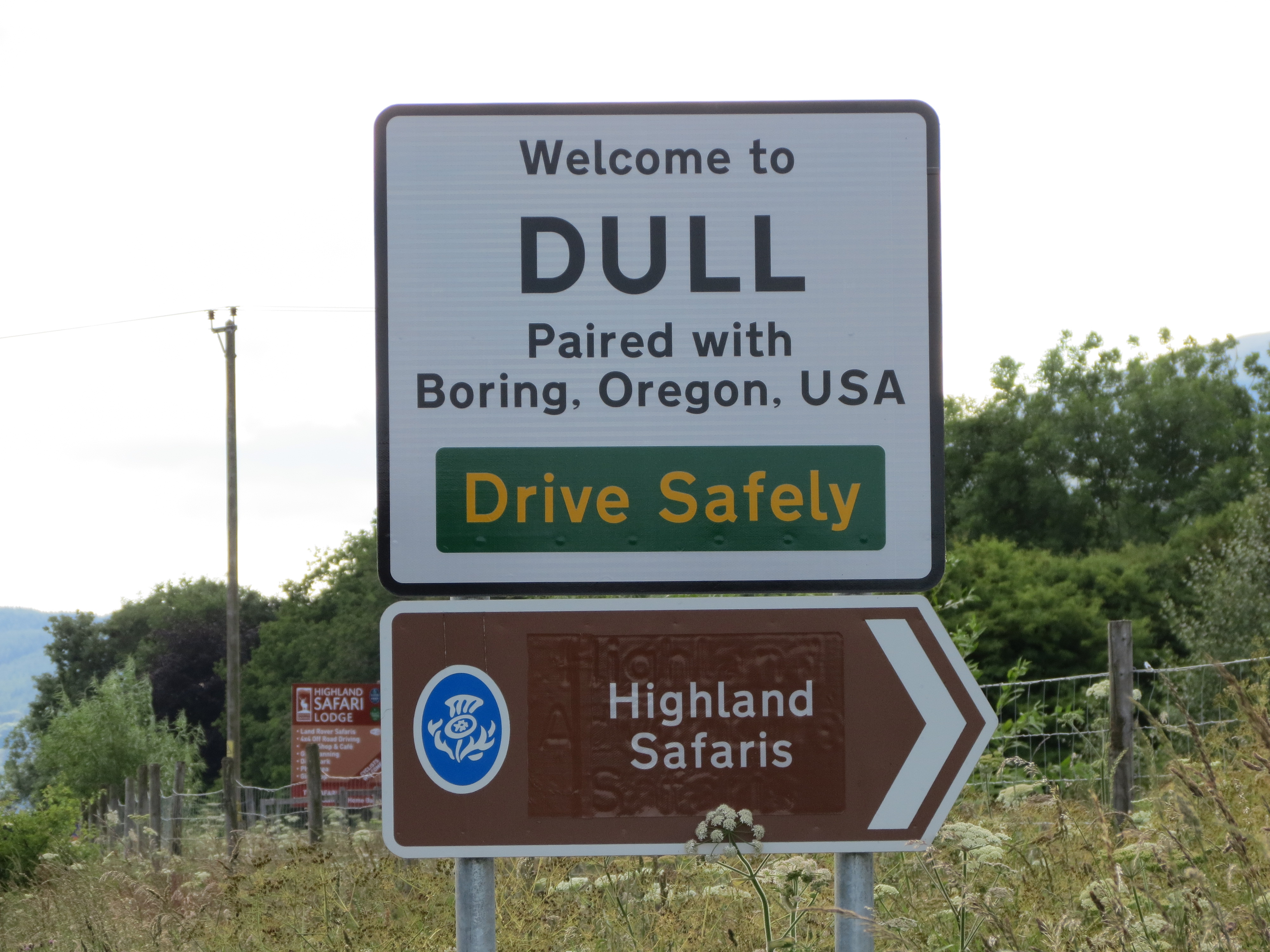
Sign in Dull, Scotland

The unusual name of the community often prompts its inclusion on lists of unusual place names. The name "Boring" is embraced by locals, however, and found in many local businesses, resulting in many road signs that seem humorous to outsiders. Boosters of the village designation use the slogan "The most exciting place to live."

In 2011, Elizabeth Leighton of Aberfeldy, Scotland, proposed the community's pairing with the village of Dull, Scotland, after passing through Boring on a cycling holiday. In June 2012, Boring accepted the proposal of Dull to "pair" their municipalities, in an effort to promote tourism in both places as a play on their names. Dull is a village of only 84 residents, while Boring has about 8,000.

In 2013, the farm community and former gold prospecting site Bland Shire in West Wyalong, New South Wales, Australia was added to the mix to create not a "twinned town" relationship but a "League of Extraordinary Communities" grouping Dull, Boring, and Bland as a means of encouraging travel, promoting all three communities. The same year, construction of the Boring Station Trailhead Park was completed on the empty lot that once housed the original 1903 train station, and opened to the public. The Boring Community Planning Organization also issued commemorative "Boring & Dull: a pair for the ages" T-shirts and mugs, as well as raffling off a trip to Dull.

== Geography ==
=== Topography ===
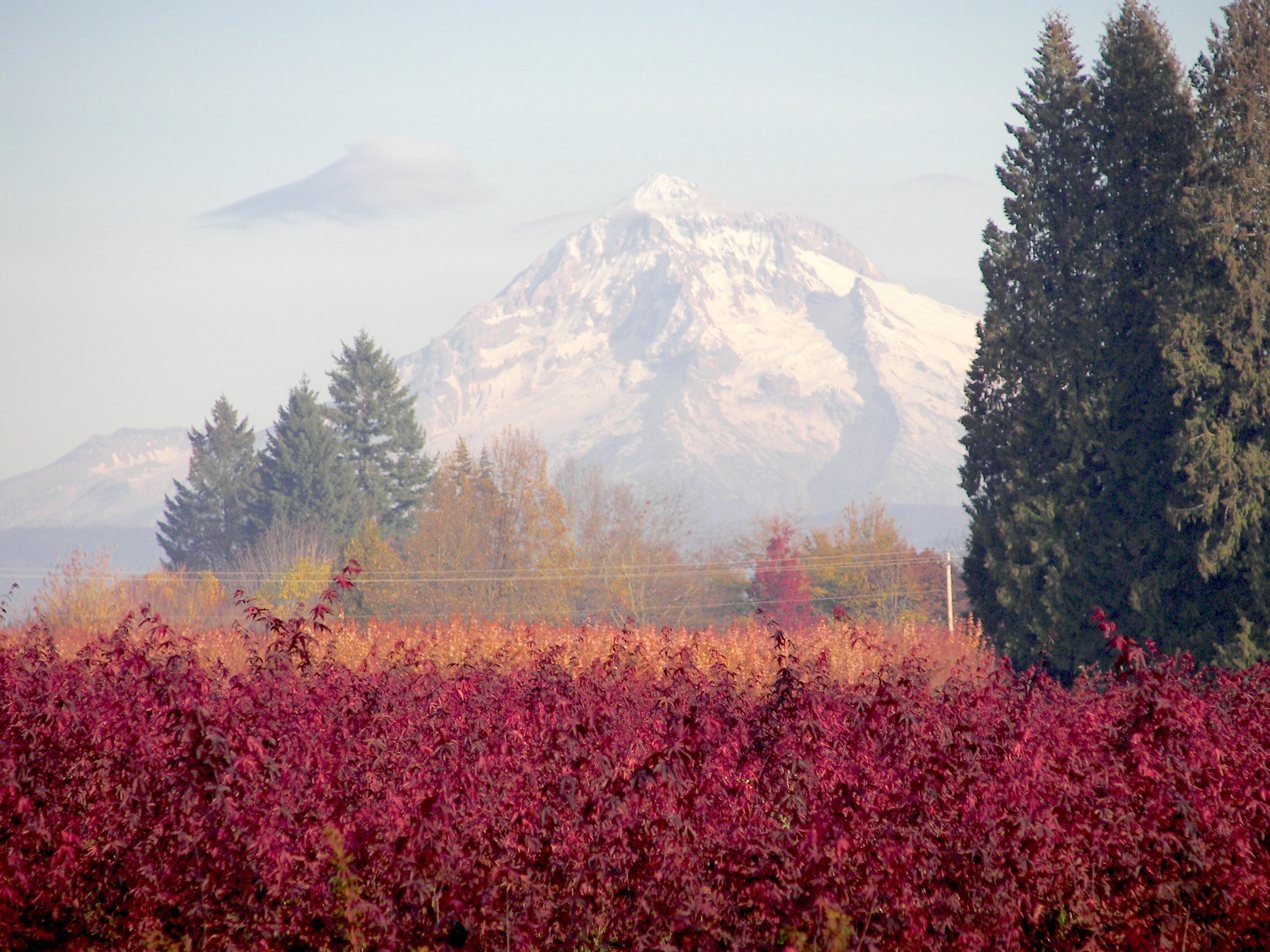
View of Mount Hood from Boring

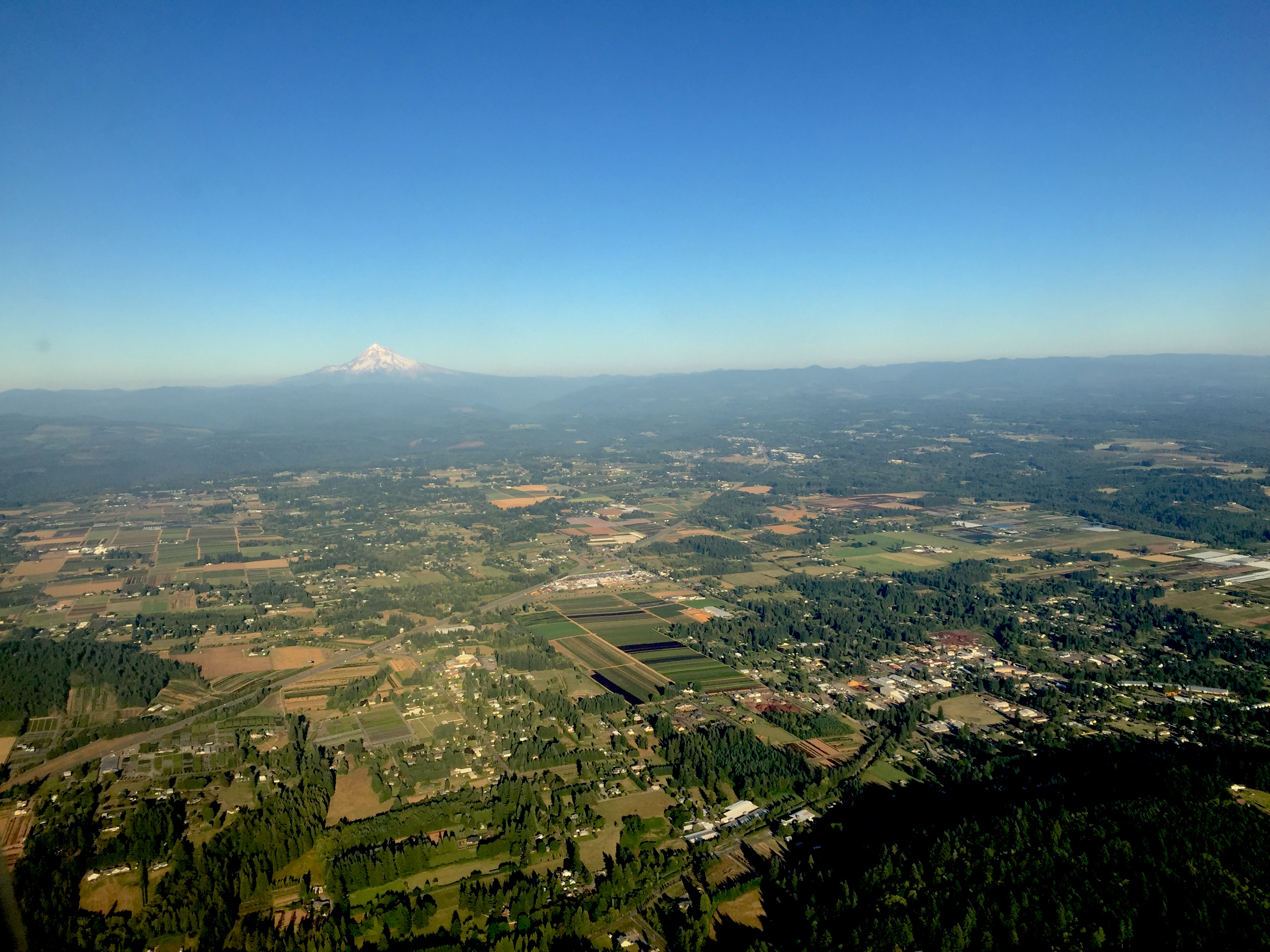
Aerial view of Boring and surrounding area, with Mount Hood in the background

Located at the northernmost end of the eastern Willamette Valley, Boring rests in the foothills of the Cascade mountain range, at the base of Mount Hood. The community is approximately 31 miles (50 km) from Government Camp, a major resort and skiing community on Mount Hood. The community comprises approximately 30 square miles (78 km^{2}) of Clackamas County. Boring is considered part of the Portland metropolitan area, located approximately 12 miles (19 km) southeast of the Portland city limits, and 16 miles (26 km) from downtown Portland.

Boring's landscape is hilly, with its elevation ranging between 548 feet (167 m) and 755 feet (230 m). Several creeks run west through the community limits into the Clackamas River, including Doane Creek, North Fork Deep Creek, and Tickle Creek.

=== Climate ===
According to the Köppen climate classification, Boring has a warm-summer Mediterranean climate, characterized by warm, dry summers and cool, rainy winters. The community receives an annual average of 54.26 inches (1,378 mm) of rain—significantly more than neighboring Portland, which averages 36.03 inches (915 mm), or Gresham, which averages 44.85 inches (1,139 mm). Boring's high volume of rainfall can be attributed to its location in the Cascade foothills, which situates it at a considerably higher elevation than other towns and cities in the Portland metropolitan area. The first frost in Boring typically occurs within the first week of November, while the last is typically in the first week of April.

==== Annual data ====
Climate data for Boring, Oregon
Month	Jan	Feb	Mar	Apr	May	Jun	Jul	Aug	Sep	Oct	Nov	Dec	Year
Mean daily maximum °F (°C)	46 (8)	51 (11)	56 (13)	61 (16)	68 (20)	73 (23)	80 (27)	81 (27)	75 (24)	64 (18)	52 (11)	46 (8)	63 (17)
Mean daily minimum °F (°C)	34 (1)	36 (2)	38 (3)	41 (5)	46 (8)	50 (10)	54 (12)	54 (12)	50 (10)	44 (7)	39 (4)	35 (2)	44 (7)
Average precipitation inches (mm)	7.53 (191)	6.16 (156)	5.51 (140)	4.36 (111)	3.55 (90)	2.45 (62)	.97 (25)	1.26 (32)	1.26 (32)	2.36 (60)	7.76 (197)	8.04 (204)	54.26 (1,378)
Source: Zip Data Maps Profile for Zip Code 97009

== Economy ==
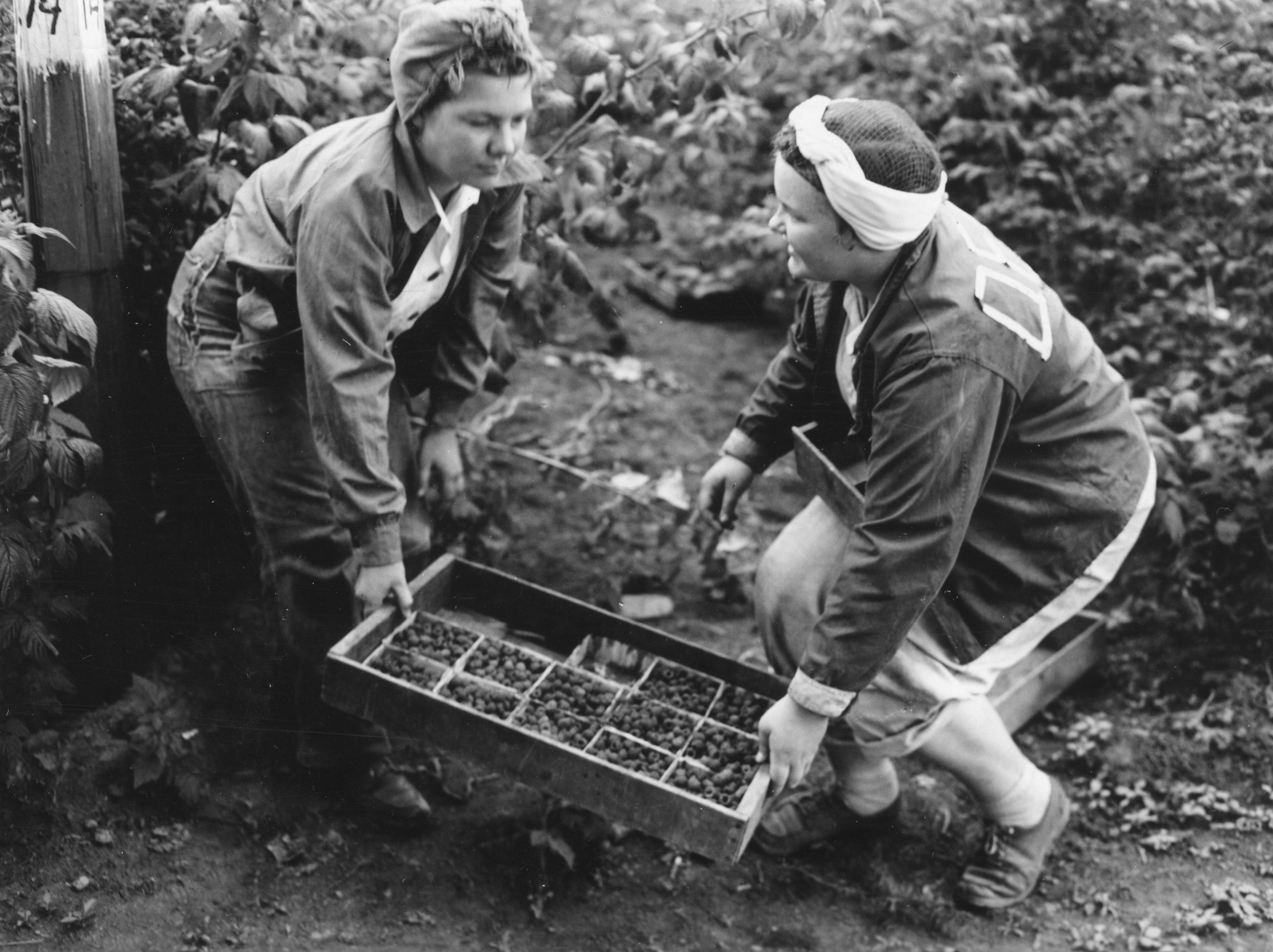
Two teenage girls picking berries on a farm in Boring, 1946

After its inception as a railroad community, Boring evolved into a hub for the timber industry in the Northwest, beginning in the pre-World War I era and continuing throughout much of the 20th century. One of the first mills established in Boring was the Hillyard Sawmill, which began operations in the 1890s; the mill produced over 30,000 feet (9,100 m) of lumber per day, mostly consisting of railroad ties. Bert Jonsrud, an early resident of the area, would later establish the Jonsrud Bros. Lumber Company, which would become Boring's main lumber mill. In a 1915 survey of timber and logging camps in the Pacific Northwest, it was reported that Jonsrud mill was producing 20,000 feet (6,100 m) of lumber per day. Today, Vanport International is the main lumber company operating out of Boring. Although their main business is lumber export, they are co-located with a lumber mill actively processing timber products.

The Portland Traction Company, a now-defunct railroad, operated a rail line from Portland (near the current location of the Oregon Museum of Science and Industry (OMSI) on the Willamette River) to Boring via Gresham. In the 1950s, the Southern Pacific and Union Pacific railroads jointly took over operation of the remaining portion of the line for freight operations. Much of the line has since been purchased by local governments for the creation of a long-distance rail trail named the Springwater Corridor.

The community is also home to a large number of dairy farms, plant nurseries and berry farms, including Iseli Nursery and Liepold Farms, who supplies produce to the local restaurant chain Burgerville. There are over thirty active plant and tree nurseries that operate within the community. Another Boring community staple, Mt. Hood Center, was built in Boring in 1974 and the facility is still functioning today as an equestrian center, event venue, and an equine-based schooling alternative, Mt. Hood Center Academy. Boring is also home of a campus of Guide Dogs For The Blind, Inc., the oldest guide dog training program on the US West Coast. The largest employer in Boring as of 2018 is Good Shepherd Community Church, an independent Evangelical church.

== Demographics ==
According to the 2020–2024 American Community Survey 5-year estimates, ZIP Code Tabulation Area (ZCTA) 97009 had a population of 8,336. Males made up 50.50% of the population, while females made up 49.50%. According to this data, the population's ethnic profile was 77.3% white, 13.3% Hispanic or Latino, 2.6% Asian, 3% African American, and 4% two or more races.

32.20% of households in the ZCTA earned under $50,000 annually, while 39.80% earned between $50,000–$100,000, and 28% had reported earnings exceeding $100,000. As of 2018, the unemployment rate was 3.98%. 86.8% of residents were property owners, while 13.2% were renters. In 2015, Boring was ranked among the wealthiest ZIP codes in the Portland metropolitan area.

== Law and government ==
Along with other unincorporated communities in Clackamas County, Boring is served by Metro, a regional government of the Portland metropolitan area, and the only metropolitan planning organization in the United States. The community is located within Oregon's 3rd congressional district, represented by Earl Blumenauer.

In 2015, Steve Bates, the former chair of the Boring planning council received over 700 signatures in favor of having the community removed from the Metro jurisdiction, due to the fact that Metro's regional boundary only includes the western half of the community, where Boring's downtown area lies. Metro responded by noting that Boring lies outside of their urban growth boundary, and that the jurisdictional boundary had no bearing on any foreseeable incorporation of Boring.

According to the Clackamas County voting data from the 2012 U.S. general election, Boring somewhat favored the Republican party, which accounted for 59% of votes, while 37% favored the Democratic party. Other parties accounted for 4% of votes. In the 2008 U.S. general election, the Republican party was only slightly favored at 51%, with the Democratic party at 47%, and 2% accounting for other parties.

== Education ==
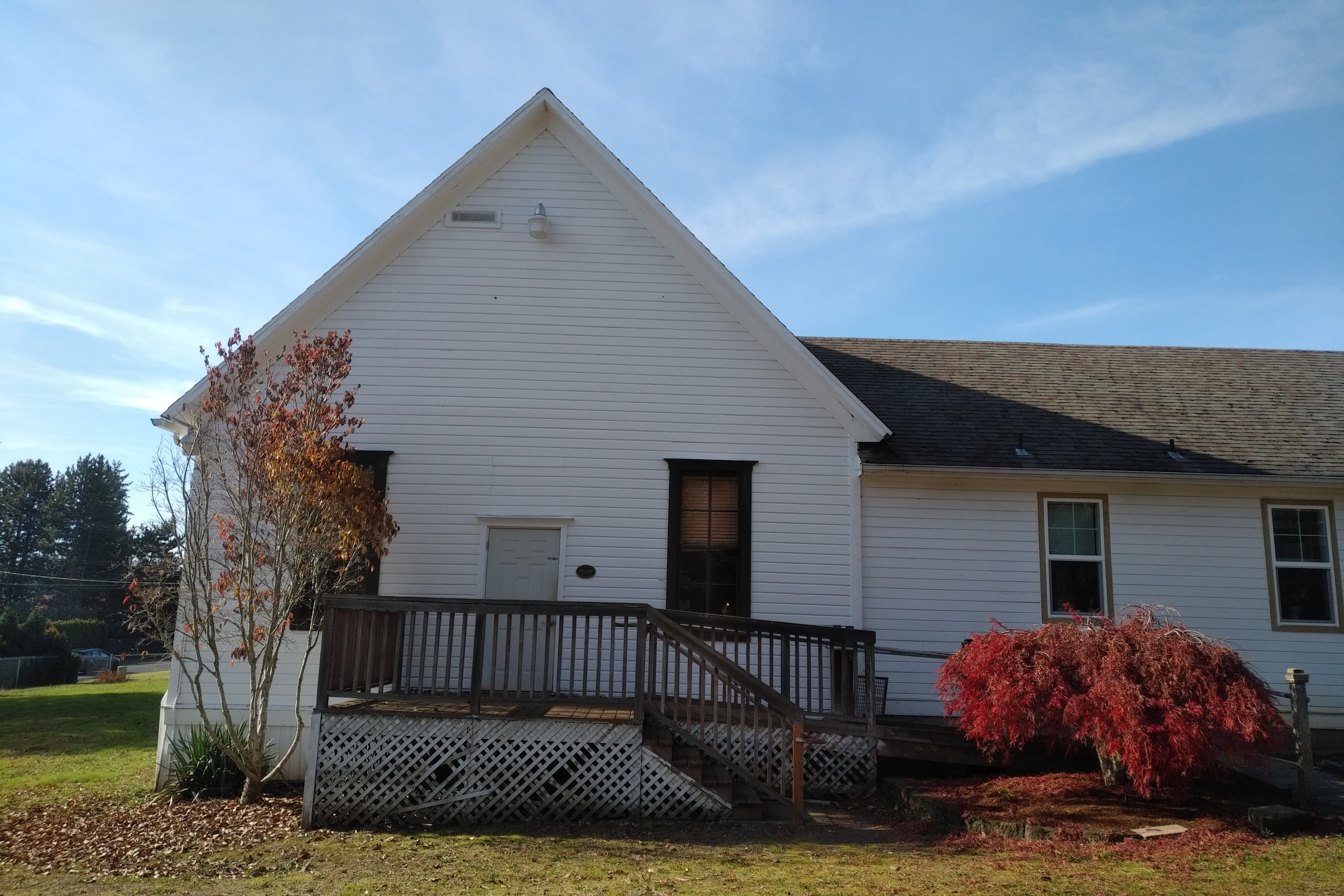
Former Kelso Schoolhouse, est. 1885

The first schoolhouse in Boring was the Fern Hill School, built in 1883. The Kelso Schoolhouse opened two years later, in 1885. Another four-room schoolhouse, Oregonia, was built in 1904. A 40-by-60-foot (12 by 18 m) play shed was added to the school in 1918.

Contemporarily, the community is served by the Oregon Trail and the Gresham-Barlow school districts as the community straddles the boundary between the two. Elementary schools in Boring include Naas Elementary and Kelso Elementary. Secondary schools serving Boring include Boring Middle School, Sandy High School (Oregon Trail), and Sam Barlow High School (Gresham-Barlow). Private schools in the area include Good Shepherd School and Hoodview Adventist School.

Boring is also home to Oregon Trail Academy, the only public K–12 single campus International Baccalaureate school in the Northwest. The school was established as a charter school in 2010 by the Oregon Trail School District and also serves students from Gresham-Barlow. In 2019, the school ranked in the top 15 schools in the Portland metro area and 17th in the state.

Students' test score performance in the public school system in Boring ranks at or above the national average in both elementary and middle school(s).

== Infrastructure ==
Oregon Route 212 begins in Boring, and runs through the center of the downtown area. Its roads are maintained by the Oregon Department of Transportation.

From the 1970s until the end of 2012, Boring was within the TriMet transit district, the Portland metropolitan area's mass transit system, and was served by bus line 84, albeit with only a single round trip in each peak period. In 2011, business owners in Boring petitioned the transit district's board to remove Boring from the district, arguing that Boring was receiving too little bus service relative to the amount being paid in employer-payroll taxes. The petition was approved, to take effect at the beginning of 2013, bringing an end to TriMet service in Boring.

The Springwater Corridor, a rail trail that was originally a railroad running between Boring and Portland, begins in Boring next to Boring Middle School, and is used for running, walking, and cycling. The trail ends at the Eastbank Esplanade in downtown Portland.

== In popular culture ==
The eponymous fictional town of the Disney TV series Gravity Falls, which also takes place in Oregon, is inspired by Boring.

In 2017, it was reported that ABC had developed a "serial killer comedy" series, Boring, OR, about a small town under siege by a serial murderer. The series is being produced by Jack Black.

In 2013, the community was home to an event hosted by Vitaminwater, in a series in which the company gave Boring and the town of Normal, Illinois, "makeovers". The event featured musical performances by Santigold, Matt & Kim, and Yung Skeeter, as well as standup comedy performances which included Amy Schumer. Boring was the subject of a 2016 promotional documentary short by Brooklyn, New York-based cinematographer Adam McDaid for Ogilvy & Mather.

In 2018, the Netflix web television series Everything Sucks! is set in the town and focuses on students attending the fictional "Boring High School."

== Notable people ==
- Bob Amsberry (1928–1957), original member of The Mickey Mouse Club
- William H. Boring (1841–1932), Union soldier; founder of town
- Ryan Crouser (1992–), shot putter, discus thrower, Olympic Gold Medalist
- Charis Michelsen (1974–), actress, model, and makeup artist
- Ben Musa (1905–1974), Oregon state legislator
- Maria Thayer (1975–), actress and comedian
- Brian Wilbur (1986–), American football quarterback

== Sister cities ==
Though not recognized by Sister Cities International, Boring is paired with the following municipalities:

- Dull, Perth & Kinross, Scotland
- Bland, New South Wales, Australia

== See also ==
- Boring Lava Field
- Plain, Washington
- Cazadero, Oregon
- Damascus, Oregon
- List of places with unusual names
  - Boring, Maryland

== Sources ==
- Bishop, Ellen Morris; Allen, John Eliot (2004). Hiking Oregon's Geology (2nd ed.). Mountaineer Books. ISBN 978-0-89886-847-0.
- Bosserman, Dan (2014). Boring. Images of America. Arcadia Publishing. ISBN 978-1-4671-3210-7.
- Gabriel, Jordi Vives, ed. (2014). Case Studies in Sustainability Management: The Oikos Collection. Vol. 3. Greenleaf Press. ISBN 978-1-78353-068-7 – via Google Books.
- McArthur, Lewis A. (2003) [First published 1928]. Oregon Geographic Names (7th ed.). Portland, Oregon: Oregon Historical Society Press. ISBN 0-87595-277-1.
- Morgan, Lane (1992). The Good Food Guide to Washington and Oregon: Discover the Finest, Freshest Foods Grown and Harvested in the Northwest. Sasquatch Books. ISBN 978-0-912365-50-3 – via Google Books.
- Parker, Quentin (2010). Welcome to Horneytown, North Carolina, Population: 15: An insider's guide to 201 of the world's weirdest and wildest places. Adams Media. ISBN 978-1-4405-0454-9 – via Google Books.
- Vertrees, J.D.; Gregory, Peter (2010). Japanese Maples: The Complete Guide to Selection and Cultivation (4th ed.). London; Portland: Timber Press. ISBN 978-0-88192-932-4.
