= Cottrell, Oregon =

Unincorporated community in the state of Oregon, United States

Cottrell
- Unincorporated community
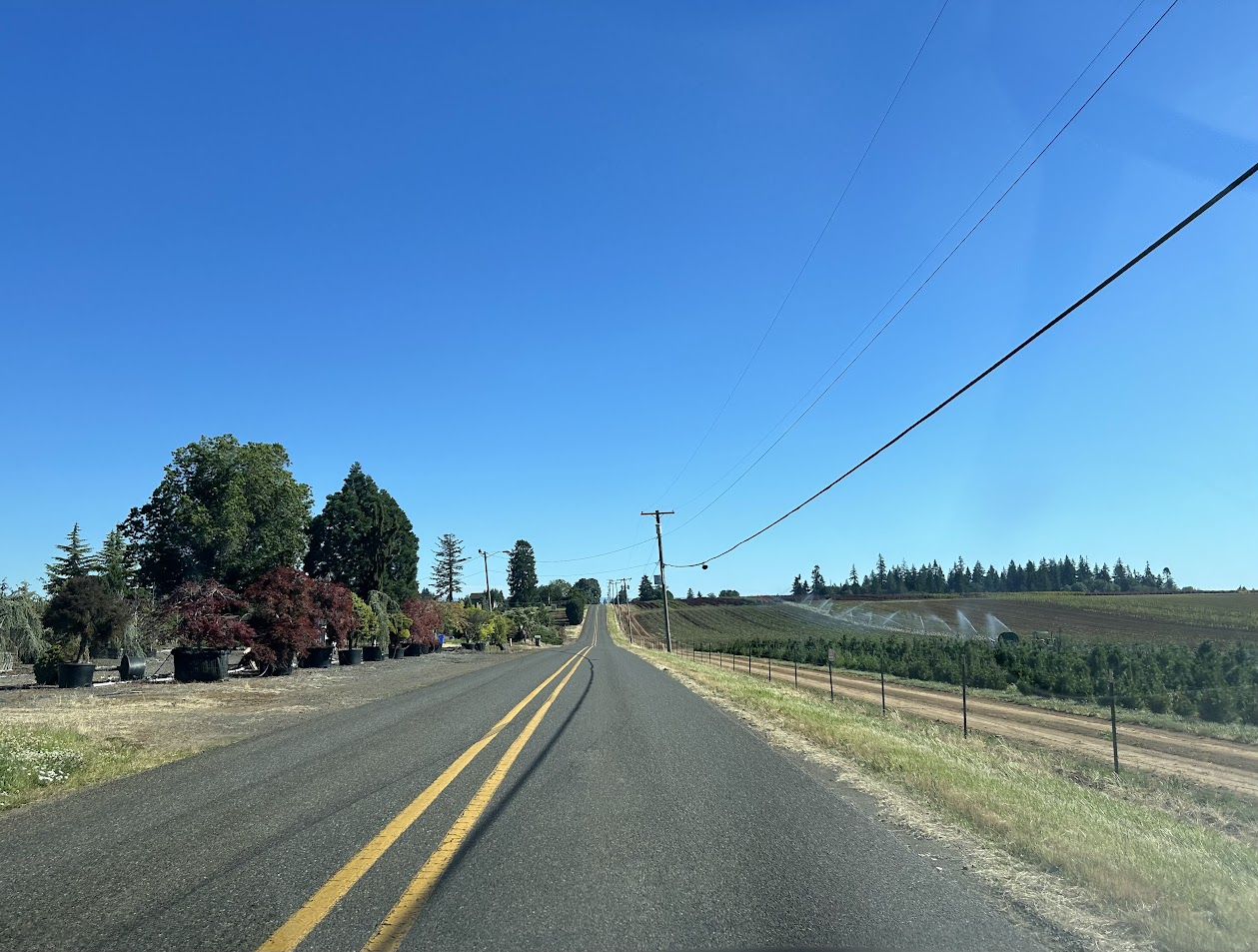
- SE 352nd Avenue in Cottrell

- Location within the state of Oregon Cottrell (the United States)
- Coordinates: 45°27′27″N 122°18′20″W
- Country: United States
- State: Oregon
- County: Clackamas
- Elevation: 659 ft (201 m)
- Time zone: UTC-8 (Pacific (PST))
  - Summer (DST): UTC-7 (PDT)
- GNIS feature ID: 1136180

Cottrell is an unincorporated crossroads community in north Clackamas County, Oregon, United States.

== History ==
Cottrell was founded by Georgia Andrews, whose maiden name was Cottrell, the wife of Charles Ida Andrews. The couple was wed in 1893). Georgia and her mother Carrie Arabella (Townsley) Cottrell moved to Oregon from Milwaukee, Wisconsin after Georgia's father and Carrie's husband George Cottrell, was killed in a railroad accident. Georgia typically went by and wrote her name as 'Georgie'. Her and her mother both died in Ashland in 1953 and 1943, respectively.

There was a Cottrell post office from 1894 until 1904; it is believed to have closed when Rural Free Delivery was extended to the area. There is also a Cottrell Road and a Cottrell school a mile east of the locale, and there was a Cottrell station on the defunct Mount Hood Electric Railway line about a mile to the north. The now-abandoned station was across the county line in Multnomah County.

== See also ==
- Johnson Creek (Willamette River)
