= Gresham Central Transit Center =

Transit center in Gresham, Oregon, U.S.

Gresham Central TC
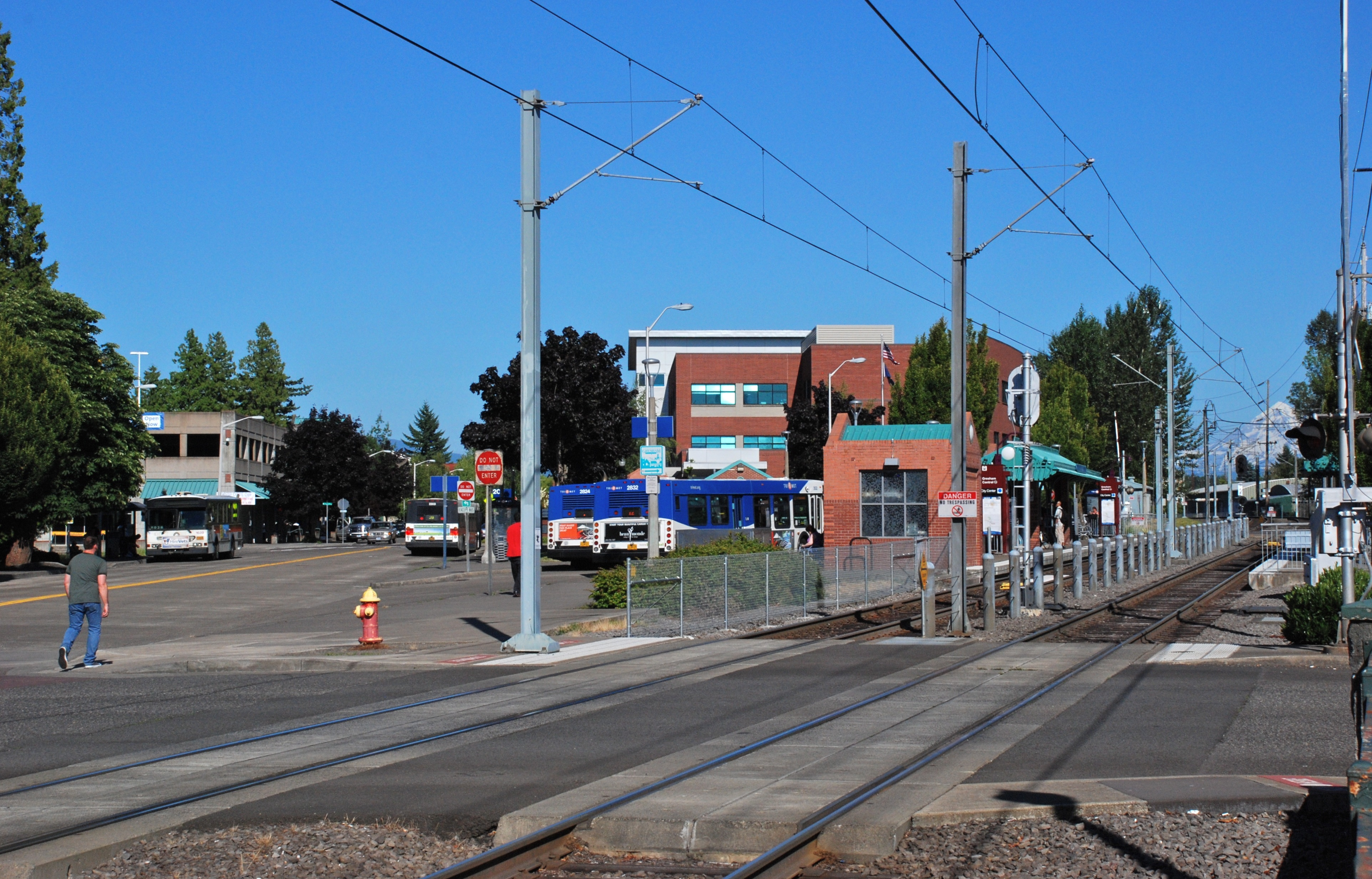
- Gresham Central Transit Center MAX platform as seen from across Hood Avenue

General information
- Location: 350 NE 8th Street; Gresham, Oregon; U.S.
- Coordinates: 45°30′10″N 122°25′38″W
- Owner: TriMet
- Line: Eastside MAX
- Platforms: 2 side platforms 6 bus bays
- Tracks: 2
- Bus routes: TriMet: FX2, 9, 20, 21, 81, 84; Sandy Area Metro
- Bus stands: 6

Construction
- Parking: 540 spaces
- Cycle facilities: Racks and lockers
- Accessible: Yes

History
- Opened: 1981/82 (bus); September 5, 1986 (MAX)

Services
Preceding station	TriMet	Following station
Gresham City Hall toward Hatfield Government Center	Blue Line	Cleveland Ave Terminus
Location

The Gresham Central Transit Center, also known as Gresham Transit Center, is a TriMet transit center and MAX light rail station in Gresham, Oregon, United States. The center is a connection point for several bus routes and the MAX Blue Line. The light rail station is the 25th stop eastbound on the eastside MAX line, which was the Portland metropolitan area's first light rail line.

The transit center is located at the intersection of NE Kelly Avenue and NE 8th Street in the central part of Gresham. It is a hub for bus service to points in eastern Multnomah County and Portland.

== History and description ==
It originally opened as a bus-only transit center in 1981, named Gresham Transit Center, in the form of multiple bus stops clustered along 8th Street and Kelly Avenue, a temporary arrangement until construction of a planned off-street facility. The off-street bus layover area – a short section of bus-only road with purpose-built bus stops – was opened in February 1982.

The adjacent MAX station opened in 1986, and the entire facility was renamed Gresham Central Transit Center at that time. However, TriMet continues to refer to it as Gresham Transit Center (or Gresham TC) on bus destination signs and bus schedules. The station originally had no park-and-ride lot, but TriMet built and opened a three-level garage with a ground-floor retail space in 1996. A 30-space bike-and-ride facility (a secured parking area for bicycles) was built later, inside the garage, and opened in July 2011.

Public art at the transit station includes Living Room, a sculpture comprising vintage furniture cast in concrete and a faux television set cast in bronze, which was installed in 2001 through a public art program. The work was subsequently removed in October 2013.

The transit center was located in TriMet fare zone 4 from 1982 until September 1988, and in zone 3 from then until September 2012, at which time TriMet discontinued all use of zones in its fare structure.

== Bus service ==
As of August 23, 2026, this station is served by the following bus lines:

- FX2–Division
- 9-Powell Blvd
- 20–Burnside/Stark
- 21–Sandy Blvd/223rd
- 81–Kane/257th Ave
- 84–Powell Valley/Orient Dr
- Sandy Area Metro service to Sandy, Oregon

Discontinued 12/1/24

- 80 - Kane/Troutdale Rd

Discontinued 8/23/26

- 82–South Gresham

== Gallery ==
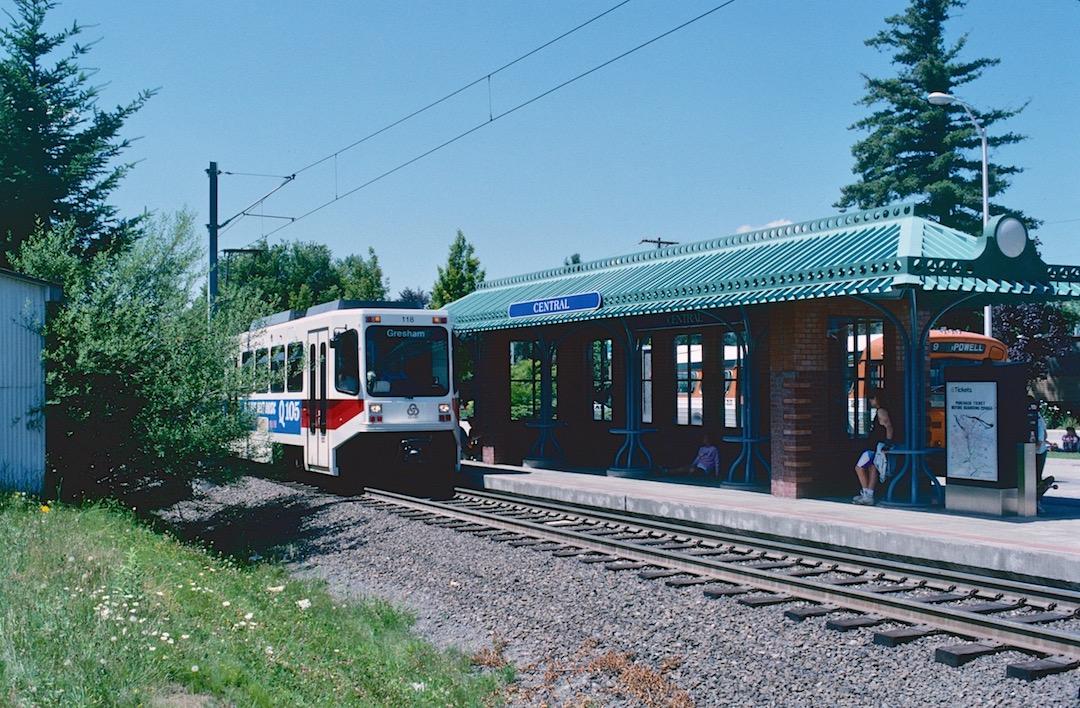
A 1989 photo, when the line section on which the station is located was still bidirectional single-track

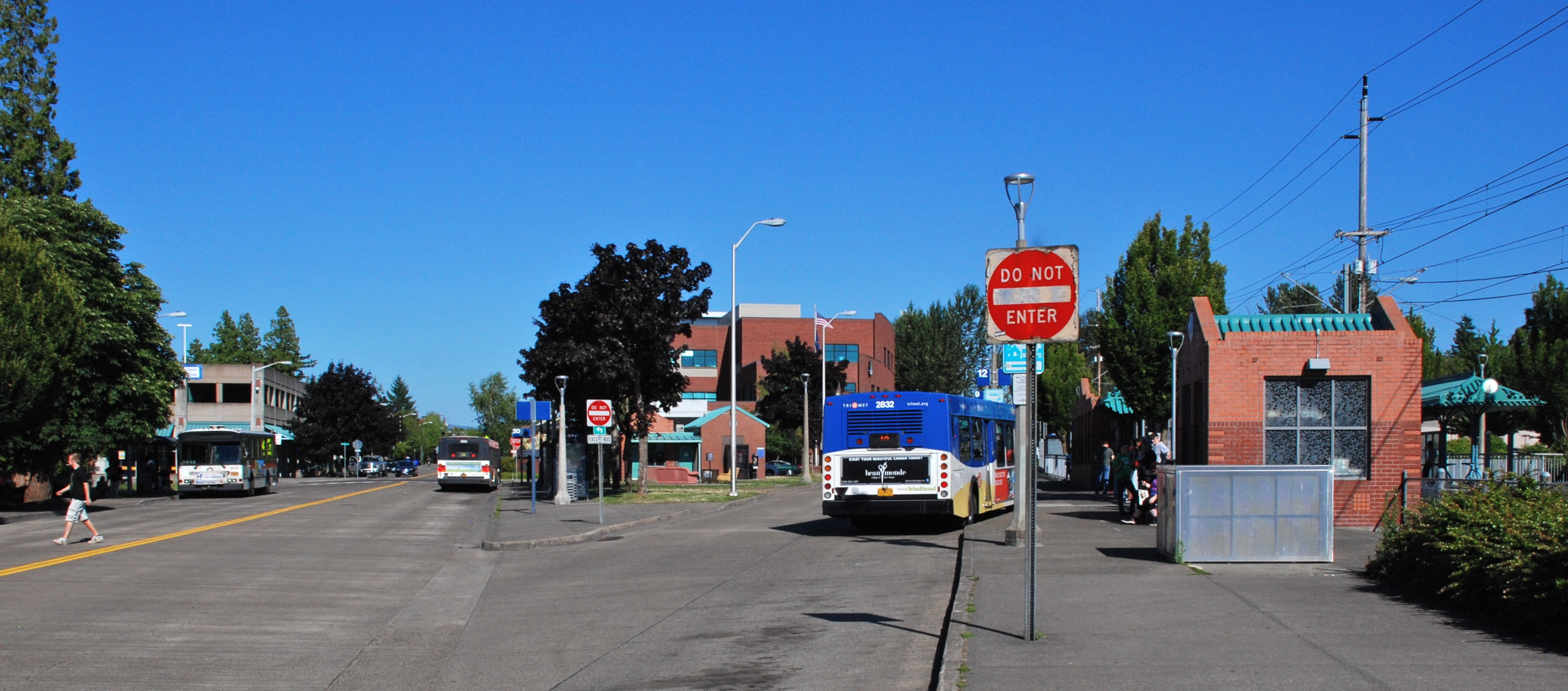
The transit center's bus area, with the 1982-opened bus-only roadway in the center

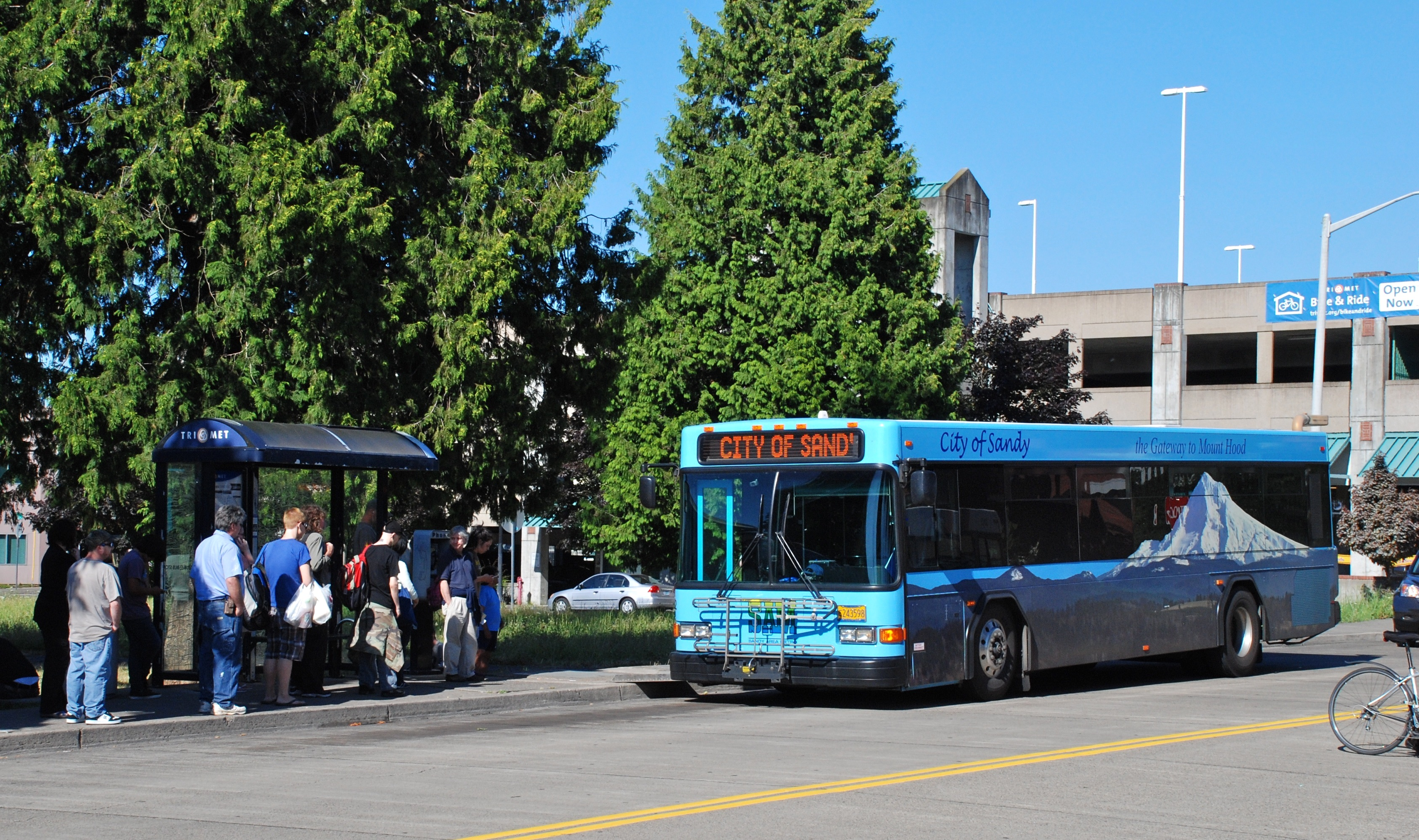
A Sandy Area Metro bus at the transit center

== See also ==
- List of TriMet transit centers
