= Vanport International =

Vanport International, Inc. is a Boring, Oregon based logging company that exports lumber from the United States to foreign countries. Started in 1967, the company originally exported timber to Japan before expanding markets to China, Taiwan, and Russia. The company name was changed from Vanport Manufacturing to Vanport International in 1994. Vanport took over operations of the sawmill on the Warm Springs Indian Reservation in 2008. As of 2012 the company had 208 employees.
