= William H. Boring =

American soldier

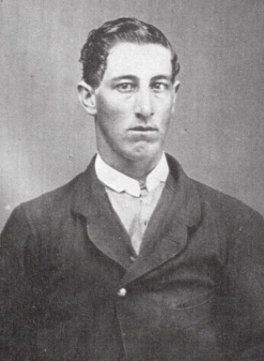
- Born: William Harrison Boring; February 26, 1841; Greenfield, Illinois, U.S.
- Died: December 1, 1932 (aged 91); Portland, Oregon, U.S.
- Burial place: Damascus Pioneer Cemetery, Damascus, Oregon, U.S.45.417621°N 122.458978°W
- Spouse: Sarah Elizabeth Wilder (m. 1867; died 1922)
- Children: 2
- Military career
- Allegiance: United States
- Branch: United States Army; Union Army
- Service years: 1861–1863
- Rank: Private
- Unit: 33rd Regiment, Illinois Infantry
- Conflicts: Siege of Vicksburg

William Harrison Boring (February 26, 1841 – December 1, 1932) was an American Union soldier who fought in the American Civil War, and who was a member of the distinguished battalion in the 33rd Illinois Infantry Regiment that helped lead the capture of Vicksburg in 1863. Boring later came to be known as a pioneer after settling Boring, Oregon in 1874, which took its name from him.

== Biography ==
=== Early life ===
Boring was born in Greenfield, Illinois on February 26, 1841. His mother was originally from Tennessee, and his father was from Maryland. He had one elder brother, George Boring (1838–1916), who was also a pioneer and settler of the town of Clarence, Missouri. Boring enlisted as a Union soldier during the American Civil War with the 33rd Illinois Volunteer Infantry Regiment, beginning in 1861 under Bvt. Major General Charles Edward Hovey and Colonel Charles E. Lippincott.

He was a member of the battalion that distinguished itself in the capture of Vicksburg in 1863, during which 11 of its 32 members died in battle. Boring sustained near-life-threatening injuries to his face and throat in the Siege of Vicksburg, which led to his discharge. The severity of the scars he received from his battle injuries led him to wear a beard for the remainder of his life.

After his discharge, Boring returned to Greenfield, where he worked on his mother's farm. On December 11, 1867, Boring married Sarah Elizabeth Wilder in Greene County, Illinois.

=== Settlement of Boring, Oregon ===
In the early 1870s, president Ulysses S. Grant began offering incentives to homesteaders in the Western United States, which attracted William Boring; he and his wife Sarah left Illinois for San Francisco, California, and then traveled north to Portland, Oregon. William's elder half-brother, Joseph (b. 1829), who had traveled across the Oregon Trail in 1853, had already settled there and been living in the area for nearly two decades. William and Sarah joined Joseph at his home in 1874, twelve miles east of Portland. There, William and Sarah settled on 160 acres (65 ha) of land. They had two children: Elsie in October 1875, who only lived for nine days; and Orville, born in 1879.

The settlement occupied by the Boring family came to be known as Boring, Oregon after William donated land for a schoolhouse to be built in 1883, By the turn of the twentieth century, the town had become a thriving logging community, and the construction of an interurban railroad to the town by the Portland Railway, Light and Power Company brought further residents and business.

=== Later life and death ===
According to the 1910 U.S. census, William (then aged 69) and Sarah (then aged 65) shared their home with son Orville, his wife, Lucy, and the couple's three-year-old son, Lester. Also living in the home was Thomas Field, a hired handyman from Minnesota, and Robert Bishop, a boarder from Maine. Boring was widowed after Sarah's death on February 12, 1922. He relocated to Portland sometime between 1923 and 1930, moving into the home of close friends Lester and Emma Armstrong. Boring died in Portland in 1931 at age 91, after an undisclosed eight-month illness.

== See also ==
- Boring, Oregon
- 33rd Illinois Volunteer Infantry Regiment
- Siege of Vicksburg
