= Country Squire Airpark =

- IATA: none; ICAO: - FAA: S48

Summary
- Airport type: Public
- Operator: Private owner
- Location: Sandy, Oregon
- Elevation AMSL: 1,175 ft / 358 m
- Coordinates: 45°21′16.0000″N 122°16′05.00″W
- Interactive map of Country Squire Airpark

Runways
Direction	Length		Surface
Direction	ft	m	Surface
7/25	3,095	943	Asphalt

Country Squire Airpark (FAA LID: S48) is a public airport located three miles (4.8 km) south of Sandy in Clackamas County, Oregon, United States.
