= Oatfield, Oregon =

Unincorporated community in the state of Oregon, United States

- Census-designated place (CDP)
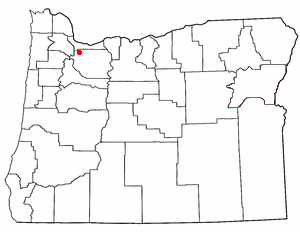
- Location of Oatfield, Oregon
- Coordinates: 45°24′45″N 122°35′49″W
- Country: United States
- State: Oregon
- County: Clackamas

Area
  - Total: 3.39 sq mi (8.79 km^{2})
  - Land: 3.39 sq mi (8.79 km^{2})
  - Water: 0 sq mi (0.00 km^{2})
- Elevation: 112 ft (34 m)

Population (2020)
  - Total: 13,977
  - Density: 4,117.0/sq mi (1,589.57/km^{2})
- Time zone: UTC-8 (Pacific (PST))
  - Summer (DST): UTC-7 (PDT)
- ZIP code: 97267
- Area codes: 503 and 971
- FIPS code: 41-54325
- GNIS feature ID: 2408970

Oatfield is an unincorporated community and census-designated place in Clackamas County, Oregon, United States. It is in the Portland metropolitan area. As of the 2020 census, Oatfield had a population of 13,977.

It is named after Oatfield Road, which runs between Milwaukie and Gladstone. Oatfield Road was named for the Oatfield family, well-known pioneers of the area.

== Geography ==
Oatfield is located in northwestern Clackamas County and is bordered by the city of Milwaukie to the northwest, unincorporated Oak Grove to the west, unincorporated Jennings Lodge to the southwest, and the city of Gladstone to the south. Interstate 205 forms the eastern edge of the community, separating Oatfield from unincorporated Clackamas. Oatfield also completely surrounds the small city of Johnson City.

According to the United States Census Bureau, the Oatfield CDP has a total area of 3.4 square miles (8.8 km^{2}), all land.

== Demographics ==
Historical population
Census	Pop.	Note	%±
2020	13,977		—
U.S. Decennial Census

=== 2020 census ===
As of the 2020 census, Oatfield had a population of 13,977. The median age was 47.3 years. 18.0% of residents were under the age of 18 and 26.0% of residents were 65 years of age or older. For every 100 females there were 91.8 males, and for every 100 females age 18 and over there were 89.5 males age 18 and over.

100.0% of residents lived in urban areas, while 0.0% lived in rural areas.

There were 5,294 households in Oatfield, of which 26.2% had children under the age of 18 living in them. Of all households, 56.6% were married-couple households, 12.4% were households with a male householder and no spouse or partner present, and 23.9% were households with a female householder and no spouse or partner present. About 20.8% of all households were made up of individuals and 12.6% had someone living alone who was 65 years of age or older.

There were 5,557 housing units, of which 4.7% were vacant. The homeowner vacancy rate was 0.8% and the rental vacancy rate was 14.4%.

Racial composition as of the 2020 census
Race	Number	Percent
White	11,412	81.6%
Black or African American	203	1.5%
American Indian and Alaska Native	140	1.0%
Asian	530	3.8%
Native Hawaiian and Other Pacific Islander	29	0.2%
Some other race	402	2.9%
Two or more races	1,261	9.0%
Hispanic or Latino (of any race)	1,072	7.7%

=== 2000 census ===
As of the census of 2000, there were 15,750 people, 5,903 households, and 4,563 families residing in the CDP. The population density was 3,608.1 inhabitants per square mile (1,393.1/km^{2}). There were 6,110 housing units at an average density of 1,399.7 per square mile (540.4/km^{2}). The racial makeup of the CDP was 93.43% White, 0.47% African American, 0.53% Native American, 1.99% Asian, 0.12% Pacific Islander, 0.93% from other races, and 2.52% from two or more races. Hispanic or Latino of any race were 2.64% of the population.

There were 5,903 households, out of which 30.6% had children under the age of 18 living with them, 65.9% were married couples living together, 8.5% had a female householder with no husband present, and 22.7% were non-families. 17.8% of all households were made up of individuals, and 7.1% had someone living alone who was 65 years of age or older. The average household size was 2.65 and the average family size was 2.99.

In the CDP, the population was spread out, with 23.2% under the age of 18, 7.0% from 18 to 24, 24.7% from 25 to 44, 30.8% from 45 to 64, and 14.4% who were 65 years of age or older. The median age was 42 years. For every 100 females, there were 95.2 males. For every 100 females age 18 and over, there were 92.3 males.

The median income for a household in the CDP was $59,769, and the median income for a family was $66,469. Males had a median income of $46,351 versus $33,247 for females. The per capita income for the CDP was $25,148. About 2.9% of families and 4.2% of the population were below the poverty line, including 4.5% of those under age 18 and 4.0% of those age 65 or over.
