= Redland, Oregon =

Unincorporated community in the state of Oregon, United States

Redland
- Unincorporated community
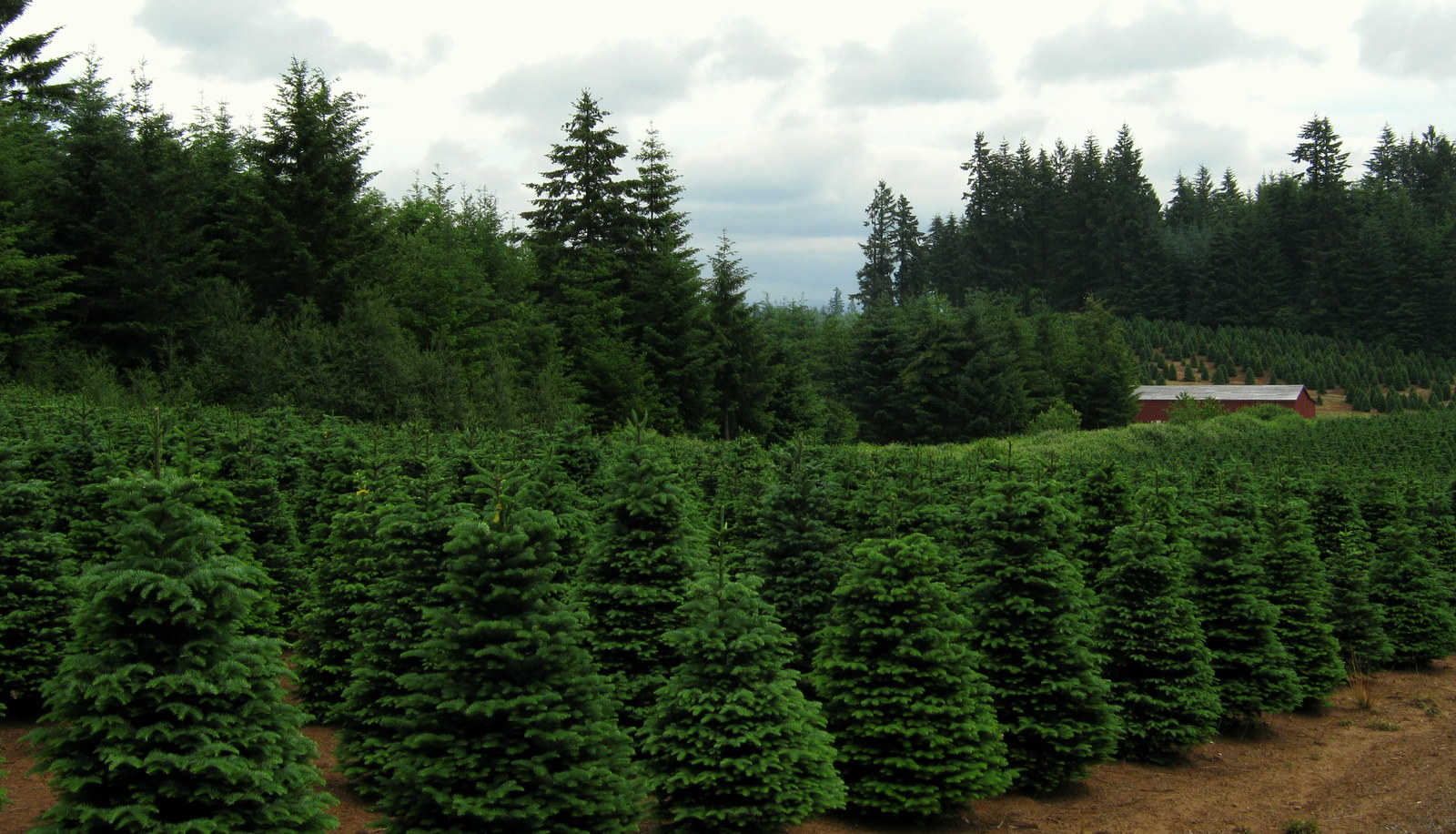
- Christmas tree farm near Redland

- Location within the state of Oregon Redland (the United States)
- Coordinates: 45°20′36″N 122°29′34″W
- Country: United States
- State: Oregon
- County: Clackamas
- Elevation: 348 ft (106 m)
- Time zone: UTC-8 (Pacific (PST))
  - Summer (DST): UTC-7 (PDT)
- ZIP code: 97045
- Area codes: 503 and 971
- GNIS feature ID: 1125911

Redland is an unincorporated community located in Clackamas County, Oregon, United States. It is located six miles (9.7 km) east of Oregon City and four miles (6.4 km) south of Carver.

The community was named for the color of the soil there.

Redland post office was established in 1892 and closed in 1903.
