= Molalla =

Molalla or Molala may refer to one of these Oregon-related articles:

- Molala people, a Native American tribe who traditionally lived near the Molalla River
  - Molala language, the language spoken by the Molala people
- Molalla River, a river in Clackamas County
- Molalla, Oregon, a city named after the river
  - Molalla Buckeroo, an annual rodeo held in Molalla
- Molalla Prairie, Oregon, an unincorporated area, designated as a hamlet, south of the city of Molalla
