= Macksburg, Oregon =

Unincorporated community in the state of Oregon, United States

- Unincorporated community
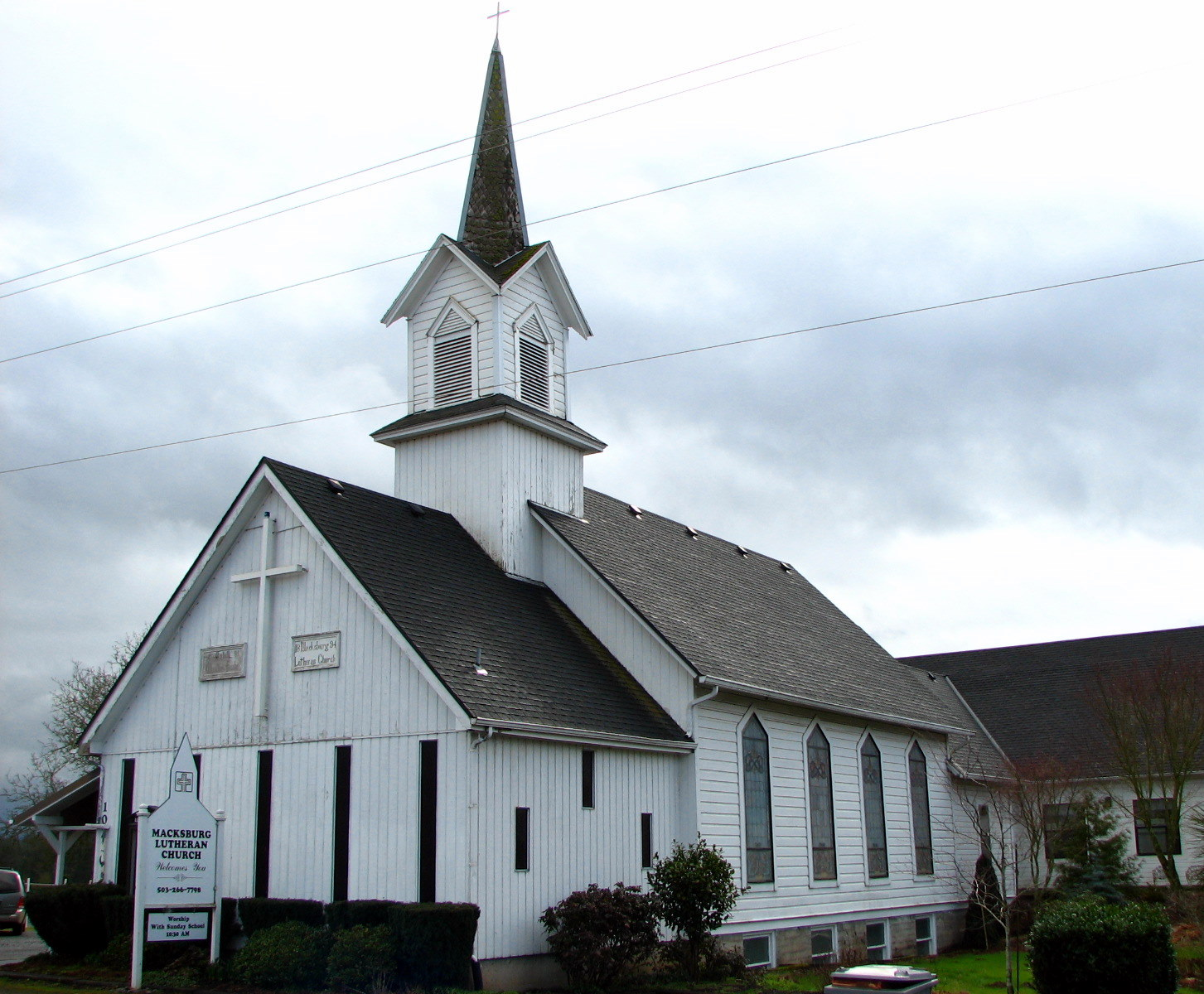
- Macksburg Lutheran Church

- Location within the state of Oregon Macksburg, Oregon (the United States)
- Coordinates: 45°12′49″N 122°39′40″W
- Country: United States
- State: Oregon
- County: Clackamas
- Elevation: 230 ft (70 m)
- Time zone: UTC-8 (Pacific (PST))
  - Summer (DST): UTC-7 (PDT)
- ZIP code: 97013
- Area codes: 503 and 971
- GNIS feature ID: 1123664

Macksburg is an unincorporated community in Clackamas County, Oregon, United States four miles southeast of Canby. It is located on Gribble Prairie between the Pudding River and the Molalla River.

Originally named "Macksburgh", Macksburg had a post office from 1884 to 1903. The town was named after William and Louisa Mack, pioneers of 1852.

In 1915, the community had a population of 200, a public school, two Lutheran churches, a grange hall and several stores. As of 1992, one church remained and the school, grange hall and stores were closed.

Macksburg Lutheran Church was built in 1892 and was listed on the National Register of Historic Places in 1982. Early members of the church were originally from Germany and Austria, so all services were conducted in German until 1929, and alternated between English and German until 1943.
