= Paul Gehrman =

American baseball player (1912–1986)

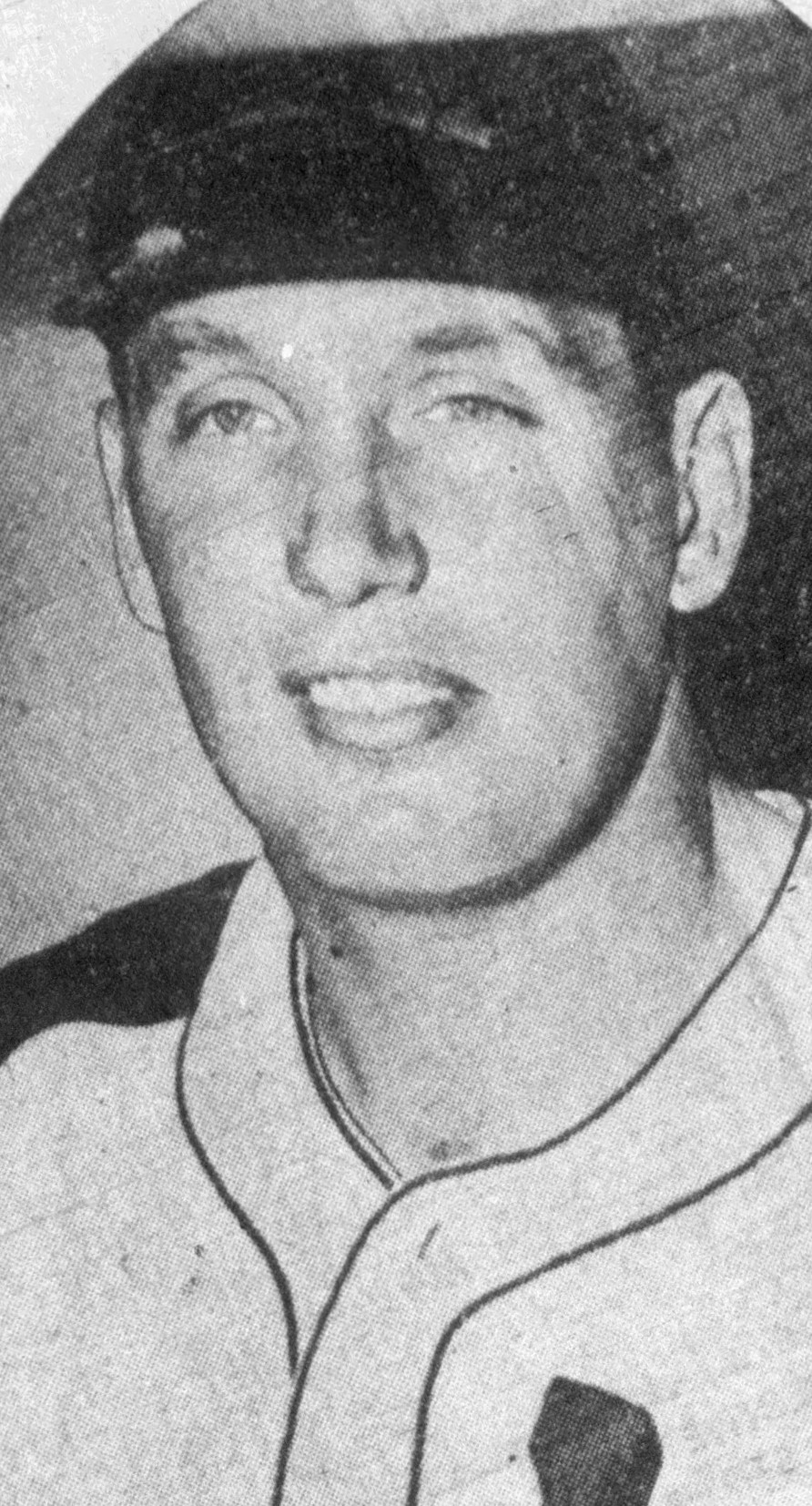
- Gehrman, circa 1943
- Pitcher
- Born: May 3, 1912; Marquam, Oregon
- Died: October 23, 1986 (aged 74); Bend, Oregon
- Batted: Right Threw: Right

MLB debut
- September 15, 1937, for the Cincinnati Reds

Last MLB appearance
- September 16, 1937, for the Cincinnati Reds

MLB statistics
- Win–loss record: 0–1
- Earned run average: 2.89
- Strikeouts: 1
- Stats at Baseball Reference

Teams
- Cincinnati Reds (1937)

Paul Arthur "Dutch" Gehrman (May 3, 1912 – October 23, 1986) was an American professional baseball player. He was a right-handed pitcher for one season (1937) with the Cincinnati Reds. For his career, he compiled an 0–1 record, with a 2.89 earned run average, and 1 strikeout in 9 1/3 innings pitched. His only decision occurred on September 15, in a 5–8 loss to the Brooklyn Dodgers at Crosley Field.

Gehrman was born in Marquam, Oregon, and died in Bend, Oregon, at the age of 74.
