= Yoder, Oregon =

Unincorporated community in the state of Oregon, United States

- Unincorporated community
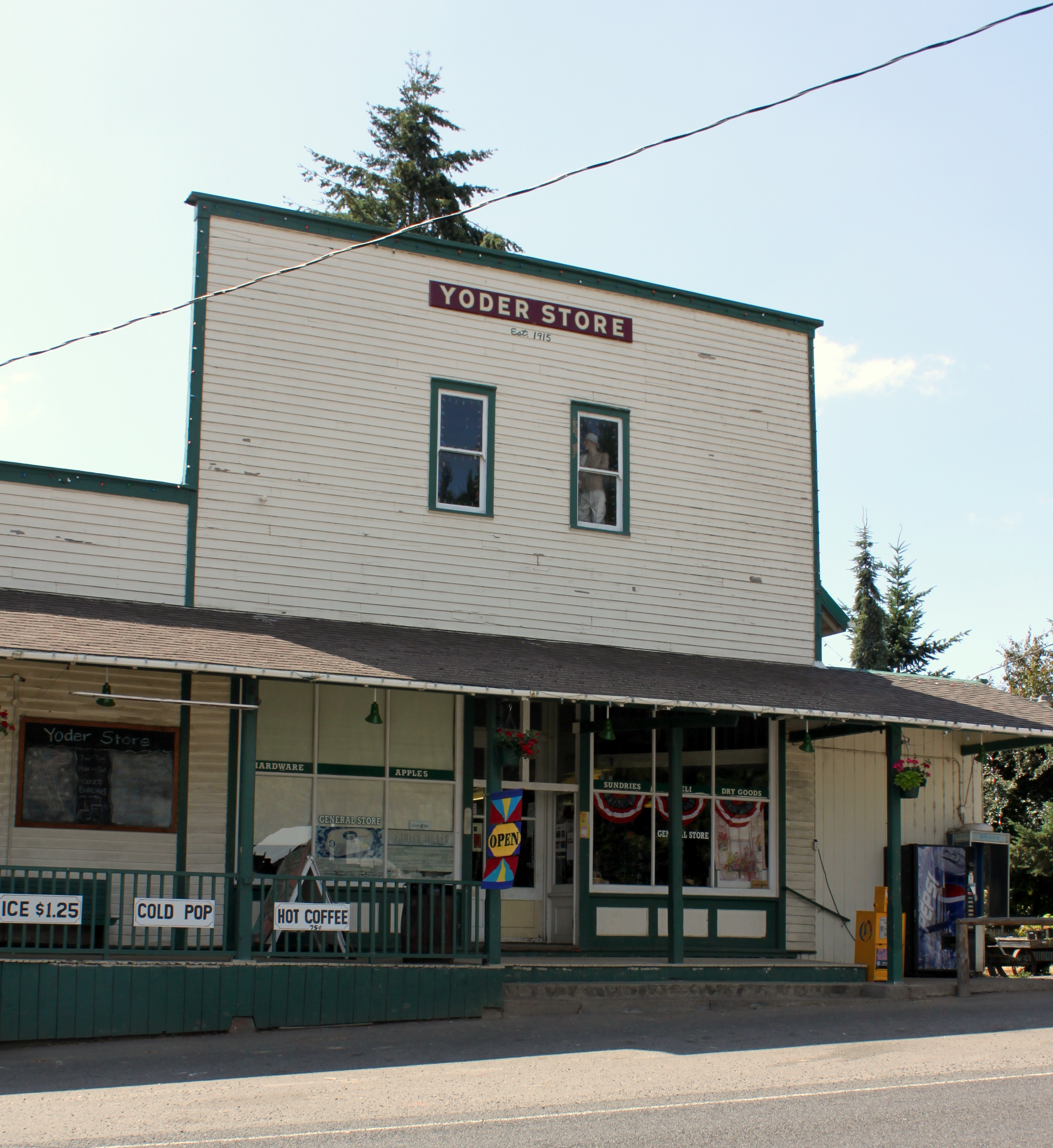
- Yoder Store

- Location within the state of Oregon Yoder, Oregon (the United States)
- Coordinates: 45°08′17″N 122°40′54″W
- Country: United States
- State: Oregon
- County: Clackamas
- Elevation: 240 ft (73 m)
- Time zone: UTC-8 (Pacific (PST))
  - Summer (DST): UTC-7 (PDT)
- GNIS feature ID: 1136931

Yoder is an unincorporated community in Clackamas County, Oregon, United States. The name "Yoder" comes from the Mennonites who settled in the area. The community is best known as a filming location for Nowhere Man.

Yoder is located on South Kropf Road, just north of South Schneider Road and about one mile south of Highway 211, where Kropf Road and 211 form Hamrick's Corner. Canby is to the north and Marquam is to the south.

The Yoder Mill, a sawmill built in 1889, has been burned down and rebuilt a total of three times. The Yoder Store, an old-style general store, was built in 1914.

The Yoder School was a small, wooden school that was built in 1923 and used until 1963. The building still stands. South Clackamas Community Church has met at the old Yoder School since the mid-1990s and even ran a private Christian School at the location for a few years.

The former Willamette Valley Southern Railway ran through Yoder, linking Oregon City and Mt. Angel.
