= Jean, Oregon =

Unincorporated community in the state of Oregon, United States

- Unincorporated community
- Location within Oregon Location within the United States
- Coordinates: 45°23′53″N 122°44′23″W
- Country: United States
- State: Oregon
- County: Clackamas
- Elevation: 171 ft (52 m)
- Time zone: UTC-8 (Pacific (PST))
  - Summer (DST): UTC-7 (PDT)
- ZIP code: 97035
- Area codes: 503 and 971
- GNIS feature ID: 1122389

Jean is an unincorporated community in Clackamas County, Oregon, United States.
