= Macksburg =

Macksburg can refer to a place in the United States:

- Macksburg, Iowa, in Madison County
- Macksburg, Ohio, in Washington County
- Macksburg, Oregon, in Clackamas County
