= Oregon City Service Learning Academy =

Location
- 404 7th St; Oregon City, Oregon, Clackamas County, Oregon 97045; United States
- Coordinates: 45.35231°N 122.59738°W

Information
- Type: Public
- Opened: 2006
- School district: Oregon City School District
- Principal: Sara Craig
- Grades: 9-12
- Enrollment: 170
- Mascot: Phoenix
- Website: OCSLA website

Oregon City Service Learning Academy is a public high school focused on service learning in Oregon City, Oregon, United States. It is currently located at the historic Eastham School at the intersection of 7th St and Mollala Ave.

== Academics ==
In 2008, 58% of the school's seniors received their high school diploma. Of 19 students, 11 graduated, 5 dropped out, and 3 are still in high school.
