= Carver, Oregon =

Unincorporated community in the state of Oregon, United States

Carver
- Unincorporated community
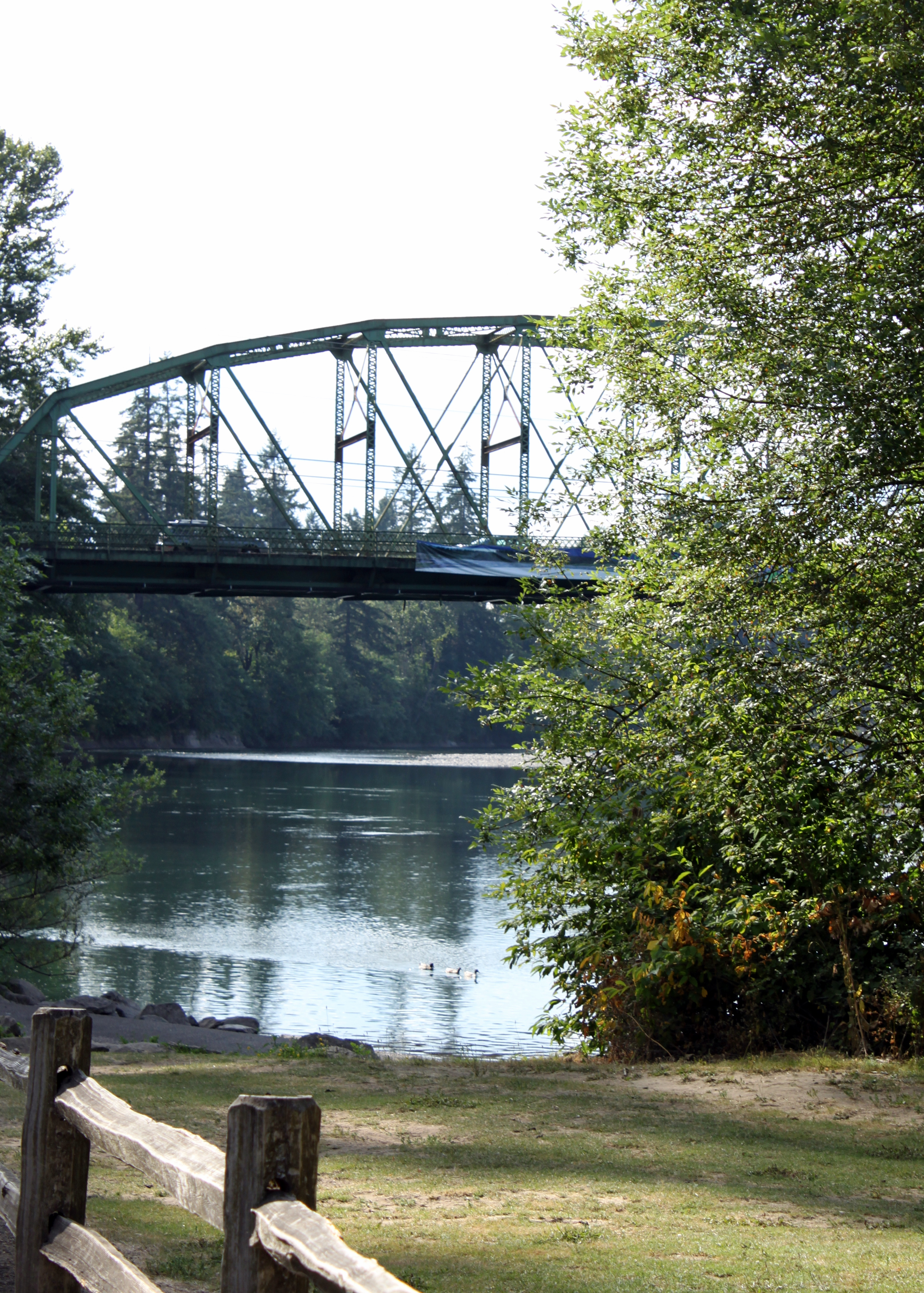
- Carver Bridge (replaced in 2019), Carver Park, and Clackamas River

- Location within the state of Oregon Carver (the United States)
- Coordinates: 45°23′40″N 122°29′50″W
- Country: United States
- State: Oregon
- County: Clackamas
- Elevation: 138 ft (42 m)
- Time zone: UTC-8 (Pacific (PST))
  - Summer (DST): UTC-7 (PDT)
- ZIP code: 97089
- Area codes: 503 and 971
- GNIS feature ID: 1136126

Carver is an unincorporated community in Clackamas County, Oregon, United States, which, between 2004 and 2016, was part of the city of Damascus, Oregon. Before 2004, when the city of Damascus incorporated, Carver was an independent, unincorporated community. The city of Damascus disincorporated in 2016, returning Carver to its previous status.

The center of Carver is located along the Clackamas River, three miles (4.8 km) southwest of the center of Damascus, and five miles (8 km) east of Clackamas. The community is located along Oregon Route 224.

== Points of interest ==
- Carver Bridge: The Clackamas River at Carver was originally crossed using a slack-line ferry operated by Horace Baker. Subsequently, a wooden covered bridge spanned the river and may have been the longest covered bridge in the state. A modern steel truss bridge replaced the wooden bridge in 1955 and was itself replaced in 2019. It carries an average of 7,200 vehicles per day. Located alongside the wooden bridge was a large train trestle of the Clackamas & Eastern Railway which connected past Viola and served several sawmills and communities.
- Horace Baker Log Cabin: Located on the south side of the Clackamas River, across from Carver, and managed by the Baker Cabin Historic Society, the original log cabin is restored and the site is maintained for historic interest. Horace Baker and Jane Hattan settled on the site after coming overland via the Oregon Trail and Barlow Road in 1846. Also on the historic site is the restored German Methodist Church, moved to this site in 1967 from Logan (roughly 6 miles or 9.7 kilometers east). The Pioneer Church, as it is now known, is used as a community meeting place and is rented for weddings and memorial events.
- Several scenes from the 2008 movie Twilight were filmed in Carver: the meadow scene was filmed in Carver Park, police chief Swan met with Bella for breakfast at the Carver Cafe, and the Stone Cliff Inn is the location where Edward revealed he was a vampire.
