= Needy, Oregon =

Unincorporated community in Oregon, United States

- Unincorporated community
- Location within Oregon Location within the United States
- Coordinates: 45°10′21″N 122°42′09″W
- Country: United States
- State: Oregon
- County: Clackamas
- Elevation: 174 ft (53 m)
- Time zone: UTC-8 (Pacific (PST))
  - Summer (DST): UTC-7 (PDT)
- ZIP code: 97013
- Area codes: 503 and 971
- GNIS feature ID: 1124627

Needy, also known as Hardscrabble, is an unincorporated community in Clackamas County, Oregon, United States. James H. Brents gave the community its names, which may be such because of its poverty. Needy's post office was established on February 16, 1885 and John M. Bacon was its postmaster. It closed on September 19, 1903. It is now served by the Canby post office.
