= Lakewood, Oregon =

Unincorporated community in the state of Oregon, United States

- Unincorporated community
- Location within Oregon Location within the United States
- Coordinates: 45°24′46″N 122°39′58″W
- Country: United States
- State: Oregon
- County: Clackamas
- Elevation: 154 ft (47 m)
- Time zone: UTC-8 (Pacific (PST))
  - Summer (DST): UTC-7 (PDT)
- ZIP code: 97034
- Area codes: 503 and 971
- GNIS feature ID: 1135950

Lakewood is an unincorporated community and neighborhood in the city of lake Oswego. Located in Clackamas County, Oregon, United States.

== History ==
In 1928 Lakewood bay was created after the marsh, named the “Duck Pond” by locals, was flooded by the Ladd Estate Company; Increasing the number of available shoreline properties.

A city ordinance was proposed to fine anyone who might refer to Lakewood Bay by its former name.
