= Molalla River School District =

School district in Oregon, United States

Address
- 412 Swiegle Avenue Molalla, Oregon, 97038; United States

District information
- Type: Public
- Grades: PreK–12
- NCES District ID: 4108310

Students and staff
- Students: 2,572
- Teachers: 150.67 (FTE)
- Staff: 120.13 (FTE)
- Student–teacher ratio: 16.99

Other information
- Website: www.molallariv.k12.or.us

Molalla River School District is a public school district serving Molalla, Oregon, United States, and the surrounding area of Clackamas County, including the communities of Clarkes, Mulino and Rural Dell. It is named after the Molalla River and Molala People.

== Demographics ==
In the 2009 school year, the district had 61 students classified as homeless by the Department of Education, or 2.1% of students in the district.

== Schools ==
=== High schools ===
- Molalla High School

=== Middle schools ===
- Molalla River Middle School

=== Elementary schools ===
- Clarkes
- Molalla
- Mulino
- Rural Dell

=== Charter schools ===
- Molalla River Academy (K-8)
- Renaissance Public Academy (3-12)

=== Closed schools ===
- Dickey Prairie Elementary School
- Maple Grove Elementary School
