= Horace Baker Log Cabin =

Historic house in Oregon, United States

- U.S. National Register of Historic Places
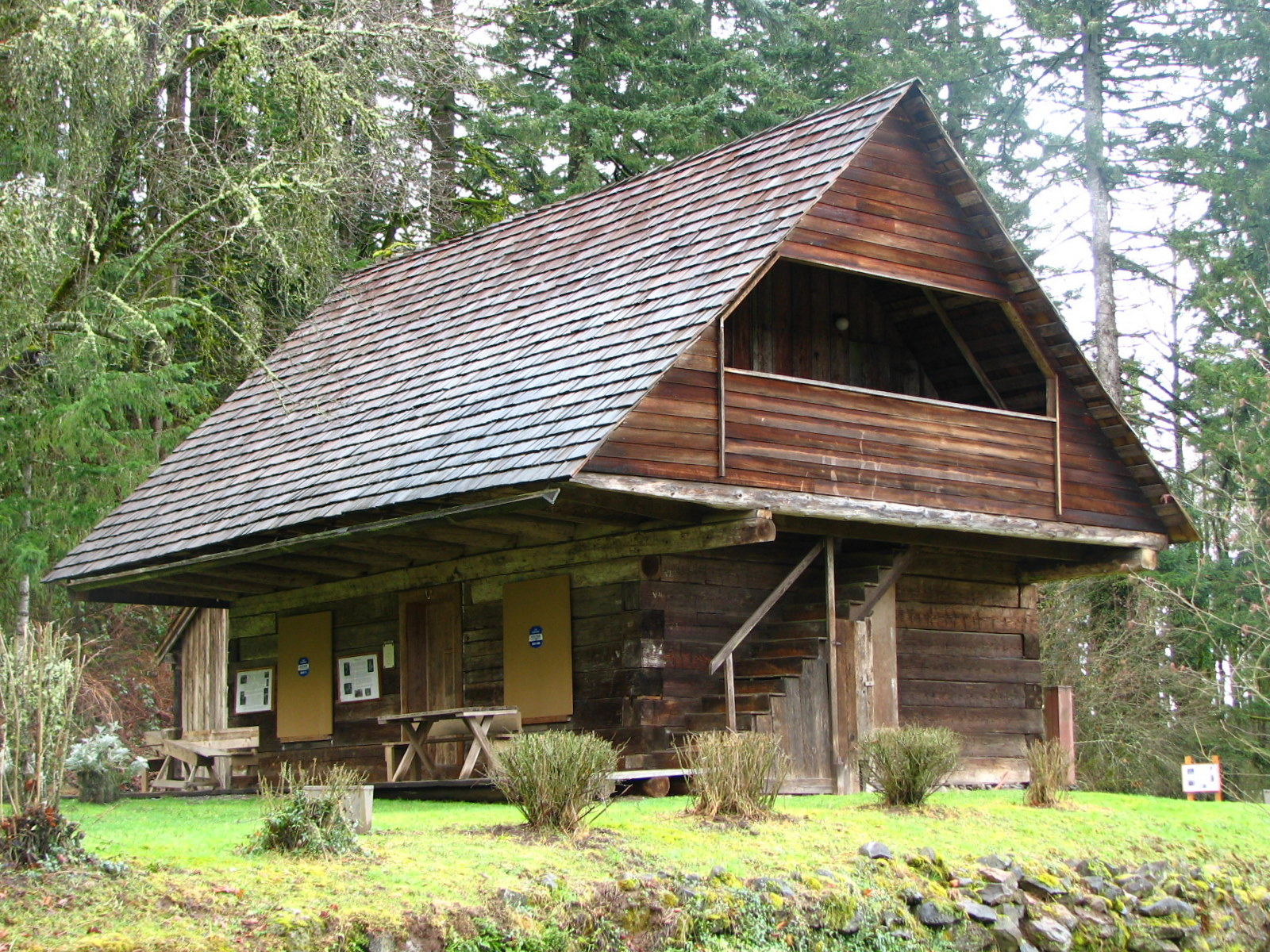
- The Baker Cabin in 2009
- Location: 18006 S. Gronlund Road; Carver, Oregon
- Nearest city: Oregon City
- Coordinates: 45°23′24″N 122°29′48″W
- Area: 1 acre (0.40 ha)
- Built: ca. 1856
- Built by: Horace Baker
- Architectural style: Log cabin
- Restored: 1939
- Restored by: Old Timers' Association of Oregon
- NRHP reference No.: 76001578
- Added to NRHP: December 12, 1976

The Horace Baker Log Cabin is a historic log cabin located near Carver, Oregon, United States. It was built around 1856 by American pioneer Horace Baker.

The cabin was later listed on the National Register of Historic Places in 1976.

== See also ==
- National Register of Historic Places listings in Clackamas County, Oregon
