= List of Oregon area codes =

The U.S. state of Oregon is divided into two telephone numbering plan areas in the North American Numbering Plan (NANP), which are served by a two overlay area codes each.

In the initial nationwide telephone numbering plan of 1947, Oregon was a single numbering plan area with area code 503. Area code 541 was split off in 1995, the 971 overlay of 503 became active in 2000, and the 458 overlay of 541 became active in 2010.

Area code	Year	Parent NPA	Overlay	Numbering plan area
503	1947	–	503/971	Northwestern corner of Oregon, including Portland and its metropolitan area, Salem and other cities
971	2000	503	503/971	Northwestern corner of Oregon, including Portland and its metropolitan area, Salem and other cities
541	1995	503	458/541	All of Oregon outside the northwestern corner, including Eugene
458	2010	541	458/541	All of Oregon outside the northwestern corner, including Eugene

== See also ==
- List of North American Numbering Plan area codes
