= Paul Savas =

American politician

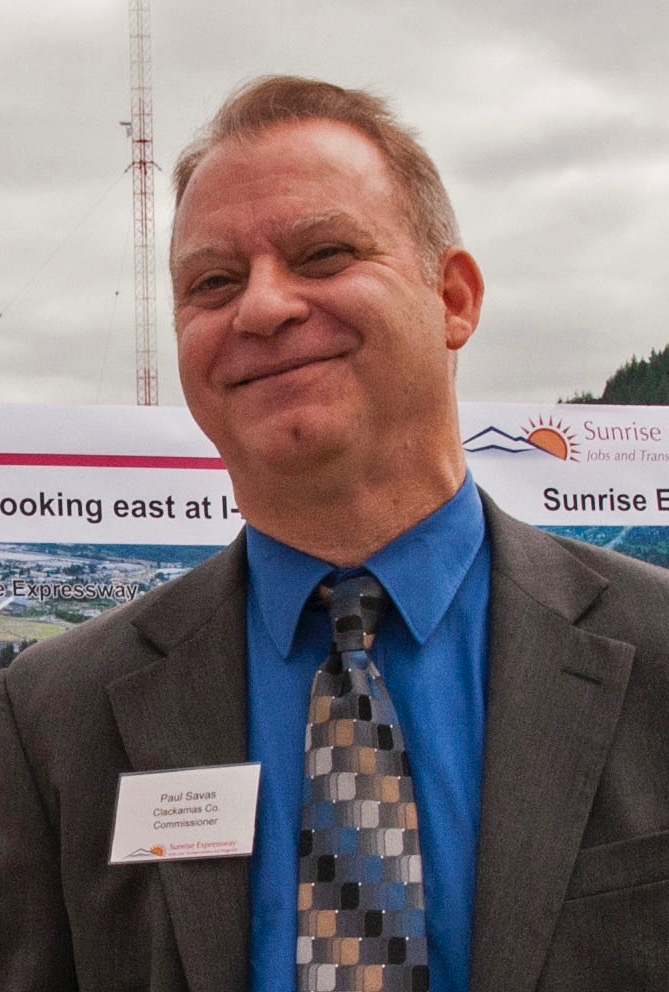

Clackamas County Commissioner
- Incumbent
- Assumed office January 2011

Personal details
- Party: Republican
- Profession: Small Businessman, Owner of Savas Tuning

Paul Savas is one of five members elected to the Clackamas County Commission in the State of Oregon. He is the only Clackamas County commissioner who resides in urban unincorporated Clackamas County.

== Early life and career ==
Savas grew up in Southern California, in what was once rural Orange County. He moved to Eugene in the mid-1980s with his wife Suzanne and after starting Savas Tuning in 1983, he moved his family and business to Oak Grove, Oregon. Savas said he has always been mechanically inclined, even from a young age. He holds a degree in automotive technology from Cypress College in Southern California.

== Political career ==
Savas narrowly defeated Bob Austin in the 2010 election for County commissioner. Savas' initial reasons for getting involved with politics was a concern over local land use issues. He said he had always thought that government was a well-oiled machine but learned that its "inefficiencies and inconsistencies" needed immediate attention. He later won elections to the Oak Lodge Water District and then the Oak Lodge Sanitary District boards. He has been involved in Clackamas County politics ever since.

Savas has won reelection as a Clackamas County commissioner three times—in 2014, 2018, and 2022—and has twice lost elections for Clackamas County chair in 2012 and 2016. In running for county chair, he cited the importance of the positions ability to set the "agenda and 'establishing the priorities and goals' of the county."

== Personal life ==
Savas lives in unincorporated Oak Grove with his wife, Suzanne, and their two kids. He owns and operates Savas Tuning.
