= Wilhoit Springs =

County park in Clackamas, Oregon

Coordinates: 45°03′08″N 122°34′06″W

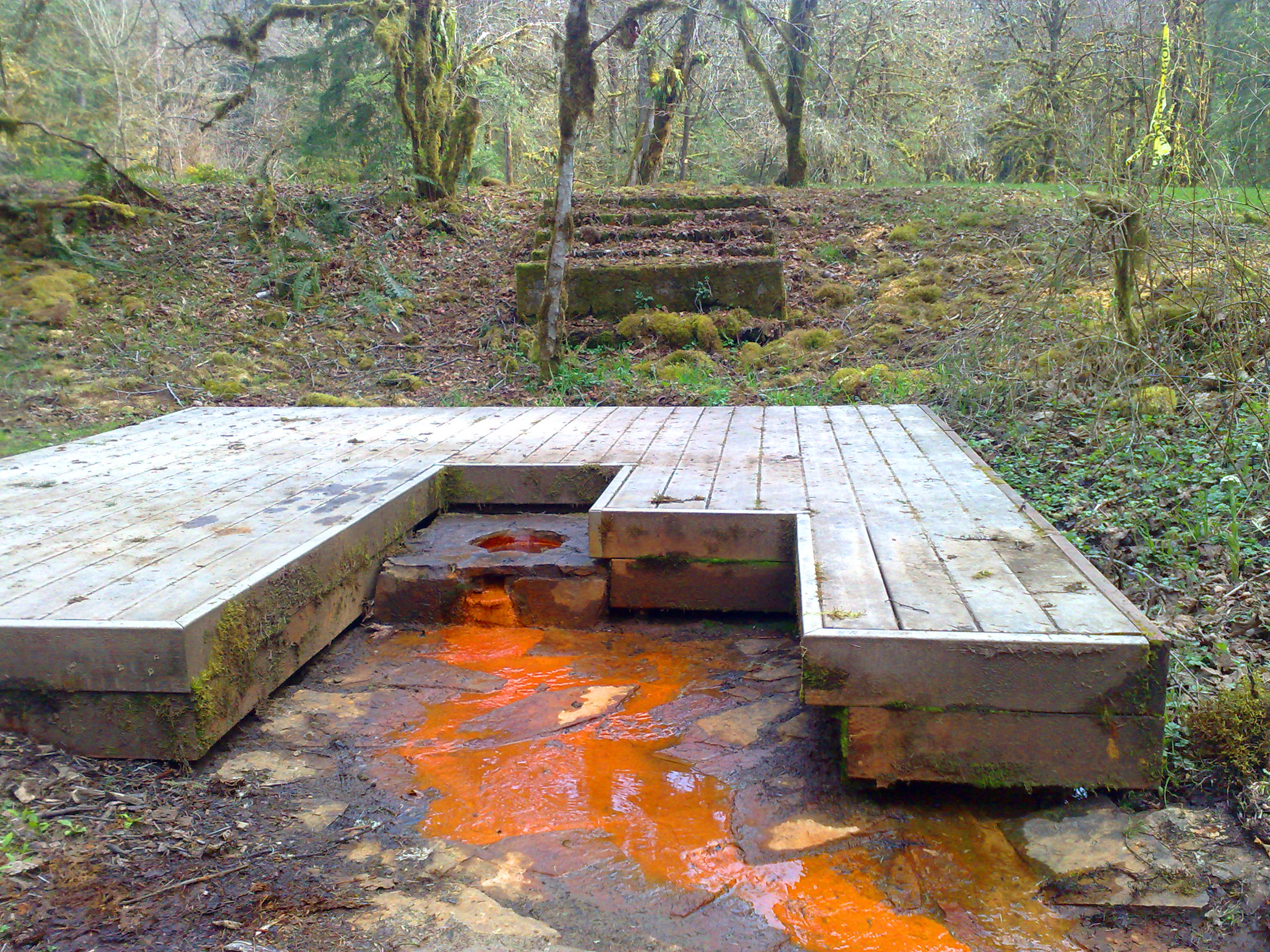
The bathhouse at Wilhoit Springs Resort was built over the soda springs. Today, all that's left is the foundation, and a deck built by the county to make it easier for visitors to access the waters.

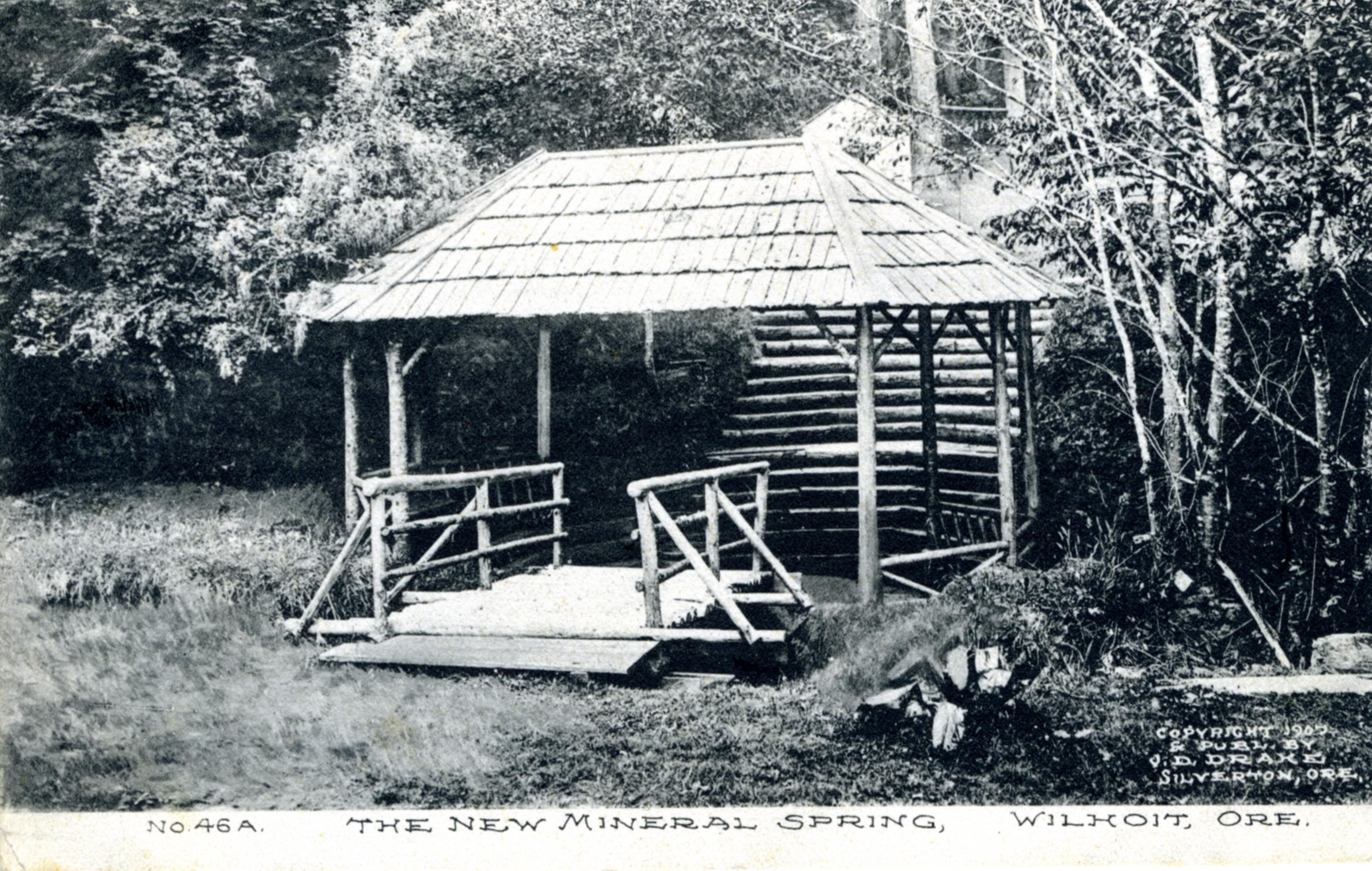
The New Mineral Spring, 1911

Wilhoit Springs is a county park located in Clackamas County, Oregon, deep in the foothills of the Cascade Mountains, roughly 8 miles southeast of Molalla. Around the turn of the 20th century, the spa and resort there was one of Clackamas County's most popular tourist destinations. However, in the first few decades of the 20th century the facility lost popularity and, in 1928, closed down.

== History ==
=== Development as a resort ===
Wilhoit Springs was named after the pioneer who perfected a land claim on it in 1866, John Wilhoit. A few years later, Wilhoit sold the property to a developer, Frank McLaren, who dreamed of a rustic but world-class destination resort there and got right to work making it happen. A decade or so later, McLaren had built a big hotel, a bathhouse and several other buildings on the park-like grounds. A post office was opened in 1882.

The resort was very successful for many years – so much so that when the hotel caught fire and burned down, McLeran replaced it with a rustic palace built of logs.

For a time McLeran marketed bottles of Wilhoit Springs water in markets locally and in Portland.

=== Decline and closure ===
By the 1920s, however, mainstream medicine was winning decisive victories against rival healing traditions such as eclectic medicine and hydropathy, which were perceived as less scientific, particularly after the Flexner Report was released in 1910. A significant part of Wilhoit Springs' business came from the perception among believers in hydropathy that a visit to a spa was not a luxury, but rather a medical necessity. The changing perception of medicine eventually eliminated that perception and the number of clients coming to spas like Wilhoit to "take the cure" started dropping off.

In 1928, the hotel caught fire again, and once again burned to the ground. This time there were neither resources to rebuild it nor sufficient projected business to justify doing so. Without the hotel, and more importantly the store and restaurant it housed, Wilhoit Springs was little more than a picnic area with a bathhouse. McLeran closed the post office, and Wilhoit Springs' glory days were officially over.

=== After the closure ===
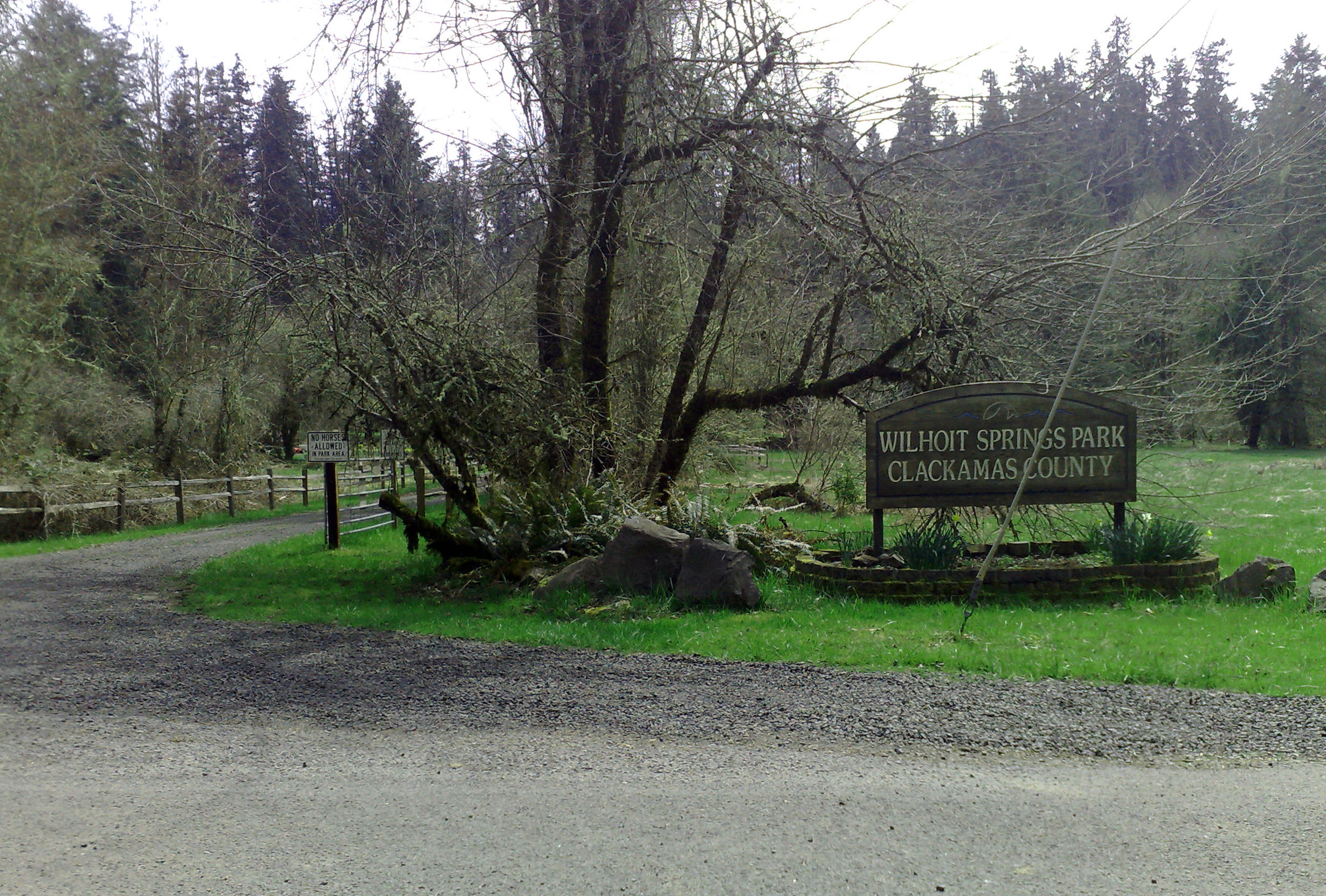
The entrance to Wilhoit Springs County Park, spring 2009.

For many decades the site languished in private ownership as part of a farm, while the buildings on the site fell into disrepair. Dry rot and windstorms eventually claimed all the empty structures on the site. By the mid-1970s, when Clackamas County acquired the site as a park, all that was left was McLaren's residence – which today serves as the park caretaker's house – and the concrete foundation from the bathhouse, which was built directly over the outlet for the soda springs.

Eventually the county fixed the park up. Today it is a well-kept pastoral setting, with a broad field studded with old-growth fir trees and a path leading to the soda spring and around to an old cast-iron hand pump used to tap the mineral spring.

== The waters ==
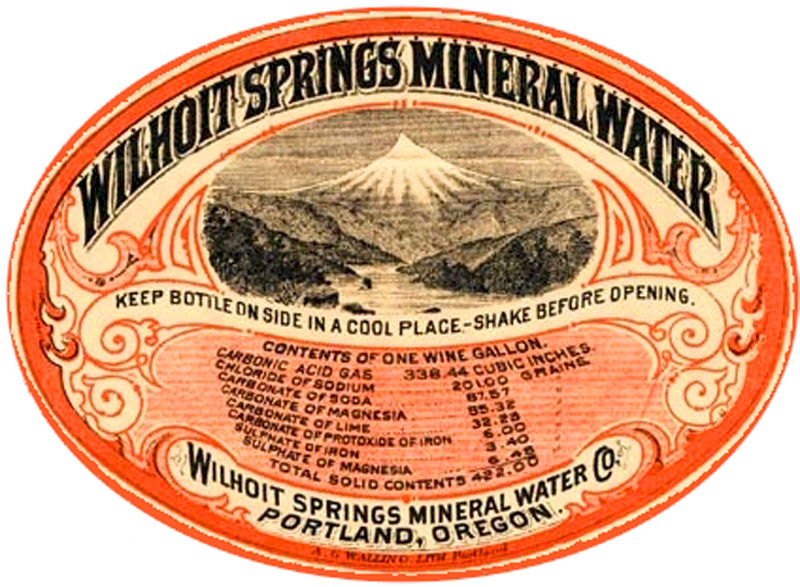
For many years, Wilhoit Springs Resort marketed its water in bottles bearing this label in local markets and as far away as Portland.

Wilhoit Springs boasts two different springs; a soda spring, located in the foundation of the old bathhouse, and a mineral spring. In the soda spring, the water bubbles out of the ground very cold and powerfully charged with carbon dioxide; at the mineral spring, it is heavier, less effervescent and seems noticeably thickened by its mineral load.

=== Mineral content ===
According to an analysis by one J.H. Veach, M.D., cited by George Edward Walton, one pint of the water from the soda springs contains:

- 10.946 grains of carbonate of soda [washing soda]
- 10.665 grains of carbonate of magnesia [similar to "Milk of Magnesia"]
- 0.75 grains of iron protoxide carbonate [ore-grade iron]
- 4.028 grains of carbonate of lime [the active ingredient in many antacids]
- 25.125 grains of chloride of sodium [table salt]
- 0.425 grains of sulfate of sodium [Glauber's salt]
- 0.810 grains of sulfate of magnesia [epsom salt]
- 42 cubic inches of carbonic acid [carbon dioxide gas].

Other sources also list iron sulfate, a common form of nutritional-supplement iron, in the water.

"According to the above analysis, these waters are of great value," Walton continued. "They are of the alkaline-saline class, and closely resemble some of the finest waters of Europe, such as the Seltzer."

=== Medicinal claims ===
In large enough quantities a water like this could provide real relief from heartburn, constipation, certain skin conditions and iron-deficiency anemia, so it's not surprising the waters developed a reputation for medical efficacy.

Not all medicinal claims made about Wilhoit Springs water hold up to scrutiny, though. One particular pamphlet boasted that the water "RELIEVES THE APPETITE FOR DRINK":

"It is the much appreciated experience of many drinking men that this water will satisfy the craving for strong drink in a most remarkable manner," the advertisement announced. "The victim of drink finds Wilhoit Water a most refreshing, enlivening and invigorating draught which leaves no sting behind and no distressing reaction. … For that particular nervousness after a period of excessive drinking, the water used freely is admirable in its effect to soothe and quiet body and mind."

A persistent local rumor has suggested that the water contains lithium. Based on chemical analysis, this does not appear to be the case. However, suggestions that the water has some sort of mood-altering quality go back to the very founding of the resort. Walton quotes a physician as reporting in a medical journal that "Very pleasant to the taste, (the water) exhilarates fully as much as wine on the first day, and on the second operates as a laxative and diuretic."

As a side note, those who have experienced both wine and Wilhoit Springs water may be somewhat skeptical about this claim.

=== Beer brewing ===
The water from Wilhoit Springs is sometimes collected by home brewers to use as a basis for styles of ale that benefit from a strong mineral-salt base, such as India Pale Ale.
