= Jennings Lodge, Oregon =

Unincorporated community in the state of Oregon, United States

- Census-designated place (CDP) & unincorporated community
- Location of Jennings Lodge, Oregon
- Coordinates: 45°23′35″N 122°36′55″W
- Country: United States
- State: Oregon
- County: Clackamas

Area
  - Total: 1.67 sq mi (4.32 km^{2})
  - Land: 1.59 sq mi (4.12 km^{2})
  - Water: 0.077 sq mi (0.20 km^{2})
- Elevation: 95 ft (29 m)

Population (2020)
  - Total: 7,503
  - Density: 4,720/sq mi (1,822.5/km^{2})
- Time zone: UTC-8 (Pacific (PST))
  - Summer (DST): UTC-7 (PDT)
- ZIP Code: 97267
- Area code: 503
- FIPS code: 41-37400
- GNIS feature ID: 2408444

Jennings Lodge is a census-designated place and unincorporated community in Clackamas County, Oregon, United States. Located between Milwaukie and Gladstone. As of the 2020 census, it had a total population of 7,503.

Even though Jennings Lodge is not part of Oregon City; the local elementary school (along with nearby Candy Lane Elementary) forms an exclave of the Oregon City School District.

== History ==
According to Oregon Geographic Names, Jennings Lodge was platted as a townsite in 1905 and named after Berryman Jennings, an Oregon pioneer, one of whose children still owned Jennings' house in 1927.

== Geography ==
Jennings Lodge is located along the Willamette River.

According to the United States Census Bureau, the CDP has a total area of 1.7 square miles (4.4 km^{2}), of which 1.6 square miles (4.1 km^{2}) is land and 0.1 square miles (0.26 km^{2}) is water. The total area is 5.85% water.

== Demographics ==
Historical population
Census	Pop.	Note	%±
2020	7,503		—
U.S. Decennial Census

As of the census of 2000, there were 7036 people in the area, organized into 2840 households and 1800 families. The population density was 4,368.1 inhabitants per square mile (1,686.5/km^{2}). There were 3,004 housing units at an average density of 1,864.9 per square mile (720.0/km^{2}). The racial makeup of the CDP was 89.10% White, 1.42% Asian, 0.87% Black or African American, 0.47% Native American, 0.13% Pacific Islander, 5.30% from other races, and 2.71% from two or more races. 10.77% of the population were Hispanic or Latino of any race.

There were 2,840 households, out of which 30.5% had children under the age of 18 living with them, 45.7% were married couples living together, 12.1% had a female householder with no husband present, and 36.6% were non-families. 28.3% of all households were made up of individuals, and 12.8% had someone living alone who was 65 years of age or older. The average household size was 2.47 and the average family size was 3.03.

The population was spread out, with 25.1% under the age of 18, 9.8% from 18 to 24, 29.9% from 25 to 44, 21.6% from 45 to 64, and 13.6% who were 65 years of age or older. The median age was 36 years. For every 100 females, there were 94.5 males. For every 100 females age 18 and over, there were 91.4 males.

The median income for a household in the CDP was $43,159, and the median income for a family was $50,996. Males had a median income of $38,850 versus $26,913 for females. The per capita income for the CDP was $19,891. 10.5% of the population and 6.8% of families were below the poverty line. Out of the total population, 15.0% of those under the age of 18 and 5.2% of those 65 and older were living below the poverty line.
