= Molalla Prairie, Oregon =

Unincorporated community in the state of Oregon, United States

Molalla Prairie
- Location within the state of Oregon Molalla Prairie (the United States)
- Coordinates: 45°7′44″N 122°35′56″W
- Country: United States
- State: Oregon
- County: Clackamas
- Time zone: UTC-8 (Pacific (PST))
  - Summer (DST): UTC-7 (PDT)
- ZIP codes: 97038

Molalla Prairie is an unincorporated community of approximately 3,500 residents in Clackamas County, Oregon, United States. The community is located south of Molalla.

In June 2009, 178 residents of the area signed petitions calling for a vote on forming a hamlet, hoping it would give the area more political clout on issues such as opposition to a natural gas pipeline through the area and agritourism. In March 2010, residents within the boundaries of the proposed hamlet voted in favor of formation by a 75–60 vote. On April 1, 2010, the hamlet came into existence after the Clackamas County Board of Commissioners approved the formation.

In October 2014, all members of the hamlet's board of directors voted to resign and donate the hamlet's trust fund to the nearby hamlet of Beavercreek. The future of the community remains uncertain.
