= Riverside, Clackamas County, Oregon =

Unincorporated community in Clackamas County, Oregon

Riverside
- Unincorporated community
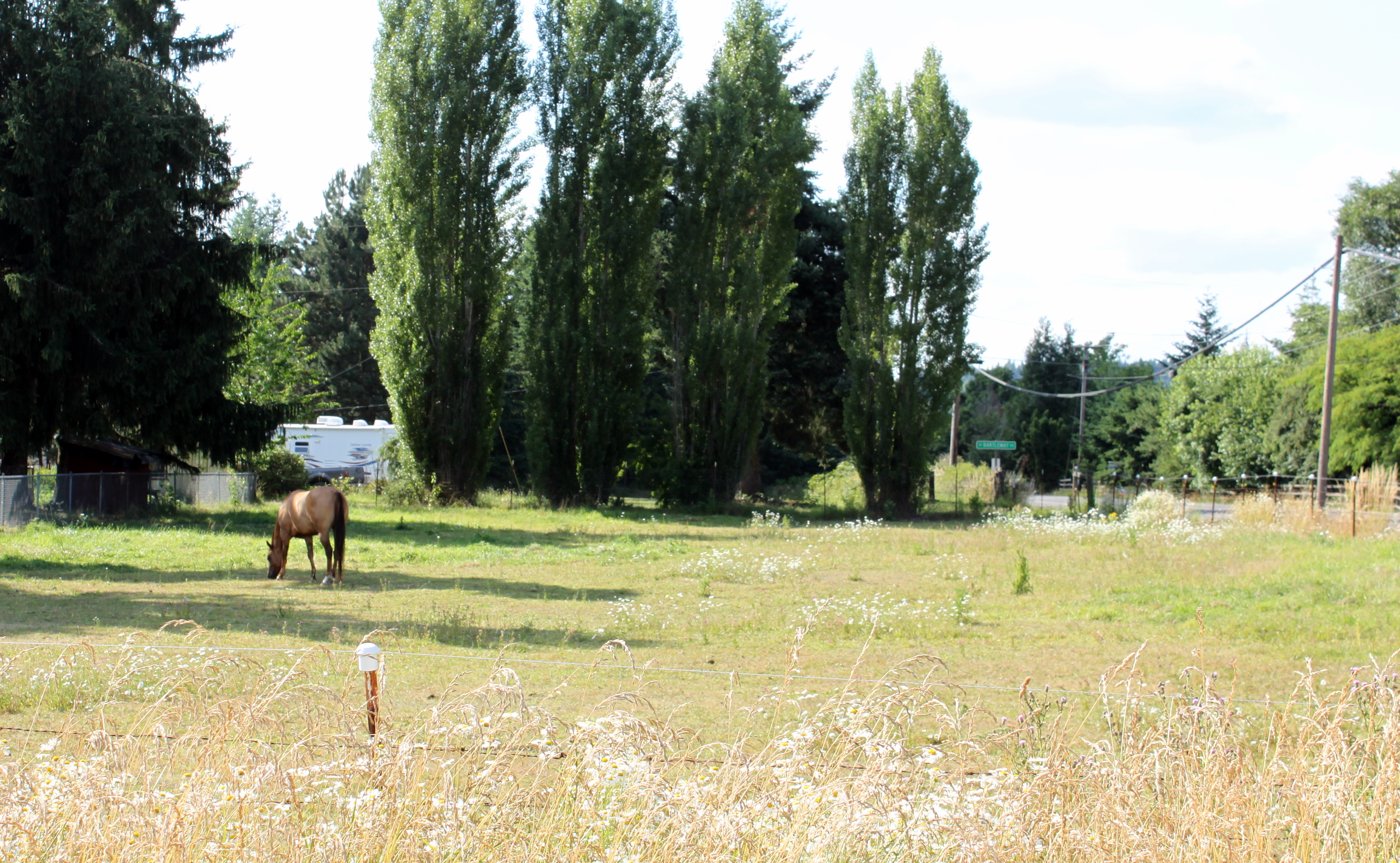
- Riverside in 2009

- Location within the state of Oregon Riverside (the United States)
- Coordinates: 45°22′34″N 122°23′14″W
- Country: United States
- State: Oregon
- County: Clackamas
- Elevation: 292 ft (89 m)
- Time zone: UTC-8 (Pacific (PST))
  - Summer (DST): UTC-7 (PDT)
- GNIS feature ID: 1163847

Riverside is an unincorporated, historic community in Clackamas County, Oregon, United States. It lies at an elevation of 292 feet (89 m).
