= Beavercreek, Oregon =

Unincorporated town in Oregon, United States

- Census-designated place
- Location within the state of Oregon Beavercreek (the United States)
- Coordinates: 45°16′29″N 122°29′18″W
- Country: United States
- State: Oregon
- County: Clackamas

Area
  - Total: 20.12 sq mi (52.10 km^{2})
  - Land: 20.10 sq mi (52.05 km^{2})
  - Water: 0.015 sq mi (0.04 km^{2})
- Elevation: 666 ft (203 m)

Population (2020)
  - Total: 4,727
  - Density: 235.2/sq mi (90.81/km^{2})
- Time zone: UTC-8 (Pacific (PST))
  - Summer (DST): UTC-7 (PDT)
- ZIP code: 97004
- FIPS code: 41-05250
- GNIS feature ID: 2584404

Beavercreek is an unincorporated hamlet and census-designated place in Clackamas County, Oregon, United States, located 6 miles (10 km) southeast of Oregon City. As of the 2020 census, Beavercreek had a population of 4,727.

== Demographics ==
Historical population
Census	Pop.	Note	%±
2020	4,727		—
U.S. Decennial Census

=== 2020 census ===
As of the 2020 census, Beavercreek had a population of 4,727. The median age was 47.6 years. 19.1% of residents were under the age of 18 and 21.8% of residents were 65 years of age or older. For every 100 females there were 104.7 males, and for every 100 females age 18 and over there were 107.8 males age 18 and over.

41.7% of residents lived in urban areas, while 58.3% lived in rural areas.

There were 1,699 households in Beavercreek, of which 30.0% had children under the age of 18 living in them. Of all households, 71.1% were married-couple households, 12.4% were households with a male householder and no spouse or partner present, and 11.5% were households with a female householder and no spouse or partner present. About 11.9% of all households were made up of individuals and 5.6% had someone living alone who was 65 years of age or older.

There were 1,752 housing units, of which 3.0% were vacant. The homeowner vacancy rate was 1.0% and the rental vacancy rate was 0.7%.

Racial composition as of the 2020 census
Race	Number	Percent
White	4,197	88.8%
Black or African American	28	0.6%
American Indian and Alaska Native	40	0.8%
Asian	58	1.2%
Native Hawaiian and Other Pacific Islander	1	0.0%
Some other race	78	1.7%
Two or more races	325	6.9%
Hispanic or Latino (of any race)	204	4.3%

== History ==
According to Oregon Geographic Names, the name "Beaver Creek" was first used for a school district in this area in the early 1850s. It was named for the creek that flows through the community and into the Willamette River. A post office operated under various names in the locality until 1922, when the name was changed to Beavercreek, the form still used today. Beavercreek's ZIP code is 97004.

In the summer of 2006, the citizens of Beavercreek voted to become Oregon's first hamlet, a system of quasi-government which exists in Clackamas County, Oregon. A final hearing by the board of county commissioners on the formation of the hamlet took place in September 2006, and officially recognized the community as The Hamlet of Beavercreek. The hamlet holds monthly community meetings at the Beavercreek Grange hall, except for quarterly town hall meetings, which may be held at other locations to accommodate attendance.

== Education ==
The community is served by the Oregon City School District, Canby School District, Colton School District, and Molalla River School District. Beavercreek Elementary School is located in the Hamlet.

== Points of interest ==
=== Miller House ===
Just after 1900, the Miller family built a farm house on the corner of what is now Ridge Road and Lower Highland Road. The home was moved to keep it from being destroyed and is being restored by current Beavercreek residents Rick and Kassandra Young. The Miller House was the childhood home of Ava Helen Miller, who married Linus Pauling, the only person to be awarded two unshared Nobel Prizes (for chemistry in 1954 and for peace in 1962).

=== Geocaching ===
Beavercreek is the birthplace of geocaching. The first documented placement of a GPS-located cache took place on May 3, 2000, by Dave Ulmer of Beavercreek a few miles east of the community.

== Notable residents ==
- Matt Bunch, state legislator
- Tonya Harding, figure skater
- Ava Helen Pauling (Miller), human rights activist, wife of Linus Pauling
