= Oregon City School District (Oregon) =

School district in Clackamas County, Oregon, United States

Address
- 1417 12th Street Oregon City, Oregon, 97045; United States

District information
- Type: Public
- Grades: K–12
- Established: November 13, 1874
- Superintendent: Dayle Spitzer

Students and staff
- Students: 7,874
- Teachers: 386
- Staff: 212

Other information
- Website: ocsd62.org

The Oregon City School District serves the city of Oregon City, Oregon and some unincorporated areas of southwestern Clackamas County, including the hamlet of Beavercreek and the community of Jennings Lodge, which is physically separated from the rest of the district by the Gladstone School District. It is the 16th largest district in the state of Oregon, with 7,874 students enrolled for the 2017–18 academic year.

== History ==
=== Early years of pioneer schools ===
In 1843 the first school in Oregon City was established on the top floor of Sidney Moss' hotel, The Main Street House although it was only in operation for approximately 12 months. In 1849 General Joseph Lane, the first Territorial Governor sent a message to the early legislators recommending a system of “free and public schools”. Shortly after, in 1850 Reverend Dr. George Atkinson recommended building an all-female school on land donated by Dr John McLoughlin. Money was gathered for construction by many families in the area including Governor George Abernathy whom loaned $6,000 to the project. By 1851 construction had reached more than $10,000, although a section of the interior was left unfinished due to economic shortfalls. Due to ongoing financial problems the school property reverted to Gov. Abernathy due to the unpaid loan. In 1850 the Methodist Episcopal Conference bought the building and land in 1856. Reopening 2 years later now called the Oregon City Seminary the newly co-ed school was headed by Rev. Dr George Atkinson starting in 1861. Rev. Dr. Atkinson was a force in the education of Clackamas County, working tirelessly through his life to open a total of 88 schools in the still rural area.

Again in 1853 Sydney Moss offered the school room in his hotel for the city to establish a free public school. He offered to house the teacher and provide the room for 3 years. In 1854 the local territorial legislator passed an act to create a school district in Oregon City. The action gave the city council the power to act as a school board and by May 1855 Moss’ offer was accepted by the city council and a primary school was established. After the three years the school moved from the hotel to a building owned by Dr John McLoughlin located in the lower part of town, which the City rented for $8 a month. The first superintendent of schools was elected in March 1857, Doctor Forbes Barclay and an 1862 he suggested that the city council rent the building of the Oregon City Seminary for $150 a year and Reverend Atkinson was retained as principal. At this point this property was deeded to the city council in 1867 to be used for a “free and public school. It was the first publicly owned school property in the city. On August 3, 1853, the first public school was finally established by the city council on this site.

=== Forming a district ===
The year 1872 saw the passing of a law to give County School superintendents the authorization to establish districts. Although Oregon City did not establish a district until the City Council released control to the school board. School District Number 62 was formed November 13, 1874. The seminary building was finally torn down in 1889 after being in use for 38 years to make way to build a replacement school with 6 rooms called Barclay School. Barclay was one of many local schools at the time including, 7th Street School (later called Eastham), Canemah, Lower Logan, Beavercreek, Maple Lane, Mt. Pleasant, Park Place, Holcomb, Crescent, Henrici, Hazeldale, Twilight, Jennings Lodge, Clairmont, and Echo Dell. Newer versions of several of these first schools still functioned in the district well into the 20th Century. The first Oregon City High School building was constructed in 1910 on the corner of 12th and John Adams and opened in September 1911. The district grew so rapidly that in 1915 a bond was approved to expand the facilities and by 1936, a new three-story brick building was built. When they moved the high school population to the new building, the former High School building was used as Oregon City Junior High from 1936 to 1955. Sadly by 1954 the building was overloaded with more than 500 students and was judged unsafe. In 1954 a bond was again passed to build a new Junior High named Thora B. Gardiner Junior High School; joined by Ogden Junior High School 10 years later in 1965 and Moss Junior High School in 1976. Although by the late eighties the district was growing, and in 1985 Moss Jr high school was closed and converted to a freshman only campus opening in 1989 leaving the Oregon City High School with only 10th through 12th graders. Due to changing districts and budget shortfalls in 1985 Barclay Elementary was closed and the students were rerouted to other local elementary schools. Eastham Elementary followed being shuttered in 1992 although the district re-purposed the building and opened it as a community schools’ hub.

=== The new millennium ===
Many changes took place as the district headed into the new millennium. The budget troubles and overcrowding that had played out through the 1990s continued. The district passed a bond in 2000 for a much-needed new high school. Construction started in 2001, with the school being completed in 2003. The school was built on Moss freshman campus’ Beavercreek road property and is still currently in use today. In 2009 the district looking for a way to balance the budget looked over several proposals including a shortened four-day school week or the possibility of closing another elementary school. At the end of the 2008–09 school year the district settled on closing Park Place Elementary. With Oregon City continuing to grow more changes where needed and in 2012 the district elected to close two elementary schools. Mt. Pleasant and King closed at the end of the school year and the school board reformatted the middle schools to a 3-year program now including 6th grade. In March 2014, the City of Oregon City uncovered historical documents that noted the property gifted to the school district to use for Barclay School was given with the clause of being used for a “free and public school”. Barclay Elementary was closed in 1985 and had been functioning as a community school building bringing in rental revenue for the district. With this newly found information the city and the school district came to an agreement. The city needed a new police station badly and the district needed a clear title to the Barclay site and funds for improvements throughout the district. Although they have not release details of the transfer, construction started at the Mt. Pleasant site in the summer of 2019.

=== 2018 Bond ===
In November 2018 Oregon City Voters approved a 158-million-dollar bond. This money when added to state matching grants of between 3.7 and 8 million dollars is planned to be used to upgrade and replace current middle and elementary schools. The average age as of 2018 of the Middle and Elementary schools in use in Oregon City School District is 61 years, with two being over 80 years old. It is planned that Gardiner Middle School will be replaced with a new school at the current site. Ogden Middle School will be expanded and the current portable classrooms in use will be eliminated. The two middle schools are over 140% capacity as the city continues to grow. The remainder of the bond's funds are earmarked for infrastructure updates throughout the district to heating, plumbing, and structural concerns. Also planned are security overhauls to many of the buildings, adding a lock down system and entry cameras to enhance student safety.

=== OCSD's Strategic Plan 2023-2027 ===
In 2023, Oregon City School District adopted a Strategic Plan to guide its work from 2024 through 2027. Developed through extensive community engagement—including surveys, focus groups, and a diverse steering committee—the plan outlines five districtwide priorities: student success, student and staff well-being, equity, stakeholder engagement, and effective resource management. The Strategic Plan serves as a roadmap for decision-making, ensuring that programs and investments reflect the values and needs of the Oregon City community.

=== 150 Years as a District ===
The Oregon City School District celebrated its 150th anniversary on November 3, 2024, marking a century and a half since its official establishment in 1874. Commemorative events included school tours, a community celebration at the Oregon City Service Learning Academy's new home in the historic Eastham campus, and the recognition of 150 community members for their contributions to the district.

=== 2025 Bond ===
Continuing its long-range capital development plan, the district passed a $158 million bond in 2018, leading to the complete rebuild of Gardiner Middle School and a comprehensive renovation of Tumwata Middle School, both completed in 2021. These projects addressed overcrowding and modernized facilities, including security upgrades across all schools.

In July 2024, the school board unanimously voted to place a $163 million bond measure on the November 2024 ballot. This bond aimed to fund critical repairs and upgrades to the district's aging elementary schools and targeted improvements at Oregon City High School. The measure was approved by voters, marking the third phase of the district's long-range facilities plan.

== Student/Teacher Ratio ==
According to the National Center of Education Statistics for the 2017–18 school year the district has 20.83 students for every teacher, which is slightly better that the state average of 22:1.

== Demographics ==
During the 2017–18 academic year Oregon City had a on-time graduation rate of 83%, 5% about the state average of 77%. 32% of the enrolled students participate in the free or reduced lunch program, and 91% have all required vaccinations. In the same year 280 students or 3.5% of the student population was classified as homeless by the Oregon Department of Education.

Student Composite
Some students in more than one category	2017–18
American Indian/Alaska Native	1%
Asian	2%
African American	1%
Hispanic/Latino	13%
Multiracial	6%
Native Hawaiian/Pacific Islander	<1%
White	77%

== School Board ==
The board of directors consists of seven members, elected districtwide every four years:

Position	Name	Term ends
1	Michele Stroh	2029
2	Alex Halpern	2027
3	Michael Canchola (vice chair)	2029
4	Ryan Pitz	2029
5	Katie Wilson (chair)	2027
6	Heidi Blackwell	2027
7	Pamela White	2027

== Schools ==
The district has seven primary, two middle, two high schools, and three charter schools.

=== Preschool (years 3 and 4) ===
- Oregon City Early Learning Center

=== Elementary Schools (grades K–5) ===
- Beavercreek
- Candy Lane
- Gaffney Lane
- Holcomb
- John McLoughlin
- Redland

=== Middle Schools (grades 6–8) ===
- Gardiner Middle School
- Tumwata Middle School (formerly Ogden Middle School)

=== High School (grades 9–12) ===
- Oregon City High School
- Oregon City Service Learning Academy (OCSLA)

=== Charter Schools ===
- Springwater Environmental Sciences School (grades K–8)
- Alliance Charter Academy (grades K–12)
- Clackamas Academy of Industrial Sciences (CAIS) (grades 6-12)

=== Closed Schools ===
- Barclay Elementary (closed 1985)
- Logan Elementary (closed 1985)
- Moss Junior High (closed 1990)
- Eastham Elementary (closed 1992) *now home to OCSLA
- Park Place Elementary (closed 2009)
- Mt. Pleasant Elementary (closed 2012)
- King Elementary (closed 2012)
