= Logan, Oregon =

Unincorporated community in the state of Oregon, United States

- Unincorporated community
- Location within Oregon Location within the United States
- Coordinates: 45°20′36″N 122°25′22″W
- Country: United States
- State: Oregon
- County: Clackamas
- Elevation: 486 ft (148 m)
- Time zone: UTC-8 (Pacific (PST))
  - Summer (DST): UTC-7 (PDT)
- ZIP code: 97045
- Area codes: 503 and 971
- GNIS feature ID: 1123354

Logan is an unincorporated community in Clackamas County, Oregon, United States. It was named after politician and Civil War Major General John A. Logan. Its post office was established on June 13, 1884. Lafayette Hummiston(1840–1916) was its first postmaster. The office closed on October 12, 1903.
