= Clackamas County Courthouse =

Historic building in Oregon City, Oregon, US

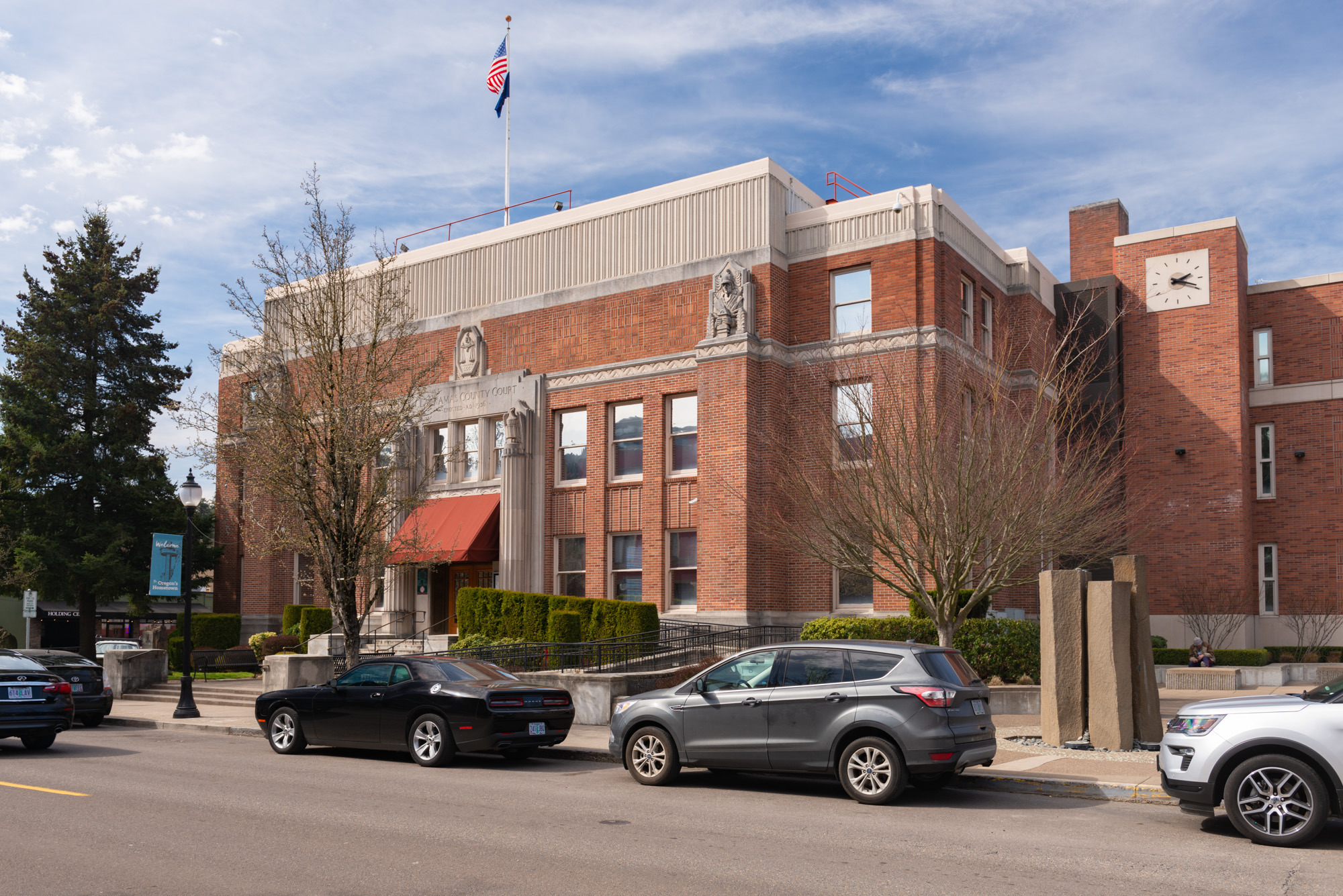
- The building's exterior, 2018
- Interactive map of the Clackamas County Courthouse area

General information
- Location: 807 Main Street; Oregon City, Oregon, U.S.
- Coordinates: 45.3586°N 122.6073°W

The Clackamas County Courthouse is an historic building in Oregon City, Oregon.
