= Macksburg Lutheran Church =

Historic church in Oregon, United States

- U.S. National Register of Historic Places
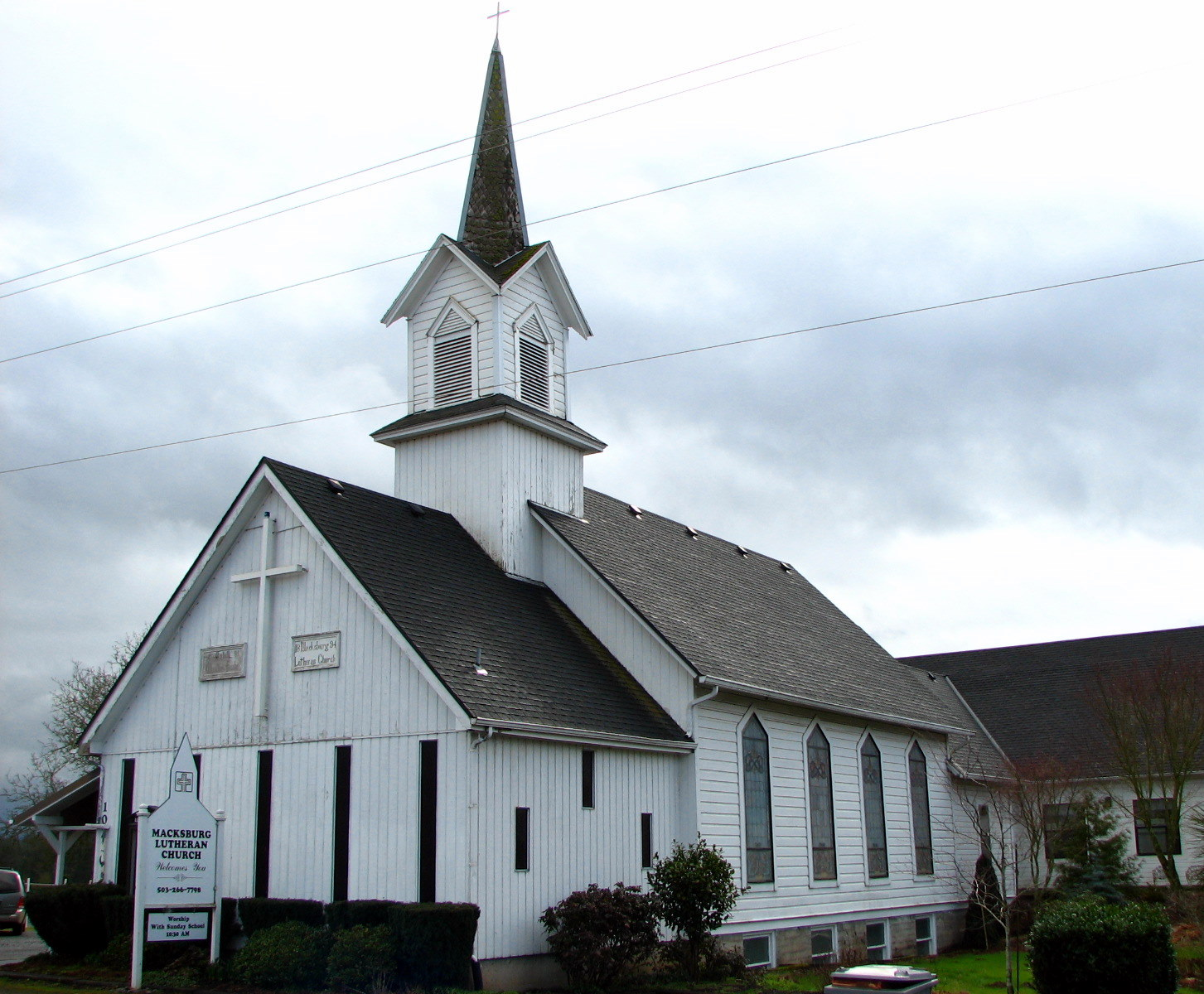
- Macksburg Lutheran Church in 2009

- Location within Oregon Location within the United States
- Location: 10190 S Macksburg Road, Canby, Oregon
- Coordinates: 45°12′49″N 122°39′25″W
- Built: 1892–94
- Architectural style: Carpenter Gothic
- NRHP reference No.: 82003722
- Added to NRHP: June 14, 1982

Macksburg Lutheran Church is a historic Lutheran church located in Canby, Oregon, United States. The church was built between 1892 and 1894, in order to serve the needs of German-speaking immigrants from Germany and Austria. Historically, the church offered sermons and Sunday school in both the German and English languages, on an alternating basis.

Macksburg Lutheran Church was listed on the National Register of Historic Places on June 14, 1982.
