= Marquam, Oregon =

Unincorporated community in the state of Oregon, United States

Marquam
- Unincorporated community
- Location within the state of Oregon Marquam (the United States)
- Coordinates: 45°04′23″N 122°41′13″W
- Country: United States
- State: Oregon
- County: Clackamas
- Elevation: 302 ft (92 m)
- Time zone: UTC-8 (Pacific (PST))
  - Summer (DST): UTC-7 (PDT)
- ZIP code: 97038
- Area codes: 503 and 971
- GNIS feature ID: 1136517

Marquam is an unincorporated community in Clackamas County, Oregon, United States. It is located on Oregon Route 213, between the cities of Molalla and Silverton. Marquam was named for pioneer settler Alfred Marquam, who came to Oregon in 1845 from the east (Maryland via Missouri). He secured a donation land claim of 640 acres (2.6 km^{2}), and built the first house and the first store in the town. In 1889 the Marquam post office was established and named for Alfred Marquam, who was also the first postmaster. His younger brother was Philip Augustus Marquam, a noted early judge in Oregon.
