= Clarkes, Oregon =

Unincorporated community in the state of Oregon, United States

Clarkes
- Unincorporated community
- Location within the state of Oregon Clarkes (the United States)
- Coordinates: 45.215°N 122.471°W
- Country: United States
- State: Oregon
- County: Clackamas
- Elevation: 889 ft (271 m)
- Time zone: UTC-8 (Pacific (PST))
  - Summer (DST): UTC-7 (PDT)
- GNIS feature ID: 1158165

Clarkes is an unincorporated crossroads community in central Clackamas County, Oregon, United States.
