= Clackamas County, Oregon =

County in Oregon, United States

- County
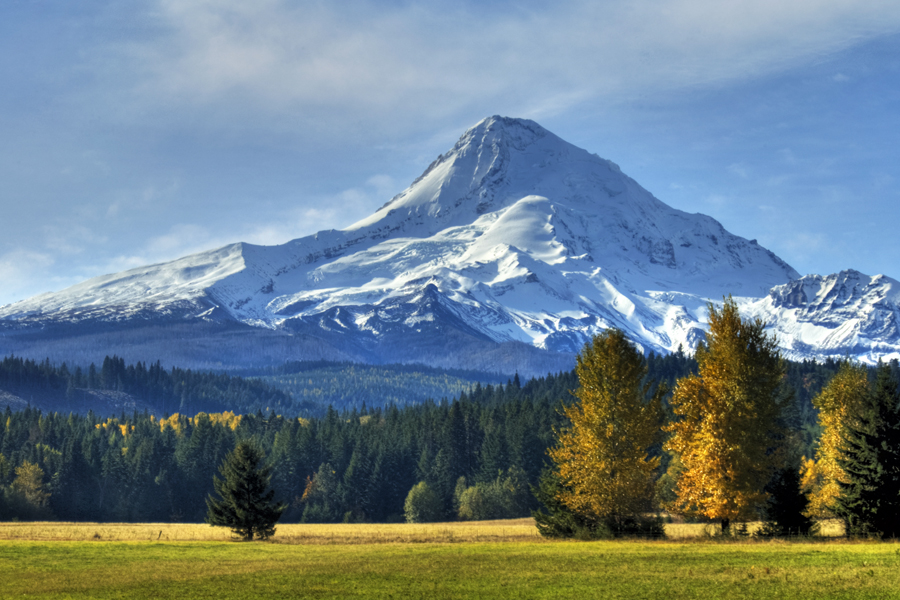
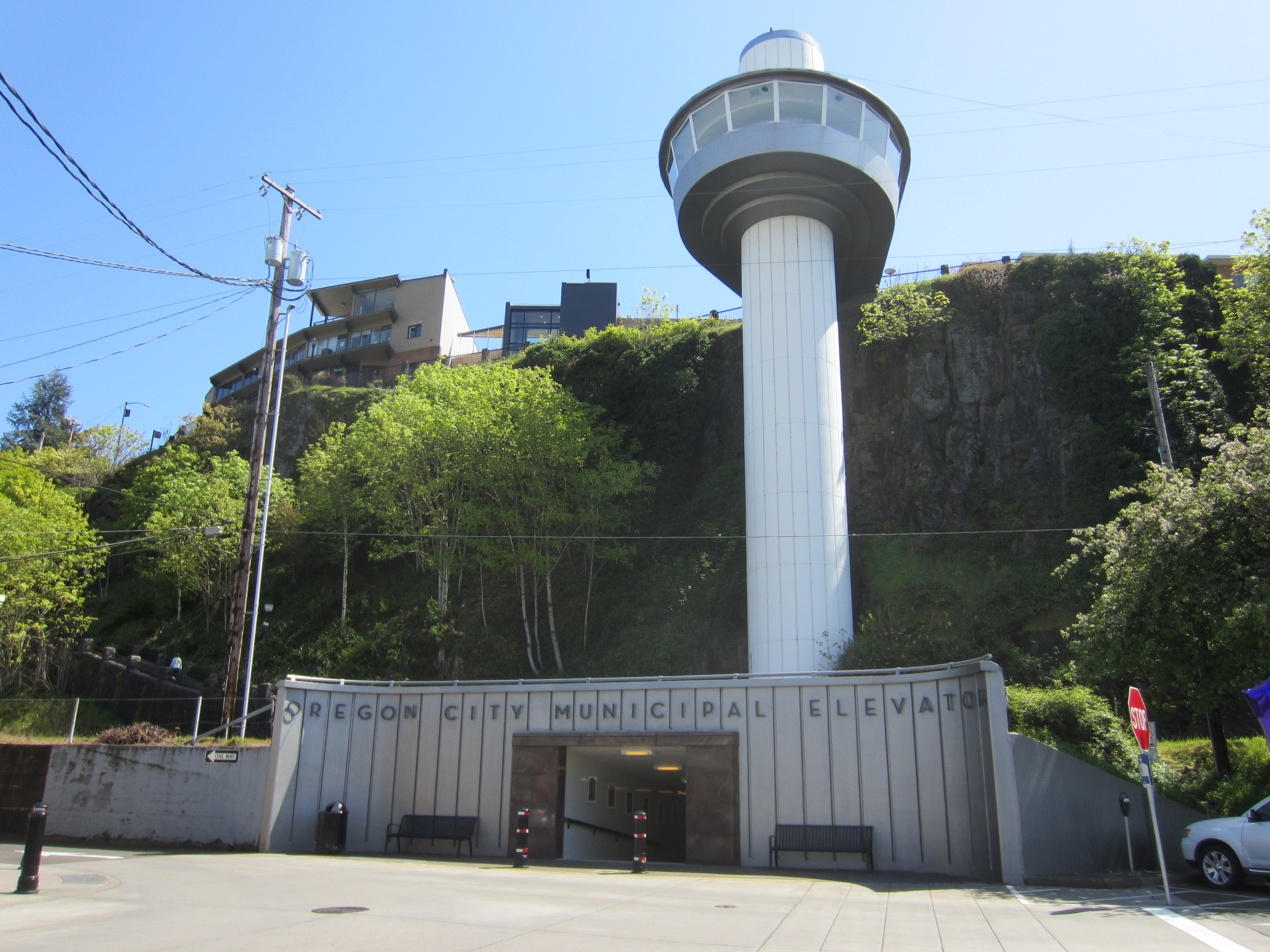
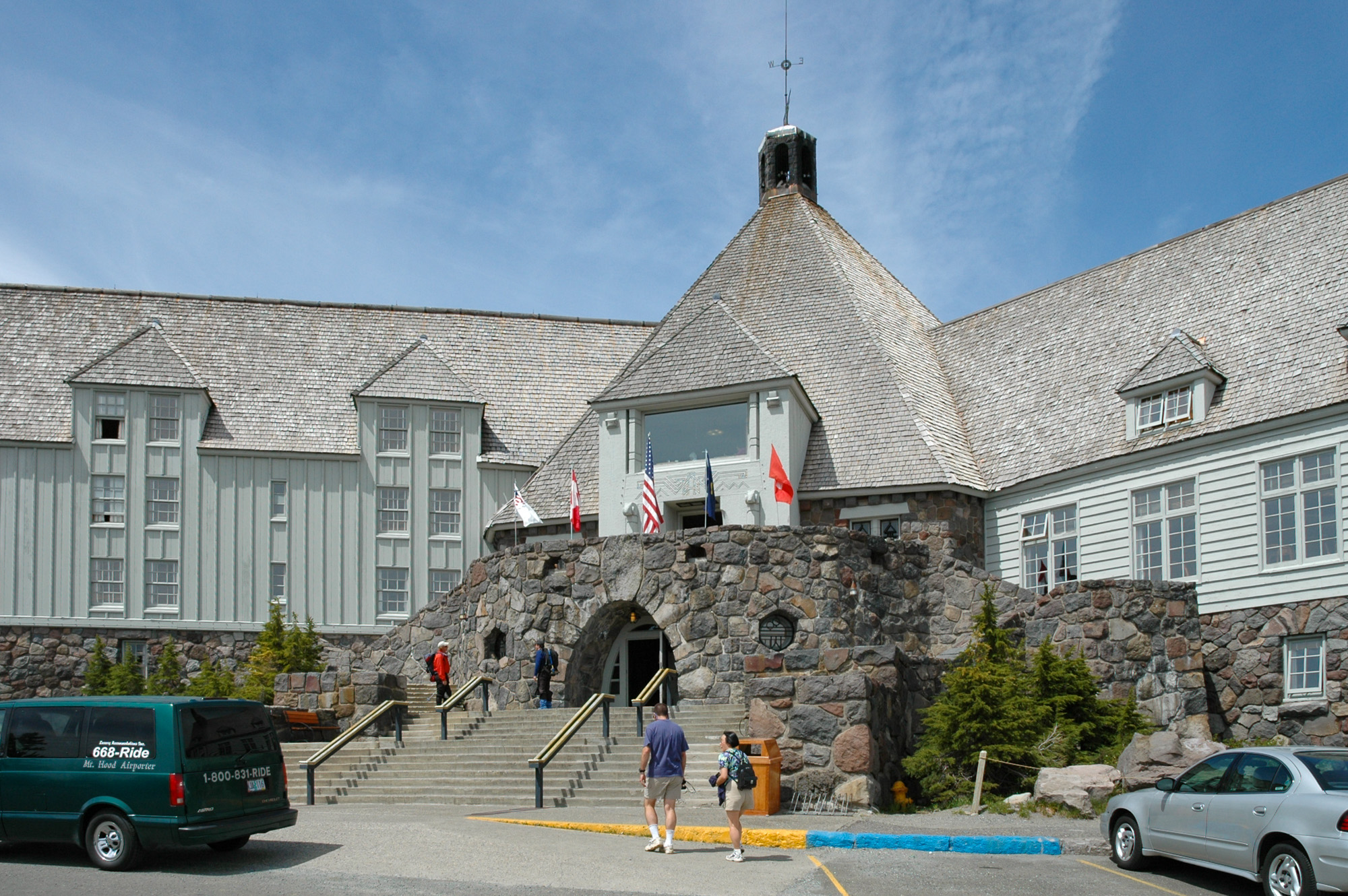
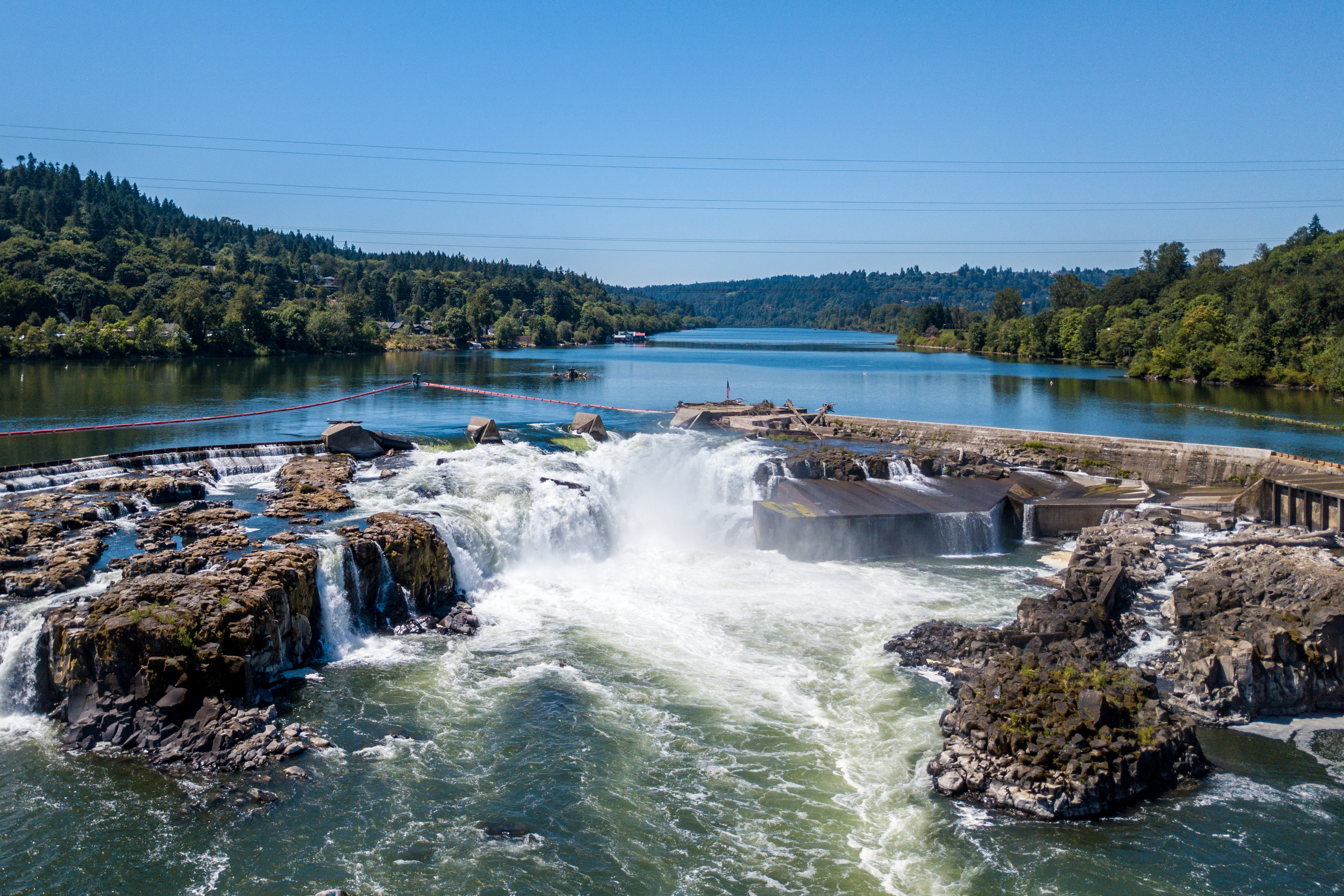
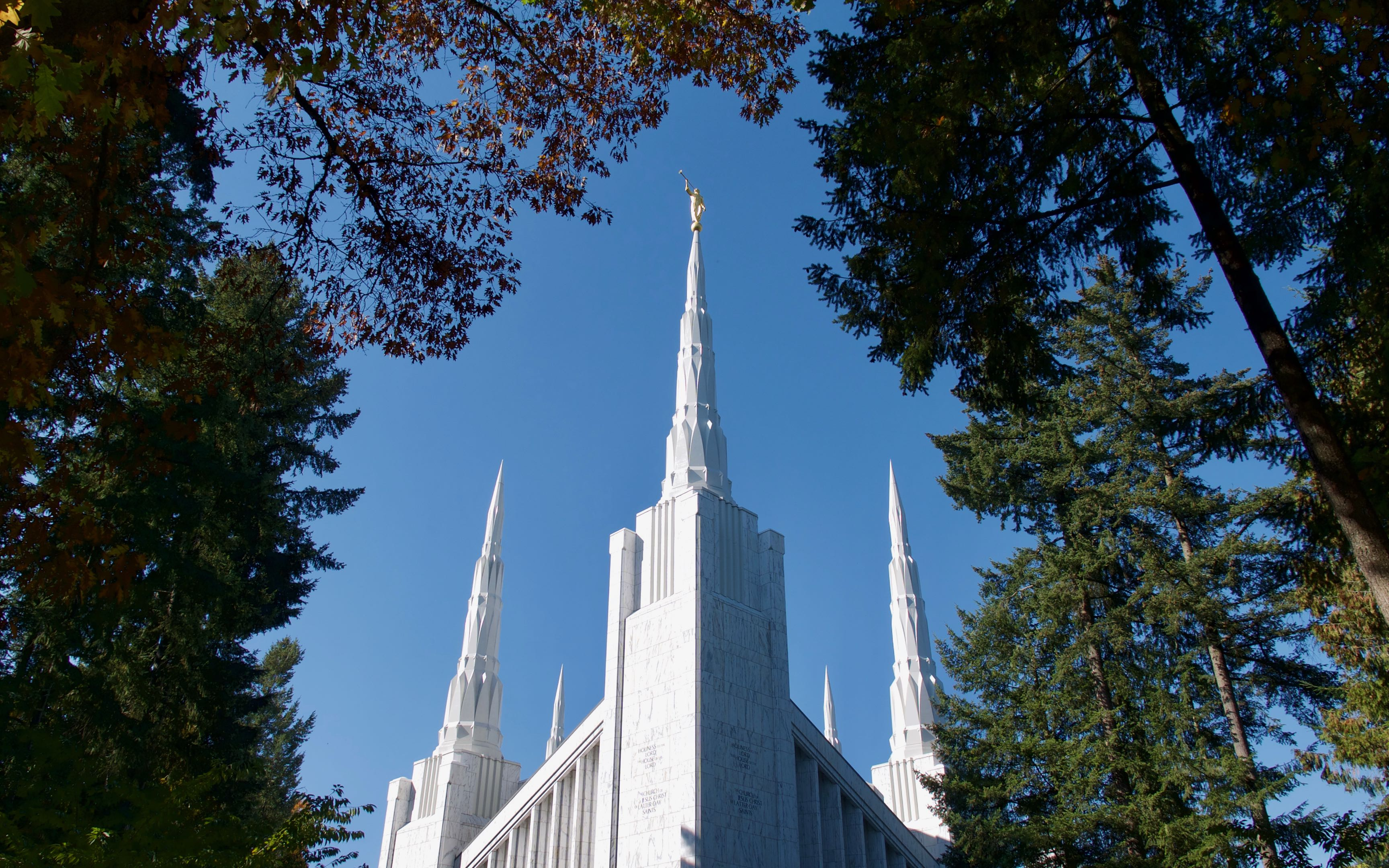
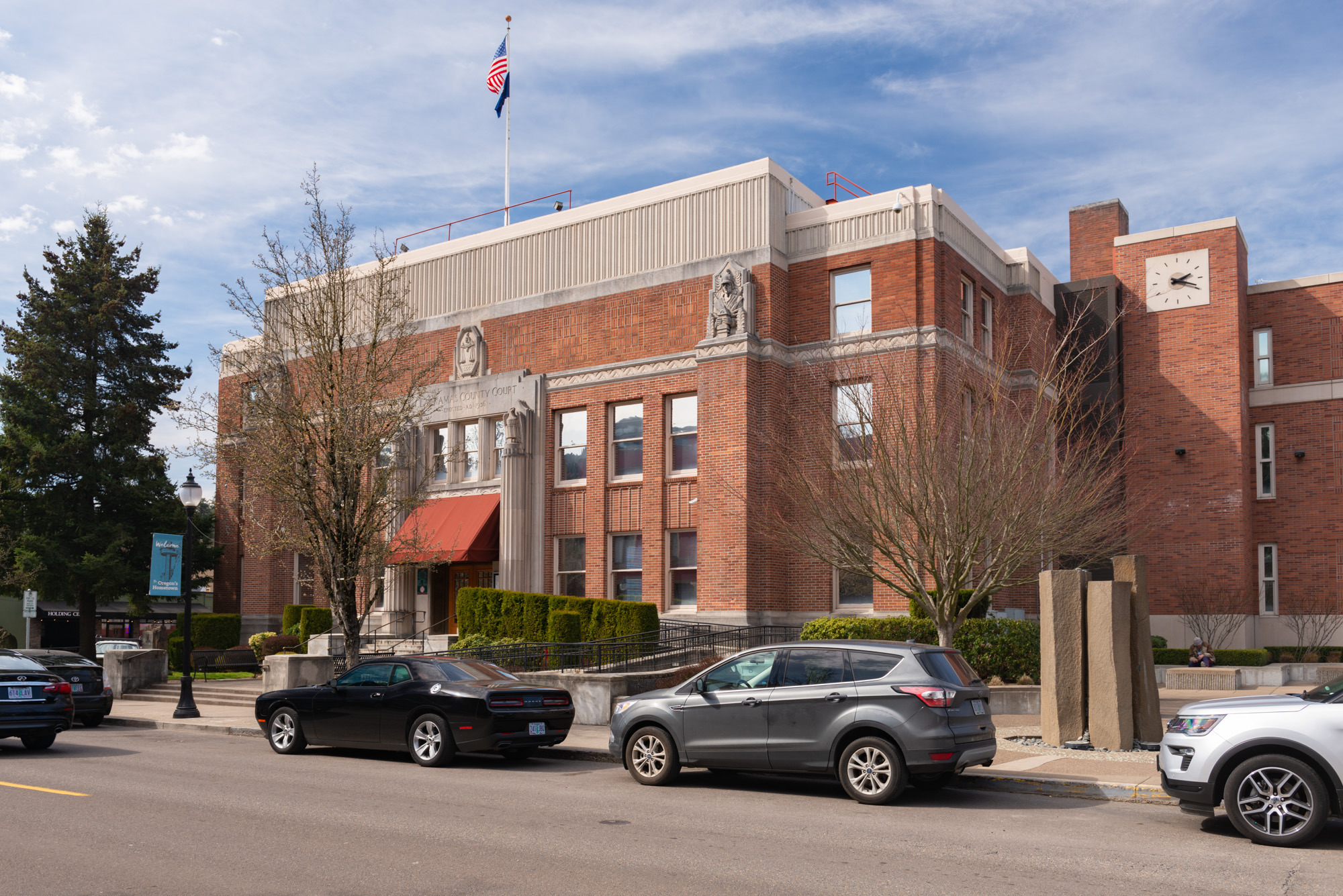
- Mount Hood Oregon City Municipal Elevator Timberline Lodge Willamette Falls Portland Oregon Temple Clackamas County Courthouse

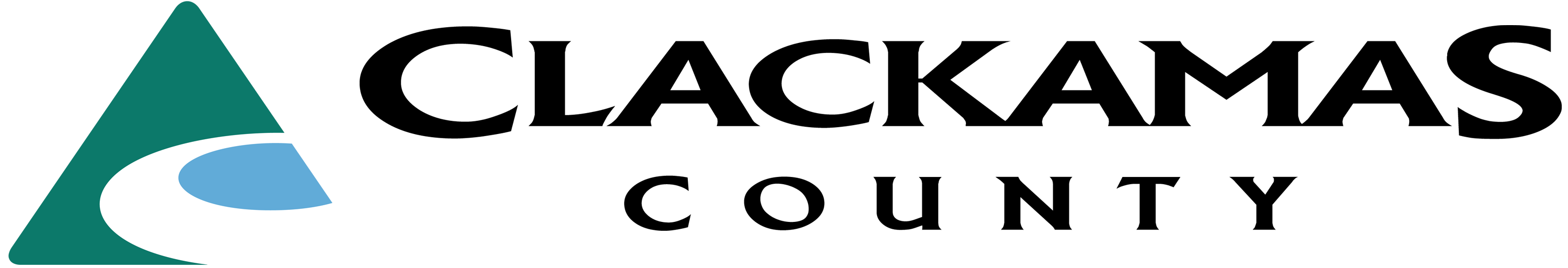
- Seal Logo

- Location within the U.S. state of Oregon
- Coordinates: 45°11′N 122°13′W
- Country: United States
- State: Oregon
- Founded: July 5, 1843
- Named for: Clackamas people
- Seat: Oregon City
- Largest city: Lake Oswego

Area
  - Total: 1,883 sq mi (4,880 km^{2})
  - Land: 1,870 sq mi (4,800 km^{2})
  - Water: 13 sq mi (34 km^{2}) 0.7%

Population (2020)
  - Total: 421,401
  - Estimate (2025): 426,280 ▲
  - Density: 225/sq mi (87.0/km^{2})
- Time zone: UTC−8 (Pacific)
  - Summer (DST): UTC−7 (PDT)
- Congressional districts: 2nd, 3rd, 5th, 6th
- Website: www.clackamas.us

Map of Clackamas County

Clackamas County (/ˈklækəməs/ CLAK-ə-məss) is one of the 36 counties in the U.S. state of Oregon. As of the 2020 census, the population was 421,401, making it Oregon's third-most populous county. Its county seat is Oregon City. The county was named after the native people living in the area at the time of the coming of Europeans, the Clackamas people, who are part of the Chinookan peoples.

Clackamas County is part of the Portland-Vancouver-Hillsboro, OR-WA Metropolitan Statistical Area. It is in the Willamette Valley.

== History ==
Originally named Clackamas District, it was one of the four original Oregon districts created by Oregon's Provisional Legislature on July 5, 1843, along with Twality (later Washington), Champooick (later Marion), and Yamhill. At the time of its creation, Clackamas County covered portions of modern Oregon, Washington, Idaho, Montana, and British Columbia. The Columbia River became the northern boundary of the county in 1844. Soon after, John McLoughlin staked a land claim in Oregon City and built a house that in 2003 became a unit of the Fort Vancouver National Historic Site. The four districts were ultimately redesignated as counties in 1845.

Most of the indigenous people of the Wil-lamet Valley were forcibly removed in February 1859, to the reservation of the Confederated Tribes of Grand Ronde. Most were moved without treaty or compensation for lost lands or resources. Some 22 tribes were moved during the cold winter. It is estimated that 30% did not survive the first year. The tribes eventually prospered, but outside of Clackamas County. They also never received any revenue or compensation from the logging of their homeland forests.

In addition, the Tribes of the Cascades Mountains were isolated to a Reservation after the signing of a treaty in 1859. Confederated Tribes of Warmsprings was established and remains a strong and vital player in actions that concern the Federal forests of the Cascades Range.

Oregon City was also the site of the only federal court west of the Rockies in 1849, when San Francisco, California, was platted. The plat was filed in 1850 in the first plat book of the first office of records on the West Coast and is still in Oregon City.

Around 1900, the spa and resort at Wilthoit Springs was a popular tourist destination. In 1902, the Willamette Meteorite was removed from a field near present-day West Linn.

== Geography ==
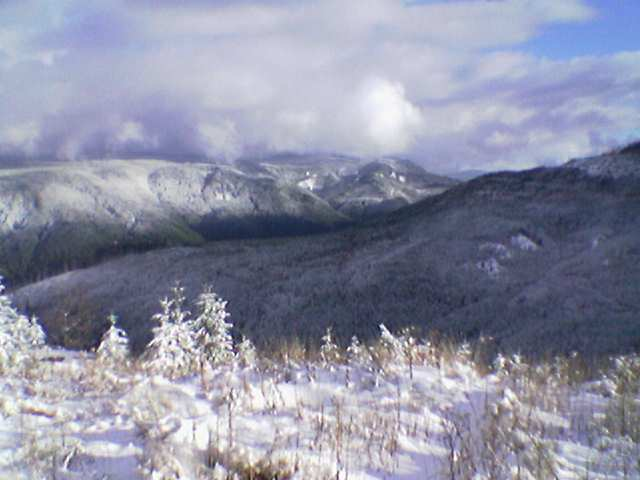
Forest west of Clackamas River Valley

According to the United States Census Bureau, the county has a total area of 1,883 square miles (4,880 km^{2}), of which 1,870 square miles (4,800 km^{2}) is land and 12 square miles (31 km^{2}) (0.7%) is water.

=== Major highways ===
- Interstate 5
- Interstate 205
- U.S. Route 26
- Oregon Route 35
- Oregon Route 43
- Oregon Route 99E
- Oregon Route 211
- Oregon Route 212
- Oregon Route 213
- Oregon Route 224

=== Adjacent counties ===
- Multnomah County - north
- Hood River County - northeast
- Wasco County - east
- Marion County - south
- Yamhill County - west
- Washington County - northwest

The county includes parts of two national forests: Mount Hood National Forest and Willamette National Forest.

== Demographics ==
Historical population
Census	Pop.	Note	%±
1850	1,859		—
1860	3,466		86.4%
1870	5,993		72.9%
1880	9,260		54.5%
1890	15,233		64.5%
1900	19,658		29.0%
1910	29,931		52.3%
1920	37,698		25.9%
1930	46,205		22.6%
1940	57,130		23.6%
1950	86,716		51.8%
1960	113,038		30.4%
1970	166,088		46.9%
1980	241,919		45.7%
1990	278,850		15.3%
2000	338,391		21.4%
2010	375,992		11.1%
2020	421,401		12.1%
2025 (est.)	426,280	▲	1.2%
U.S. Decennial Census; 1790–1960 1900–1990; 1990–2000 2010–2020

=== 2020 census ===
As of the 2020 census, the county had a population of 421,401. Of the residents, 21.5% were under the age of 18 and 19.2% were 65 years of age or older; the median age was 41.7 years. For every 100 females there were 96.9 males, and for every 100 females age 18 and over there were 94.7 males. 82.9% of residents lived in urban areas and 17.1% lived in rural areas.

Detailed counts of the non-Hispanic or Latino racial and ethnic groups from 1980 through 2020 are shown below.

Clackamas County, Oregon – Racial and ethnic composition Note: the US Census treats Hispanic/Latino as an ethnic category. This table excludes Latinos from the racial categories and assigns them to a separate category. Hispanics/Latinos may be of any race.
Race / Ethnicity (NH = Non-Hispanic)	Pop 1980	Pop 1990	Pop 2000	Pop 2010	Pop 2020	% 1980	% 1990	% 2000	% 2010	% 2020
White alone (NH)	233,221	263,965	301,548	317,648	325,361	96.40%	94.66%	89.11%	84.48%	77.21%
Black or African American alone (NH)	757	1,107	2,056	2,761	4,336	0.31%	0.40%	0.61%	0.73%	1.03%
Native American or Alaska Native alone (NH)	1,225	1,824	2,090	2,340	2,249	0.51%	0.65%	0.62%	0.62%	0.53%
Asian alone (NH)	2,376	4,723	8,216	13,575	20,459	0.98%	1.69%	2.43%	3.61%	4.85%
Native Hawaiian or Pacific Islander alone (NH)	x	x	521	815	1,056	x	x	0.15%	0.22%	0.25%
Other race alone (NH)	716	102	317	438	2,158	0.30%	0.04%	0.09%	0.12%	0.51%
Mixed race or Multiracial (NH)	x	x	6,899	9,277	25,440	x	x	2.04%	2.47%	6.04%
Hispanic or Latino (any race)	3,624	7,129	16,744	29,138	40,342	1.50%	2.56%	4.95%	7.75%	9.57%
Total	241,919	278,850	338,391	375,992	421,401	100.00%	100.00%	100.00%	100.00%	100.00%

=== American Community Survey 2025 data ===
The United States Census Bureau estimated that in 2025, Clackamas County’s population was 426.280. It was also estimated that the county's population was 75,21% Non-Hispanic White, 11,13% Hispanic or Latino, 1,47% Non-Hispanic Black, 6,11% Asian, 0,55% Native American, 0,30% Pacific Islander, and 5,23% Multiracial.

Total	Population	Percentage
Non-Hispanic White	320.610	75,21%
Hispanic or Latino	47.456	11,13%
Non-Hispanic Black	6.248	1,47%
Asian	26.053	6,11%
Native American	2.348	0,55%
Pacific Islander	1.276	0,30%
Non-Hispanic Multiracial	22.289	5,23%

The racial makeup of the county was 79.5% White, 1.1% Black or African American, 0.8% American Indian and Alaska Native, 4.9% Asian, 0.3% Native Hawaiian and Pacific Islander, 3.8% from some other race, and 9.6% from two or more races. Hispanic or Latino residents of any race comprised 9.6% of the population.

There were 160,503 households in the county, of which 30.6% had children under the age of 18 living with them and 23.1% had a female householder with no spouse or partner present. About 23.0% of all households were made up of individuals and 11.2% had someone living alone who was 65 years of age or older.

There were 170,094 housing units, of which 5.6% were vacant. Among occupied housing units, 69.7% were owner-occupied and 30.3% were renter-occupied. The homeowner vacancy rate was 1.1% and the rental vacancy rate was 5.5%.

=== 2010 census ===
As of the 2010 census, there were 375,992 people, 145,790 households, and 100,866 families in the county. The population density was 201.0 inhabitants per square mile (77.6/km^{2}). There were 156,945 housing units at an average density of 83.9 per square mile (32.4/km^{2}). The racial makeup of the county was 88.2% white, 3.7% Asian, 0.8% American Indian, 0.8% black or African American, 0.2% Pacific islander, 3.1% from other races, and 3.2% from two or more races. Those of Hispanic or Latino origin made up 7.7% of the population. In terms of ancestry, 24.9% were German, 14.5% were English, 13.3% were Irish, 5.0% were Norwegian, and 4.9% were American.

Of the 145,790 households, 32.8% had children under the age of 18 living with them, 54.8% were married couples living together, 9.8% had a female householder with no husband present, 30.8% were non-families, and 24.1% of all households were made up of individuals. The average household size was 2.56 and the average family size was 3.04. The median age was 40.6 years.

The median income for a household in the county was $62,007 and the median income for a family was $74,905. Males had a median income of $53,488 versus $39,796 for females. The per capita income for the county was $31,785. About 6.1% of families and 9.0% of the population were below the poverty line, including 11.2% of those under age 18 and 6.2% of those age 65 or over.

=== 2000 census ===
As of the 2000 census, there were 338,391 people, 128,201 households, and 91,663 families in the county. The population density was 181 people per square mile (70 people/km^{2}). There were 136,954 housing units at an average density of 73 units per square mile (28/km^{2}). The racial makeup of the county was 91.27% White, 2.45% Asian, 0.71% Native American, 0.66% Black or African American, 0.17% Pacific Islander, 2.28% from other races, and 2.46% from two or more races. 4.95% of the population were Hispanic or Latino of any race. 20.7% were of German, 11.6% English, 9.1% Irish and 7.5% American ancestry.

There were 128,201 households, out of which 34.20% had children under the age of 18 living with them, 58.60% were married couples living together, 9.00% had a female householder with no husband present, and 28.50% were non-families. 22.00% of all households were made up of individuals, and 7.80% had someone living alone who was 65 years of age or older. The average household size was 2.62 and the average family size was 3.07.

The county population contained 26.20% under the age of 18, 8.00% from 18 to 24, 28.70% from 25 to 44, 26.00% from 45 to 64, and 11.10% who were 65 years of age or older. The median age was 38 years. For every 100 females, there were 97.50 males. For every 100 females age 18 and over, there were 94.90 males.

The median income for a household in the county was $52,080, and the median income for a family was $60,791. Males had a median income of $43,462 versus $30,891 for females. The per capita income for the county was $25,973. About 4.60% of families and 6.60% of the population were below the poverty line, including 7.60% of those under age 18 and 5.10% of those age 65 or over.

== Communities ==
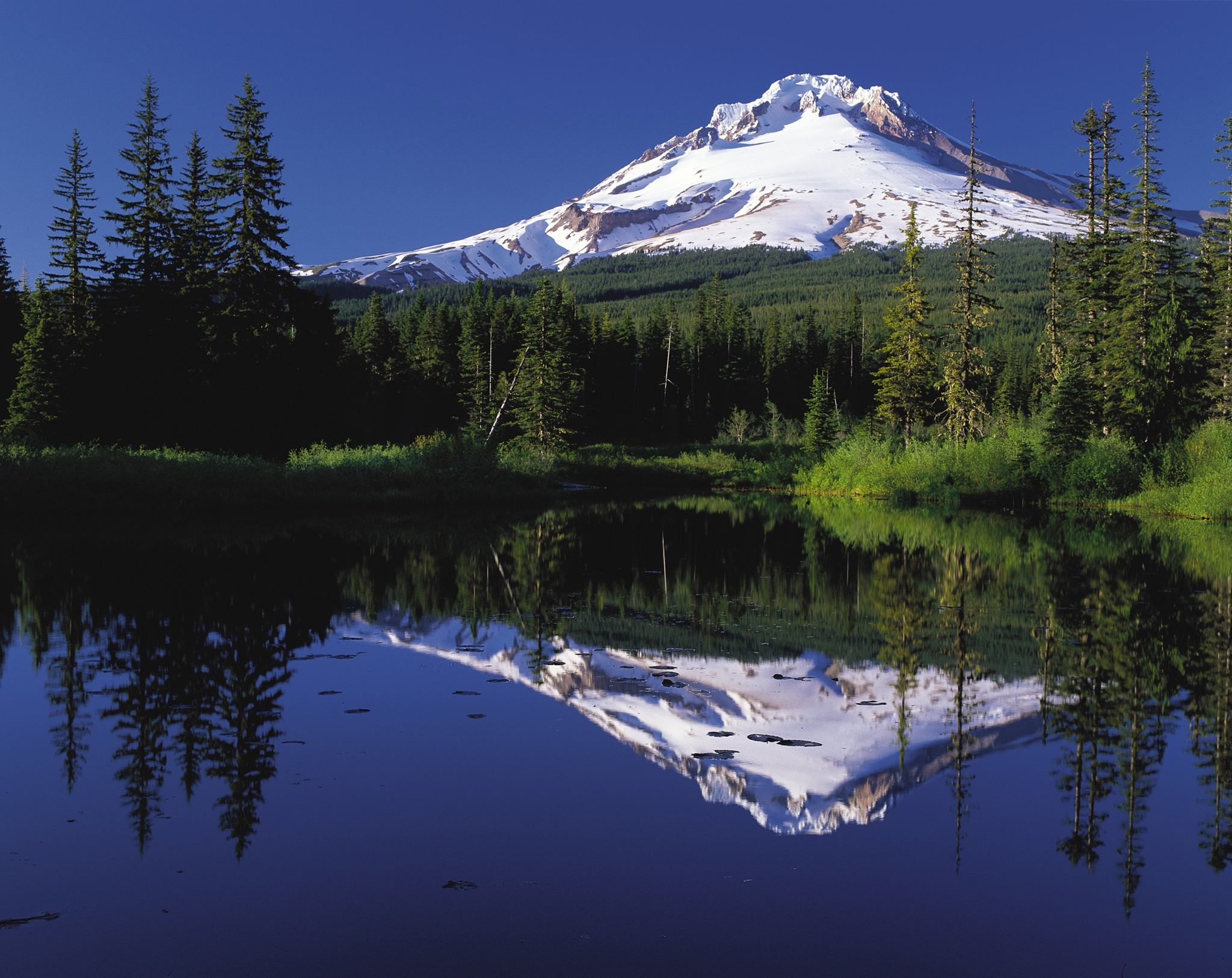
Mount Hood reflected in Trillium Lake

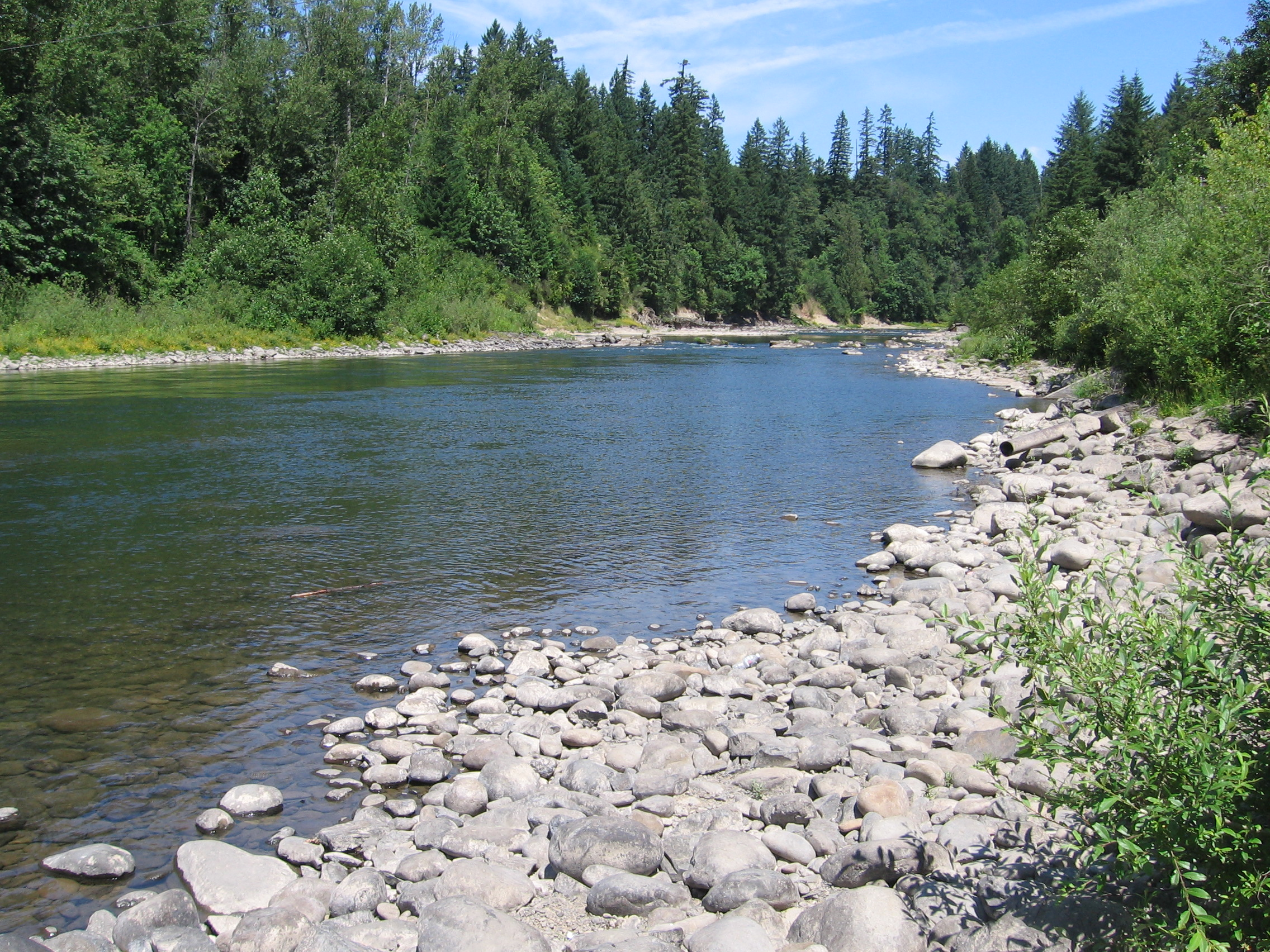
Clackamas River flowing through Milo McIver State Park

Several of the county's cities extend into other counties. Lake Oswego and Milwaukie include areas in Multnomah County. Lake Oswego, Rivergrove and Wilsonville include areas in Washington County. The cities of Portland and Tualatin extend into Clackamas County from Multnomah and Washington counties respectively.

In Clackamas County, hamlets and villages are models of local land use governance for unincorporated areas. The four hamlets in Clackamas County are Beavercreek, Molalla Prairie, Mulino, and Stafford. The county's only village is the Villages at Mount Hood.

=== Cities ===
- Barlow
- Canby
- Damascus (former)
- Estacada
- Gladstone
- Happy Valley
- Johnson City
- Lake Oswego
- Milwaukie
- Molalla
- Oregon City (county seat)
- Portland
- Rivergrove
- Sandy
- Tualatin
- West Linn
- Wilsonville

=== Census-designated places ===
- Beavercreek
- Boring
- Clackamas (former)
- Damascus
- Government Camp
- Jennings Lodge
- Mount Hood Village
- Mulino
- Oak Grove
- Oatfield
- Rhododendron
- Stafford
- Sunnyside (former)

=== Hamlets ===
- Beavercreek
- Molalla Prairie (former)
- Mulino
- Stafford

=== Locales, etc. ===
- Cazadero
- Marylhurst
- Wankers Corner

=== Unincorporated communities ===
- Barton
- Boring
- Brightwood
- Bull Run
- Carus
- Carver
- Cherryville
- Clackamas
- Clarkes
- Colton
- Cottrell
- Eagle Creek
- Faubion
- Government Camp
- Jean
- Jennings Lodge
- Kelso
- Ladd Hill
- Lakewood
- Liberal
- Logan
- Lone Elder
- Macksburg
- Marmot
- Marquam
- Milwaukie Heights
- Mountain Air Park
- Needy
- New Era
- Oak Grove
- Oatfield
- Redland
- Rhododendron
- Ripplebrook
- Riverside
- Shadowood
- Springwater
- Stafford
- Welches
- Wemme
- Wildwood
- Yoder
- Zigzag

=== Former unincorporated communities ===
- Bissell – named for W. S. Bissell, U.S. Postmaster General from 1893 to 1895. Bissell had its own post office from at least 1899 to 1923.

== Government and politics ==
=== Incorporated communities ===
Clackamas County is the first county in Oregon to have four models of governance for its communities. Like the rest of Oregon, it has cities (which are formally incorporated) and rural communities (some of which for federal purposes are considered census-designated places).

After the completion of a process that began in late 1999, the county adopted an ordinance on August 11, 2005, which defined hamlets and villages. By the November 30, 2005, deadline, three communities had submitted petitions to be designated as such. Boring petitioned to become a village, but the application was rejected in a town hall referendum in August 2006. The communities along U.S. Route 26 near Mount Hood from Brightwood to Rhododendron petitioned to become "The Villages at Mount Hood", and it was approved by residents in May 2006. Beavercreek petitioned to become a hamlet, and was recognized as such in September 2006.

=== County commissioners ===
District	Name
Chair	Craig Roberts
Commissioner, Position 2	Paul Savas
Commissioner, Position 3	Martha Schrader
Commissioner, Position 4	Diana Helm (Note: Appointed May 19, 2025 to replace Melissa Fireside, who resigned in March 2025 following criminal charges of forgery and identity theft.)
Commissioner, Position 5	Ben West

=== County officials ===
Office	Name
District Attorney	John Wentworth
County Sheriff	Angela Brandenburg
County Clerk	Catherine McMullen
Justice of the Peace	Karen Brisbin
Assessor Tax Collector	Bronson Rueda
Treasurer	Brian Nava

=== Federal officials ===
Office	Name
U.S. Representative, 3rd District	Maxine Dexter (D)
U.S. Representative, 5th District	Janelle Bynum (D)
U.S. Representative, 6th District	Andrea Salinas (D)
U.S. Senator	Ron Wyden (D)
U.S. Senator	Jeff Merkley (D)

=== State representatives ===
District	Name	Party	Residence
District 18	Rick Lewis	Republican	Silverton
District 26	Sue Rieke Smith	Democratic	King City
District 37	Jules Walters	Democratic	West Linn
District 38	Daniel Nguyen	Democratic	Lake Oswego
District 39	April Dobson	Democratic	Happy Valley
District 40	Annessa Hartman	Democratic	Gladstone
District 41	Mark Gamba	Democratic	Milwaukie
District 48	Hoa Nguyen	Democratic	Portland
District 51	Christine Drazan	Republican	Canby
District 52	Jeff Helfrich	Republican	Hood River

=== State senators ===
District	Name	Party	Residence	Notes
District 9	Fred Girod	Republican	Stayton	
District 13	Courtney Neron Misslin	Democratic	Wilsonville	
District 19	Rob Wagner	Democratic	Lake Oswego	Senate President
District 20	Mark Meek	Democratic	Gladstone	
District 21	Kathleen Taylor	Democratic	Portland	
District 24	Kayse Jama	Democratic	Portland	
District 26	Daniel Bonham	Republican	The Dalles	

United States presidential election results for Clackamas County, Oregon
Year	Republican		Democratic		Third party(ies)	
Year	No.	%	No.	%	No.	%
1880	1,166	57.10%	872	42.70%	4	0.20%
1884	1,381	55.31%	1,015	40.65%	101	4.04%
1888	1,527	56.39%	1,005	37.11%	176	6.50%
1892	1,815	44.51%	655	16.06%	1,608	39.43%
1896	2,664	51.79%	2,386	46.38%	94	1.83%
1900	2,234	53.96%	1,641	39.64%	265	6.40%
1904	2,783	67.78%	684	16.66%	639	15.56%
1908	2,776	53.91%	1,866	36.24%	507	9.85%
1912	1,503	23.01%	2,171	33.24%	2,858	43.75%
1916	6,349	50.91%	5,334	42.77%	788	6.32%
1920	6,928	59.52%	3,740	32.13%	971	8.34%
1924	5,864	43.28%	3,099	22.87%	4,585	33.84%
1928	9,216	59.51%	5,918	38.22%	352	2.27%
1932	5,964	32.05%	11,575	62.20%	1,069	5.74%
1936	5,830	27.37%	14,203	66.67%	1,270	5.96%
1940	11,416	45.39%	13,547	53.86%	190	0.76%
1944	12,492	46.29%	14,060	52.10%	435	1.61%
1948	14,431	47.97%	14,263	47.41%	1,389	4.62%
1952	24,174	59.51%	16,219	39.93%	227	0.56%
1956	25,314	55.36%	20,416	44.64%	0	0.00%
1960	28,531	54.53%	23,679	45.26%	109	0.21%
1964	21,299	37.34%	35,711	62.60%	33	0.06%
1968	32,363	50.60%	27,939	43.68%	3,659	5.72%
1972	41,767	53.49%	32,540	41.67%	3,782	4.84%
1976	47,671	50.74%	42,504	45.24%	3,784	4.03%
1980	54,111	49.42%	40,462	36.96%	14,910	13.62%
1984	68,630	59.08%	47,254	40.68%	289	0.25%
1988	61,381	49.76%	59,799	48.48%	2,171	1.76%
1992	53,724	34.76%	60,310	39.03%	40,504	26.21%
1996	59,443	40.95%	67,709	46.65%	17,994	12.40%
2000	77,539	47.79%	76,421	47.10%	8,302	5.12%
2004	97,691	50.10%	95,129	48.78%	2,180	1.12%
2008	83,595	43.57%	103,476	53.93%	4,807	2.51%
2012	88,592	46.79%	95,493	50.44%	5,247	2.77%
2016	88,392	41.30%	102,095	47.70%	23,552	11.00%
2020	110,509	42.89%	139,043	53.96%	8,127	3.15%
2024	106,387	43.20%	130,580	53.03%	9,273	3.77%

== Economy ==
Since the county's creation, agriculture, timber, manufacturing, and commerce have been the principal economic activities. Mount Hood, the only year-round ski resort in the United States and the site of Timberline Lodge, is a major attraction for recreation and tourism, offering outdoor recreation activities from skiing and rafting to fishing and camping.

== Infrastructure ==
The county supports the Library Information Network of Clackamas County. The urban areas of the county are also served by Metro.

== Education ==
School districts include:

- Canby School District 86
- Centennial School District 28J
- Colton School District 53
- Estacada School District 108
- Gladstone School District 115
- Gresham-Barlow School District 1J
- Lake Oswego School District 7J
- Molalla River School District 35
- Newberg School District 29J
- North Clackamas School District 12
- Oregon City School District 62
- Portland School District 1J
- Riverdale School District 51J
- Oregon Trail School District 46
- Sherwood School District 88J
- Silver Falls School District 4J
- Tigard-Tualatin School District 23J
- West Linn-Wilsonville School District 3J

== Notable people ==
- Bob Amsberry (1928–1957), original member of The Mickey Mouse Club
- Rebecca Anderson (born 1991), beauty pageant titleholder
- Debby Applegate (born 1968), biographer and historian
- Jay Baller (born 1960), baseball player
- Howard C. Belton (1893–1988), Oregon State Treasurer
- William H. Boring (1841–1932), Union soldier; founder of Boring
- Nan Britton (1896–1991), secretary and mistress of President Warren G. Harding
- George Bruns (1914–1984), Walt Disney Pictures film composer
- Ed Coleman (1901–1964), baseball player
- Ralph Coleman (1895–1990), baseball coach
- Ryan Crouser (born 1992), shot putter, discus thrower, Olympic Gold Medalist
- Carson Ellis (born 1975), artist and illustrator
- Philip Foster (1805–1884), pioneer
- Alma Francis (1890–1968), stage actress and singer
- Tom Gorman (born 1957), baseball pitcher
- Tonya Harding (born 1970), Olympic figure skater
- Joni Harms (born 1959), musician
- Bill Johnson (1960–2016), Olympic skier
- Edwin Markham (1852–1940), Poet Laureate of Oregon
- Colin Meloy (born 1974), musician
- Charis Michelsen (born 1974), actress, model, and makeup artist
- Bill Morgan (1910–1985), football player
- Ben Musa (1905–1974), Oregon state legislator
- Alan Olsen (born 1948), Oregon State Senator
- Ralph Patt (1929–2010), jazz-guitarist who invented major-thirds tuning; geological expert on groundwater contamination from the Hanford Site.
- Burt Rutan (born 1943), aerospace engineer
- Kurt Schrader (born 1951), U.S. Representative from Oregon
- Martha Schrader (born 1953), Oregon State Senator
- Chael Sonnen (born 1977), wrestler
- Brenda Strong (born 1960), film and television actress
- Maria Thayer (born 1975), actress and comedian
- Mark Thorson (born 1983), football player
- Aaron E. Waite (1813–1898), Oregon Supreme Court justice
- Brian Wilbur (born 1986), Granada Lions quarterback

== See also ==
- National Register of Historic Places listings in Clackamas County, Oregon
- Wilthoit Springs, county park and historic site
