= Area codes 503 and 971 =

Area codes in northwestern Oregon, United States

Coordinates: 45.5°N 123°W

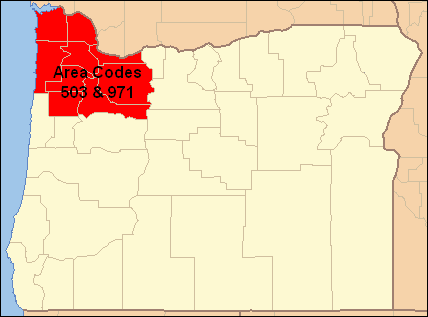

Area codes 503 and 971 are telephone area codes in the North American Numbering Plan (NANP) for the northwestern region of the U.S. state of Oregon. The numbering plan area (NPA) comprises the cities of Portland, Salem, and Astoria. Area code 503 was one of the original North American area codes of 1947, assigned to the entire state until 1995, when its extent was reduced to the northwestern corner. Area code 971 was assigned to the service area in stages, completed in 2008, to form an overlay complex in the area with ten-digit dialing.

== History ==
In the initial configuration of the nationwide telephone numbering plan designed by AT&T in 1947, the state of Oregon was assigned a single area code, 503. Despite Oregon's growth in the second half of the twentieth century, particularly in the Willamette Valley (Portland and Eugene), this remained so for 48 years, making Oregon one of the largest states by area with a single area code. By the early 1990s, it was apparent that the state would need a second area code due to the proliferation of cell phones and pagers, particularly in the Portland area.

On November 5, 1995, the numbering plan area was reduced to the more densely populated northwestern corner of the state, including Portland. The rest of the state, essentially everything south and east of Portland, received the new area code 541.

Although this was intended as a long-term solution, the Portland area remained home to the great majority of Oregon's landlines, as well as most of its cell phones and pagers, the area continued to experience a shortage in telephone numbers. Within three years, 503 was already threatened with exhaustion again, requiring further relief. On July 1, 1999, area code 971 was created as a concentrated overlay for most of the numbering plan area, with the exceptions of Clatsop and Tillamook counties. Initially, ten-digit dialing was to become mandatory across northwest Oregon on January 30, 2000, but the date was extended until October 1, 2000.

The previously exempted Clatsop and Tillamook counties were added to the overlay on April 27, 2008.

== Service area ==
The service area includes the following counties:

- Clackamas County
- Clatsop County
- Columbia County
- Linn County (far northern parts, including Scio, Lyons, and Mill City)
- Marion County (except southernmost parts around Jefferson)
- Multnomah County
- Polk County
- Tillamook County
- Washington County
- Yamhill County

== See also ==
- List of North American Numbering Plan area codes
- List of Oregon area codes

Oregon area codes: 503/971, 541/458
	North: 360/564	
West: Pacific Ocean	503/971	East: 458/541
	South: 458/541	
Washington area codes: 206, 253, 360, 425, 509, 564
