= Yocum Falls (Clackamas County, Oregon) =

- Interactive map of Yocum Falls
- Location: Salmon–Huckleberry Wilderness
- Coordinates: 45.30694°N 121.79306°W
- Type: Cascade
- Elevation: 3,355 ft (1,023 m)
- Total height: not cataloged

Yocum Falls, is a waterfall located in the heart of the Mount Hood National Forest, in Clackamas County, in the U.S. state of Oregon. It is located in a privileged area in Zigzag canyon with several waterfalls including Little Zigzag Falls and Ramona Falls. The name, as well as Yocum Ridge, the south ridge of the Sandy Glacier on the west slope of Mount Hood, comes from businessman Oliver C. Yocum.

== Location ==
Yocum Falls about 10 miles from the town of Government Camp on U.S. Route 26 as it goes through Mount Hood National Forest. It sits in a new space of protected land on the north skirt of the Tom Dick and Harry Mountain.

== History ==
Yocum Falls is surrounded by a forest that has grown the last 100 years to cover the consequences of the Sherar Burn, a massive fire that destroyed forests from the Salmon River to Camp Creek. The fields of beargrass and huckleberry characteristic of the 1920s are now filled with trees up to Mirror lake. In the early 1930s, a new trail to Mirror Lake was constructed from the newly built Route 26.

== Description ==
Yocum Falls is composed by a series of consecutive cascades. The upper tier and its lower drop, that spreads 25–35 feet over a ledge along Camp Creek are accessible, whereas the middle section is crowded by matured timber and difficult to access. The surrounding hills of Tom Dick and Harry Mountain are of Pleistocene or Pliocene origin with andesite originating from moderately porphyritic pyroxene lava flows. Further towards Mirror Lake the andesite is basaltic from lava flows of the north side of the Tom Dick and Harry Mountain.

== Access ==
Hiking to Yocum Falls starts at the historic Laurel Hill monument on the Barlow Road of the Oregon Trail. The trail is approximately 1.6 mi (2.6 km) long round trip and requires skill, visitors should always follow rules of safe waterfall hiking when visiting Yocum Falls. Approximately halfway up, the trail crosses with the Pacific Crest Trail. A little over a mile south is Mirror Lake and the trail that leads to the lake starts at the point where Route 26 allows access to Yocum Falls. Approximately 2 miles further south, the trail reaches the summit of Tom Dick and Harry Mountain.

== See also ==
- List of waterfalls in Oregon
