= Olney =

Olney may refer to:

== Places ==
=== Australia ===
- Parish of Olney (King County), New South Wales

=== England ===
- Olney, Buckinghamshire, a town and civil parish in the City of Milton Keynes district, Buckinghamshire

=== United States ===
- Olney, Alabama
- Olney, Georgia - see List of places in Georgia (U.S. state) (I–R)
- Olney, Illinois
- Olney Township, Richland County, Illinois
- Olney, Maryland
  - Olney Theatre Center
- Olney (Joppa, Maryland), a home on the National Register of Historic Places
- Olney Township, Nobles County, Minnesota
- Olney, Missouri
- Olney, Montana
- Olney, Oklahoma
- Olney, Oregon
- Olney, Philadelphia, Pennsylvania, a neighborhood
- Olney, Texas

== Schools ==
- Olney Friends School, Barnesville, Ohio
- Olney High School, Philadelphia, Pennsylvania

== Other uses ==
- Olney (surname)
- Olney station (disambiguation), stations of the name
- Olney Formation, in the Murray Basin, Australia

== See also ==
- Olney Hymns, a collection of hymns written in Olney, Buckinghamshire, England
- Onley (disambiguation)
- Olneyville, Providence, Rhode Island, a neighborhood
- Justice Olney (disambiguation)
