= Olney (surname) =

Olney is a surname. Notable people with the surname include:

- Buster Olney (born 1964), baseball commentator
- Cyrus Olney (1815–1870), American politician and judge
- David Olney (1948–2020), American singer and songwriter
- Frank F. Olney (1851–1903) 18th mayor of Providence, Rhode Island 1894-1896
- Frederick C. Olney (1862–1918), African-American lawyer with Native American ancestry
- Howard Olney (1934–2025), Australian jurist and Aboriginal Lands Commissioner
- Ian Olney (born 1969), English association footballer
- Jeremiah Olney (1749–1812), Continental Army soldier and older brother of Stephen Olney
- Jesse Olney (1798–1872), American geographer
- John Olney (1932–2015), physician, medical scientist and critic of food additives
- Martha Olney (born 1956), economics professor and textbook author
- Peter B. Olney (1843–1922), New York County District Attorney 1883–1884
- Richard Olney (1835–1917), United States Attorney General and Secretary of State
- Richard Olney II (1871–1939), Congressman from Massachusetts
- Richard Olney (food writer) (1927–1999), American writer
- Sarah Olney (born 1977), British Liberal Democrat politician and an accountant
- Stephen Olney (1755–1832), Continental Army soldier and Rhode Island legislator
- Violet Olney (1911–1999), British athlete
- Warren Olney (1841–1921), co-founder of the Sierra Club, mayor of Oakland, California
- Warren Olney Jr. (1870–1939), justice of the California Supreme Court
- Warren Olney IV (born 1938), broadcast journalist in Los Angeles, California
- Will Olney (born 1980), economics professor
