= Philip Foster Farm =

Historic house in Oregon, United States

- U.S. National Register of Historic Places
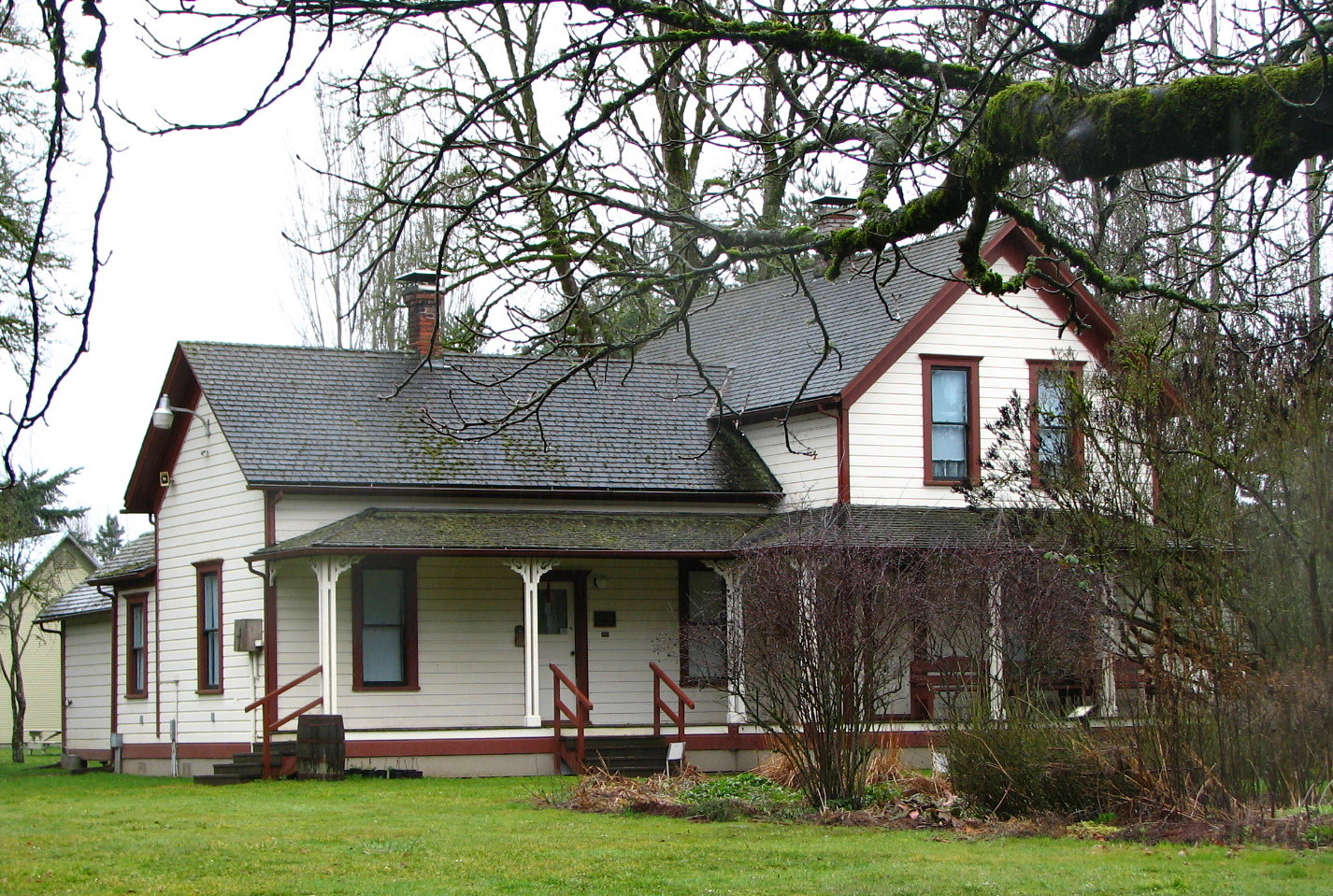
- Location: 22725 SE Eagle Creek Road, Eagle Creek, Oregon, United States
- Nearest city: Estacada, Oregon
- Coordinates: 45.358765°N 122.353449°W
- Area: 2 acres (0.81 ha)
- Built: 1843
- NRHP reference No.: 80003305
- Added to NRHP: August 15, 1980

Philip Foster Farm is a historic site in Eagle Creek, Oregon, United States, near the city of Estacada. The farm is part of a 640-acre (260 ha) land claim purchased in 1847 by American pioneer Philip Foster. Foster built a store, house, barn, and other structures at the farm. The farmhouse and barn still stand, and replicas of the store, blacksmith shop and log cabin have been built on the site.

The farm is located on the last leg of the Barlow Road, and was an important rest stop for travelers on the Oregon Trail.

Exteriors of the farm are accessible year-round, with interpretive signage. The farm's website lists visiting hours to see the interiors, with costumed interpreters. The site was listed on the National Register of Historic Places in 1980, and hosts thousands of school children each year for their hands-on Pioneer Life field trips. The society which owns and operates the site jokes that Foster Farm is the "first destination resort in the Oregon Territory."

The Philip Foster Farm is owned and managed by the Jacknife Zion Horse Heaven Historical Society. The society's board of directors manage policy, while paid staff and volunteers manage events.

Events include Pioneer Life tours (over 6000 participants), general public tours (over 2000), Live History Camp (5000), special events (13,000), and Trails Across Time (11,000). Special events include Mary Charlotte's Garden Party, the fall cider squeeze, and Christmas in the Country.
