= Philip Foster =

American politician (1805–1884)

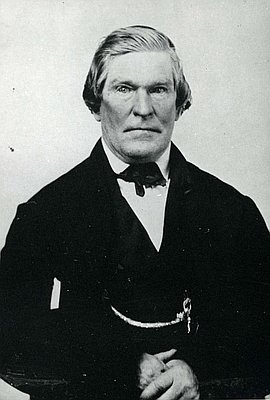

Treasurer for the Provisional Government of Oregon
- In office 1844–1845
- Preceded by: William H. Willson
- Succeeded by: Francis Ermatinger
- Constituency: Oregon Country

Personal details
- Born: January 29, 1805 Argyle, Maine, U.S.
- Died: March 17, 1884 (aged 79) Eagle Creek, Oregon, U.S.
- Spouse: Mary Charlotte Pettygrove
- Relations: Francis Pettygrove (brother-in-law)
- Children: Lucy Foster, Egbert Foster

Philip Foster (January 29, 1805 – March 17, 1884) an American politician. He was one of the first white settlers in Oregon, United States. He became the treasurer for the Provisional Government of Oregon. The farmstead he established in Eagle Creek in 1847 became a stopping post for pioneers heading west along the Oregon Trail. Approximately 10,000 emigrants are believed to have passed through. The farm was listed on the National Register of Historic Places in 1980.

== Early life ==
Foster was a successful businessman from Argyle, Maine. In the early 19th century he, like many others, headed west, recognizing the prospects of business in the Oregon Country. In 1842, the Fosters and Francis William Pettygrove's family (Foster's wife, Mary Charlotte, was Pettygrove's sister) sailed from New York for Oregon on the ship Victoria, an A.G. & A.W. Benson vessel via the Sandwich Islands (Hawaii). They were delayed on the Sandwich Islands for six months before heading on to the Willamette Valley, arriving in Oregon City in 1843.

== Oregon ==
In Oregon City on the Willamette River Foster and Pettygrove established a general store. The two-story building served both as a store and a home for the Foster family. Foster subsequently formed many partnerships, including establishing a flour mill with Dr. John McLoughlin. In 1844, Foster became the second treasurer of the provisional government in the Oregon Country.

In 1845, Sam Barlow was unwilling to pay the Hudson's Bay Company bateaux to float down the dangerous Columbia River, so he, his family, and the rest of their wagon train searched for another route around Mount Hood. Joined by subsequent wagon trains, Barlow, Joel Palmer and emigrant Lock scouted for routes around the mountain. Palmer spotted possible passage from the heights of Mount Hood. Barlow with fellow traveler William H. Rector set out to blaze a trail, but they became lost on the mountain. After being rescued by local Indians and cattle drovers, Barlow met Foster at his Oregon City store where Barlow bought provisions and hired oxen to rescue his snowbound party.

Foster became Barlow's business partner in building the Mount Hood Toll Road (now known as the Barlow Road) in 1846, which became the last leg of the overland Oregon Trail to Oregon City. Philip Foster moved his family from Oregon City and settled along the toll road, where he had a store, cabins for rent, orchards, gardens, and pastures for grazing stock. The Fosters received thousands of wagons and guests. At the sometimes overcrowded rest stop known as "Foster's Place" or "Foster's Ranch," some travelers paid to sleep on the family's parlor floor. The family also provided home-cooked meals for the emigrants. Charging whatever they could, the Fosters thrived. Foster also established various facilities at his residence including blacksmith services, a designated cabin for housing overnight customers, as well as a thriving general store. Philip Foster Farm has been preserved and is now open to visitors. It is listed on the National Register of Historic Places.

Philip Foster died Monday, March 17, 1884, of a heart attack at his home in Eagle Creek in the doorway of the kitchen, the Philip Foster Farm. Mary Charlotte died in 1880 of typhoid fever.
