= Only =

Only or The Only may refer to:

== Music ==
=== Albums ===
- Only (album), by Tommy Emmanuel, 2000
- The Only, an EP by Dua Lipa, 2017
- The Only (EP), by The Boyz

=== Songs ===
- "Only" (Anthrax song), 1993
- "Only" (Nine Inch Nails song), 2005
- "Only" (Nicki Minaj song), 2014
- "Only" (Lee Hi song), 2021
- "The Only", by Static-X, 2003
- "Only", by Ass Ponys from Lohio, 2001
- "Only", by Fuse ODG, 2015
- "Only", by Imagine Dragons from Origins, 2018
- "Only", by NF from The Search, 2019
- "Only", by Sarah Vaughan from Sarah Slightly Classical, 1963
- "Only", by Sampha from Lahai, 2023
- "The Only", a song by Raiden featuring Irene, 2019
- "The Only", by Sasha Alex Sloan from Loser, 2018

== Other uses ==
- Only (film), a 2019 post-apocalyptic romance film
- Only (magazine), a 2000s Canadian news and entertainment magazine
- Only, Tennessee, US
- Jerry Only (born 1959), American punk rock bassist and singer
- The Only Nolan (1857–1913), Canadian baseball player

== See also ==
- Onli, people with this surname
- Onley (disambiguation)
