= Barlow, Oregon =

- City
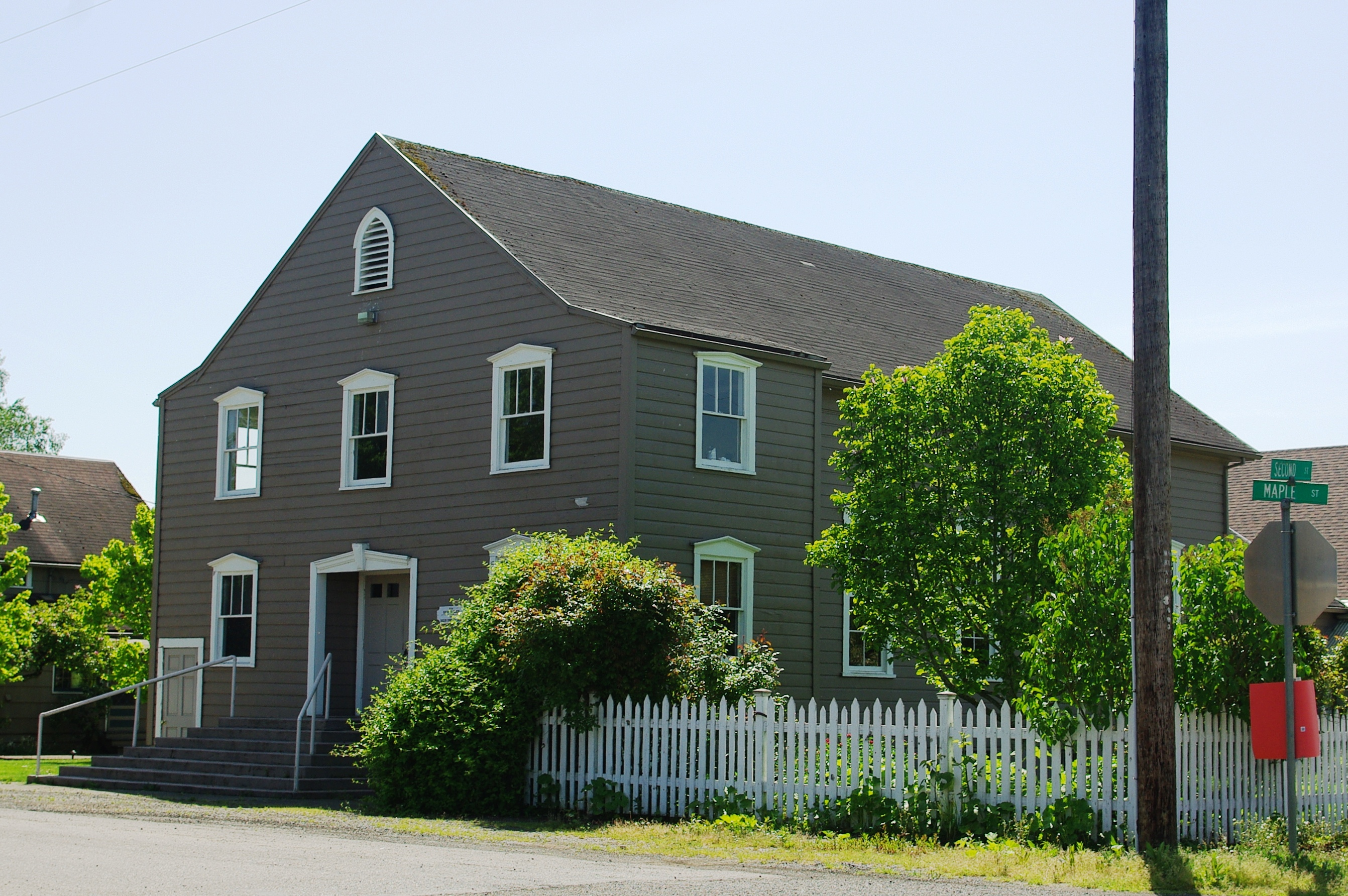
- Church in Barlow

- Location in Oregon
- Coordinates: 45°15′08″N 122°43′21″W
- Country: United States
- State: Oregon
- County: Clackamas
- Incorporated: 1903

Government
  - Mayor: Michael Lundsten

Area
  - Total: 0.054 sq mi (0.14 km^{2})
  - Land: 0.054 sq mi (0.14 km^{2})
  - Water: 0 sq mi (0.00 km^{2})
- Elevation: 102 ft (31 m)

Population (2020)
  - Total: 133
  - Density: 2,551.6/sq mi (985.18/km^{2})
- Time zone: UTC-8 (Pacific)
  - Summer (DST): UTC-7 (Pacific)
- ZIP code: 97013
- Area code: 503
- FIPS code: 41-04000
- GNIS feature ID: 2409787
- Website: www.barloworegon.com

Barlow is a city in Clackamas County, Oregon, United States. The population was 133 at the 2020 census. The mayor of Barlow is Robert Lang Larson.

== History ==
Barlow is named for William Barlow, the son of Samuel K. Barlow (developer of the Barlow Road). Samuel bought the donation land claim in which Barlow is located from Thomas McKay on September 17, 1850. He later sold the land to William.

In 1870, the railroad was built through Barlow. The station was originally named Barlows (for William, not Samuel). As of 2003, the main line of the Union Pacific Railroad still ran through Barlow.

The post office at Barlow was opened on February 7, 1871. It closed on January 3, 1975.

== Geography ==
According to the United States Census Bureau, the city has a total area of 0.05 square miles (0.13 km^{2}), all of it land.

== Demographics ==
Historical population
Census	Pop.	Note	%±
1910	69		—
1920	42		−39.1%
1930	40		−4.8%
1940	52		30.0%
1950	75		44.2%
1960	85		13.3%
1970	105		23.5%
1980	105		0.0%
1990	118		12.4%
2000	140		18.6%
2010	135		−3.6%
2020	133		−1.5%
U.S. Decennial Census

=== 2020 census ===
As of the 2020 census, Barlow had a population of 133. The median age was 42.5 years. 29.3% of residents were under the age of 18 and 14.3% of residents were 65 years of age or older. For every 100 females there were 107.8 males, and for every 100 females age 18 and over there were 104.3 males age 18 and over.

100.0% of residents lived in urban areas, while 0% lived in rural areas.

There were 42 households in Barlow, of which 47.6% had children under the age of 18 living in them. Of all households, 69.0% were married-couple households, 7.1% were households with a male householder and no spouse or partner present, and 14.3% were households with a female householder and no spouse or partner present. About 2.4% of all households were made up of individuals and 2.4% had someone living alone who was 65 years of age or older.

There were 42 housing units, of which 0% were vacant. Among occupied housing units, 92.9% were owner-occupied and 7.1% were renter-occupied. The homeowner vacancy rate was <0.1% and the rental vacancy rate was <0.1%.

Racial composition as of the 2020 census
Race	Number	Percent
White	105	78.9%
Black or African American	0	0%
American Indian and Alaska Native	3	2.3%
Asian	0	0%
Native Hawaiian and Other Pacific Islander	0	0%
Some other race	16	12.0%
Two or more races	9	6.8%
Hispanic or Latino (of any race)	29	21.8%

=== 2010 census ===
As of the census of 2010, there were 135 people, 44 households, and 35 families living in the city. The population density was 2,700.0 inhabitants per square mile (1,042.5/km^{2}). There were 45 housing units at an average density of 900.0 per square mile (347.5/km^{2}). The racial makeup of the city was 80.7% White, 0.7% African American, 0.7% Native American, 14.1% from other races, and 3.7% from two or more races. Hispanic or Latino of any race were 14.8% of the population.

There were 44 households, of which 36.4% had children under the age of 18 living with them, 61.4% were married couples living together, 11.4% had a female householder with no husband present, 6.8% had a male householder with no wife present, and 20.5% were non-families. 20.5% of all households were made up of individuals, and 11.4% had someone living alone who was 65 years of age or older. The average household size was 3.07 and the average family size was 3.43.

The median age in the city was 38.4 years. 29.6% of residents were under the age of 18; 8.1% were between the ages of 18 and 24; 23% were from 25 to 44; 26.7% were from 45 to 64; and 12.6% were 65 years of age or older. The gender makeup of the city was 48.9% male and 51.1% female.

=== 2000 census ===
As of the census of 2000, there were 140 people, 40 households, and 33 families living in the city. The population density was 2,275.8 inhabitants per square mile (878.7/km^{2}). There were 41 housing units at an average density of 666.5 per square mile (257.3/km^{2}). The racial makeup of the city was 90.71% White, 0.71% Asian, 3.57% from other races, and 5.00% from two or more races. Hispanic or Latino of any race were 9.29% of the population.

There were 40 households, out of which 47.5% had children under the age of 18 living with them, 77.5% were married couples living together, 5.0% had a female householder with no husband present, and 17.5% were non-families. 12.5% of all households were made up of individuals, and 7.5% had someone living alone who was 65 years of age or older. The average household size was 3.50 and the average family size was 3.79.

In the city, the population was spread out, with 32.9% under the age of 18, 8.6% from 18 to 24, 28.6% from 25 to 44, 19.3% from 45 to 64, and 10.7% who were 65 years of age or older. The median age was 34 years. For every 100 females, there were 97.2 males. For every 100 females age 18 and over, there were 104.3 males.

The median income for a household in the city was $41,250, and the median income for a family was $46,250. Males had a median income of $35,156 versus $37,917 for females. The per capita income for the city was $14,431. There were 5.4% of families and 3.5% of the population living below the poverty line, including 7.9% of under eighteens and none of those over 64.

== See also ==
- William Barlow House
