= William Barlow (pioneer) =

American pioneer and founder of Barlow, Oregon

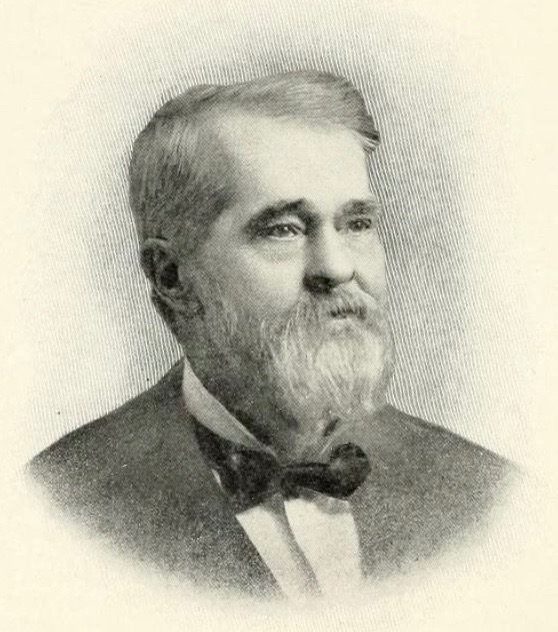
William Barlow

William Barlow (October 26, 1822 – June 18, 1904) was an early Oregon pioneer and founder of Barlow, Oregon, United States.

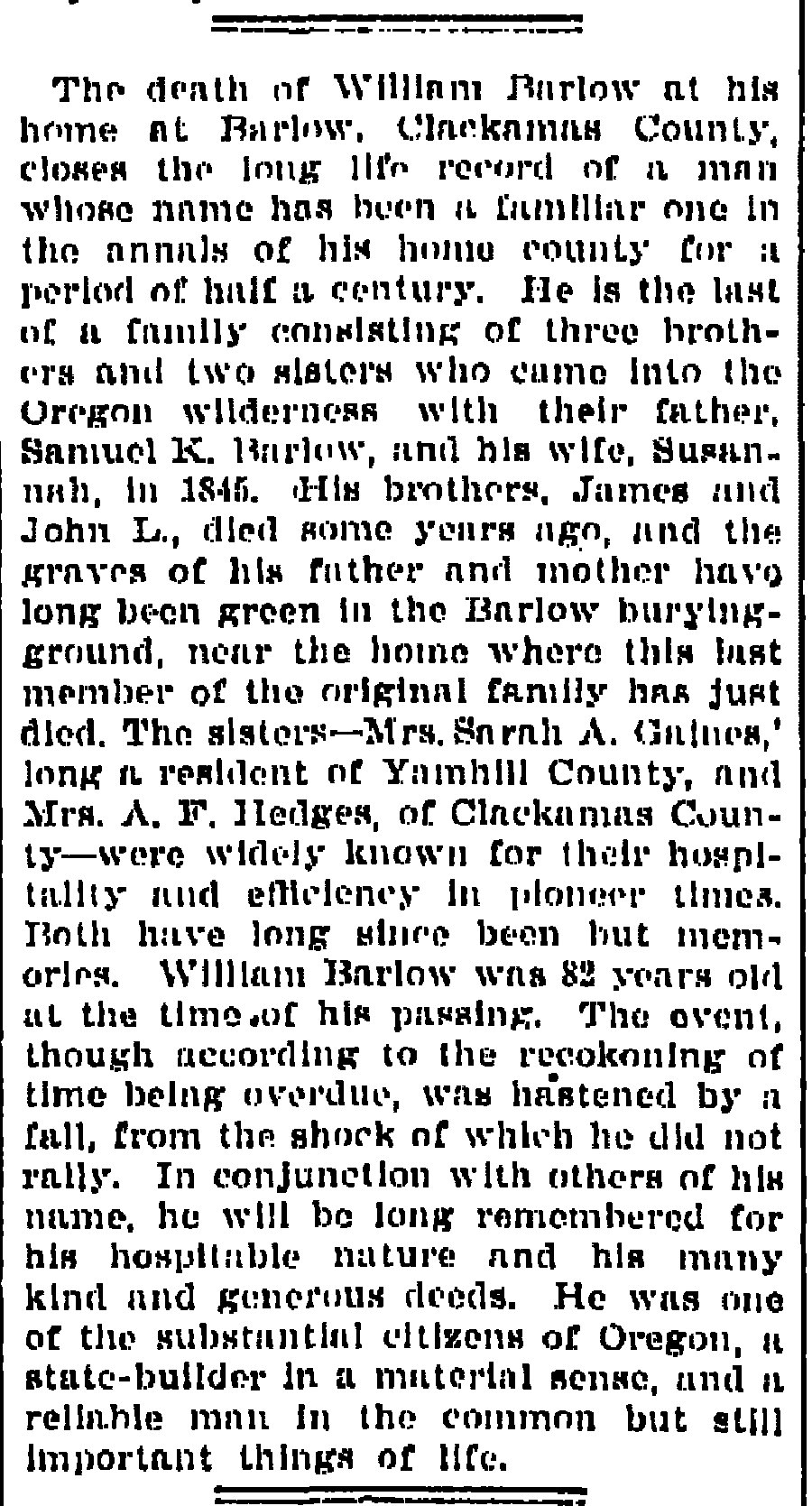
Obituary from the Oregonian, 1904

Barlow arrived in Oregon as a young man in 1845. He purchased land and founded the town of Canemah, now part of Oregon City, Oregon. When William and his brother James were tending the toll gate on the Barlow Road in 1847, they met their brides-to-be, Rachel and Rebecca Larkins, the young daughters of William E. Larkins and his wife, Rachel Reed. On August 20, 1848, William married Rachel. She died a month later.

In 1852 he married widow Mrs. Martha Ann Allen; they had three children: Mary, Virginia and Cassius.

Sometime after 1848, Barlow purchased a 640-acre (260 ha) land claim from his father Sam Barlow for $6,000 (equivalent to $218,054 in 2024). In 1891, he founded the town of Barlow on that land. His residence, now known as the Barlow House, still stands near Barlow.

== See also ==
- Barlow Road
