= Charles L. Hodges =

U.S. Army major general

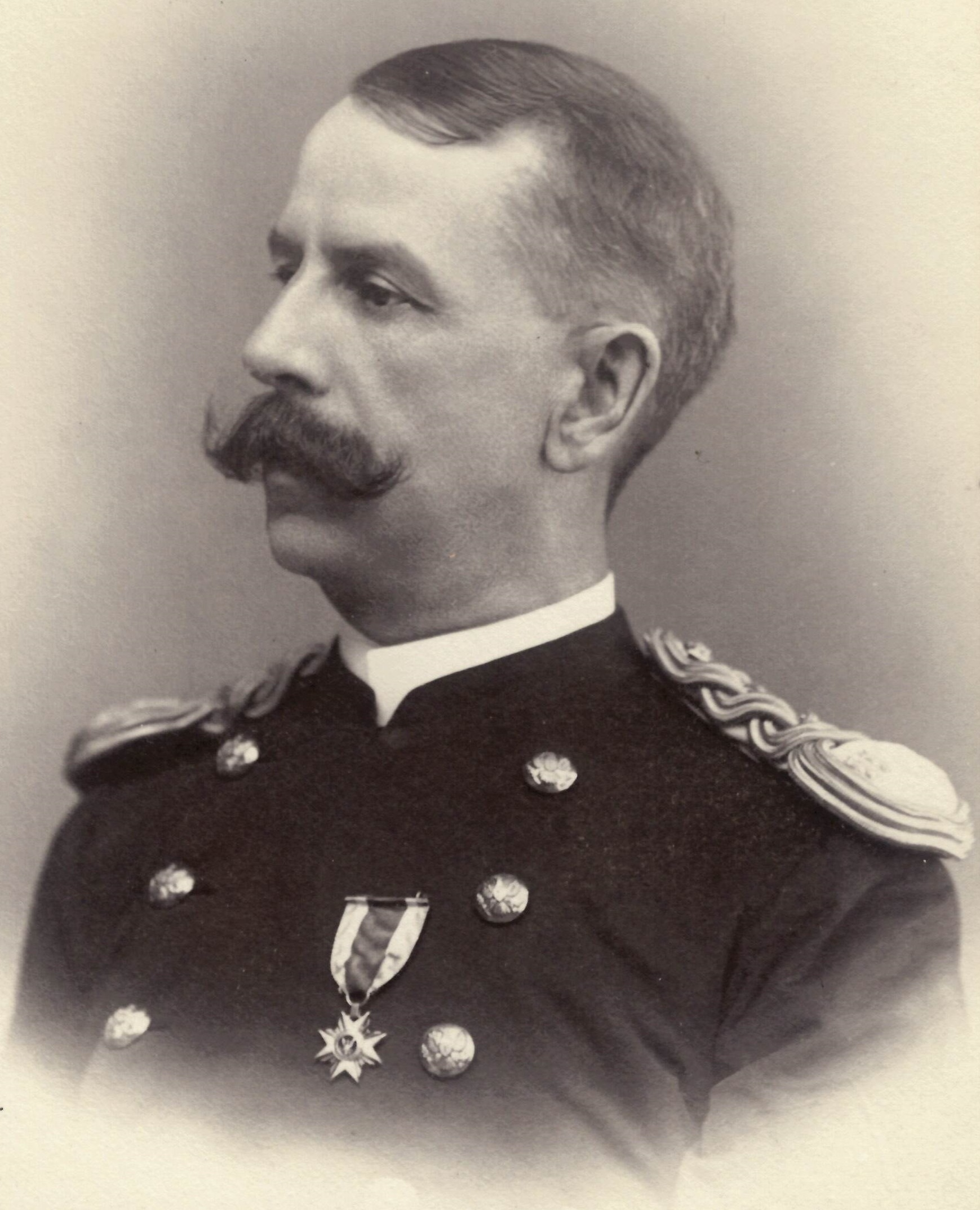
- Hodges as a captain on the faculty of Iowa Wesleyan University, July 1896
- Born: March 13, 1847; Providence, Rhode Island, U.S.
- Died: December 26, 1911 (aged 64); Washington, D.C., U.S.
- Burial place: Arlington National Cemetery
- Spouse: Anna L. Borden (m. 1879–1911, his death)
- Children: 2
- Relatives: Stephen Olney (great–grandfather)
- Military career
- Allegiance: Union (American Civil War)
- Service: Union Army; United States Army
- Service years: 1861–1865 (Union Army); 1865–1911 (U.S. Army)
- Rank: Major General
- Unit: U.S. Infantry Branch
- Commands: Military Department, Iowa Wesleyan University; Company M, 25th Infantry Regiment; 2nd Battalion, 25th Infantry Regiment; U.S. Army Recruiting Offices, Seattle and Portland; Fort Sam Houston, Texas; Fort Ontario, New York; 24th Infantry Regiment; District of Sulu; Department of the Visayas; Department of Dakota; Department of the Lakes
- Wars: American Civil War; American Indian Wars; Spanish–American War; Philippine–American War

Charles L. Hodges (March 13, 1847 – December 26, 1911) was a career officer in the United States Army. A Union Army veteran of the American Civil War, American Indian Wars, Spanish–American War, and Philippine–American War, Hodges remained in the army from 1861 until retiring in 1911 and attained the rank of major general.

A native of Providence, Rhode Island, in 1861 Hodges left high school at age 14 and began his military career in the enlisted ranks of the Union Army's 65th New York Infantry Regiment, which he joined for the American Civil War. He took part in most of the battles fought by the Army of the Potomac, and advanced from private to sergeant major by the end of the war. Afterwards, Hodges joined the U.S. Army's 18th Infantry Regiment as a private and advanced again to sergeant major before receiving his commission as a second lieutenant of Infantry in January 1875.

After obtaining his commission, Hodges served in the western United States, including postings to Texas and Dakota Territory during the American Indian Wars. He commanded a battalion during the Spanish–American War, including participation in the Battle of El Caney. After becoming a general officer in 1907, he commanded several departments during and immediately after the Philippine–American War, including the Department of the Visayas, Department of Dakota, and Department of the Lakes. He was promoted to major general in January 1911 and retired in March after attaining the mandatory retirement age of 64.

Hodges died in Washington, D.C., on December 26, 1911. He was buried at Arlington National Cemetery.

== Early life ==
Charles Libbeus Hodges was born in Providence, Rhode Island, on March 13, 1847, the son of Joseph Hodges and Eliza Brown (Olney) Hodges. His parents died when he was young, and Hodges was raised by relatives including his aunts Caroline Burt and Eva Olney. He attended the schools of Providence, and was a student at Providence High School in 1861.

At age 14, In April 1861 Hodges joined the Union Army for the American Civil War. He enlisted in the 65th New York Infantry Regiment, a unit that raised troops from other states, including Ohio, Connecticut, and Rhode Island. Hodges joined the regiment as a private and took part in most of the major battles involving the Army of the Potomac. During his wartime service, Hodges was wounded twice (Spotsylvania and Cedar Creek), and was promoted to corporal and sergeant. By the time the war ended, he was the 65th New York's regimental sergeant major.

After the war, Hodges decided to continue his military career and enlisted as a private in the United States Army's 18th Infantry Regiment, in which he again rose through the ranks to become the regimental sergeant major. Intending to obtain a commission, Hodges then transferred to the army's General Service as a corporal, after which he applied for appointment as an officer. Hodges's application was approved, and in April 1875 he received his commission as a second lieutenant of Infantry, effective from the previous January.

== Continued career ==
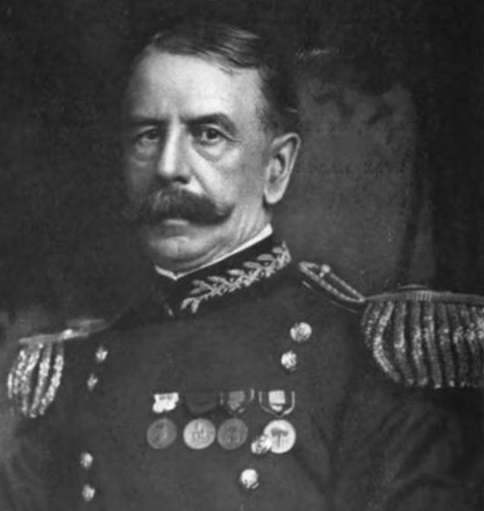
Hodges in full dress uniform in 1910

After receiving his commission, Hodges was assigned to the 25th Infantry Regiment. He served at posts in the western United States during the American Indian Wars, including Fort Concho, Texas, Fort Randall, Dakota Territory, and Fort Shaw, Montana, and was promoted to first lieutenant in 1880. Hodges was promoted to captain in 1890, and from 1895 to 1897 was commandant of the military program of instruction at Iowa Wesleyan University.

At the start of the Spanish–American War in 1898, Hodges was commander of Company M, 25th Infantry, which he led from its duty station in Colorado to its port of embarkation in Tampa, Florida. As commander of 2nd Battalion, 25th Infantry, Hodges served in Cuba and participated in the July 1, 1898 Battle of El Caney. After the war, he returned to command of Company M at Fort Logan, Colorado.

In January 1899, Hodges was recommended for promotion to major by brevet to recognize his heroism in Cuba. During 1899, Hodges performed temporary duty as commander of the army recruiting offices in Seattle and Portland, then commanded the post at Fort Sam Houston, Texas. In July 1900, he was promoted to major. In November 1900, he was assigned to the 17th Infantry Regiment for duty in the Philippines during the Philippine–American War. In August 1901, he transferred from the 17th Infantry to the 23rd Infantry. Hodges continued to serve with the 23rd Infantry after returning to the United States, and he was promoted to lieutenant colonel in August 1903. In 1906, Hodges was assigned to command the post at Fort Ontario, New York. In January 1907, he received promotion to colonel.

== Later career ==
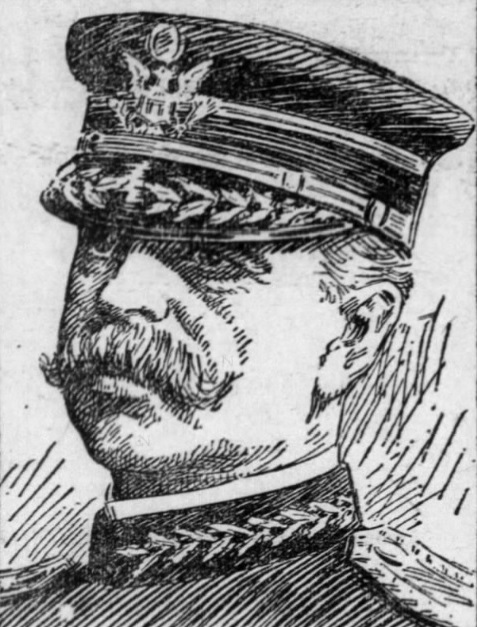
The Severance News (Severance, Kansas), April 21, 1911

In early 1907, Hodges commanded the 24th Infantry Regiment during duty in the Philippines. In April 1907, he was promoted to brigadier general and assigned to command the District of Sulu. From 1908 to 1909, Hodges commanded the Department of the Visayas.

After returning to the United States, Hodges commanded the Department of Dakota. From July 1910 to March 1911, Hodges commanded the Department of the Lakes, and he was promoted to major general in January 1911. Hodges left the army in March 1911 after attaining the mandatory retirement age of 64.

== Retirement and death ==
Hodges was active in the Freemasons and attained the 32nd degree of the Scottish Rite. He was a member of the Sons of the American Revolution by right of his descent from Stephen Olney, his great–grandfather. As the result of his own military service, Hodges belonged to the Military Order of the Loyal Legion of the United States and Society of the Army of Santiago de Cuba.

Hodges was in ill health at the time of his retirement. He died at his Washington, D.C., apartment on December 26, 1911. Hodges was buried at Arlington National Cemetery.

== Family ==
In 1879, Hodges married Anna L. Borden (1848–1929). They were the parents of two children. Son Carroll Borden Hodges (1882–1951) was a career army officer who attained the rank of lieutenant colonel. Daughter Jessie Olney Hodges (1884–1910) died after contracting dysentery while residing in the Philippines during her father's service there.
