= Mildred A. Bonham =

American travel writer (1840–1907)

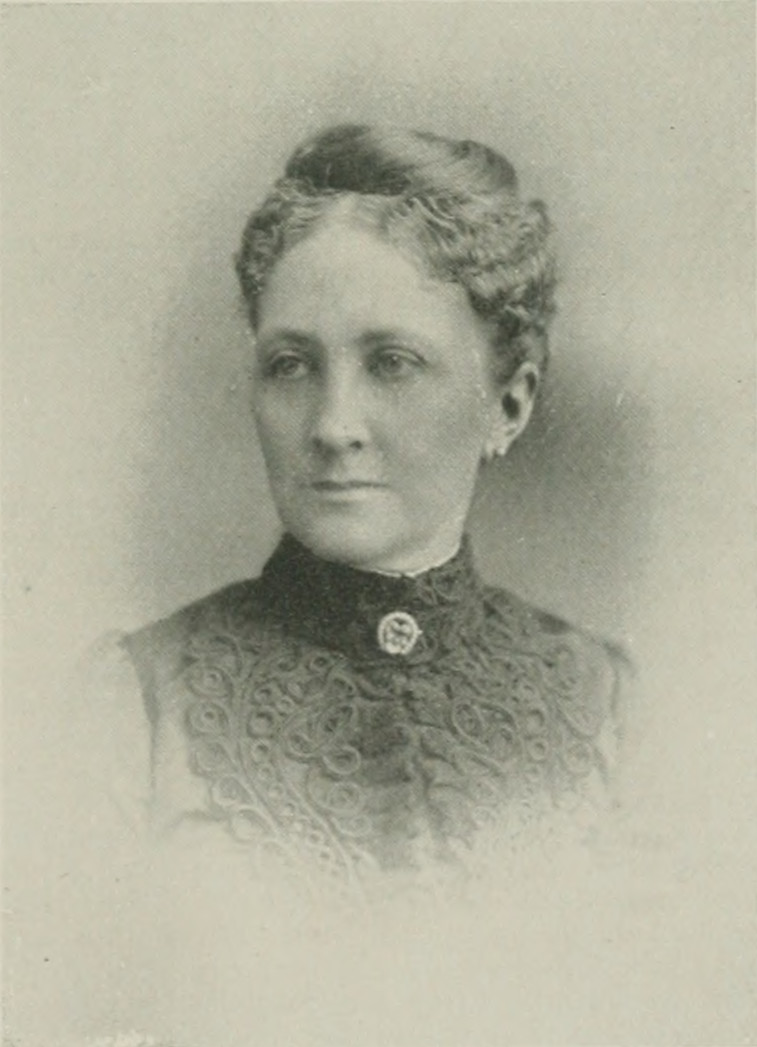
- Photo in A Woman of the Century
- Born: Mildred Amanda Baker; August 6, 1840; Magnolia, Illinois, U.S.
- Died: July 28, 1907 (aged 66); Salem, Oregon, U.S.
- Occupation: travel writer
- Spouse: Judge Benjamin F. Bonham
- Writing career
- Pen name: Mizpah

Mildred A. Bonham (née Baker; known by her pen name Mizpah; August 6, 1840 – July 28, 1907) was a 19th-century American travel writer from Illinois. In 1858, she married Judge Benjamin F. Bonham, later removing to Calcutta where her descriptions in the letters she wrote to the Oregon Statesman were eagerly read and highly commended. Her vivid stories clearly portrayed the beauties of that city and the social relations of the people. Bonham did some work among the women of India, and succeeded in raising US$1,000 to found a scholarship for women in one of the schools in India.

== Early life ==
Mildred Amanda Baker was born in Magnolia, Illinois, in August, 1840, her ancestors being from Virginia, South Carolina, and Tennessee. She was the eldest child of John Baker, an Oregon pioneer of 1847. Her parents removed to Oregon in 1847, settling in the Willamette Valley.

== Career ==
In 1858, she married Judge Benjamin F. Bonham, of Salem, Oregon. In 1885, Judge Bonham was appointed Consul-General to British India, and removed his family to Calcutta the same year. There were seven children from her marriage, only two of whom survived, Raphael P. Bonham, United States Immigration Inspector, stationed at Astoria, Oregon, and Mrs. Winona Larkins, of Salem.

Bonham always had a liking for literary work, but the cares of a large family and social duties gave her little leisure time, and it was not until her residence abroad that the opportunity came. During five years, her letters over the name " Mizpah" attracted much attention and were widely circulated by the Oregon and California press. Bonham had a gift of observing closely, and her descriptions of foreign scenes made a valuable addition to the knowledge of Anglo-Indian life and customs. Her letters from the Himalayas, Ceylon and other far-off places were considered the best. After returning to the United States, she gave several lectures on her experiences in the far East and life among the Zenanas.

== Death ==
Bonham died July 28, 1907, in Salem, one of the oldest pioneer residents of that city. Her papers are held in the Special Collections of the University of California, Santa Barbara.
