= Sam Barlow (pioneer) =

American pioneer and early settler of Oregon (1794–1867)

Sam K. Barlow
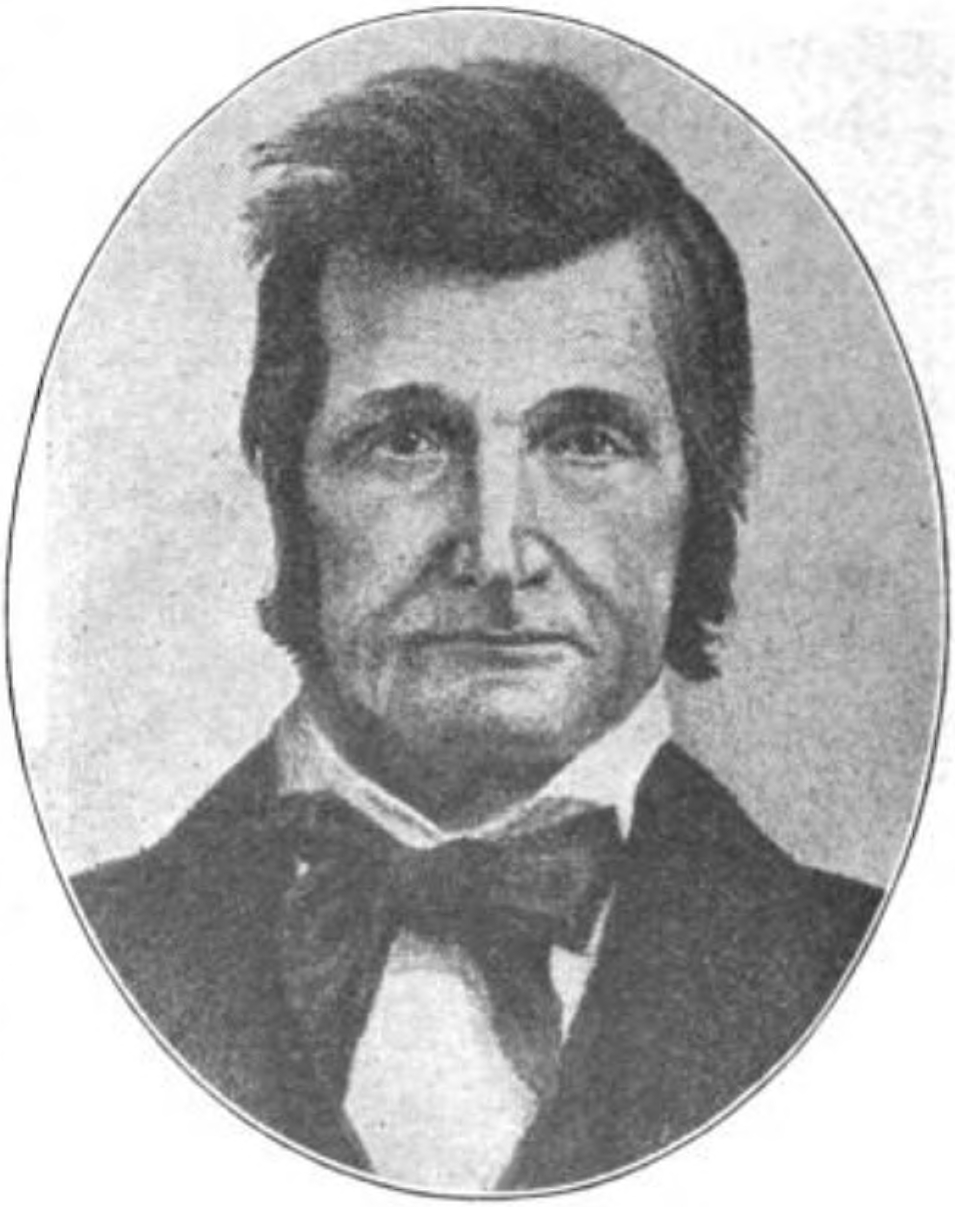
- Born: December 4, 1794; Nicholas County, Kentucky
- Died: July 15, 1867 (aged 72); Canemah, Oregon
- Occupation(s): Oregon pioneer, toll road owner/operator, Justice of the Peace
- Spouses: Susannah Lee, Elizabeth Garrison Shepard

Samuel Kimbrough Barlow (December 7, 1795 – July 14, 1867) was a pioneer in the area that became the U.S. state of Oregon, and was key in establishing the Barlow Road, the most widely chosen final segment to the Oregon Trail.

== Biography ==
Barlow was the son of William Henry Harrison Barlow and Sarah Kimbrough, born in Nicholas County, Kentucky. He trained as a tailor, and in 1818 moved to Bloomington, Indiana, where he married and started a family, perhaps in 1822. He and his wife, Susannah Lee, had six children: Sarah, James, John, Eliza Jane, Eli, and William.

Barlow was convicted of manslaughter in August 1827, for killing George Matlock with an ax on October 16, 1826. He was sentenced to one year of hard labor. Scores of people, including the victim's brother, pleaded for Barlow's pardon and quashing of his sentence since he did it to prevent harm to his wife and children. Indiana Governor James B. Ray pardoned him on December 6, 1827.

In 1845, when he was 53, Barlow's family arrived in Oregon. His party of seven wagons joined Joel Palmer's group of 23 wagons and explored and, after considerable difficulty, blazed a wagon trail over the Cascade Range, which became the Barlow Road in 1846. They arrived in Oregon City, Oregon on Christmas night.

Along the way Barlow made an early ascent of Mount Hood, though he did not reach the summit; he and Palmer were scouting a way for their wagon train to cross what is now Barlow Pass. On October 7, 1845, to see over trees and get a westward view to find a way off the mountain, they climbed to the 9,000 foot level of the mountain.

In the summer of 1850, Barlow was appointed Justice of the Peace for Clackamas County (which was much larger then) by acting Governor Kintzing Prichette.

On September 17, 1850, Barlow purchased the donation land claim of Thomas McKay, which he later sold to his son William. The land eventually became the town of Barlow, Oregon, named for William, not Samuel.

In 1854 Barlow, along with Cyrus Olney, Granville O. Haller, Thomas J. Dryer, Wells Lake, and T.O. Travailliot were reported as making the first ascent of Mount Hood, though the report has been disputed.

Barlow is buried beside Susannah Lee Barlow at Barlow.

There is also a high school east of Gresham, Oregon, Sam Barlow High School, named after him.

== See also ==
- William Barlow House
