= William Barlow House =

Historic house in Oregon, United States

- U.S. National Register of Historic Places
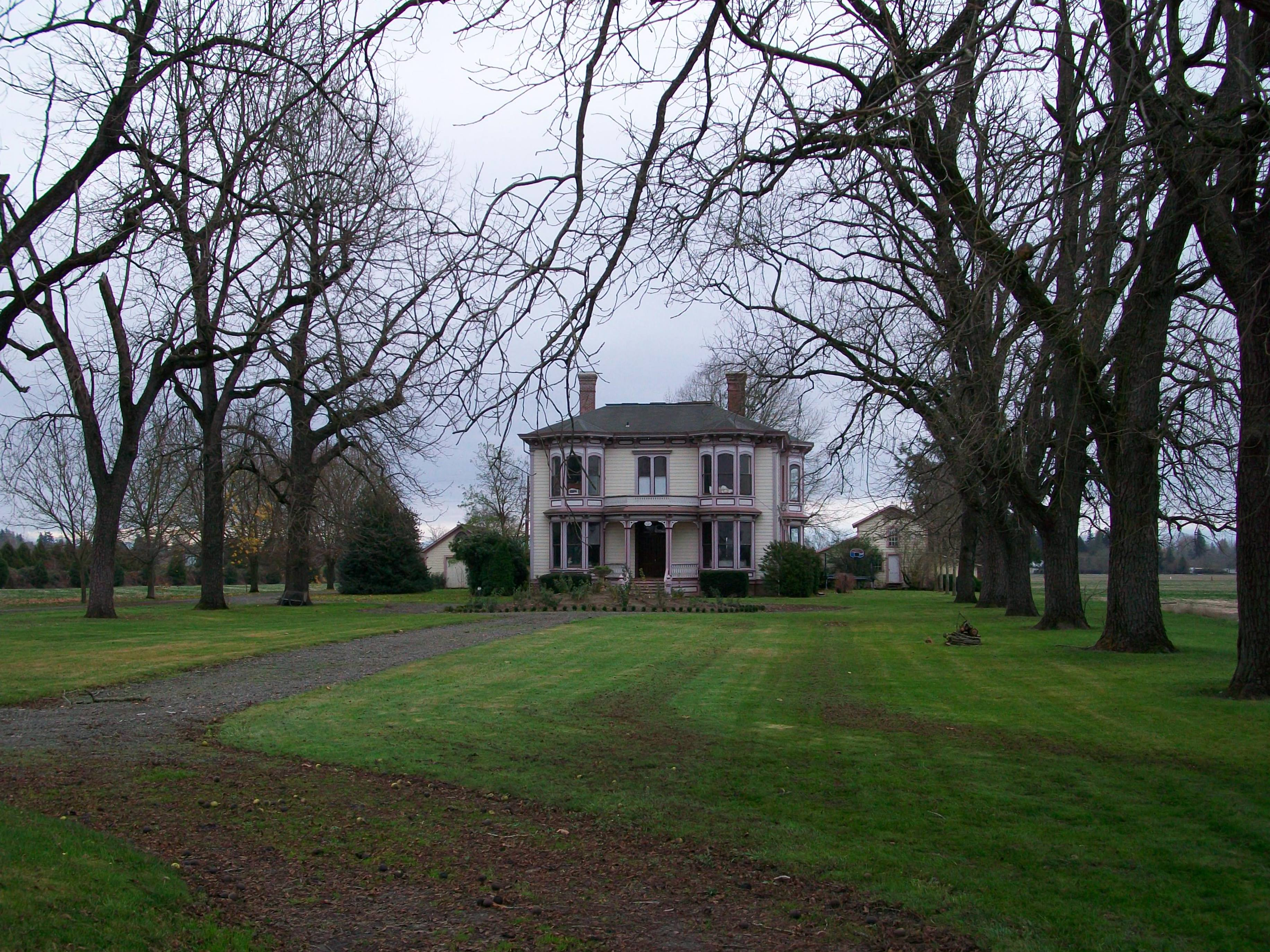
- Barlow House near Barlow, Oregon

- Location within Oregon Location within the United States
- Nearest city: Canby, Oregon
- Coordinates: 45°15′00″N 122°43′13″W
- Area: 3 acres (1.2 ha)
- Built: 1885
- Architectural style: High Victorian Italianate
- NRHP reference No.: 77001098
- Added to NRHP: February 15, 1977

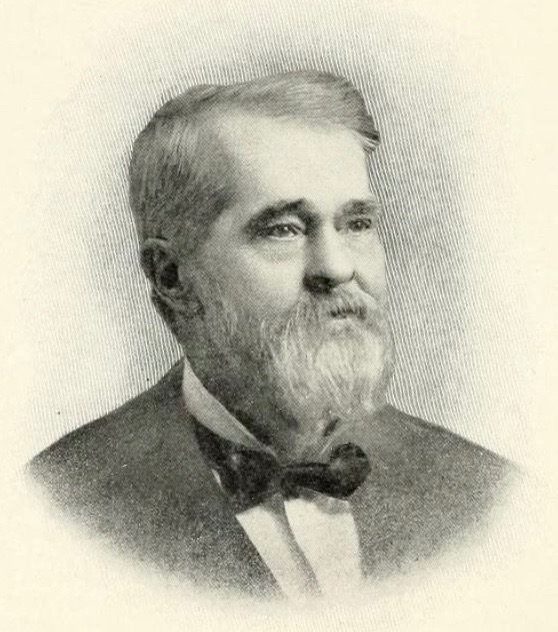
William Barlow

William Barlow House (or Barlow House) is a historic building in Clackamas County, Oregon, United States.

Barlow House was home to William Barlow, namesake of the city of Barlow and son of Samuel K. Barlow, who built the Barlow Road. The house is located south of Barlow, between Canby and Aurora on 99E. It was built in an Italianate style in 1885, and listed on the National Register of Historic Places on February 15, 1977. It now operates as a privately owned museum and is open by appointment.
