= Benjamin F. Bonham =

American judge

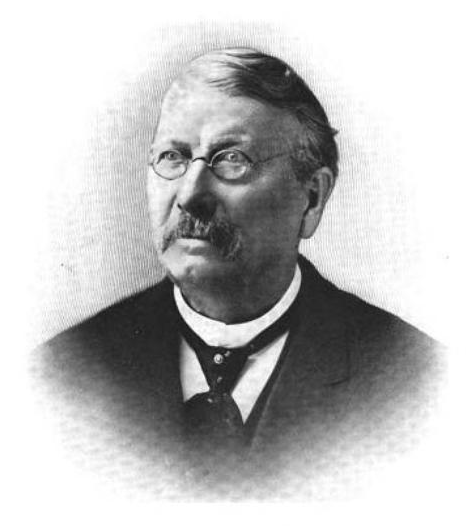

9th Chief Justice of the Oregon Supreme Court
- In office 1874–1876
- Preceded by: William W. Upton
- Succeeded by: Paine Page Prim

22nd Justice of the Oregon Supreme Court
- In office 1870–1876
- Preceded by: Reuben P. Boise
- Succeeded by: Reuben P. Boise

Personal details
- Born: October 8, 1828 near Knoxville, Tennessee
- Died: June 2, 1906 (aged 77) Salem, Oregon
- Spouse: Mildred A. Baker

Benjamin F. Bonham (October 8, 1828 – June 2, 1906) was an American educator, politician, and judge in Oregon. He was the 9th chief justice of the Oregon Supreme Court from 1870 to 1876. Prior to joining the court he was in the Oregon Territorial Legislature and the first State Legislature. Later the Tennessee native served as United States Consul General in Calcutta, India.

== Early life ==
Bonham was born October 8, 1828, near Knoxville, Tennessee. His parents were John Bonham and the former Sarah Jones. Benjamin was raised in Knoxville and Muncie, Indiana, where he received his education at the local schools. After his own education he taught school in Indiana. In 1853 he moved to the Oregon Territory.

== Oregon ==
After arriving in Oregon he took up teaching again, this time at French Prairie and in Salem. During this time Bonham also studied law, and then joined the bar in 1856. Beginning in 1858 he started his political career when he was elected to the Territorial Legislature. Later that year he served in Oregon's last Territorial Legislature as the citizens awaited statehood. Bonham was then elected to the state's first legislature, serving as a Democrat from Marion County. Each time he served in the legislature, he served in the lower chamber House of Representatives. In 1859, he married in Salem to Mildred A. Baker; they would have seven children.

In 1870, Bonham was elected to the Oregon Supreme Court to replace Reuben P. Boise, who would then replace Bonham six years later when Bonham's term ended. While on the court, Bonham served as chief justice from 1874 to 1876. Bonham narrowly lost to Boise by 18 votes after having a 44-vote lead at one point during the vote count.

== Later years ==
In 1885, President Grover Cleveland appointed Bonham to be Consul General to British-controlled India at Calcutta. Later he returned to Salem where he served as postmaster from 1894 to 1898, and was a professor at Willamette University College of Law. He then returned to the practice of law until he died in Salem on June 2, 1906.
