= Gladstone Springhouse and Bottling Plant =

- U.S. National Register of Historic Places
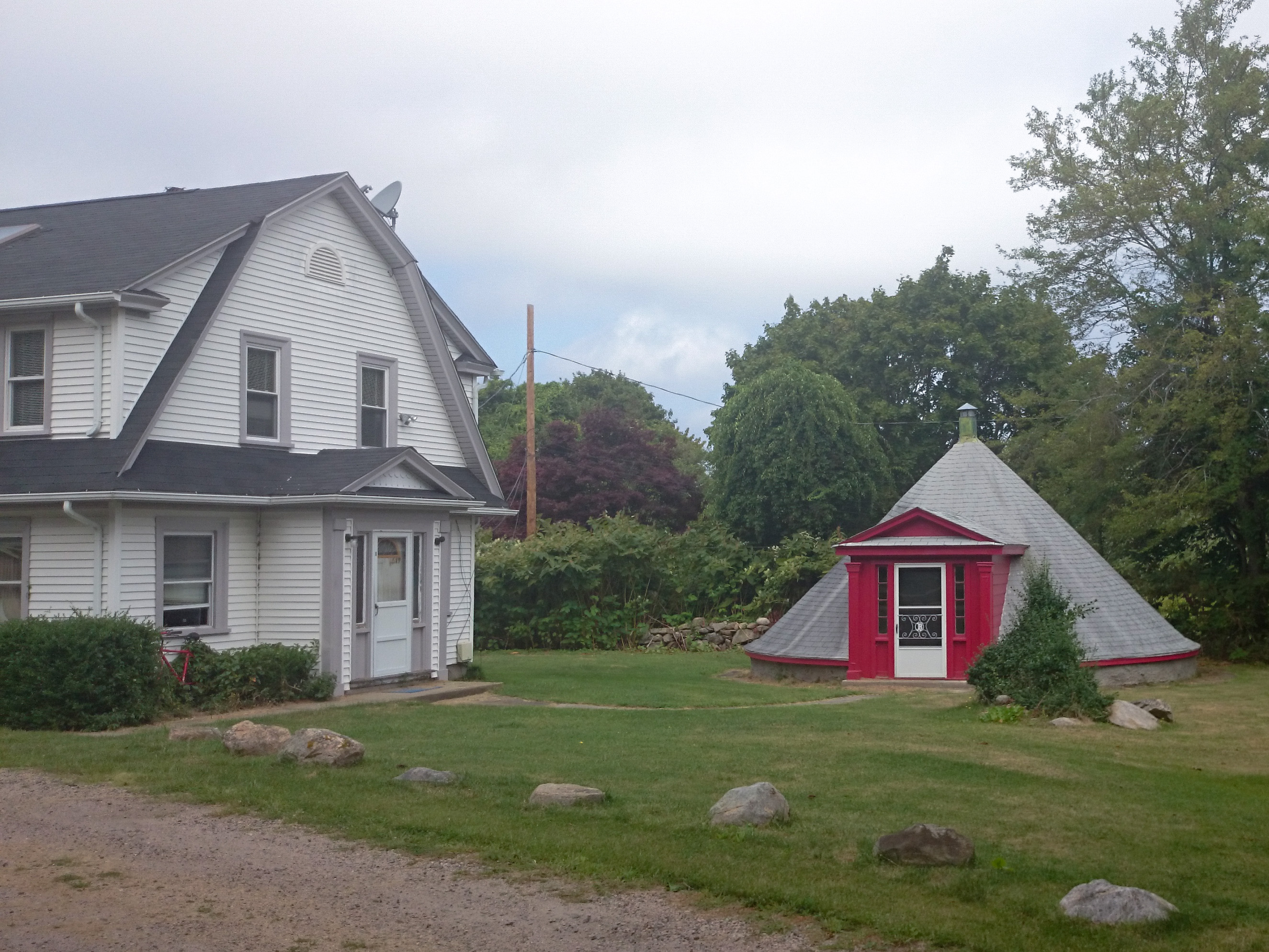
- Gladstone Springhouse and Bottling Plant, 145A Boon St., Narragansett

- Location within Rhode Island Location within the United States
- Location: Narragansett, Rhode Island
- Coordinates: 41°25′35″N 71°27′25″W
- Built: 1899
- Architect: Hazard, T. G., Jr.
- Architectural style: Colonial Revival
- NRHP reference No.: 84002051
- Added to NRHP: May 10, 1984

The Gladstone Springhouse and Bottling Plant is an historic water bottling facility at 145a Boon Street in Narragansett, Rhode Island.

The springhouse was constructed in 1899 by T. G. Hazard, Jr. The bottling plant building may date from as early as 1911. The site was added to the National Register of Historic Places in 1984.

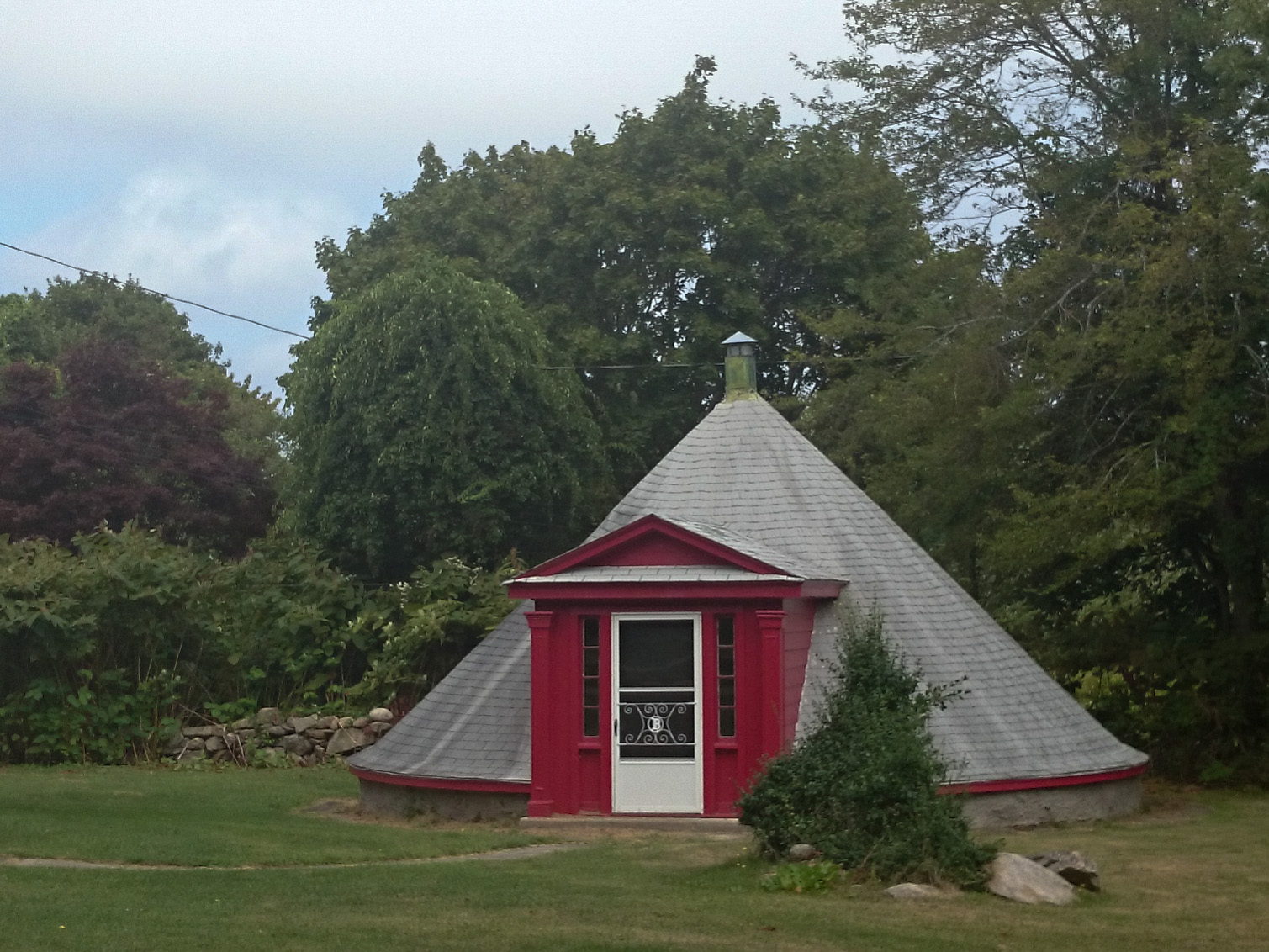
Gladstone Springhouse

The springhouse collects the water of Gladstone Springs. It contains about seven and a half feet of water. It is a round stone structure, 30 feet (9.1 m) in diameter and standing only about 18 inches (460 mm) above grade, and is covered by a conical roof. A projecting gable-roof dormer contains the doorway to the building.

Southwest of the spring house stands a two-story wood-frame structure with a large single-story concrete-block addition, which has seen a variety of uses. The first floor is believed to have originally housed offices, but has been converted to apartments. The upstairs appears to have always been an apartment, probably for the facility manager. The concrete block structure is where bottling and shipping took place.

== History ==
The availability of fresh spring water via Gladstone Springs was significant to the development of Narragansett Pier, Rhode Island, as a resort area in the decades following the Civil War. In 1899, T. G. Hazard, Jr., built the springhouse to enlarge and cover a pit previously used to collect the spring water.

In 1911, the property was purchased by Syria W. Mathewson, William R. Sweet, and Frederick C. Olney, who formed the Gladstone Springs Water Company. Olney was particularly notable among the group, as one of the first African-American lawyers admitted to practice in the state of Rhode Island. They built the bottling plant structure and enlarged the facilities, intending to begin the production of bottled sodas as well as spring water.

== See also ==
- National Register of Historic Places listings in Washington County, Rhode Island
