= Onley =

Onley may refer to:

- Onley, Virginia, a town in Accomack County, Virginia, United States
- Onley (lost settlement), a lost village in Northamptonshire, England
- Onley (HM Prison), a Category C men's prison in Warwickshire, England
- David Onley, Canadian journalist, lieutenant governor of Ontario
- Oscar Onley (born 2002), Scottish cyclist

== See also ==
- Only (disambiguation)
- Olney (disambiguation)
