= Olney station =

Olney station may refer to:

- Olney railway station (England), a former railway station in Olney, Buckinghamshire, England
- Olney station (SEPTA), a SEPTA Regional Rail station in Philadelphia, Pennsylvania, USA
- Olney Transportation Center, a SEPTA subway and bus station in Philadelphia, Pennsylvania, USA

== See also ==
- Olney (disambiguation)
