= Capt. Stephen Olney House =

Historic house in Rhode Island, United States

- U.S. National Register of Historic Places
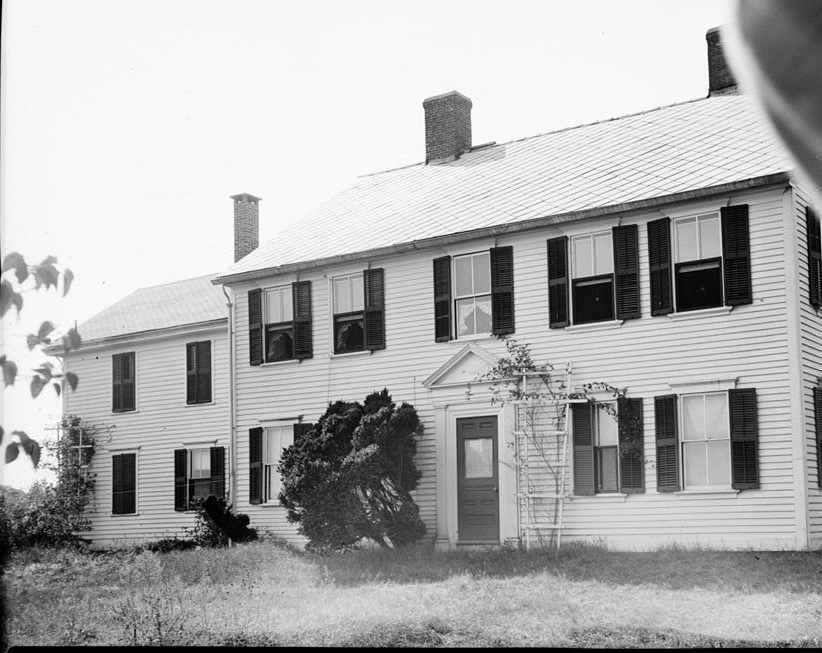
- Historic American Buildings Survey photo, unknown date

- Location within Rhode Island Location within the United States
- Location: 138 Smithfield Road, North Providence, Rhode Island
- Coordinates: 41°51′19″N 71°27′5″W
- Built: 1802
- Architectural style: Federal
- NRHP reference No.: 74000003
- Added to NRHP: May 1, 1974

The Captain Stephen Olney House is a historic site in North Providence, Rhode Island. It is a 2 1/2-story wood-frame structure, five bays wide, with a pair of interior chimneys. The principal exterior decoration is in the front door surround, which features pilasters supporting an entablature and gable pediment. The house was built in 1802 by Stephen Olney, a veteran of the American Revolutionary War, on what was then a large farm. His descendants enlarged the house in the 1840s, adding an ell to the south.

The house was listed on the National Register of Historic Places in 1974.

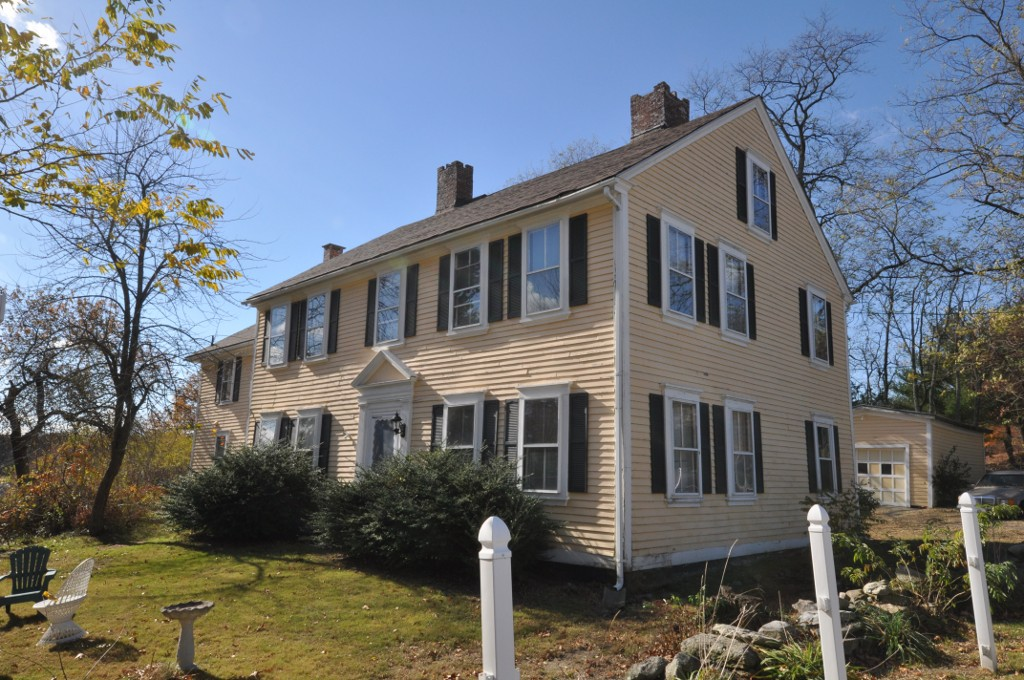

== See also ==
- National Register of Historic Places listings in Providence County, Rhode Island
