= Frederick C. Olney =

African-American lawyer and entrepreneur

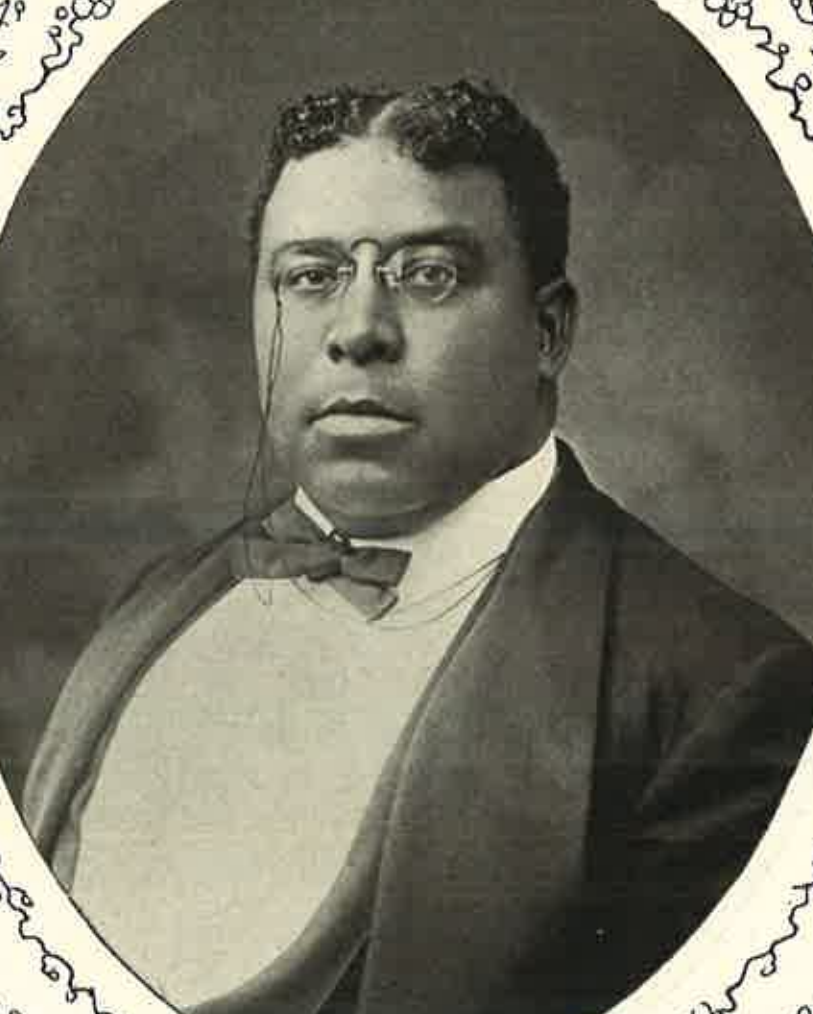
- Frederick C. Olney c. 1904
- Born: July 15, 1862; Griswold, Connecticut
- Died: May 24, 1918 (aged 55); Wakefield, Rhode Island
- Occupations: Lawyer and entrepreneur
- Political party: Republican

Frederick Clayton Olney (July 15, 1862 – May 24, 1918) was an African-American lawyer and entrepreneur. A resident of Wakefield, Rhode Island, with Native American ancestry, he was one of the first African-American lawyers admitted to the bar in the state, and one of the founders of the Gladstone Springs Water Company (which operated the historic water bottling facility in Narragansett).

== Early life and education ==
Olney was born on July 15, 1862 in Griswold, Connecticut to Gills P. and Betsey A. (Brewster) Olney. He was a descendant of the Narragansett people whose tribal relations were abolished in 1881, (Note: The tribe was federally reinstated in 1983.) and was "the only one known to have ever been a practitioner in the State or even in the country".

Olney received his education in the South Kingstown High School, and the University of Michigan at Ann Arbor, graduating from the latter June 28, 1888. He was admitted to the bar in Michigan in 1888, and in Rhode lsland on March 10, 1889. Olney also became a notary public for Washington County, Rhode Island, in 1889.

== Legal career and legacy ==
Olney was the third African-American to gain admission to practice law in Rhode Island, after John Henry Ballou and Maurice Baumann. While Ballou and Baumann each left the state within a few years of their admission to practice elsewhere, Olney remained throughout his career. In 1906, Olney was listed as the treasurer of the Wakefield Yacht Club.

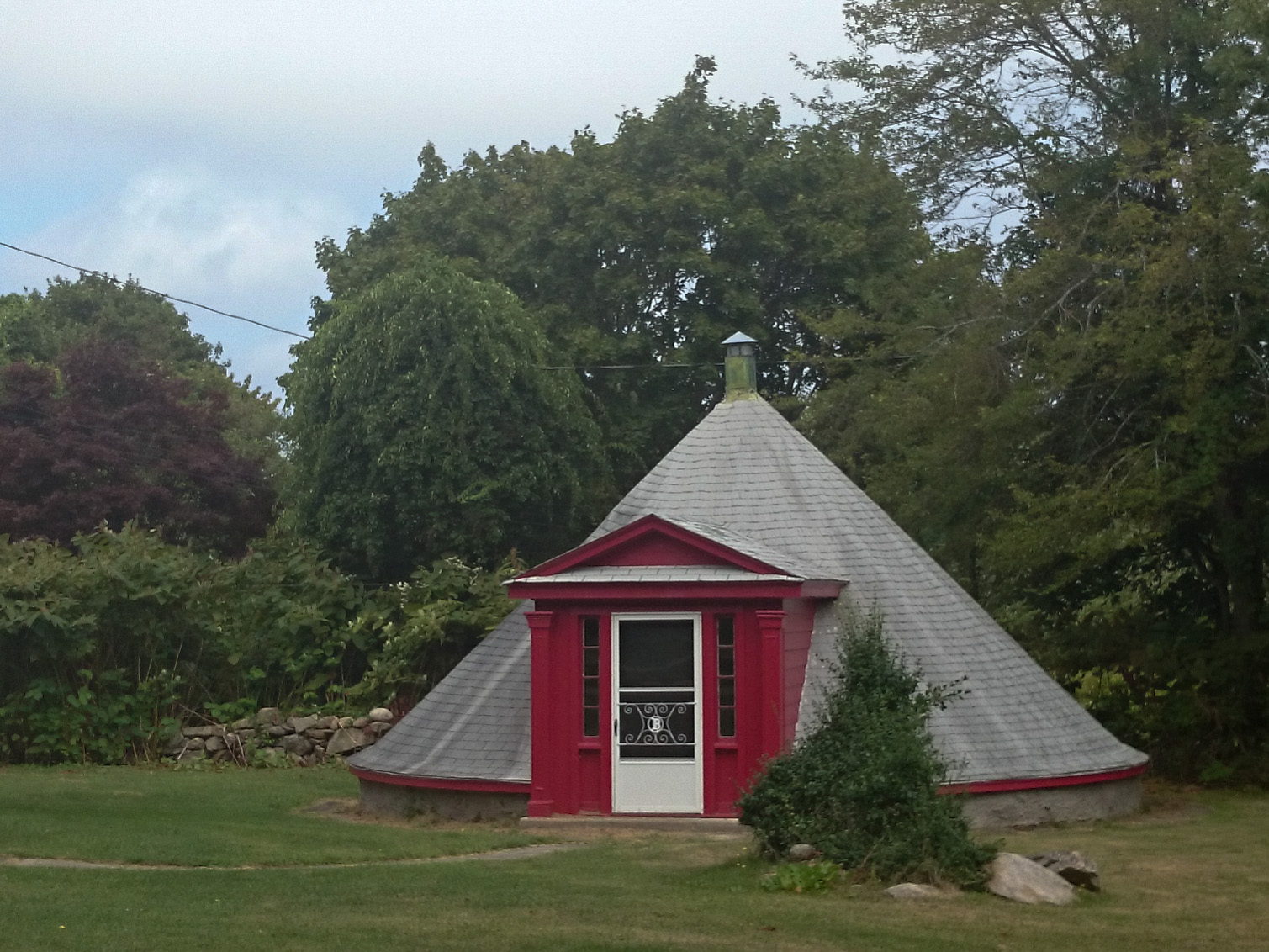
Gladstone Springhouse, once co-owned by Olney

In 1911, Olney and business partners Syria W. Mathewson and William Sweet purchased Gladstone Springs in Narragansett, and incorporated the Gladstone Springs Water Company, building a springhouse and bottling factory on the site. The Gladstone Springhouse and Bottling Plant was added to the National Register of Historic Places in 1984.

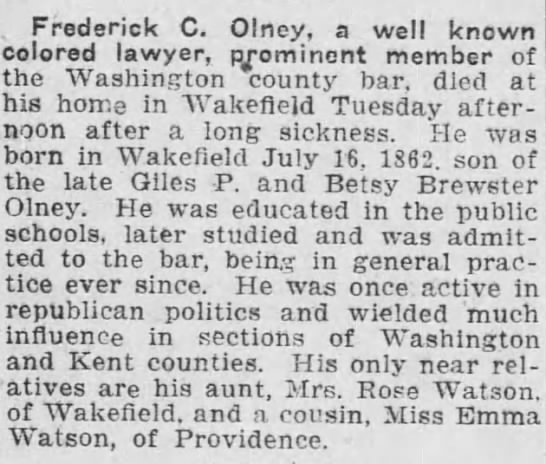
Olney's obituary in the Norwich Bulletin in 1918

Olney "practiced law in Rhode Island for thirty years and was well respected". He died in Wakefield at the age of 55. Upon his death, "a statement of praise for Olney by judges and the Washington County Bar Association" was "adopted and ordered spread upon the records of the court."

== Political activities ==
Olney was a member of the Republican Party. His obituary in the Norwich Bulletin noted he was "once active in republican [sic] politics and wielded much influence in sections of Washington and Kent counties".
