= Rock Corral on the Barlow Road =

Glacial erratic on Oregon State's Barlow Road

- U.S. National Register of Historic Places
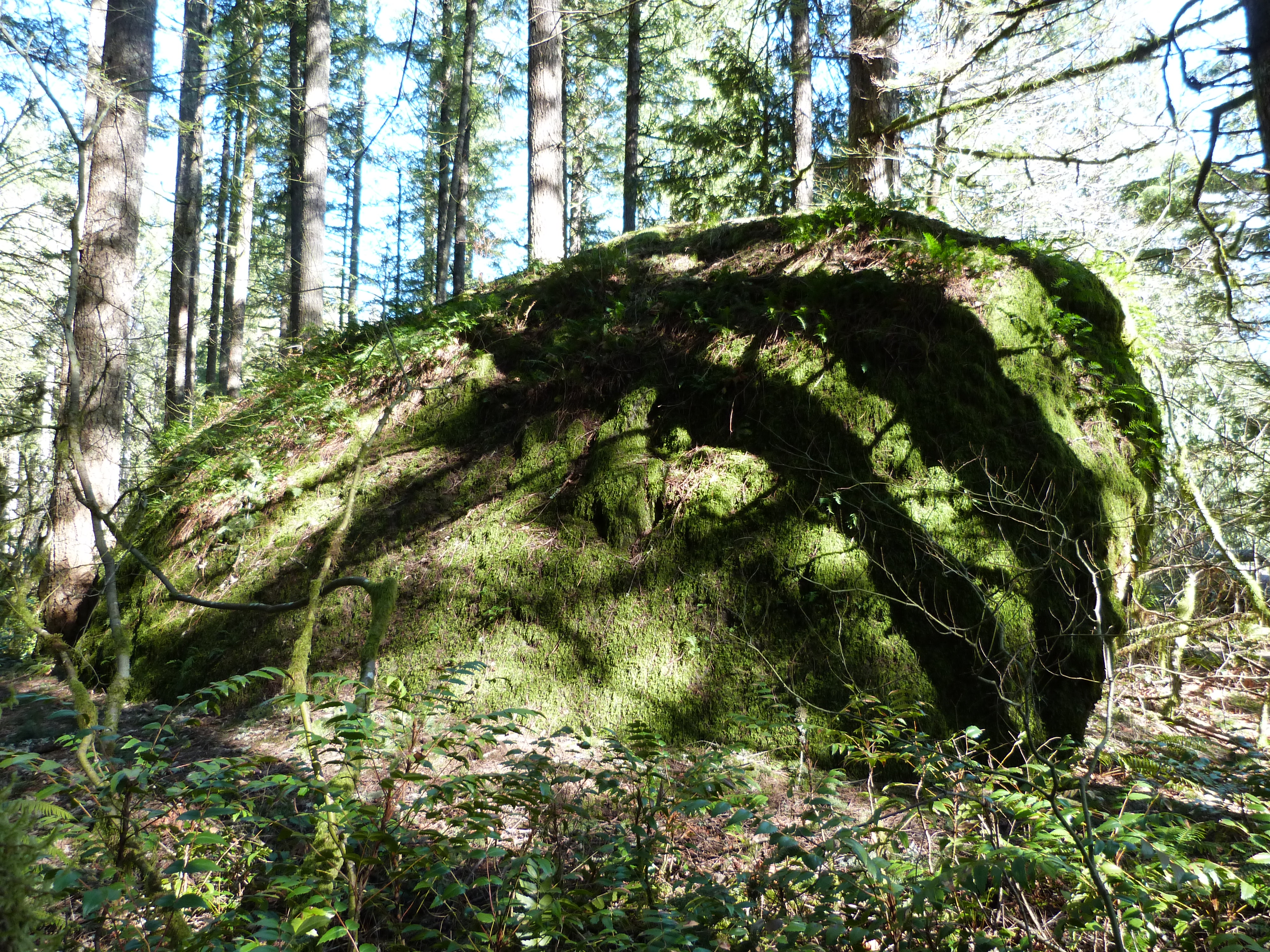
- Rock Corral - Barlow Road

- Location within Oregon
- Nearest city: Brightwood, Oregon
- Coordinates: 45°23′00″N 122°03′52″W
- Area: 5 acres (2.0 ha)
- NRHP reference No.: 74001673
- Added to NRHP: December 19, 1974

The Rock Corral on the Barlow Road is a glacial erratic, on Oregon's Barlow Road, itself a new route on the Oregon Trail.

== Its location ==
It is on the way to Marmot, where the Barlow Road then goes southwest cross the Devil's Backbone and back across the Sandy River.

It is in Clackamas County, and was at the end of the Oregon Trail's most difficult, most dangerous passage over the Cascade Mountains. The Barlow Tollgate was once there.

== See also ==
- List of individual rocks

== External links and references ==
- BLM site
- Site with a map
- National Registerof Historic Places site
- Google site
