= Justice Olney =

Justice Olney may refer to:

- Cyrus Olney (1815–1870), the 6th associate justice of the Oregon Supreme Court
- Warren Olney Jr. (1870–1939), associate justice of the Supreme Court of California
