= Olney, Oregon =

Unincorporated community in Clatsop County, Oregon, United States

Coordinates: 46.100109°N 123.757637°W

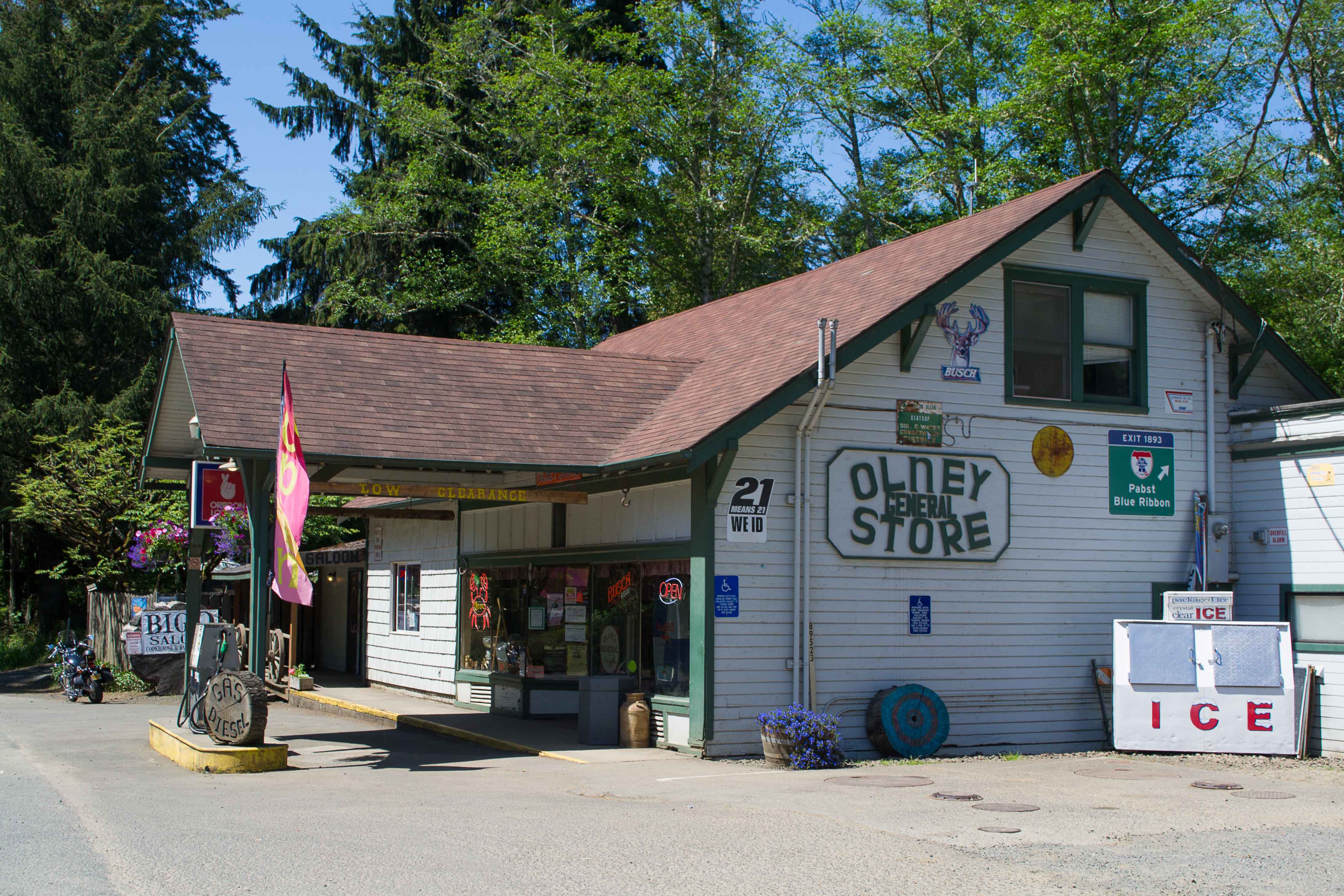
The general store in Olney, May 2013

Olney is an unincorporated community and former company town in Clatsop County, Oregon, United States, on Oregon Route 202 approximately eight miles (13 km) southeast of Astoria.

== Description ==
The town of Olney was named after Oregon Territory Supreme Court justice Cyrus Olney, who was from Astoria. Its post office is assigned ZIP code 97325.

There were several logging camps near Olney, many originally only accessible by boat up the Youngs River or by Albert S. Kerry's Columbia and Nehalem River Railroad. In 1910, the Western Cooperage Company camp was established in Olney. It was run by the Tidewater Timber Company from 1923 to 1943. Western Cooperage provided company housing for its workers and in 1915 the population was 50, which was near its maximum. Olney post office was established in 1875 and ran until 1950. Today, Olney still has a general store.
