= Stephen Olney =

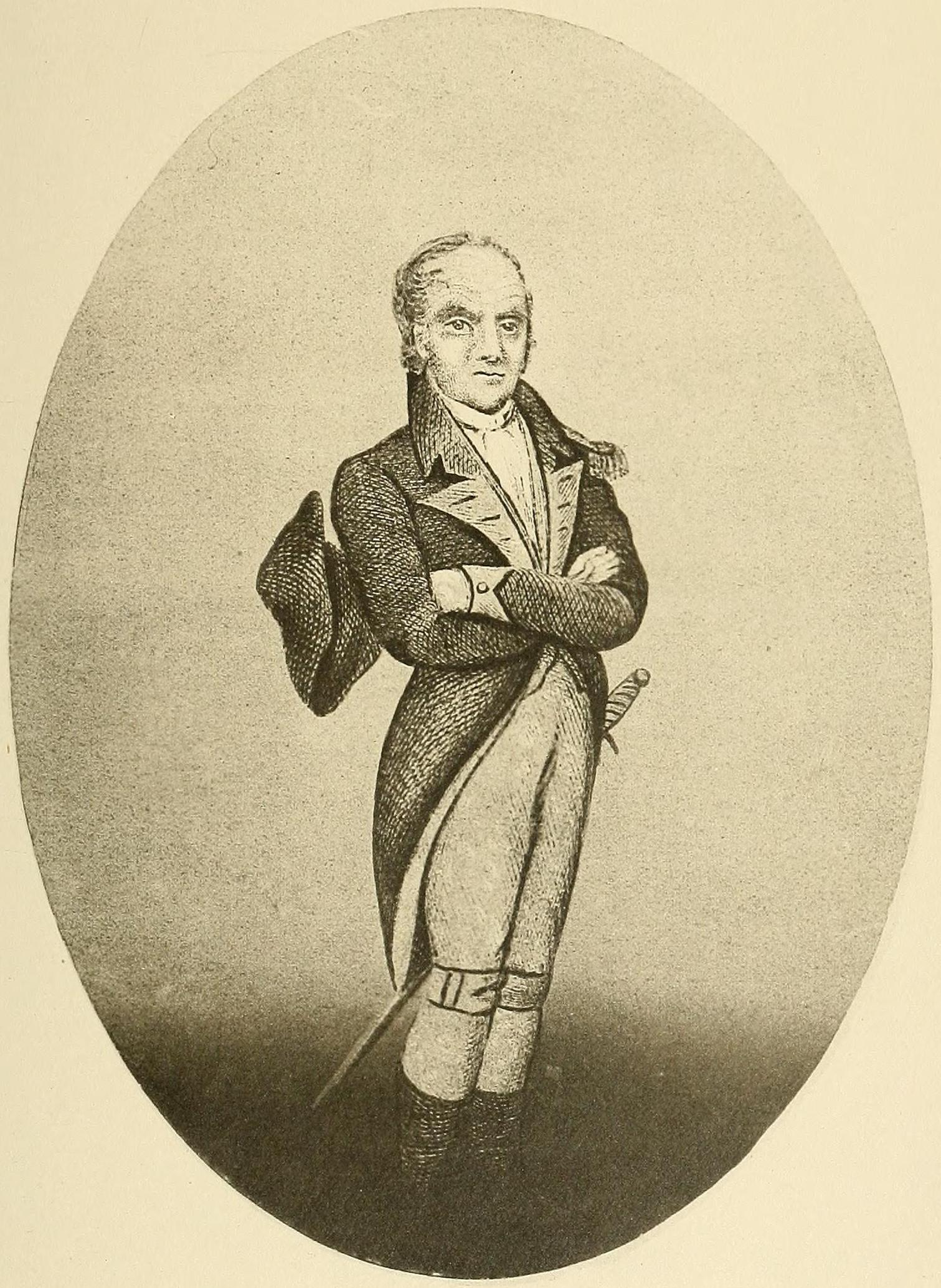
- Born: October 12, 1755; North Providence, Rhode Island
- Died: November 23, 1832 (aged 77); North Providence, Rhode Island

Stephen Olney (October 12, 1755, North Providence, Rhode Island – November 23, 1832) was a soldier in the Continental Army during the American Revolutionary War and later a Rhode Island legislator.

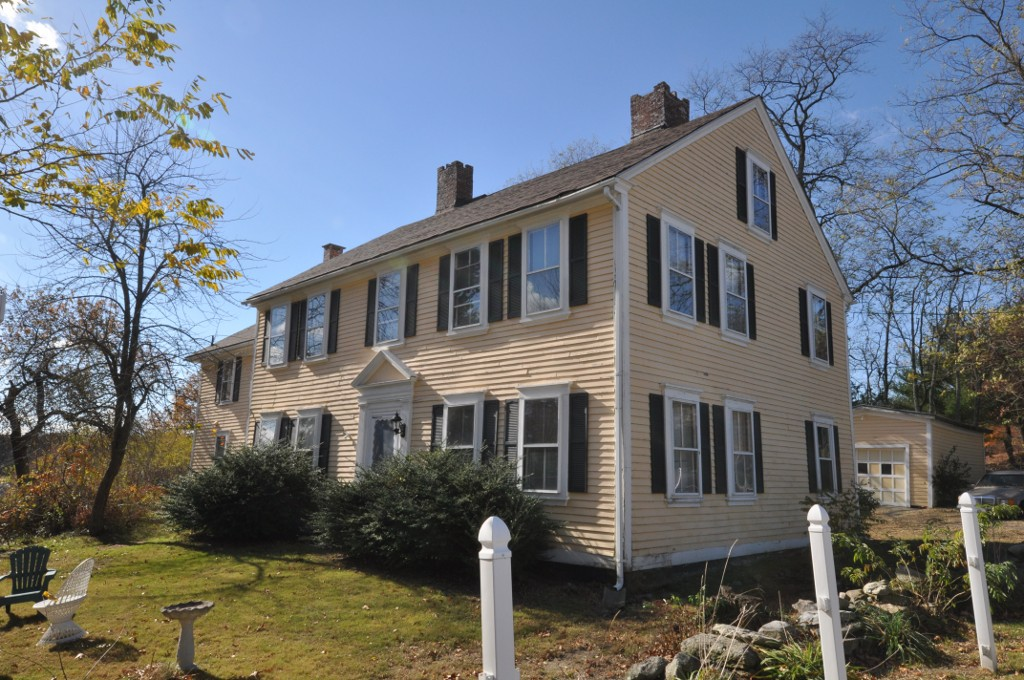
Stephen Olney's house in North Providence

== Biography ==
Stephen Olney entered the service as an ensign in Hitchcock's Regiment (14th Continentals) May 1775, joining the Continental Army's 11th Continental Infantry in January, 1776 as a Lieutenant and participating in the siege of Boston, battles of Long Island, Harlem Heights, White Plains, Second Trenton, and Princeton. He became a Captain in the Second Rhode Island in January, 1777 where he saw service at the Battles of Red Bank, Monmouth, Rhode Island, and Springfield, where he was wounded. By act of Congress the 2nd Rhode Island and 1st Rhode Island were merged along with Sherburne's Battilion and served at the siege of Yorktown under Lafayette. Captain Olney lead the American sappers over the top of Redoubt 10, calling back to his troops "in a tone as if there were no danger, Capt. Olney's company form here". Armed with only an espontoon, he was immediately attacked by 6 to 8 bayonets. The Americans took the redoubt in about 10 minutes, but Capt. Olney was badly wounded including a bayonet in the gut which was thought to be fatal. He was sent to the hospital in Williamsburg where he recovered and returned to his regiment 3 weeks later. He resigned in May, of 1782, stating in a letter to General Washington that since the war was over, he felt it was not honorable to remain in the Army waiting to be paid. He returned to Providence and subsequently represented North Providence in the legislature for twenty years, besides holding various other town offices. Olney was also an Original Member with the Rhode Island Society of the Cincinnati.

== Family ==
Olney's ancestor Thomas Olney was one of the founders of Rhode Island and was the second pastor of the first Baptist Church in America.

Charles L. Hodges, Olney's great-grandson, was a career officer in the U.S. Army and attained the rank of major general.

== See also ==
- Capt. Stephen Olney House

== Additional reading ==
- Wilson, J. G.; Fiske, J., eds. (1900). "Olney, Jeremiah" . Appletons' Cyclopædia of American Biography. New York: D. Appleton. This work in turn cites:
  - Catherine Williams, Lives of Barton and Olney (Providence, 1839)
