= Mirror Lake (Clackamas County, Oregon) =

Mountain lake in Oregon, United States

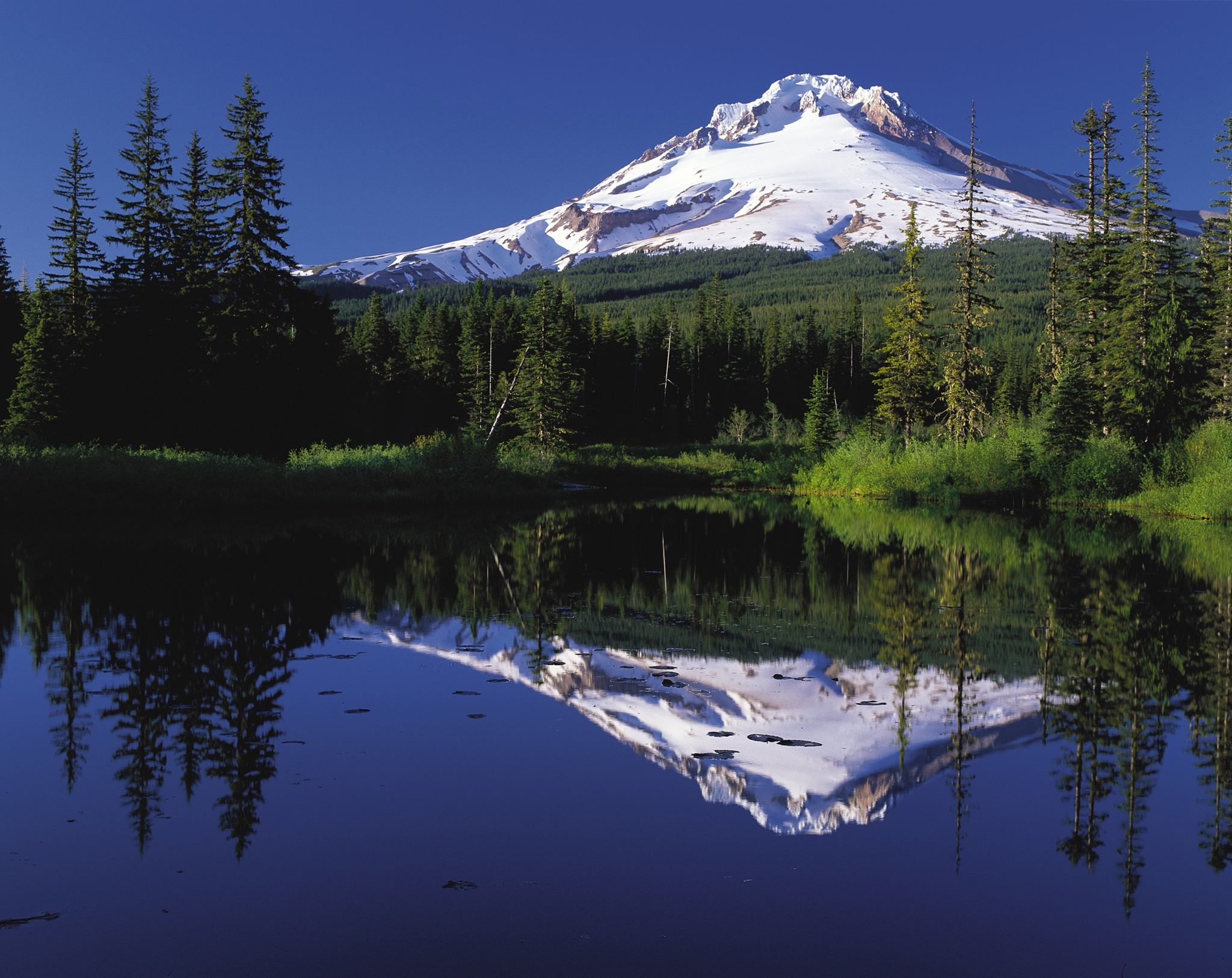
- Mount Hood reflected in Mirror Lake, Oregon

- Location in the State of Oregon Mirror Lake (the United States)
- Location: Mount Hood foothills, Oregon
- Coordinates: 45.297063°N 121.793134°W
- Basin countries: United States
- Max. length: 180 m (590 ft)
- Max. width: 120 m (390 ft)
- Average depth: 4 m (13 ft)
- Max. depth: 19 m (62 ft)
- Surface elevation: 1,252 m (4,108 ft)
- Frozen: winter, early spring

Mirror Lake is a mountain lake in Clackamas County of the U.S. state of Oregon. It is located at the foot of Tom Dick and Harry Mountain in a natural catchment formed by a toe of the mountain, 11.4 kilometres (7.1 mi) southwest of Mount Hood, and 3.1 kilometres (1.9 mi) WSW of Government Camp within Mount Hood National Forest.

It is among the most popular day hikes in the Mount Hood area, and a popular Nordic skiing destination. Its 400-foot (120 m) elevation gain in 1.9 miles (3.1 km) is considered an easy hike.
