= Tom Dick and Harry Mountain =

Volcanic mountain in Clackamas County, Oregon, United States

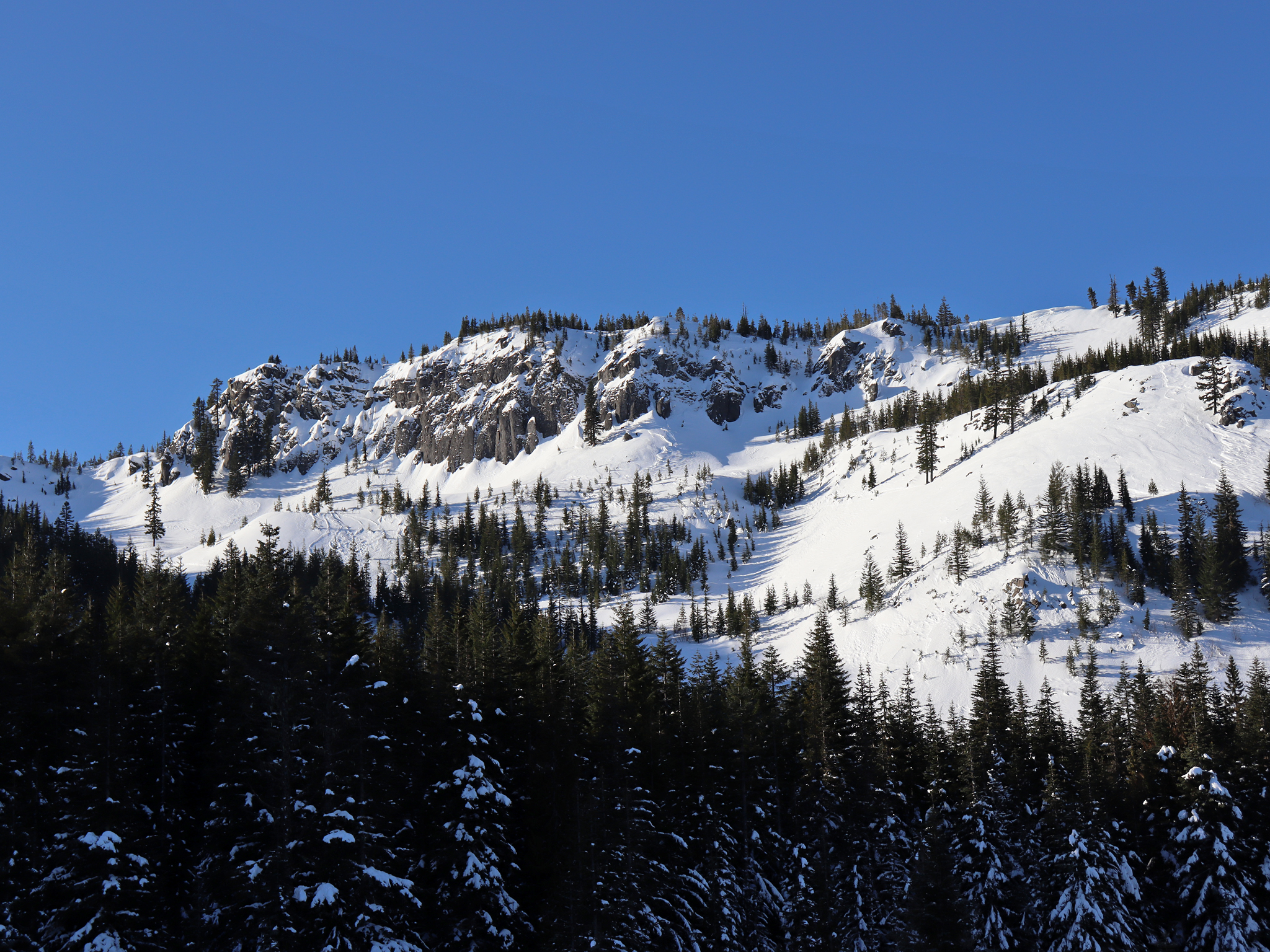
- Tom Dick and Harry Mountain in snow

Highest point
- Elevation: 5,070 ft (1,545 m) NAVD 88
- Prominence: 1,146 ft (349 m)
- Coordinates: 45°17′24″N 121°47′29″W

Geography
- Location within Oregon
- Location: Clackamas County, Oregon, U.S.
- Parent range: Cascade Range
- Topo map: USGS Government Camp

Tom Dick and Harry Mountain is a 2-mile-long (3.2 km) volcanic mountain in Clackamas County in the U.S. state of Oregon. It is located 7.2 miles (11.6 km) southwest of Mount Hood, 1.9 miles (3.1 km) west-southwest of Government Camp between the Zigzag River and Still Creek, south of Zigzag Mountain. Because of its proximity to Mount Hood, it is considered a foothill.

The mountain is named for its three distinct peaks along the summit, forming the cirque that is now part of the Mount Hood Skibowl ski resort. The highest peak has an elevation of 5,070 feet (1,545 m). The name was in use as early as 1897, according to Elijah "Lige" Coalman, the namesake of Coalman Glacier. The mountain has also been called "Tom Dick Mountain" in the past, although the Board on Geographic Names officially decided in favor of including "Harry" in 1969, making the mountain's name a play on the phrase "Tom, Dick and Harry". It has frequently been noted on lists of unusual place names.

Mirror Lake, a popular hiking destination, is located on the north side of the mountain.

Both Tom Dick and Harry Mountain and Zigzag Mountain are capped by Pliocene andesite and basalt.
