= Laurel Hill (Oregon) =

Hill on the Barlow Road

Coordinates: 45.3073407°N 121.8178561°W

Laurel Hill was a hill on the Barlow Road of the Oregon Trail. It was one of the steepest descents of any on the Oregon Trail. Travelers considered it the worst part of the entire Oregon Trail, and had to either drag trees behind their wagons for braking or winch using ropes or chains. The name came from travelers mistaking rhododendrons as laurels.

The location is marked today by a historical marker on U.S. Route 26 in Oregon and a short hiking trail to the top and bottom of one of the chutes the wagons used as well as the later Mt. Hood Loop Highway.
