= Onli =

Onli is a surname. Notable people with the surname include:

- Meg Onli (born 1983), African-American art curator and writer
- Turtel Onli (1952–2025), African-American artist, author/illustrator of comic books and graphic novels

== See also ==
- Jerry Only (born 1959), American punk rock bassist and singer
