= Dufur Ranger Station =

U.S. Forest Service office in Dufur, Oregon

Coordinates: 45.4540°N 121.1254°W

The Dufur Ranger Station is a Forest Service facility located in Dufur, Oregon, which has been the site of the district office since 1892. It was built as the administrative headquarters for the Barlow Ranger District of the Mount Hood National Forest. The ranger station consists of the main office building, an office trailer, a wood working shop, a tree cooler, two warehouse structures, a gas house/paint storage building, one single family residence, and three bunkhouse units. In the 1930s this was the site of a Civilian Conservation Corps side camp, operated out of the F-9 Friend Camp.
