= The Bulletin (Norwich) =

Newspaper published in Norwich, Connecticut

- Type: Daily newspaper
- Format: Broadsheet
- Owner: USA Today Co.
- Founded: 1791
- Headquarters: 10 Railroad Place; Norwich, Connecticut 06360 United States
- Circulation: 6,560 (as of 2018)
- Website: norwichbulletin.com

The Bulletin is a daily newspaper covering eastern Connecticut, United States, based in the city of Norwich and owned by USA Today Co. The newspaper has been in continuous publication since 1796.

== History ==
The newspaper's history can be traced back to the Chelsea Courier, which began in 1796. On May 31, 1798, it was renamed to The Courier.

The Oxford English Dictionary attests the first recorded use of the term "Hello" to The Courier in 1826.

The Norwich Bulletin, a daily edition, began publishing in 1858. For several decades, The Courier and the Norwich Bulletin were published together, with the latter being published every Tuesday and Friday. During the late 19th century, the paper's editorial stance aligned with the Republican Party.

Gannett (now USA Today Co.) bought what was then called the Norwich Bulletin in November 1981. On April 12, 2007, it was announced that GateHouse Media bought the newspaper.

In 2010, the paper expanded its coverage area and began publishing two different editions, one for southeastern Connecticut and one for the northeastern part of the state. In February 2011, in an effort to reflect the paper's wide geographic range, its name was changed to The Bulletin, although its website retained the name norwichbulletin.com.

In 2025, the paper switched from carrier to postal delivery.
