= Eagle Creek, Oregon =

Unincorporated community in the state of Oregon, United States

Eagle Creek
- Unincorporated community
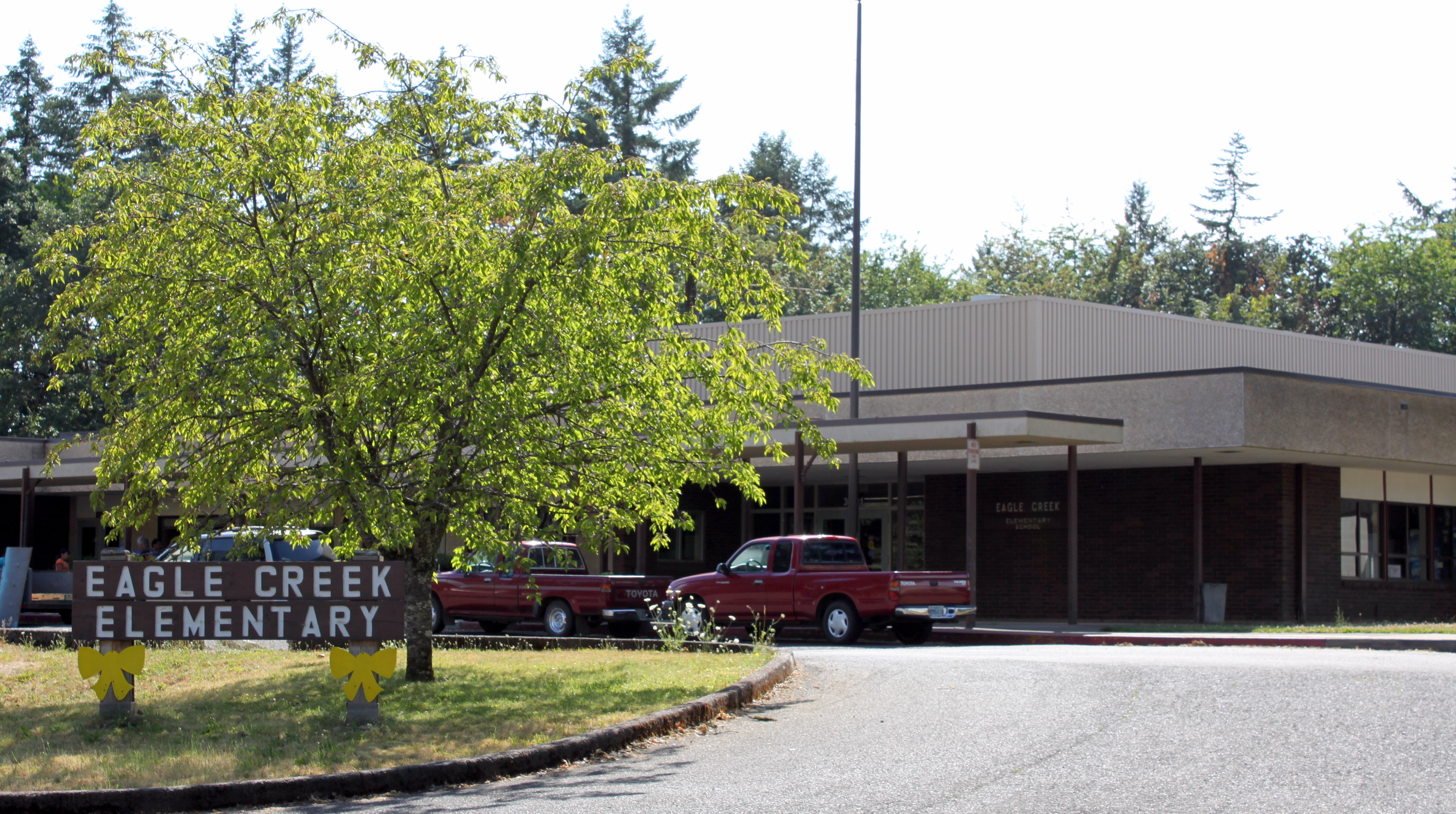
- Eagle Creek Elementary School

- Location within the state of Oregon Eagle Creek (the United States)
- Coordinates: 45°21′26″N 122°21′32″W
- Country: United States
- State: Oregon
- County: Clackamas
- Elevation: 345 ft (105 m)
- Time zone: UTC-8 (Pacific (PST))
  - Summer (DST): UTC-7 (PDT)
- ZIP code: 97022
- Area codes: 503 and 971
- GNIS feature ID: 1120258

Eagle Creek is an unincorporated community in Clackamas County, Oregon, United States. It is located seven miles southwest of Sandy, seven miles north of Estacada, and five miles southeast of Carver, at the junction of Oregon Routes 224 and 211, on the Clackamas River.

== History ==
The community was named after Eagle Creek, a local stream, which in turn was named after the large population of eagles in the area. The community was called "Eagle Creek" as early as 1844, and the post office established in 1867. Philip Foster established a farm here.

== Climate ==
This region experiences warm (but not hot) and dry summers, with no average monthly temperatures above 71.6 °F. According to the Köppen Climate Classification system, Eagle Creek has a warm-summer Mediterranean climate, abbreviated "Csb" on climate maps.

== Sports and recreation ==
The Eagle Creek Golf Course has been sold to METRO
