= Cyrus Olney =

American judge

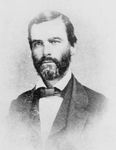

6th Justice of the Oregon Supreme Court
- In office 1853–1858
- Appointed by: Franklin Pierce
- Preceded by: William Strong
- Succeeded by: Reuben P. Boise

Personal details
- Born: October 11, 1815 Geneva, New York
- Died: December 12, 1870 (aged 55) Astoria, Oregon

Cyrus Olney (October 11, 1815 – December 12, 1870) was an American politician and lawyer in what would become the state of Oregon. He was the 6th justice of the Oregon Supreme Court serving while the region was still the Oregon Territory. A native of Ohio, Olney later was a member of the 1857 Oregon Constitutional Convention, and later served in the Oregon legislature.

== Early life ==
Cyrus Olney was born on October 11, 1815, in Geneva, New York. He was raised in Ohio, where he was educated in the public schools and later law school in Cincinnati. After passing the bar he practiced law for a time in Ohio before moving to Iowa, where he was a judge for four years.

== Oregon ==
Olney moved to Oregon and began law practice in Portland in 1851. He continued in this endeavor until 1853, when United States President Franklin Pierce appointed him to the Oregon Supreme Court. Olney remained on the court until 1858 when he resigned, though he had attempted to resign in 1853 and 1854. During this time, he also served as a delegate to the Oregon Constitutional Convention in 1857 representing Clatsop County. At the Convention he excused himself and did not vote on the final resolution. In 1866 he was elected to the Oregon House of Representatives from Clatsop, Columbia, and Tillamook counties. Serving as a Republican he was elected after a one session absence in 1870.

== Later life and family ==
Olney married twice in his lifetime. He had a total of seven children from the two marriages. Olney died on December 21, 1870 (or December 21, 1870) in Astoria at the age of 55. He had been addicted to opium and chloroform up to his death. Olney, Oregon was named for him.
