= Mount Hood Express =

Transit system in Clackamas County, Oregon

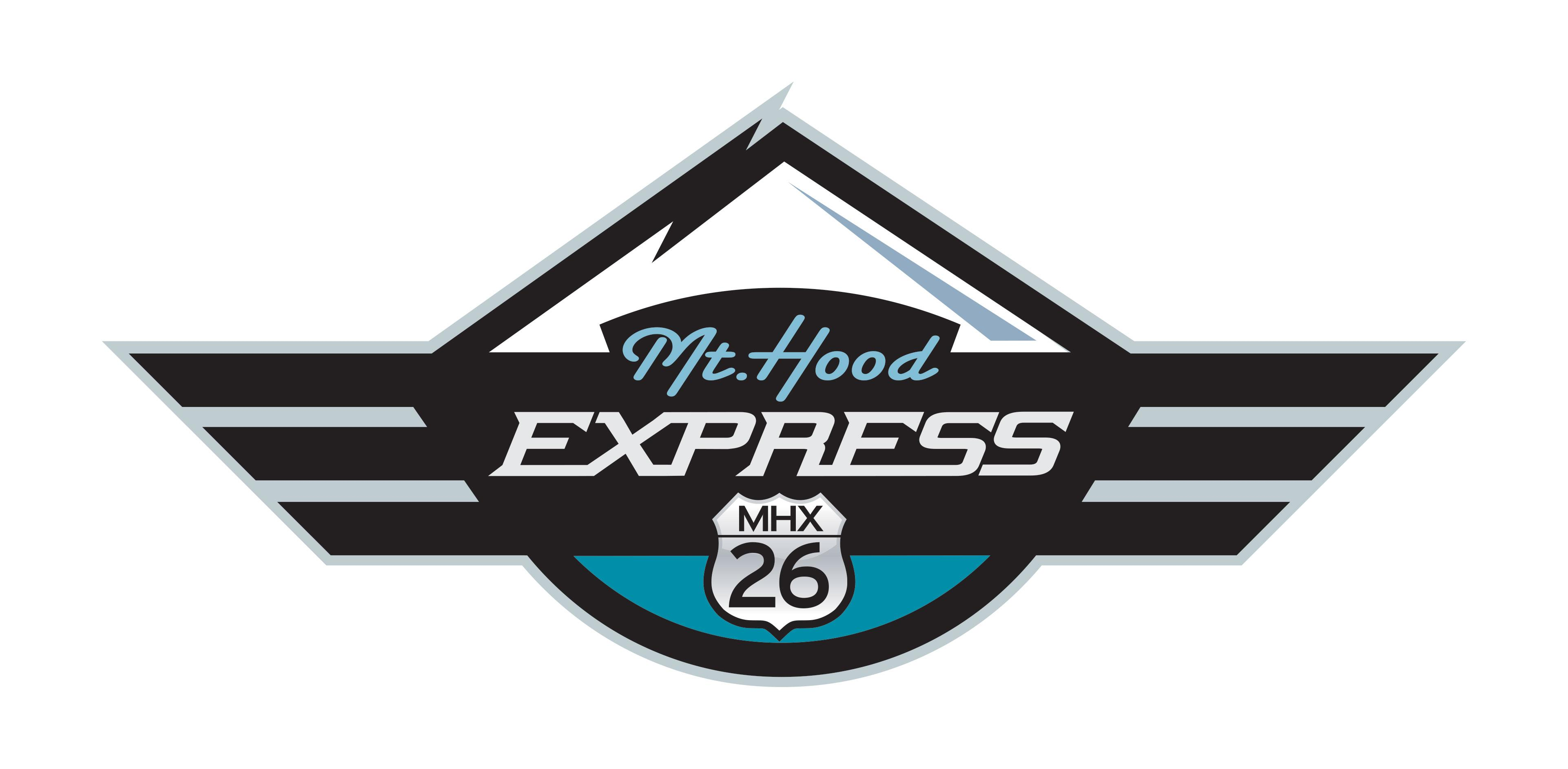
- Parent: Clackamas County Social Services
- Commenced operation: 2004 (Sandy–Rhododendron); 2013 (Sandy–Timberline)
- Locale: Mount Hood Corridor, Clackamas County, Oregon
- Annual ridership: 72,130 (2019)
- Operator: MV Transportation
- Website: www.mthoodexpress.com

The Mount Hood Express (formerly Mountain Express Bus) is a transit system serving Mount Hood Corridor communities in Clackamas County, Oregon, U.S.

The Mount Hood Express travels along Highway 26 from Sandy east to Timberline Lodge, serving multiple ski resorts and the communities of Government Camp, Rhododendron, Zigzag, Welches, Wemme, and Brightwood.

== Service ==
The Mount Hood Express operates seven days a week, providing five round trips daily between Sandy and Timberline, with an additional two-round trips during the winter recreation season, December 1 through March 31.

The Mount Hood Express is supplemented by the Villages Shuttle, which provides an additional three local service round-trips from Sandy to Rhododendron, Monday-Friday only.

At the Sandy Transit Center the Mount Hood Express interchanges with the Sandy Area Metro bus system, which can be used to connect with the Portland region transit system TriMet.

Multiple park and ride locations are available at the base of the mountain, in hopes of alleviating parking shortages at the ski resorts and reducing traffic safety concerns on the steep, twisting mountain roads.

== Funding ==
From 2004 to 2013, the Mountain Express provided transportation service along Highway 26 between Sandy and Rhododendron, funded through Oregon's business energy tax credits, a program which ended in 2013.

In 2013, the newly-renamed Mount Hood Express formed a public-private partnership with Timberline Lodge, Mount Hood Skibowl, and The Resort at The Mountain, which provided matching funds for federal lands access program grants, enabling the system to expand bus service up the mountain to Government Camp and Timberline Lodge. Also in 2013, the system received funding from the Paul Sarbanes Transit In Parks grant program to purchase new vehicles featuring specialized equipment for transporting skis and snow boards, mountain bikes and other types of recreational equipment.
