= Mount Hood Meadows =

Ski area in Oregon, United States

- Location in Oregon Mount Hood Meadows (the United States)
- Location: Mount Hood, Oregon
- Nearest city: Government Camp, Oregon
- Coordinates: 45.32889°N 121.66250°W
- Vertical: 2,777 feet (846 m)
- Top elevation: 7,300 feet (2,225 m)
- Base elevation: 4,523 feet (1,379 m)
- Skiable area: 2,150 acres (8.7 km^{2})
- Trails: 87
- Longest run: 3 miles (5 km)
- Lift system: 11 chairlifts
- Terrain parks: Yes, 4
- Snowfall: 430 inches (1,100 cm)
- Night skiing: Yes
- Website: skihood.com

Mount Hood Meadows is a ski resort on the southeastern face of Mount Hood in northern Oregon, and is the largest of the mountain's ski resorts. It is located about 67 miles (108 km) east of Portland, and 35 miles (56 km) from Hood River along Oregon Route 35. It has both Alpine and Nordic ski areas and offers night skiing, lessons and equipment rentals. There are no overnight accommodations at Mount Hood Meadows itself, but both Timberline Lodge and Cooper Spur Resort, two ski areas also on Mount Hood, offer overnight options. Additionally, many buses provide transportation to and from Mount Hood Meadows, including those run by Columbia Gorge Area Transit (CAT). There are also condos in Government Camp.

== Alpine terrain ==
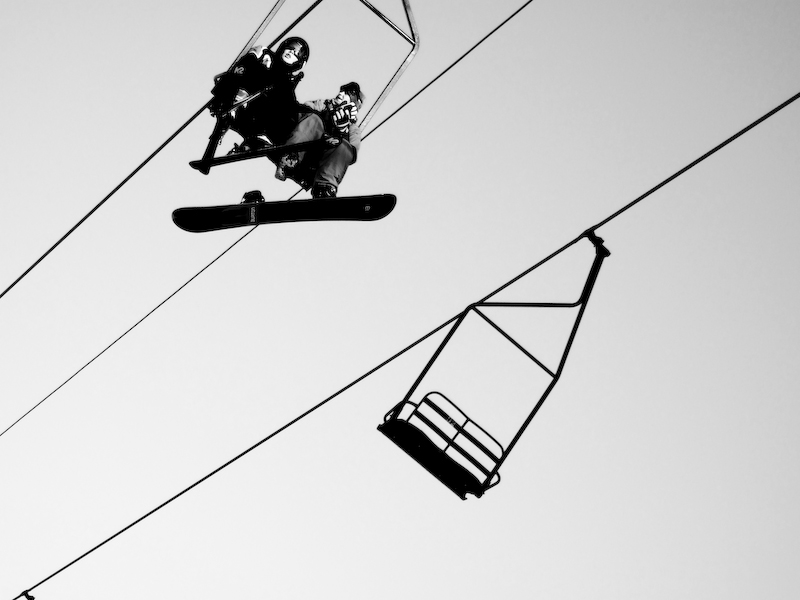
Heather Canyon chair at Mount Hood.

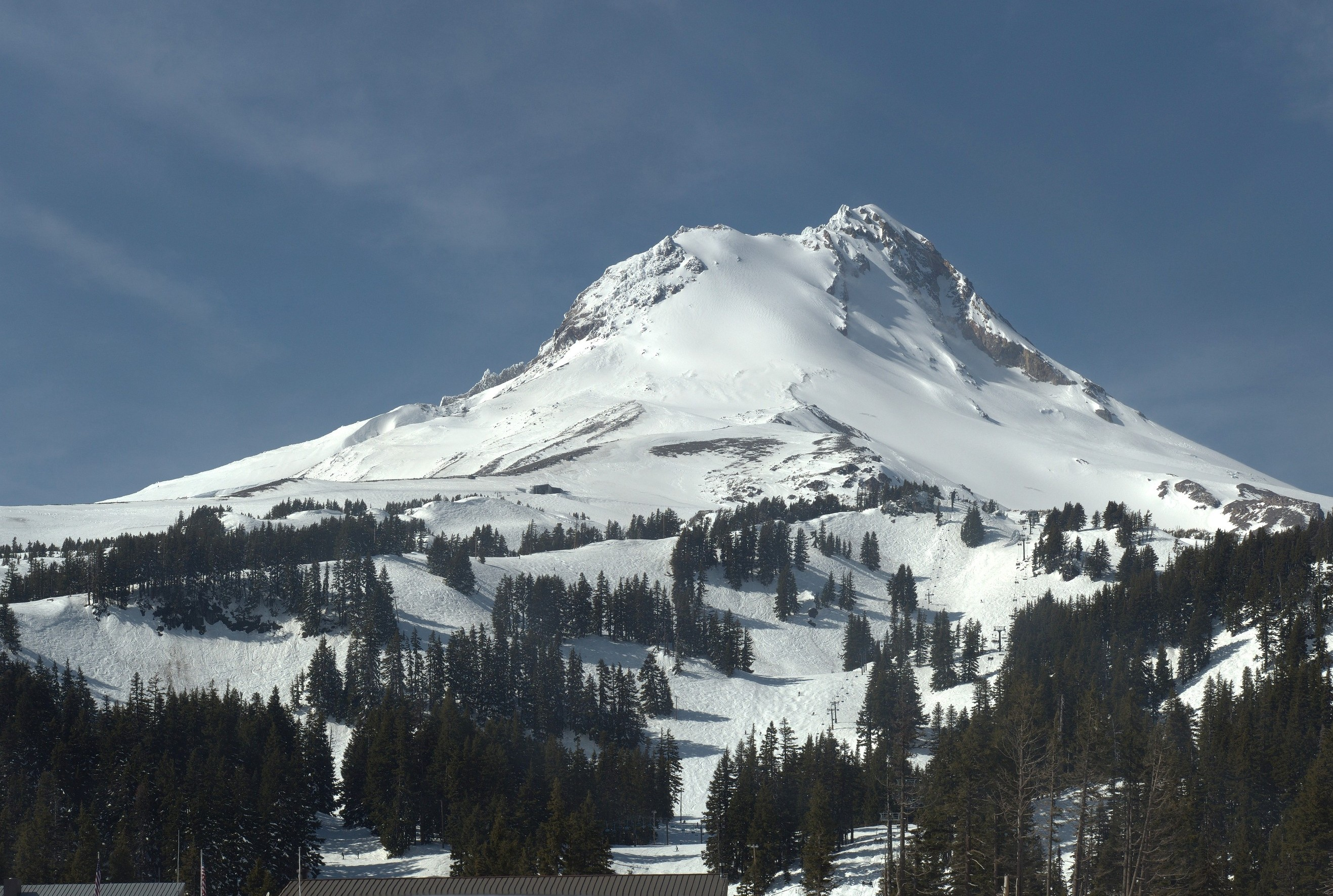
Mount Hood Meadows as seen from the main parking lot in Spring, 2009

=== Chairlifts ===
Lift Name	Vertical	Type	Ride time	make	Year constructed
Mount Hood Express	1,174 feet (358 m)	High-speed six pack	4.5 min	Leitner-Poma	2023
Hood River Express	1,400 feet (430 m)	High-speed quad	5.5 min	Poma	1995
Shooting Star Express	940 feet (290 m)	High-speed quad	5 min	Poma	1998
Cascade Express	1,391 feet (424 m)	High-speed quad	6 min	Poma	1993
Vista Express	1,121 feet (342 m)	High-speed quad	5 min	Leitner-Poma	2004
Stadium Express	581 feet (177 m)	High-speed quad	2.9 min	Leitner-Poma	2011
Blue	1,177 feet (359 m)	Double	10 min	Riblet, with Lift Engineering drive	1967
Buttercup	122 feet (37 m)	Fixed grip quad	4 min	SkyTrac	2017
Easy Rider	432 feet (132 m)	Double	7 min	Riblet	1969
Heather Canyon	705 feet (215 m)	Double	7 min	Yan	1996
Daisy	672 feet (205 m)	Double	8 min	Doppelmayr	1972

=== Trails ===
- 87 trails
- 2,150 acres (8.7 km^{2}) skiable
- 15% green (beginner)
- 40% blue (intermediate)
- 15% black diamond (advanced)
- 30% double-black diamond (expert)

=== Elevation ===
- Lowest point: 4,523 feet (1,379 m) (Hood River Meadows base area)
- Main lodge: 5,366 feet (1,636 m)
- Highest chairlift serviced point: 7,305 feet (2,227 m) (summit of Cascade Express)
- Highest point reached by hiking: 9,000 feet (2,743 m)

== Nordic terrain ==
=== Trails ===
- 9 miles (14 km)

== History ==
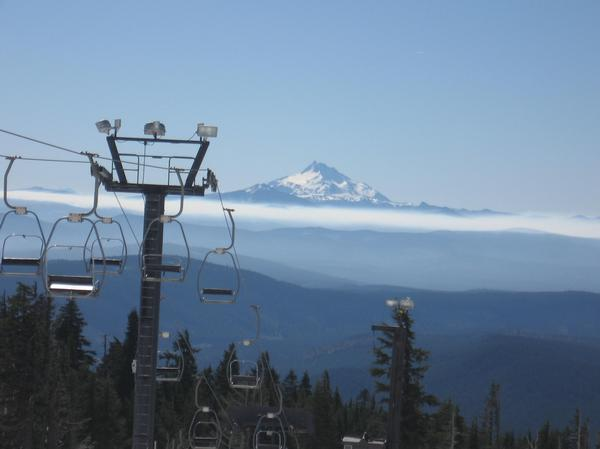
View from Timberline of Mount Jefferson about 46 miles (74 km) away

In 1964, Mount Hood National Forest announced that a feasibility study was underway for a new ski area on the east side of Mount Hood. A group of Hood River businessmen, incorporated as Hood River Meadows, Inc., had raised $3,500 to finance the study. The group included Jack L. Baldwin of Cooper Spur Ski Area, L. R. Steeves, Dr. J. Allan Henderson, and Roland B. Leavens, among others.

On February 28, 1966—after more than two years of publicity—the Forest Service accepted a bid from another group including John Gray, and former Mount Hood Skibowl shareholders William Rosenfeld, Russell McJury and Shepard Wilson. The permit was for two ski lifts, one T-bar lift, a rope tow, and a day lodge. The first runs were cleared late summer 1966 and the Forest Service built the two mile entrance road from Bennett Pass. Highway 35 was in the midst of a four-year straightening project to remove the quaint, tight curves and make winter snow removal practical. Until it was finished mid-1968, skiers had to drive through Hood River to reach the ski area. The winter of 1968–1969 was one of the deepest snow falls on record, almost burying sections of the Blue Chair.

Skiers began using the resort named Mount Hood Meadows in December 1967. Resort operators in Government Camp were uneasy due to Meadow's intense publicity and the ultra-modern facilities. This concern lasted only a few weeks, as long lift lines redistributed disenchanted guests to the other areas. The original paved parking lot had a capacity of about 330 autos, but was enlarged by 1974 to hold about a thousand.

The T bar was installed on the west side of the lodge, in the lower portion of the current Daisy chairlift. The #1 chair—now called Blue—and #2 chair—called Yellow until 2007 until being renamed "Stadium", also the name of a central run below the lift—provided access to intermediate and advanced skill terrain. It was one of the two original lifts when Mount Hood Meadows opened in January 1968. At that time, Yellow was referred to simply as "The North Lift", rising 548 vertical feet from the base area and accessing terrain in the northern portion of the ski area's permit area. The name was later changed to Yellow reinforced with painting of the chairs. For the 2007–2008 season, a new drive and chairs removed the color; a naming contest resulted in it becoming "Stadium" which hosts many ski racing events each season. The new name tributes recreational skiers and snowboarders who run gates or participate in events. #3 chair was built in 1968, now Easy Rider, was called Red before the chairs were upgraded around 1995. In 1972, the T-bar was removed to build chair #4 (now Daisy).

Chair #5, Texas, was finished August 1974 and was complicated by the deep snowpack present making it necessary to bulldoze and excavate snow to place some tower footings. In 1976, the Hood River Meadows (chair #6) double opened, providing a southeastern expansion into intermediate terrain along with a second base area. In 1988, CTEC constructed a fixed grip quad known as Shooting Star to service an expansion to the north of the Yellow chair area.

Texas was the first chairlift to be upgraded to a detachable, with the Cascade Express replacing it in 1993. The top of Cascade Express is the highest point at the area. In 1994, the Express triple chairlift, built by Doppelmayr in 1984 parallel to Blue, was upgraded and replaced by the Mount Hood Express. The Mount Hood Express reused the original lift's tower tubes.

In 1995, the Hood River Express was built to replace the Hood River Meadows lift. A year later, Hood River Meadows was reinstalled on the opposite side of the ridge as Heather Canyon, providing an egress route from expert terrain accessible off of Cascade Express and Shooting Star.

In 1998, the Shooting Star fixed grip quad was replaced with a Poma high speed quad, cutting the ride time in half.

In 2004, Leitner-Poma constructed a new high speed quad known as Vista Express to service advanced beginner and low intermediate alpine terrain on the Vista Ridge, southeast of the Cascade Express pod, and supplementing the Daisy and Easy Rider lifts.

Before the 2011–2012 season, a new high-speed quad chairlift, the Stadium Express, was constructed by Leitner-Poma to replace an older lift.

In 2012, Meadows installed RFID gates at every lift, to provide "hands free" access to guests, eliminating the guest complaint of having to show their lift ticket or pass to ticket scanners at every chairlift. In addition, twenty chairs were added to the Shooting Star lift, increasing its uphill capacity by 30%. In 2013, Meadows recommitted itself to an improved learning experience, dedicating more terrain to beginner and lower intermediate lessons. "Ice melt" was installed under the SE corner of the Paradise Sun Deck to allow efficient removal of snow.

In 2017, SkyTrac was brought in to upgrade the Buttercup double to a fixed grip quad, servicing the beginner learning terrain and transporting guests up to the Vista Express.

Construction began during the summer of 2019 on the Sahale Lodge, an expansion to the indoor space that Mount Hood Meadows had to offer. The Sahale lodge contained a new home for the gear rentals area, a second coffee bar, a food court, and a 21-and-over-only bar. It also provided more indoor and outdoor seating areas for guests to use, as well as multiple fireplaces. The Sahale Lodge was opened to the public at the beginning of the 2020–2021 season.

During the summer of 2023, the Mount Hood Express chairlift was upgraded to fit six people on each chair. It was unveiled to the public during the 2023–2024 season.
