= Wildwood, Clackamas County, Oregon =

Unincorporated community in the state of Oregon, United States

Coordinates: 45.3542856°N 121.9811918°W

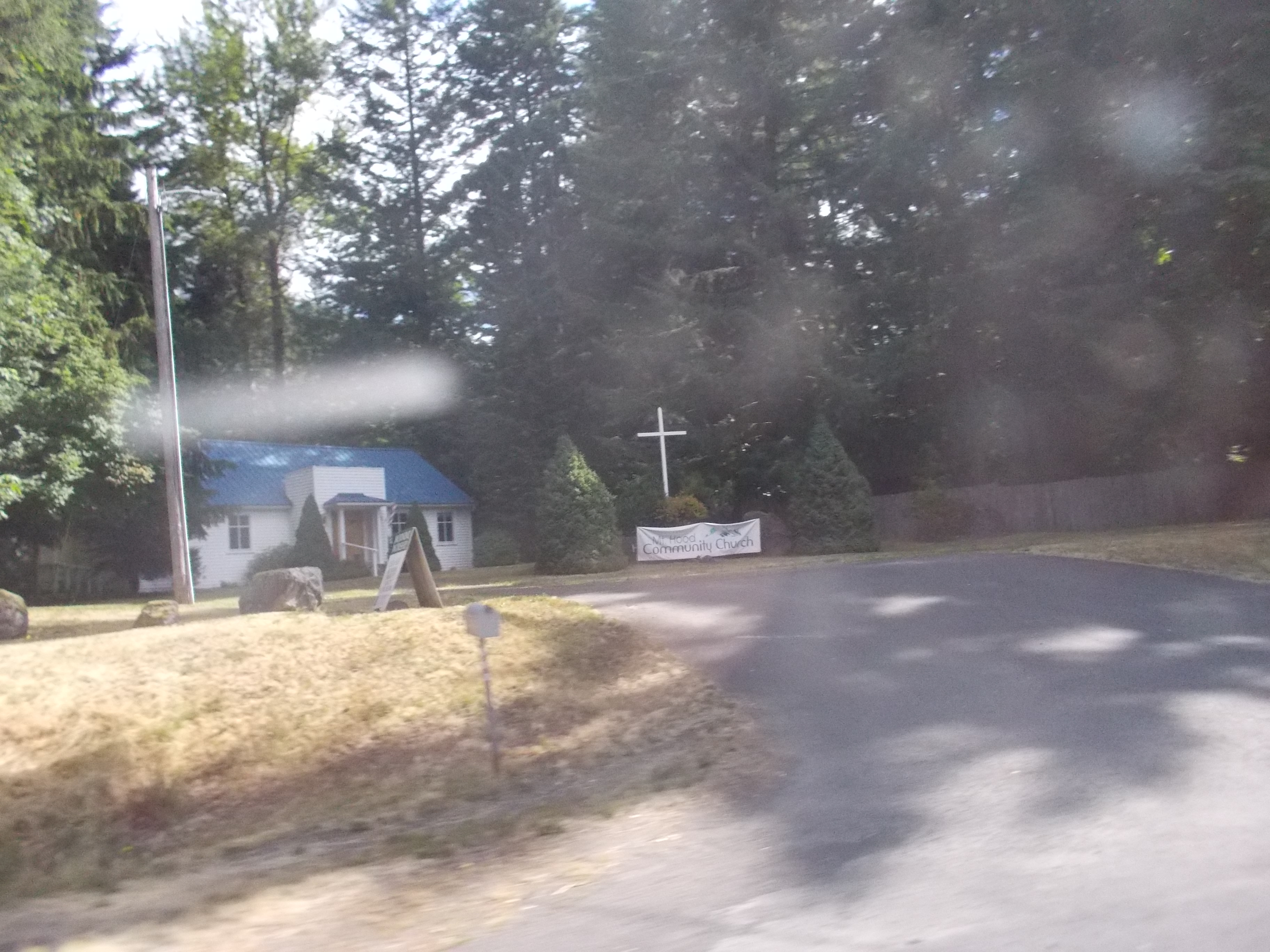
The Mount Hood Community Church between Wemme and Wildwood

Wildwood is an unincorporated community in Clackamas County, Oregon, United States. It is located in the Mount Hood Corridor about 2.5 miles southeast of Brightwood, along U.S. Route 26 near the Sandy River. Wildwood, which is outside any urban growth boundary, is located in a rural area of concentrated residential development that includes both primary and vacation residences, a few commercial facilities, including a tavern, and outdoor recreational areas, including the Wildwood Recreation Site.
