= Marmot, Oregon =

Unincorporated community in the state of Oregon, United States

Marmot
- Unincorporated community
- Location within the state of Oregon Marmot (the United States)
- Coordinates: 45°23′47″N 122°06′56″W
- Country: United States
- State: Oregon
- County: Clackamas
- Elevation: 1,273 ft (388 m)
- Time zone: UTC-8 (Pacific (PST))
  - Summer (DST): UTC-7 (PDT)
- GNIS feature ID: 1145822

Marmot is an unincorporated community in Clackamas County, Oregon, United States located in the Mount Hood Corridor. It is within the boundaries of the Villages at Mount Hood, on a ridge known as Devil's Backbone, which lies between the Sandy and Little Sandy rivers, along the historic Barlow Road (the final stretch of the Oregon Trail).

The community was named by Adolph (or Adolf) Aschoff, a German immigrant who was for many years a forester and guide in the Mount Hood area. When he settled in the area near the Sandy River in 1883, he found many animal burrows that, according to the local residents, were made by marmots. He later discovered that they were actually made by the mountain beaver, another rodent. When the post office was established in about 1886, Aschoff and two of his friends decided to name it "Marmot" on account of this error.

Construction of the Mount Hood Highway in the 1920s diverted traffic away from Marmot, and fewer visitors came to stay at Aschoff's hotel. Aschoff sold the hotel in 1930, and died soon after.

Marmot post office was discontinued in 1930. Most of the buildings burned to the ground in 1931, with the exception of Aschoff's museum, the post office, and a store. None of these structures remain today.

== See also ==
- Marmot Dam
