= Village (Oregon) =

Type of local government in Oregon, United States

A village in the U.S. state of Oregon is a model of local governance that as of 2006 only exists in Clackamas County. Like villages elsewhere, it is a subnational entity; like New York's villages, the definition is unique to a state (at the moment, to one county in a state).

Villages in Oregon are in addition to hamlets in Oregon (which were defined at the same time as villages) and to Community Planning Organizations (CPOs), which predate both villages and hamlets.

In June 2006, citizens in the Mount Hood Corridor communities of Brightwood, Wemme, Welches, Zigzag, and Rhododendron voted to become the Villages at Mount Hood, Oregon's first village. From a census perspective these communities are part of the Mount Hood Village CDP.

The residents of Boring voted against forming a village in July 2006. Government Camp, another community within the Mount Hood Corridor, is considering a village as a possible governance option.

== Definition ==
For purposes of the laws related to hamlets and villages, a "citizen" means either

- a resident at least 18 years of age living within the boundaries of a hamlet or village, or
- a non-resident who owns property or a business there.

According to Chapter 2.10 of the Clackamas County Code, a village is

an unincorporated area that is an organized forum for citizens to express issues of concern, prioritize activities, and coordinate community-based activities, as may be approved by the Board of County Commissioners (BCC). After approval by village citizens and the BCC, a village may be financed through a range of means. Villages are represented by an elected village Board, according to procedures set forth in citizen approved bylaws that also have been approved by the BCC. A village may assume the functions of a CPO upon agreement of the existing CPO, village, and BCC. Upon approval of the BCC, a village may also establish relationships with neighboring jurisdictions or organizations through Memoranda of Understanding. The County may, on behalf of a village, enter into an Intergovernmental Agreement with other governments. A village may be financed through a range of means.

A village's boundaries cannot overlap the boundaries of another hamlet, village or city.

== Process ==
To establish a village, a chief petitioner is responsible to collect the required number of citizen signatures and complete a village application form within 120 days. The petition

must be signed by at least 15% (vs. 10% for hamlets) of the citizens located within the proposed village boundary or 150 citizens (vs. 100), whichever is the lesser number, and shall state the proposed name, preliminary purpose, boundaries, number of Board members, and activities for the village.

A public hearing is then held, with a defined method of public notice beforehand. The BCC can then approve the petition as is, approve it with modifications, or reject it.

If approved, within thirty days an organizational meeting must be held by the village's citizens. The purpose of the meeting is to establish a list of candidates for the village's Board. That list must also be approved by the BCC; once approved, the citizen's meet again, to vote on their board.

Once elected, the Board defines the village's bylaws, which must also be approved by its citizens and the BCC. The Board also defines a village's plan, which defines the activities to be undertaken by the village, and which, like the bylaws, must be approved by its citizens and the BCC.

Unlike hamlets, villages have specific public alternatives available to them for financing improvements in services and facilities within the village. Subject to state and county law, funding can be based on a tax, fees, local improvement district, or other service district. New taxes require approval in an election that the BCC orders on the village's behalf.

The ordinance defining villages defines similar processes for other aspects of villages, such as their dissolution. In particular, board members acting within their authority as defined by bylaws and county policy are treated as agents of the county for claims made against the organization, officer or member for the purposes of the Oregon Tort Claims Act.

== See also ==
- Hamlets in Oregon

== Sources ==
- Gragg, Randy (May 11, 2007). "It Takes a Village to Raise a Voice". The Oregonian. pp. B1, B5.
