= Mountain Air Park, Oregon =

Unincorporated community in the state of Oregon, United States

- Unincorporated community
- Location within Oregon Location within the United States
- Coordinates: 45°21′32″N 121°59′26″W
- Country: United States
- State: Oregon
- County: Clackamas
- Elevation: 1,211 ft (369 m)
- Time zone: UTC-8 (Pacific (PST))
  - Summer (DST): UTC-7 (PDT)
- ZIP code: 97011
- Area codes: 503 and 971
- GNIS feature ID: 1146536

Mountain Air Park is an unincorporated community in Clackamas County, Oregon, United States, served by the Brightwood, Oregon 97011 post office. It is on Mount Hood Highway 26 northwest of Mount Hood Village, Oregon near Wildwood Recreation Site.
