= Mount Hood Corridor =

Area of Oregon, United States

Coordinates: 45.35°N 122.00°W

The Mount Hood Corridor is a part of Oregon between Sandy and Government Camp, in Clackamas County. It is named after Mount Hood and has served travelers going in both directions since the days of Native Americans and Oregon Trail migrants. The area between Alder Creek and Government Camp is sometimes known as Hoodland.

It includes the following communities (from east to west):

- Government Camp
- Rhododendron
- Faubion
- Zigzag
- Welches
- Wemme
- Wildwood
- Mountain Air Park
- Salmon
- Brightwood
- Alder Creek
- Marmot
- Cherryville
- Firwood
- Several other small communities and rural neighborhoods
- Sandy (incorporated city)

The modern-day corridor includes part of the historic Barlow Road and a good-sized portion of the Mount Hood Scenic Byway. U.S. Route 26 runs through the corridor, sometimes alongside the Sandy River.

For the United States 2000 Census, much of the corridor was consolidated into a single Mount Hood Village CDP. In December 2005, the communities from Rhododendron to Marmot applied to Clackamas County seeking to form a village called the Villages at Mount Hood.

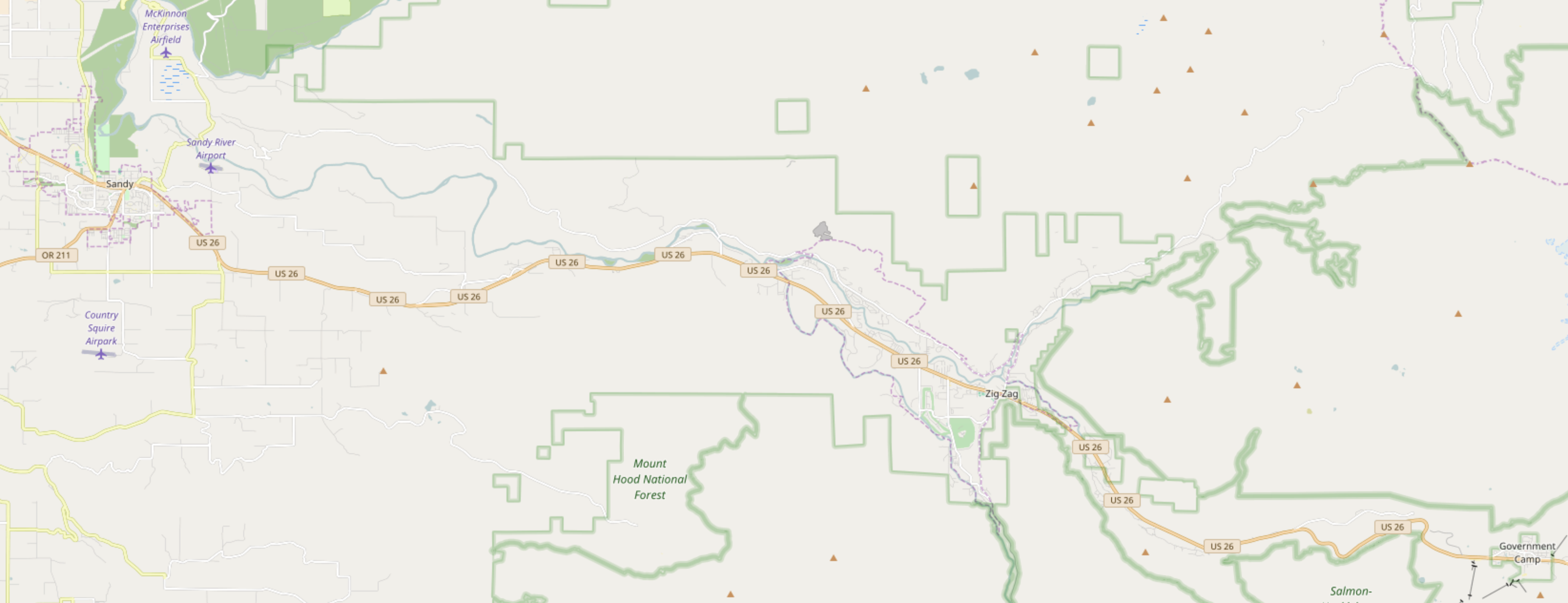
