= Faubion, Oregon =

Unincorporated community in the state of Oregon, United States

- Unincorporated community
- Location within Oregon
- Coordinates: 45°20′35″N 121°56′06″W
- Country: United States
- State: Oregon
- County: Clackamas
- Elevation: 1,450 ft (440 m)
- Time zone: UTC-8 (Pacific (PST))
  - Summer (DST): UTC-7 (PDT)
- ZIP code: 97049
- GNIS feature ID: 1142031

Faubion is an unincorporated community in Clackamas County, Oregon, United States. It is located about 2 miles northwest of Rhododendron, in the Mount Hood Corridor on a loop road off U.S. Route 26 near the Zigzag River.

Faubion post office was established in 1925 and was named for a family of local settlers, including William J. Faubion, who was the first postmaster. The office closed in 1937 and mail was then handled by the Zigzag post office. William Faubion built a store, out of which the post office was later run, and the La Casa Monte Inn.
