= Adolph Aschoff =

American homesteader (1849–1930)

Adolph Aschoff (May 21, 1849–1930) was a homesteader in the U.S. state of Oregon in the late 19th century. He established the community of Marmot, Oregon in the western foothills of Mount Hood in the late 19th century. Most of the buildings burned down in 1931.

== Oregon ==
Aschoff met and married Dorotea Gein in Rush County, Kansas, before moving to Oregon in 1878, where he settled in the Mount Tabor area and raised and sold vegetables around town. In March 1880, Aschoff and his family went to the Marmot area, where they purchased 140 acres (0.57 km^{2}). Aschoff built a resort known as the Aschoff Mountain Home.

Aschoff was a ranger, promoted in June 1904 to supervisor, of the newly established Cascade Range National Forest.

On July 4, 1931, the Mountain Home and all the surrounding buildings burned to the ground; The museum, post office, and store on the south side of the road were spared, though they no longer remain.
