= Stafford, Oregon =

Unincorporated community in Oregon, United States

- Hamlet and census-designated place
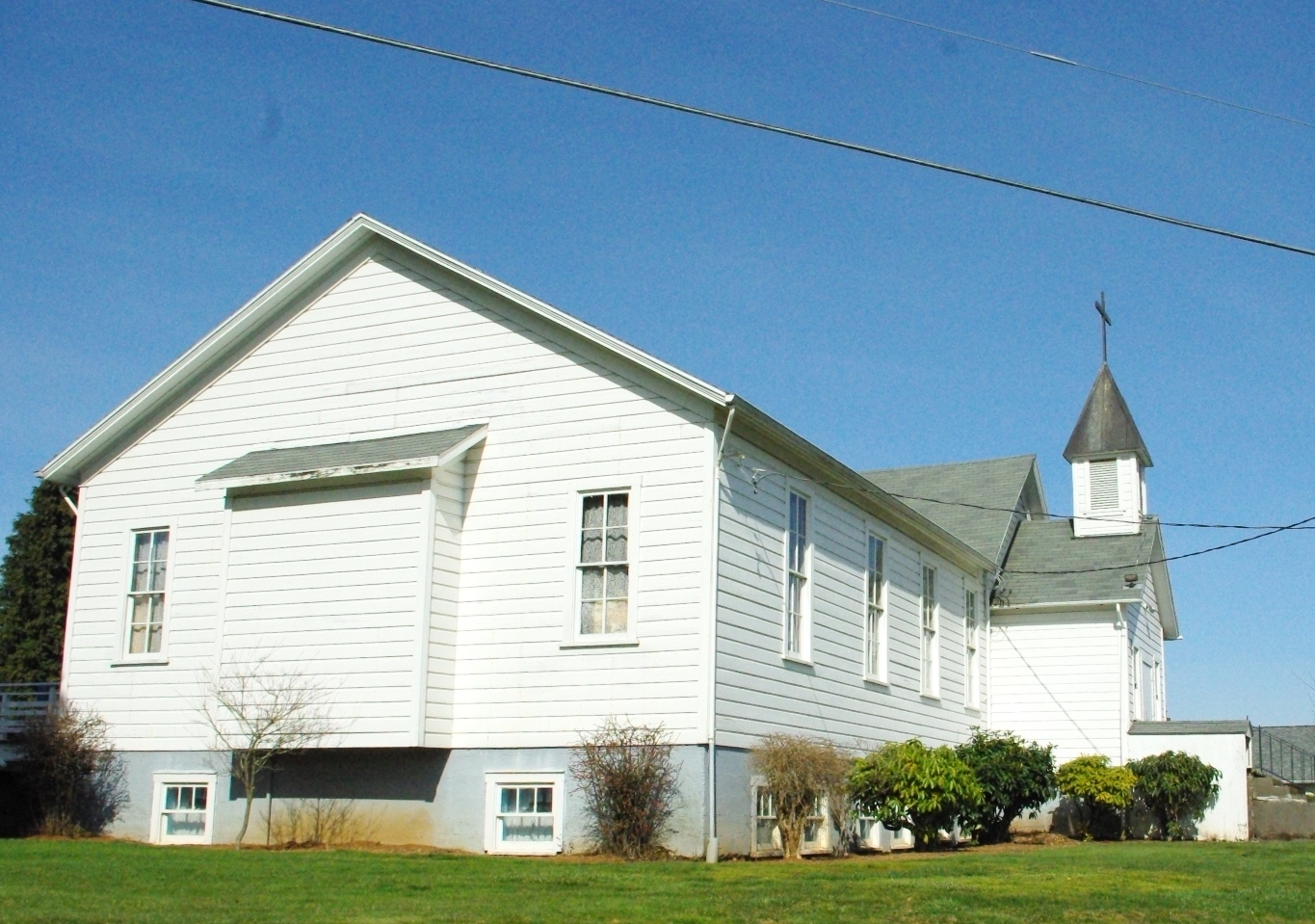
- Baptist church in Stafford

- Location within the state of Oregon Stafford (the United States)
- Coordinates: 45°22′40″N 122°40′55″W
- Country: United States
- State: Oregon
- County: Clackamas

Area
  - Total: 6.33 sq mi (16.39 km^{2})
  - Land: 6.27 sq mi (16.24 km^{2})
  - Water: 0.058 sq mi (0.15 km^{2})
- Elevation: 194 ft (59 m)

Population (2020)
  - Total: 1,895
  - Density: 302.1/sq mi (116.66/km^{2})
- Time zone: UTC-8 (Pacific (PST))
  - Summer (DST): UTC-7 (PDT)
- ZIP code: 97062, 97068
- Area codes: 503 and 971
- FIPS code: 41-69800
- GNIS feature ID: 2584424

Stafford is an unincorporated community, classified by the county as a hamlet, in Clackamas County, Oregon, United States. It is a census-designated place (CDP). As of the 2020 census, Stafford had a population of 1,895. The community covers approximately 15.7 km^{2} (3,900 acres) located in a rough triangle south of Lake Oswego, east of Tualatin, and west of West Linn. Students in the area attend the schools of the West Linn-Wilsonville School District.

== History ==
Stafford was named by George A. Steel, a prominent Portland pioneer, after his hometown of Stafford, Ohio, in the 1860s. The Stafford School opened in the community in 1892, and the following year the Eastside Electric Railway owned by Steel reached the area. Stafford post office operated from 1878 to 1905.

Parts of the Stafford area were proposed to be added to the Portland area's urban growth boundary in 1995. Eventually 830 acres (3.4 km^{2}) were added, but later removed after a court fight that ended in 2001 at the Oregon Court of Appeals. In November 2006, the residents of Stafford voted 344–30 to form a hamlet, the second Oregon community to do so (after Beavercreek).

=== Wankers Corner ===
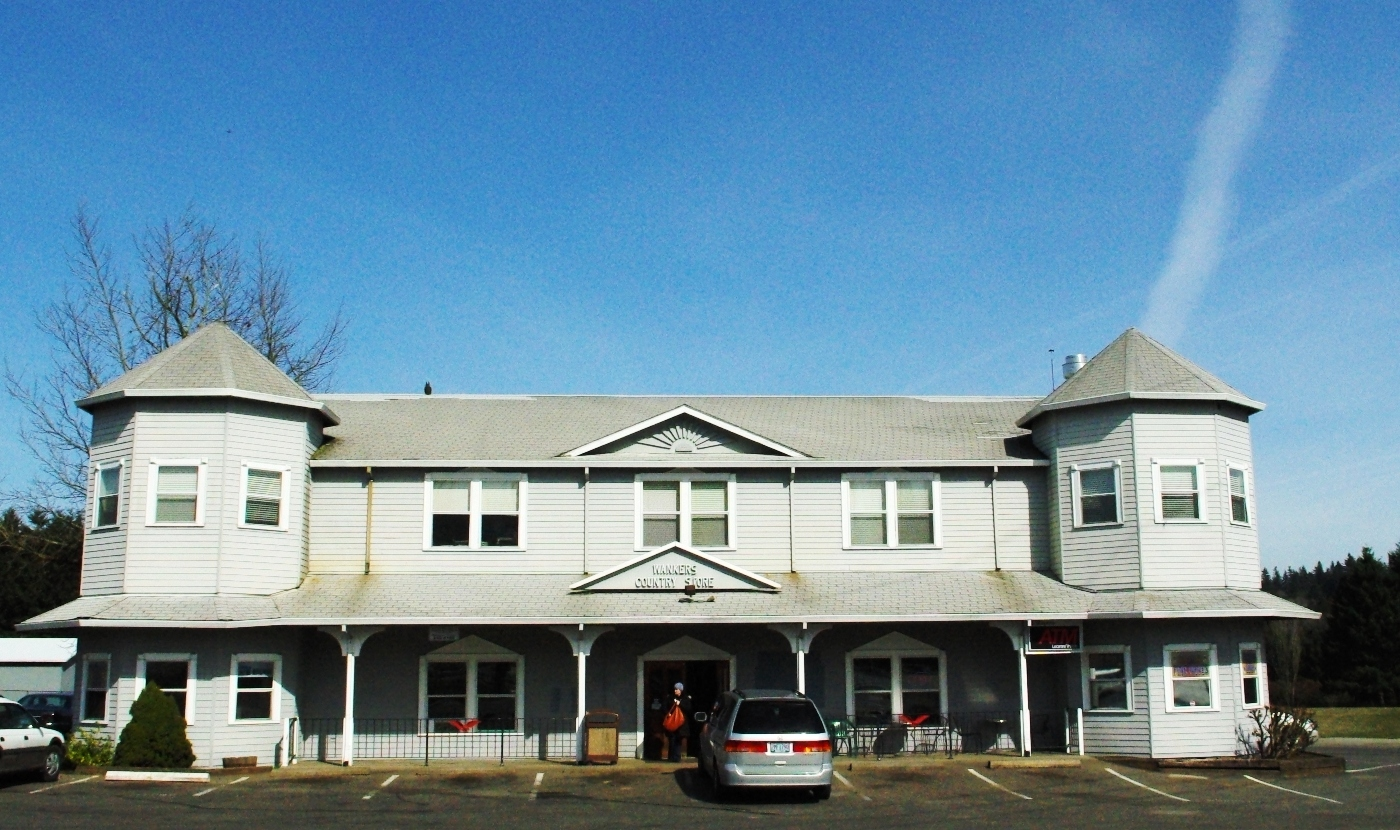
Wanker's Country Store

In 1895, the Wanker family moved to the area, bought land, and built a store and tavern at the intersection of Stafford and Borland roads. The intersection came to be known as Wankers Corner. Wanker is a German surname (pronounced Wonker), but because the word "wanker" is also a slang term for "masturbator" in British English, Wankers Corner has frequently been noted on lists of unusual place names.

== Demographics ==
Historical population
Census	Pop.	Note	%±
2020	1,895		—
U.S. Decennial Census

== Education ==
Most of the CDP is in the West Linn School District 3J.

Portions of the CDP are in the Lake Oswego School District 7J. Some areas are zoned to Hallinan Elementary School while others are zoned to Westridge Elementary School. Those places feed into Lakeridge Middle School and Lakeridge High School.
