= Mount Hood Village, Oregon =

Unincorporated community in the state of Oregon, United States

- Census-designated place
- Coordinates: 45°22′42″N 121°53′12″W
- Country: United States
- State: Oregon
- County: Clackamas

Area
  - Total: 26.1 sq mi (67.7 km^{2})
  - Land: 26.1 sq mi (67.7 km^{2})
  - Water: 0 sq mi (0.0 km^{2})
- Elevation: 1,506 ft (459 m)

Population (2010)
  - Total: 4,864
  - Density: 186/sq mi (71.8/km^{2})
- Time zone: UTC-8 (Pacific (PST))
  - Summer (DST): UTC-7 (PDT)
- ZIP code: 97067
- Area codes: 503 and 971
- FIPS code: 41-50235
- GNIS feature ID: 2408877
- Website: http://www.clackamas.us/citizenin/mthood.html

Mount Hood Village is the name of a census-designated place (CDP) within the Mount Hood Corridor in Clackamas County, Oregon, United States. As of the 2010 census, the CDP had a population of 4,864. The Villages at Mount Hood is the name of the combined government of several of the communities encompassed by the CDP and is a separate entity.

== Government ==
The Villages at Mount Hood is the common quasi-government of the unincorporated communities of the Mount Hood Corridor, and includes Brightwood, Welches, Wemme, Zigzag, and Rhododendron. Residents approved its formation in May 2006.

The Villages at Mount Hood was the first established village under Clackamas County's "Complete Communities" ordinance, which allows unincorporated communities to form quasi-governments that allow them to have more direct control regarding the issues and activities that affect them.

According to the village's official website, the communities united to form the village because the Oregon Department of Transportation required that the towns create a "governmental agency" in order to continue getting grants for the growing Mount Hood Express bus system. The "Complete Communities" ordinance makes villages and hamlets official agencies of the county.

== Geography ==
The CDP includes most of Brightwood, Wemme, Welches, Zigzag, and Rhododendron. Most of the area is immediately north or south of U.S. Route 26, though a spur south into parts of Welches and a spur north along East Lolo Pass Road is also included.

According to the United States Census Bureau, the CDP has a total area of 26.1 square miles (67.7 km^{2}), all land.

== Demographics ==
As of the census of 2000, there were 3306 people in the CDP, organized into 1320 households and 872 families. The population density was 482.5 inhabitants per square mile (186.3/km^{2}). There were 1903 housing units at an average density of 277.7 per square mile (107.2/km^{2}). The racial makeup of the CDP was 92.38% White, 1.66% Native American, 0.48% Asian, 0.33% Black or African American, 0.03% Pacific Islander, 2.90% from other races, and 2.21% from two or more races. 6.35% of the population were Hispanic or Latino of any race.

There were 1,320 households, out of which 29.5% had children under the age of 18 living with them, 55.8% were married couples living together, 6.1% had a female householder with no husband present, and 33.9% were non-families. 24.6% of all households were made up of individuals, and 6.7% had someone living alone who was 65 years of age or older. The average household size was 2.46 and the average family size was 2.95.

The median age in the CDP was 40 years:

- 24.5% under the age of 18,
- 7.1% from 18 to 24,
- 29.2% from 25 to 44,
- 28.5% from 45 to 64, and
- 10.7% who were 65 years of age or older.

For every 100 females, there were 113.6 males. For every 100 females age 18 and over, there were 109.1 males.

The median income for a household in the CDP was $51,031, and the median income for a family was $59,458. Males had a median income of $42,961 versus $28,372 for females. The per capita income for the CDP was $24,604. 6.4% of the population and 3.9% of families were below the poverty line. Out of the total population, 2.6% of those under the age of 18 and 6.5% of those 65 and older were living below the poverty line.
