= Welches, Oregon =

Unincorporated community in the state of Oregon, United States

Welches
- Unincorporated community
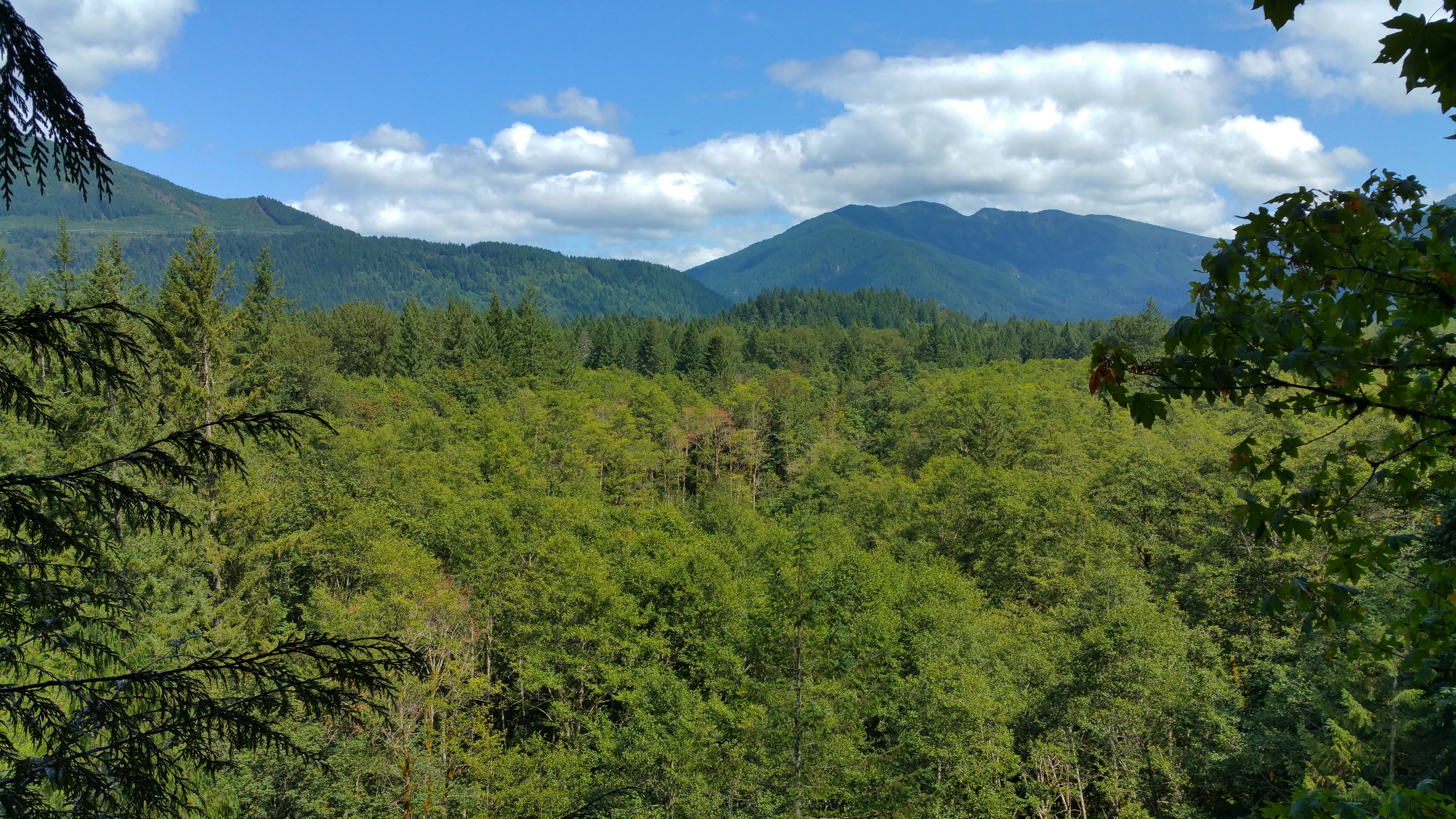
- Wildwood Recreation Site in Welches

- Location within the state of Oregon Welches (the United States)
- Coordinates: 45°19′41″N 121°57′39″W
- Country: United States
- State: Oregon
- County: Clackamas
- Elevation: 1,299 ft (396 m)
- Time zone: UTC-8 (Pacific (PST))
  - Summer (DST): UTC-7 (PDT)
- ZIP code: 97067
- GNIS feature ID: 1152002

Welches is an unincorporated community in Clackamas County, Oregon, United States. It is located within the Mount Hood Corridor between Zigzag and Wemme along U.S. Route 26. It is one of the many communities that make up the Villages at Mount Hood.

== History ==
The community was named after Samuel Welch, a homesteader from Virginia who settled near Welches Creek in 1882 with his son, William, after the death of Samuel's wife. Samuel Welch died in 1898.

A post office was established in the village in 1905, and in 1909, a hotel was constructed, that ran until 1917; the hotel was eventually replaced by nine cottages. Today a hotel and golf resort is located in the village, complete with croquet courts. Welches is home to the Hoodland library, operated by the city of Sandy.

== Gallery ==
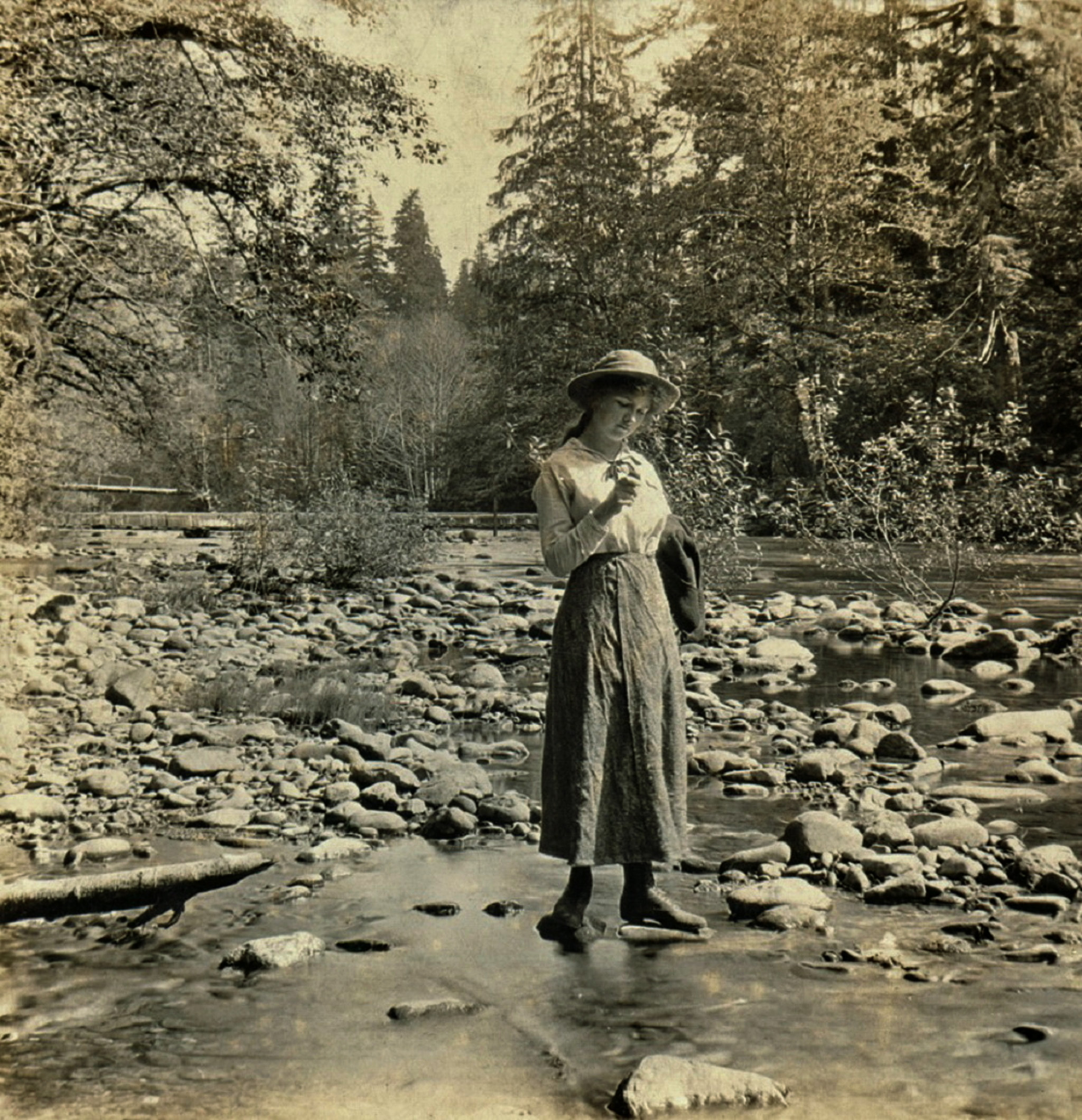
A woman on the Salmon River in Welches c. 1915

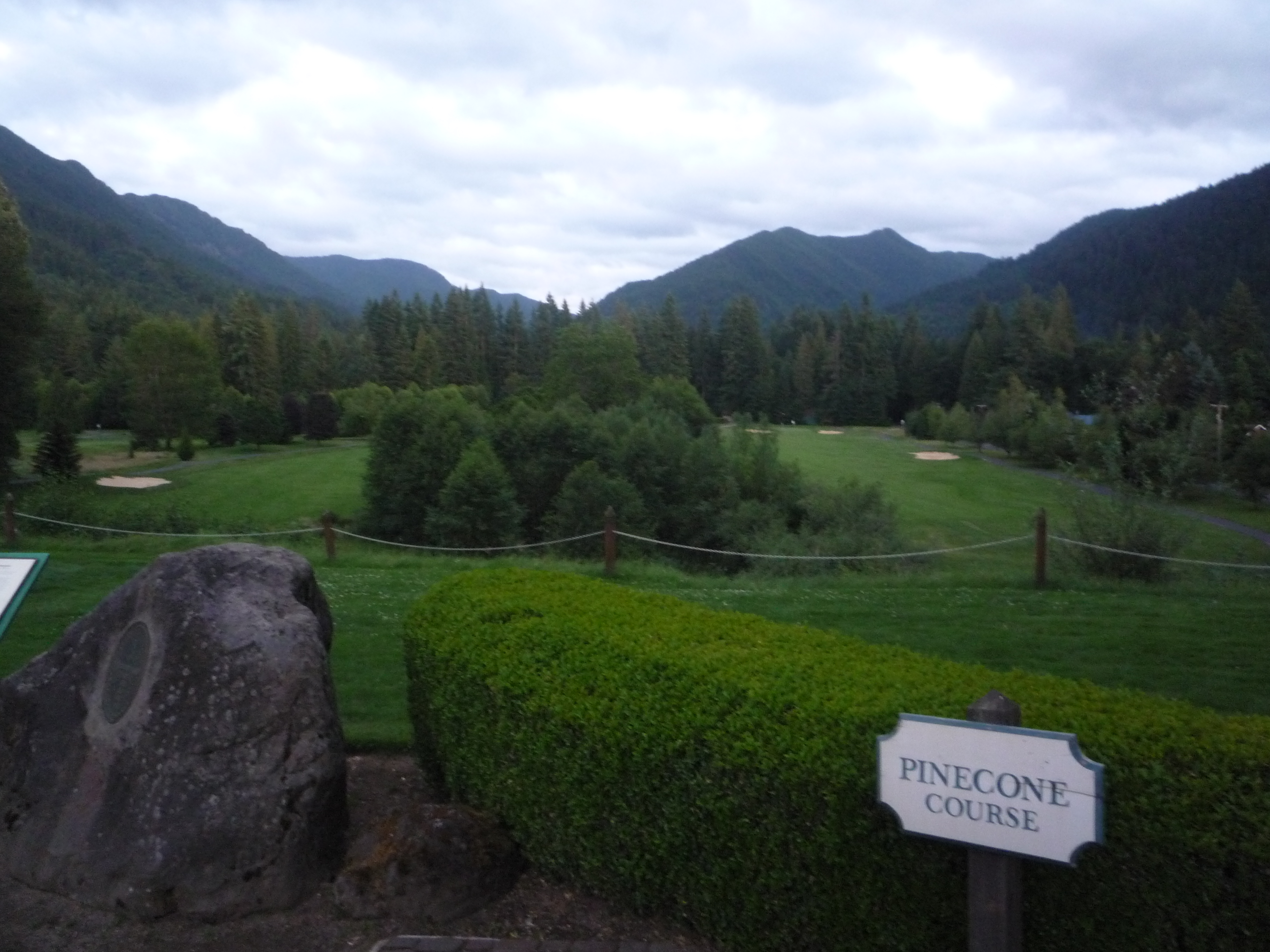
The Welches golf course

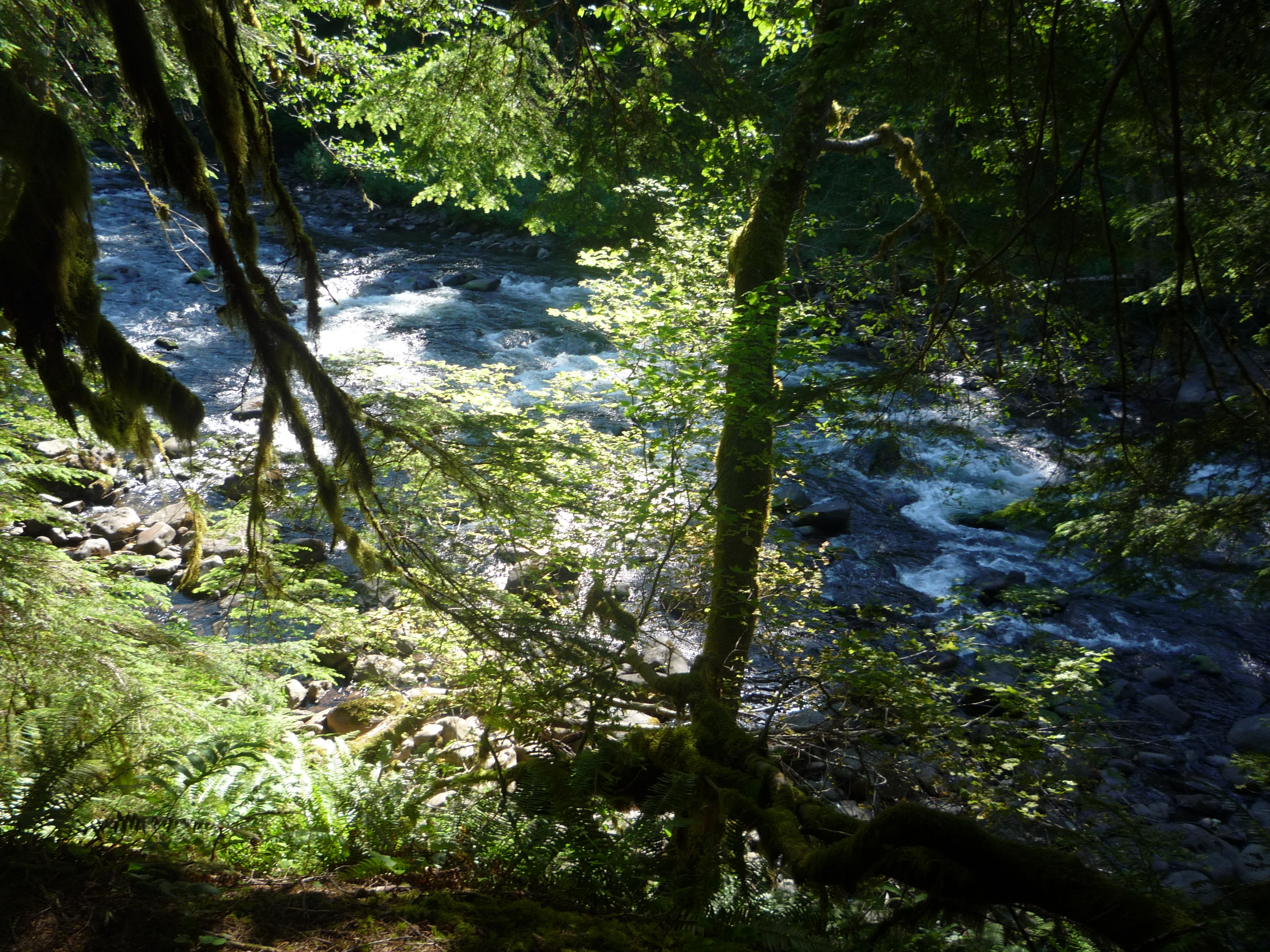
Salmon River in Welches

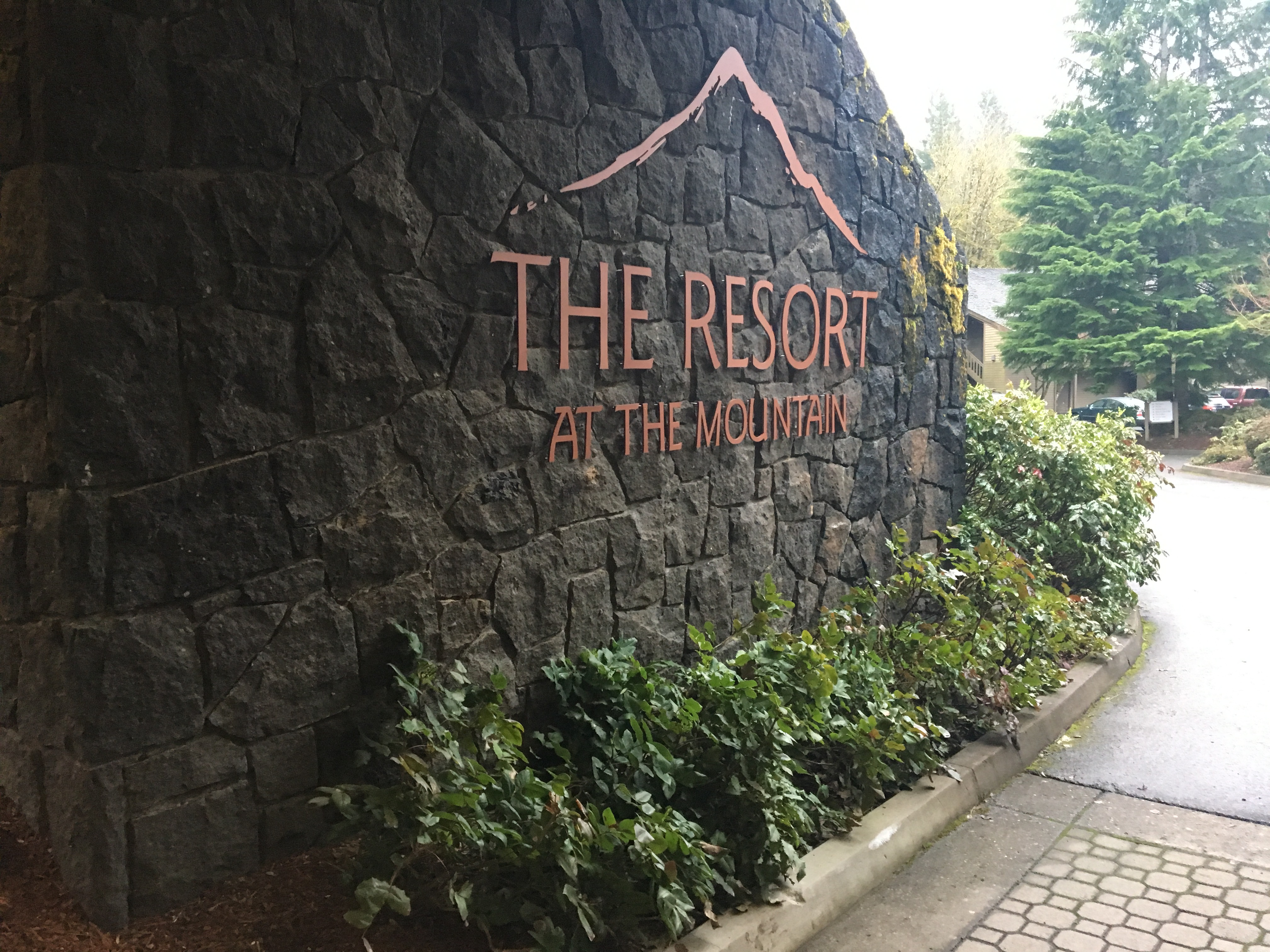
Resort at the Mountain

== See also ==
- Mount Hood Village CDP
- Village (Oregon)
- Library Information Network of Clackamas County (background on the Hoodland library)
