= Hamlet (Oregon) =

Type of local government in Oregon, United States

A hamlet is a model of local governance in Clackamas County in the U.S. state of Oregon. Like hamlets elsewhere, it is a county subdivision; like New York's hamlets, the definition is unique to a state (in this case, to one county in a state).

Hamlets in Oregon are in addition to villages in Oregon (which were defined at the same time as hamlets) and to Community Planning Organizations (CPOs), which predate both hamlets and villages.

To date, there are three hamlets: Beavercreek, Mulino, and Stafford.

== Definition ==
For purposes of the laws related to hamlets and villages, a "citizen" means either

- a resident who is 18 years or older living within the boundaries of a hamlet or village, or
- a non-resident who owns property or a business there.

According to Chapter 2.10 of the Clackamas County Code, a hamlet is

an unincorporated area that is an organized forum for citizens to express issues of concern, prioritize activities, and coordinate community-based activities, as may be approved by the Board of County Commissioners (BCC). A hamlet is financed primarily through contributions and fundraising activities.

Hamlets are represented by an elected hamlet Board, according to procedures set forth in citizen-approved bylaws that also have been approved by the BCC. A hamlet may assume the functions of a CPO upon agreement of the existing CPO, hamlet, and BCC. Upon approval of the BCC, a hamlet may also establish relationships with neighboring jurisdictions or organizations through Memoranda of Understanding. The County may, on behalf of a hamlet, enter into an Intergovernmental Agreement with other governments. Hamlets are not direct providers of services and are not empowered to generate taxes or fees.

A hamlet's boundaries cannot overlap the boundaries of another hamlet, village or city.

== Process ==
To establish a hamlet, a chief petitioner is responsible to collect the required number of citizen signatures and complete a hamlet application form within 120 days. The petition:

must be signed by at least 10% of the citizens located within the proposed hamlet boundary or 100 citizens, whichever is the lesser number, and
shall state the proposed name, preliminary purpose, boundaries, number of Board members, and activities for the hamlet.

A public hearing is then held, with a defined method of public notice beforehand. The BCC can then approve the petition as is, approve it with modifications, or reject it.

If approved, within thirty days an organizational meeting must be held by the hamlet's citizens. The purpose of the meeting is to establish a list of candidates for the hamlet's Board. That list must also be approved by the BCC; once approved, the citizen's meet again, to vote on their board.

Once elected, the Board defines the hamlet's bylaws, which must also be approved by its citizens and the BCC. The Board also defines a hamlet's plan, which defines the activities to be undertaken by the hamlet, and which, like the bylaws, must be approved by its citizens and the BCC.

The ordinance defining hamlets defines similar processes for other aspects of hamlets, such as their dissolution. In particular, Board members acting within their authority as defined by bylaws and county policy are treated as agents of the county for claims made against the organization, officer or member for the purposes of the Oregon Tort Claims Act.

== See also ==
- Villages in Oregon
