= Firwood, Clackamas County, Oregon =

Unincorporated community in the state of Oregon, United States

Coordinates: 45.3734536°N 122.2236969°W

Firwood is an unincorporated community in Clackamas County, Oregon, United States. It is located about 3 miles southeast of Sandy just off U.S. Route 26. The junction of U.S. 26 and Firwood Road is known as Shortys Corner.

Firwood is a descriptive name for the Douglas and true firs in the area. Firwood post office was established in 1895 and closed in 1906. Today Firwood has a Sandy mailing address. Firwood Elementary School is part of the Oregon Trail School District.
