= Government Camp, Oregon =

- Census-designated place
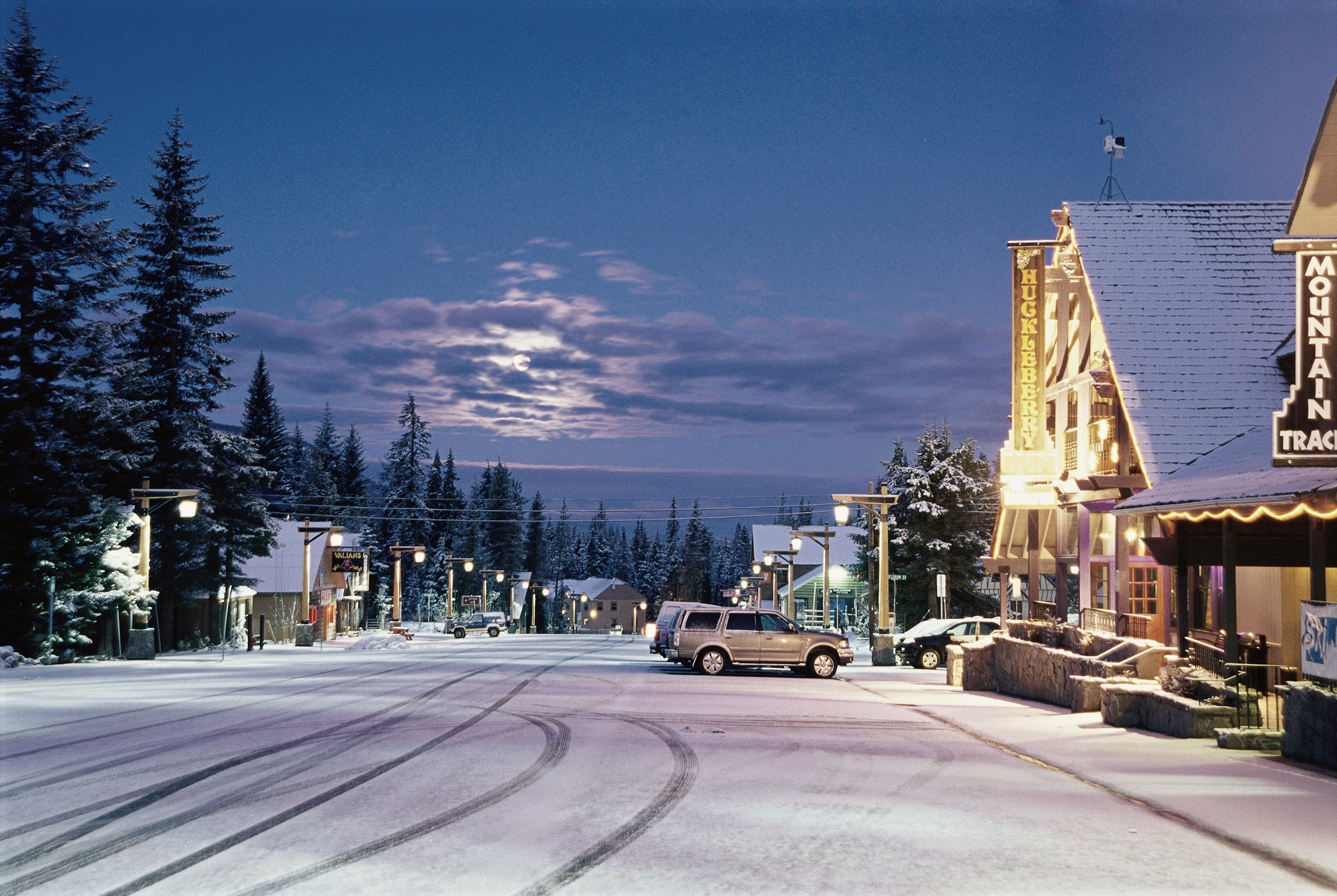
- Center of business district in Government Camp

- Location within the state of Oregon Government Camp (the United States)
- Coordinates: 45°18′08″N 121°45′09″W
- Country: United States
- State: Oregon
- County: Clackamas

Area
  - Total: 0.75 sq mi (1.94 km^{2})
  - Land: 0.75 sq mi (1.94 km^{2})
  - Water: 0 sq mi (0.00 km^{2})
- Elevation: 3,891 ft (1,186 m)

Population (2020)
  - Total: 179
  - Density: 239.5/sq mi (92.46/km^{2})
- Time zone: UTC-8 (Pacific (PST))
  - Summer (DST): UTC-7 (PDT)
- ZIP code: 97028
- FIPS code: 41-30250
- GNIS feature ID: 2584415

Government Camp // is an unincorporated community and census-designated place located in Clackamas County, Oregon, United States, on the base of Mount Hood and north of Tom Dick and Harry Mountain. It is the only town within 5 miles (8 km) of Mount Hood and therefore is the de facto "mountain town" or "ski town". It is the gateway to several ski resorts, with the most popular being Timberline Lodge and Mount Hood Skibowl. Government Camp also has its own, smaller ski resort, Summit Pass.

The community is located within the Mount Hood Corridor on U.S. Route 26 (the Mount Hood Highway), near its intersection with Oregon Route 35 and the Barlow Pass summit of the Cascade Range. As of the 2020 census, Government Camp had a population of 179. The government's 2016 estimate indicated a population of 121 persons.

== Demographics ==
Historical population
Census	Pop.	Note	%±
2020	179		—
U.S. Decennial Census

== History ==
Government Camp was given its name by settlers traveling the Barlow Road, who discovered several wagons abandoned there by the Regiment of Mounted Riflemen. A sign in front of the town's post office states, "Formerly a camp on the old Barlow Road, the village was named in 1849 when U.S Cavalry troops were forced to abandon wagons and supplies here."

== Government ==
Over the last decade, Government Camp went through a revitalization effort due to a Clackamas County urban renewal district. With that district expiring in 2007, the community had been looking at ways to maintain current services. At a town hall meeting on November 17, 2006, citizens voted 41–58 not to form a village. Many residents voted against the proposal in order to seek incorporation. In May 2010, residents of the community voted on incorporation, but the measure failed by a vote of 48 against incorporation and 35 in favor of incorporation. Had the city been formed, the city would have had 138 registered voters within the city limits at the time of formation.

== Climate ==
Government Camp's climate is borderline between the dry summer version of a humid continental climate and the extremely rare dry summer versions of a subarctic climate and subpolar oceanic climate (Köppen classification Dsb, Dsc, or Csc), with cool, dry summers and cold, very wet winters with huge snowfall due to the powerful Aleutian Low.

Climate data for Government Camp, Oregon (1991–2020 normals, extremes 1951–present)
Month	Jan	Feb	Mar	Apr	May	Jun	Jul	Aug	Sep	Oct	Nov	Dec	Year
Record high °F (°C)	70 (21)	69 (21)	70 (21)	80 (27)	93 (34)	98 (37)	99 (37)	105 (41)	94 (34)	83 (28)	70 (21)	65 (18)	105 (41)
Mean maximum °F (°C)	54.0 (12.2)	52.8 (11.6)	58.2 (14.6)	66.1 (18.9)	74.6 (23.7)	79.6 (26.4)	85.7 (29.8)	87.0 (30.6)	82.8 (28.2)	72.2 (22.3)	59.3 (15.2)	49.3 (9.6)	89.0 (31.7)
Mean daily maximum °F (°C)	37.1 (2.8)	37.8 (3.2)	41.0 (5.0)	45.1 (7.3)	53.7 (12.1)	59.3 (15.2)	69.2 (20.7)	70.3 (21.3)	64.2 (17.9)	52.7 (11.5)	41.5 (5.3)	35.3 (1.8)	50.6 (10.3)
Daily mean °F (°C)	31.8 (−0.1)	32.0 (0.0)	34.5 (1.4)	37.8 (3.2)	44.9 (7.2)	50.2 (10.1)	58.4 (14.7)	59.3 (15.2)	54.4 (12.4)	44.9 (7.2)	35.9 (2.2)	30.5 (−0.8)	42.9 (6.1)
Mean daily minimum °F (°C)	26.4 (−3.1)	26.1 (−3.3)	28.1 (−2.2)	30.5 (−0.8)	36.1 (2.3)	41.2 (5.1)	47.5 (8.6)	48.4 (9.1)	44.6 (7.0)	37.2 (2.9)	30.4 (−0.9)	25.7 (−3.5)	35.2 (1.8)
Mean minimum °F (°C)	12.2 (−11.0)	13.7 (−10.2)	18.8 (−7.3)	22.3 (−5.4)	27.1 (−2.7)	32.8 (0.4)	37.8 (3.2)	38.4 (3.6)	33.0 (0.6)	25.3 (−3.7)	19.0 (−7.2)	12.5 (−10.8)	6.6 (−14.1)
Record low °F (°C)	−8 (−22)	−13 (−25)	1 (−17)	12 (−11)	18 (−8)	23 (−5)	29 (−2)	32 (0)	23 (−5)	10 (−12)	−4 (−20)	−12 (−24)	−13 (−25)
Average precipitation inches (mm)	12.61 (320)	9.64 (245)	9.41 (239)	7.78 (198)	5.75 (146)	4.01 (102)	0.88 (22)	1.09 (28)	3.06 (78)	8.42 (214)	12.69 (322)	14.43 (367)	89.77 (2,280)
Average snowfall inches (cm)	48.8 (124)	39.5 (100)	35.6 (90)	17.6 (45)	4.2 (11)	0.6 (1.5)	0.0 (0.0)	0.0 (0.0)	0.2 (0.51)	3.8 (9.7)	30.6 (78)	51.6 (131)	232.5 (591)
Average extreme snow depth inches (cm)	55 (140)	53 (130)	53 (130)	32 (81)	9 (23)	0 (0)	0 (0)	0 (0)	0 (0)	3 (7.6)	21 (53)	42 (110)	55 (140)
Average precipitation days (≥ 0.01 in)	20.2	17.4	19.9	18.7	14.3	10.6	3.8	4.1	7.4	13.1	18.7	21.0	169.2
Average snowy days (≥ 0.1 in)	10.1	9.4	9.2	6.6	2.1	0.4	0.0	0.0	0.1	1.2	7.1	12.1	58.3
Source: NOAA

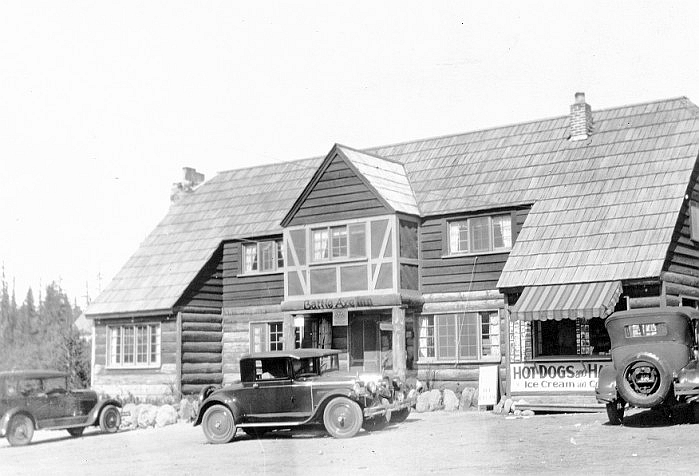
Battle Axe Inn at Government Camp, 1927

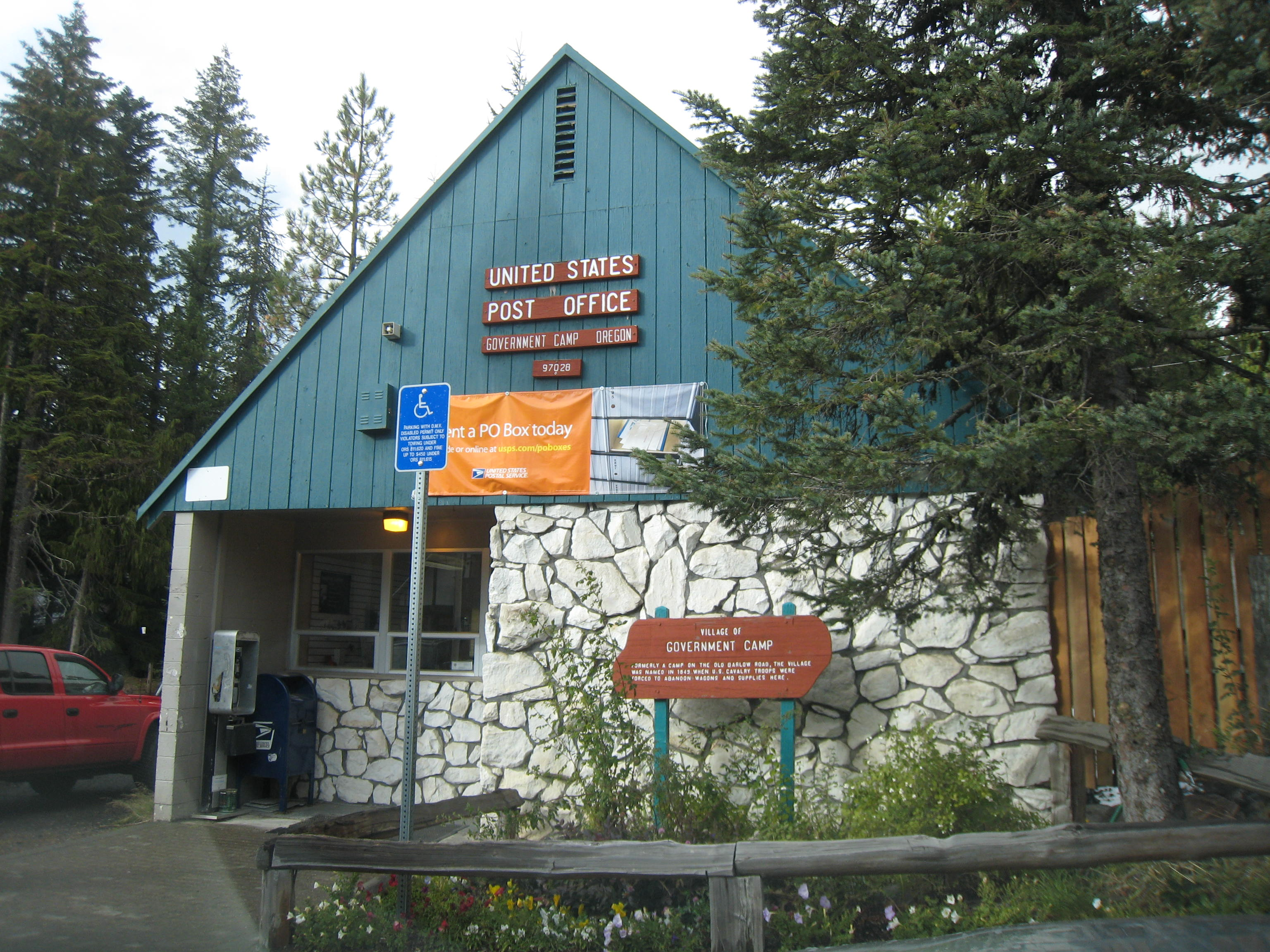
Post office at Government Camp with a sign describing its naming

== See also ==
- Mount Hood Village, Oregon, a census-designated place
- Village (Oregon)
- Zigzag Mountain
