= Mount Hood Skibowl =

Ski area in Oregon, United States

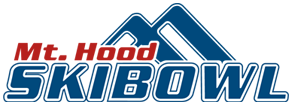

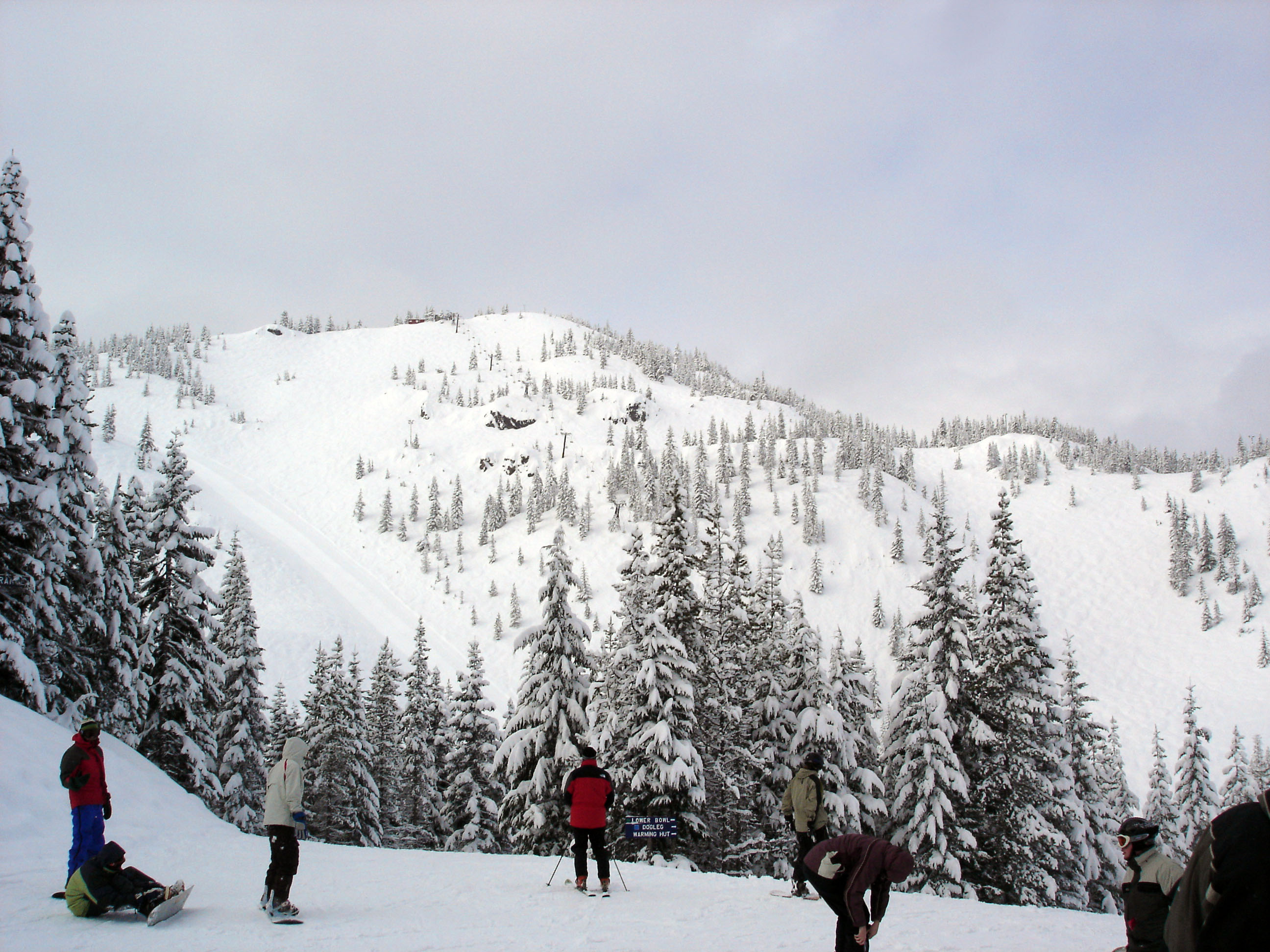
- SkiBowl Peak in the Winter

- Location in Oregon Mount Hood Skibowl (the United States)
- Location: Mount Hood, Clackamas County, Oregon, US
- Nearest city: Government Camp immediately north, Portland 60 miles (100 km) west
- Coordinates: 45.30189°N 121.773212°W
- Top elevation: 5,027 feet (1,532 m)
- Base elevation: 3,500 feet (1,067 m)
- Skiable area: 960 acres (388 ha)
- Trails: 65; 20% beginner 40% intermediate 40% advanced
- Longest run: 3.0 miles (4.8 km)
- Lift system: 4 chairs, 3 rope tow, 1 platter lift, 1 tubing tow
- Snowfall: yearly snowfall: 25 ft (7.62 m) average pack: 8 ft (2.44 m)
- Snowmaking: tubing hill and ski school carpet only
- Night skiing: Yes, 4 chairlifts, 34 runs
- Website: Mount Hood Skibowl

Mount Hood Skibowl is a recreation area on Mount Hood located near Government Camp, Oregon. It is the largest night ski area in the United States, and the total skiable area encompasses an area of 960 acres (388 ha) (about two thirds of this is lit). The resort is the closest ski venue to Portland, with an elevation of 3,600 feet (1,097 m) at the lodge, rising to just over 5,000 feet (1,524 m) at the summit. The average snowfall at the area is 300 inches (762 cm), with an average consolidated base around 100 inches (254 cm) and 65 marked trails. An adventure park in the area includes alpine slides, zip-line, and bungee jumping. As well as other outdoor activities. Just across the highway is Government Camp, the focal point of Mount Hood.

Skibowl is owned by Kirk Hanna. Hanna purchased Skibowl in 1987 and has made many changes since purchasing the resort.

== Mountain statistics ==
- Average Annual Snowfall: Approx. 300 inches
- Average Annual Base: 5–10 feet
- America's largest night-ski area
- Average season length: 4 months, weather depending (Early December – Early April)

=== Elevation ===
- Summit: 5,066 feet at Tom Dick and Harry Mountain
- Base: 3,600 feet
- Vertical drop: ~1,500 feet

== History ==
Mount Hood Skibowl began as two separate resorts, Skibowl and Multorpor. In 1928, Everett Sickler developed Jump Hill on Multorpor Mountain. The following year, the Cascade Ski Club began holding competitions on the hill, which brought national recognition after hosting a National Ski Association event. By 1938, Raymond Hughes had built the first tow rope on Multorpor on what is now the ski run named, Raceway. The current lodge on Multorpor was built by George Butler in 1949.

1937 marked the opening of the Warming Hut on Skibowl and the opening of the mountain's first rope tow that was installed by Boyd French. In 1946, "Sandy" Sandberg installed the first chair lift that connected the lower mountain to the original Upper Bowl tow rope.

=== Multorpor and Skibowl are joined ===
The two resorts came together in 1964 when Carl Reynolds and Everett Darr bought Skibowl. The area is collectively known as Skibowl while the resort at Multorpor Mountain is now Skibowl East.

=== Kirk Hanna purchase ===
In 1987, Kirk Hanna purchased Skibowl out of bankruptcy and began making improvements to the resort. Hanna added 300 acres, expanded the runs that are lit for night skiing, and cut the Olympic Certified, Reynolds Run. Summer activities were also expanded with the addition of mountain biking, go-karts, and miniature golf.

In April 2026 after the facility had closed for the season, a maintenance basket fell from the chairlift along with two maintenance workers. One of them died at the scene and the other was airlifted to a hospital in Portland with critical injuries.

== Gallery ==
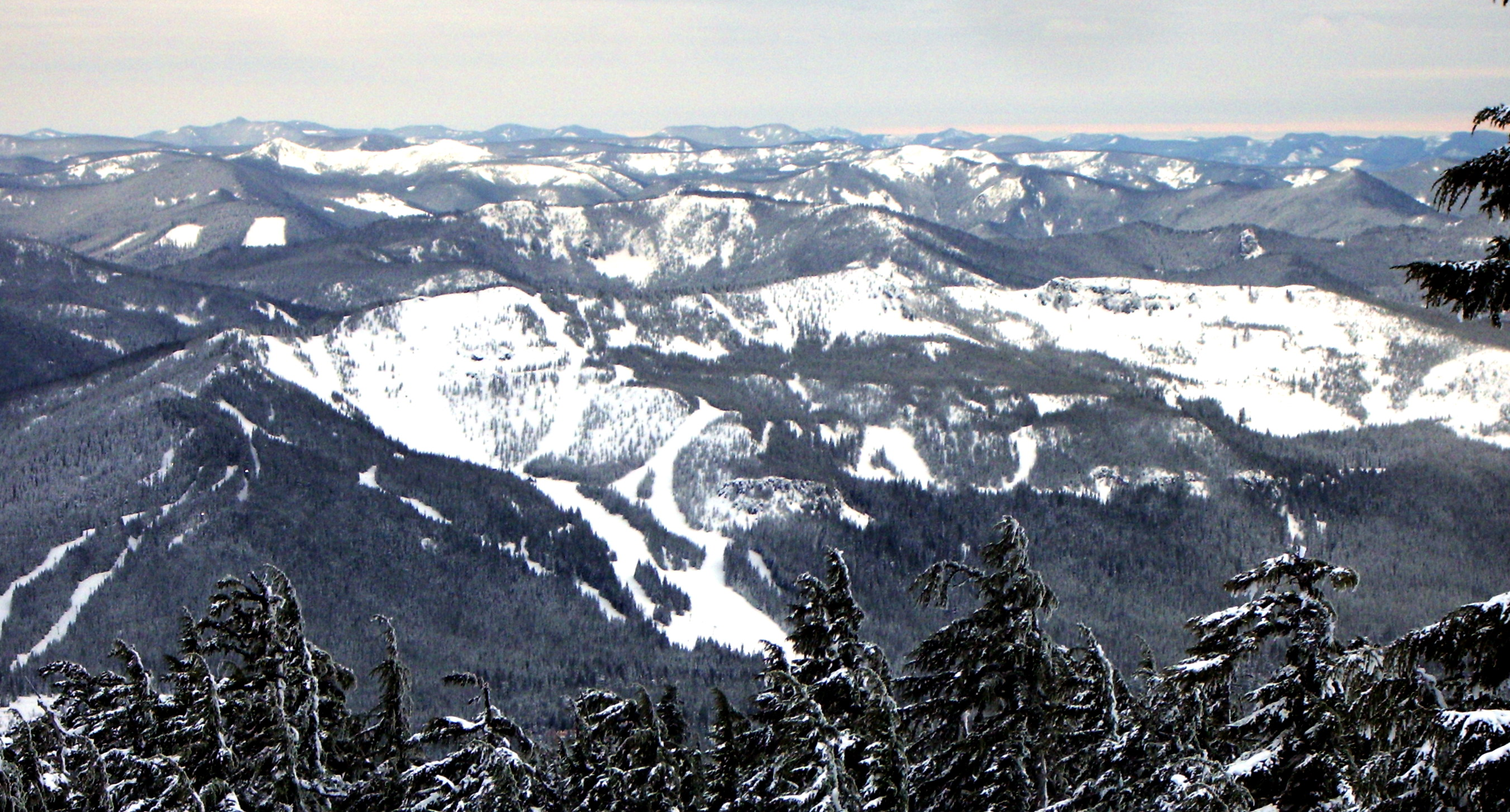
Skibowl seen from Timberline Lodge ski area as night falls

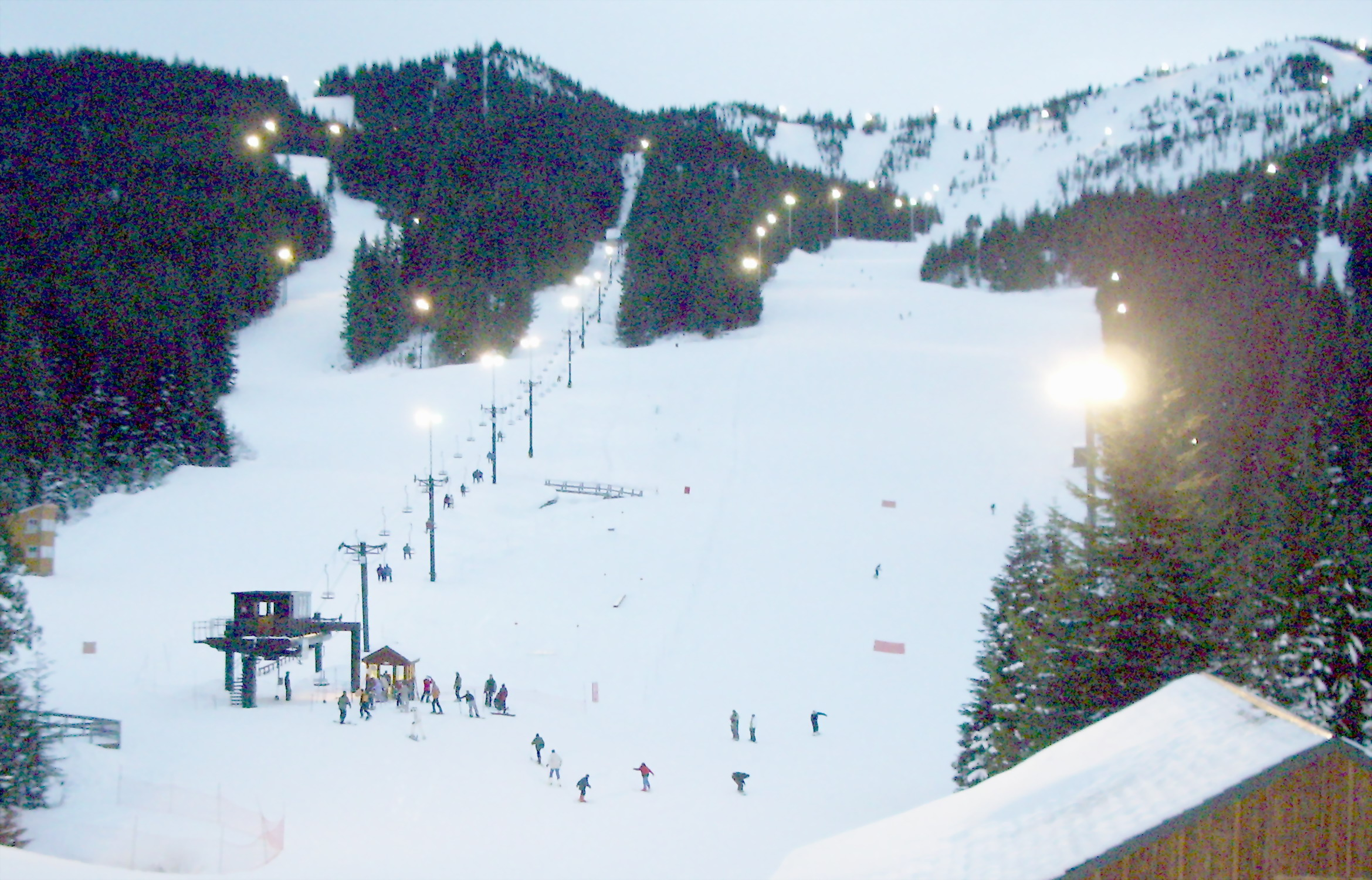
View from main lodge as night skiing begins

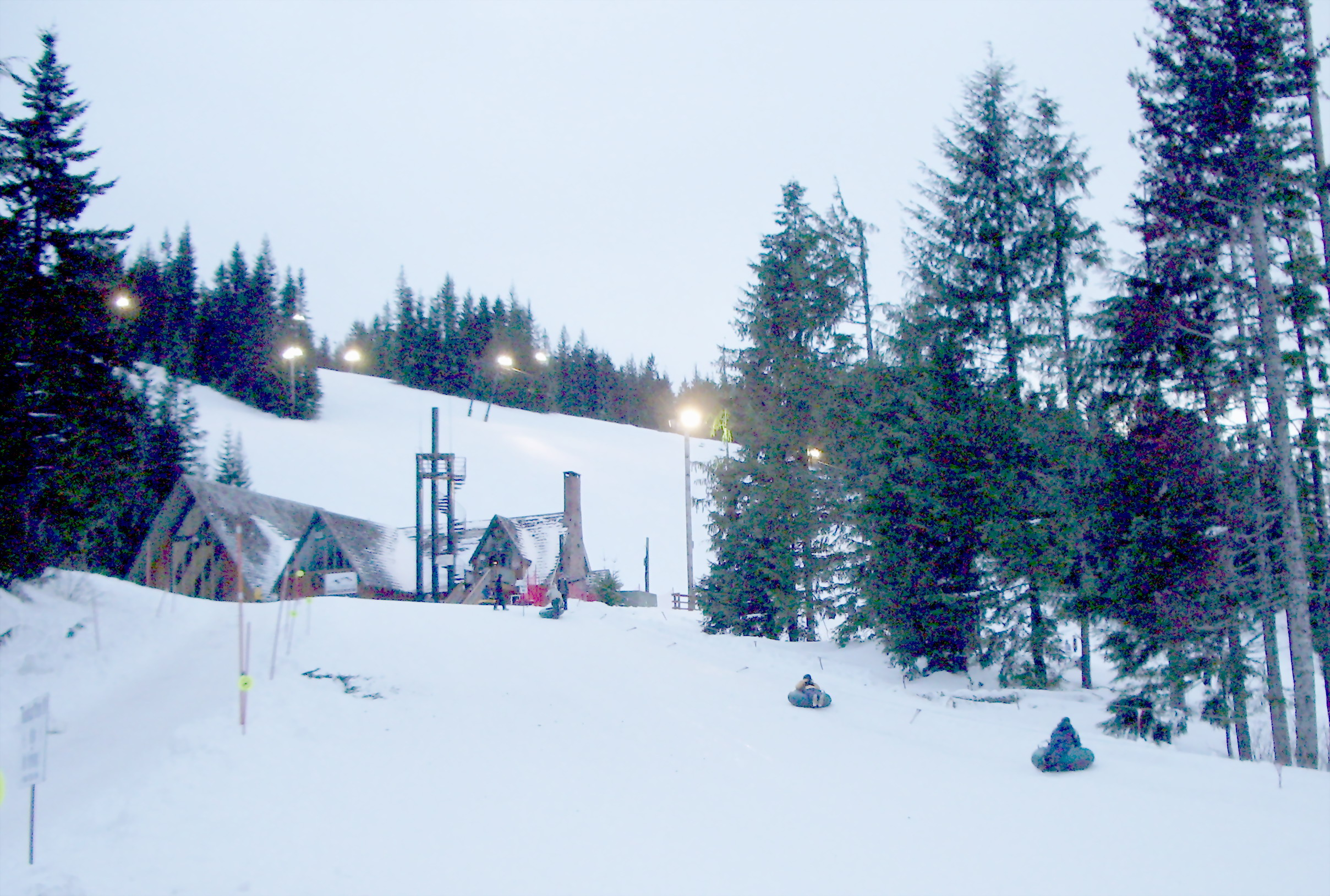
East lodge and part of tubing hill

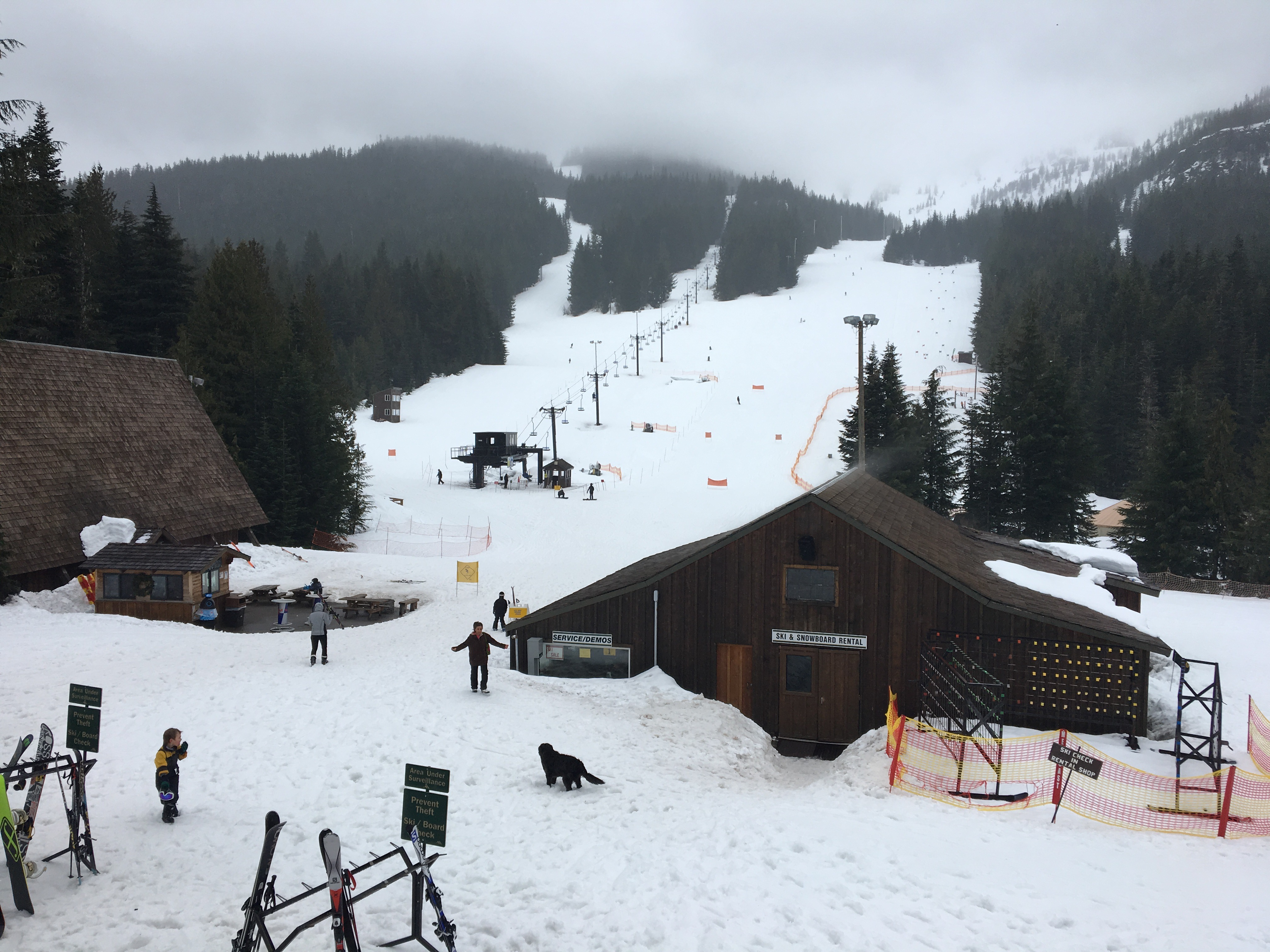
View from main lodge

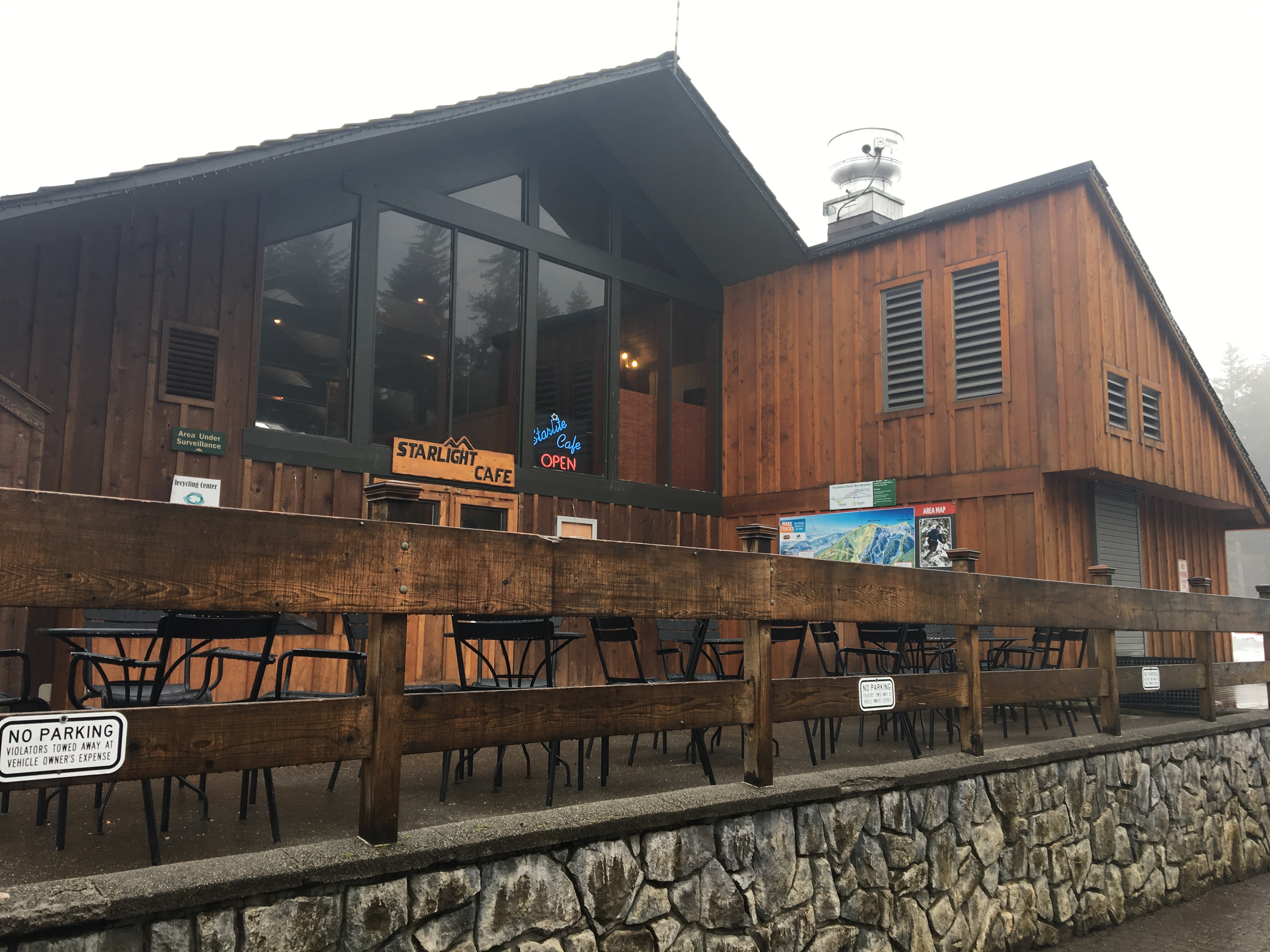
Main lodge

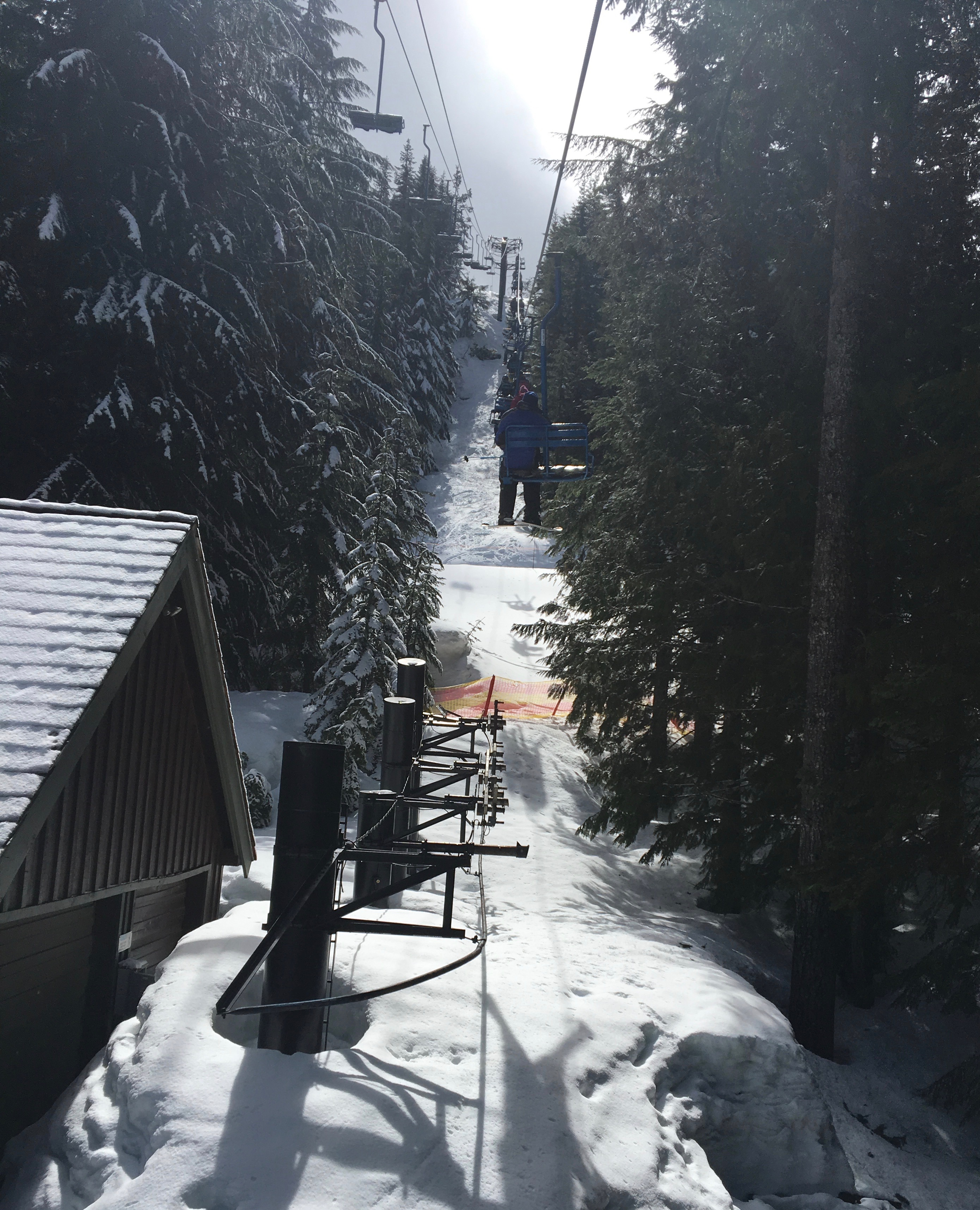
Lower Bowl chairlift

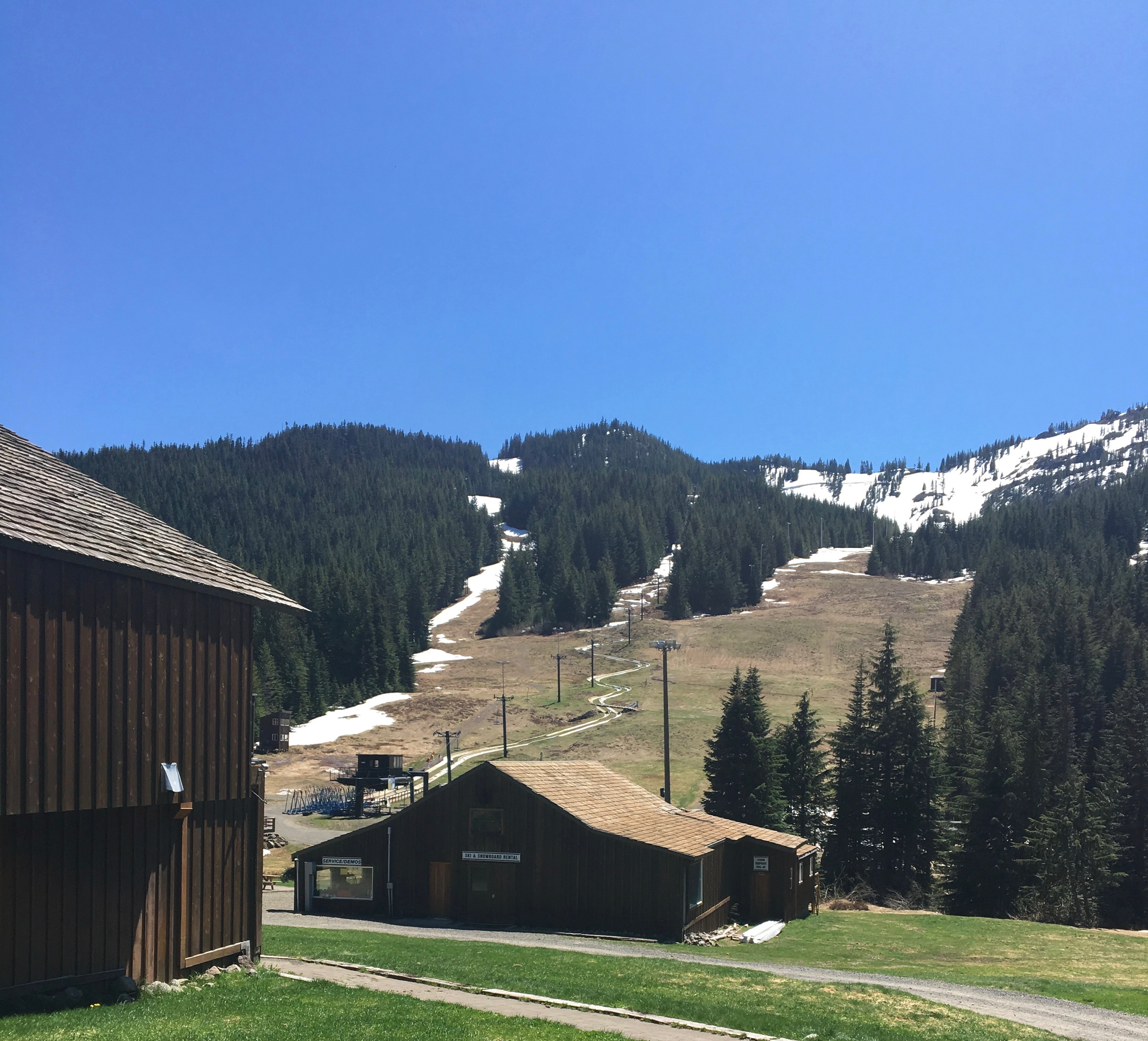
Skibowl in spring

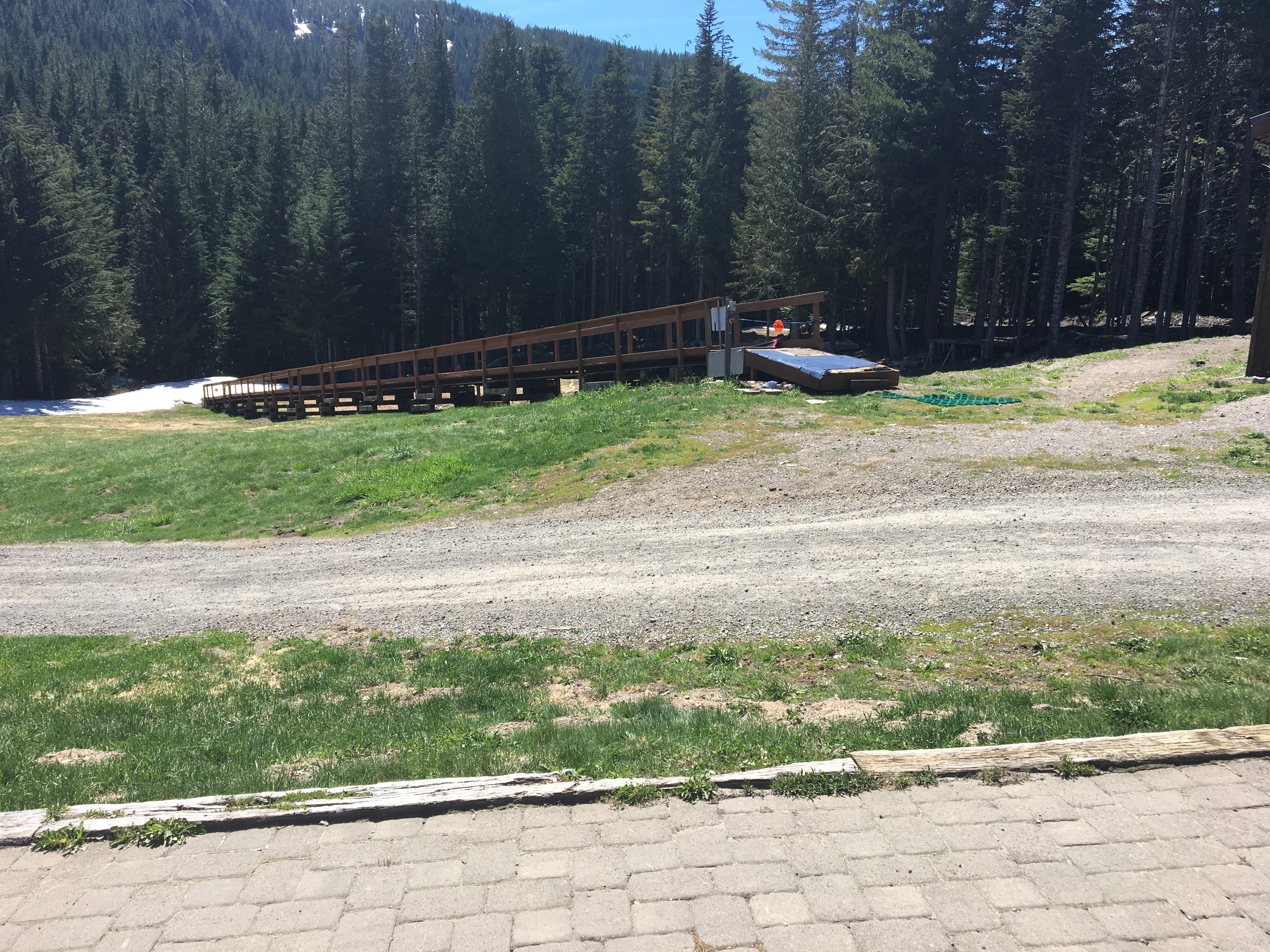
Conveyor belt (training area) in spring
