= Wemme, Oregon =

Unincorporated community in the state of Oregon, United States

Wemme
- Unincorporated community
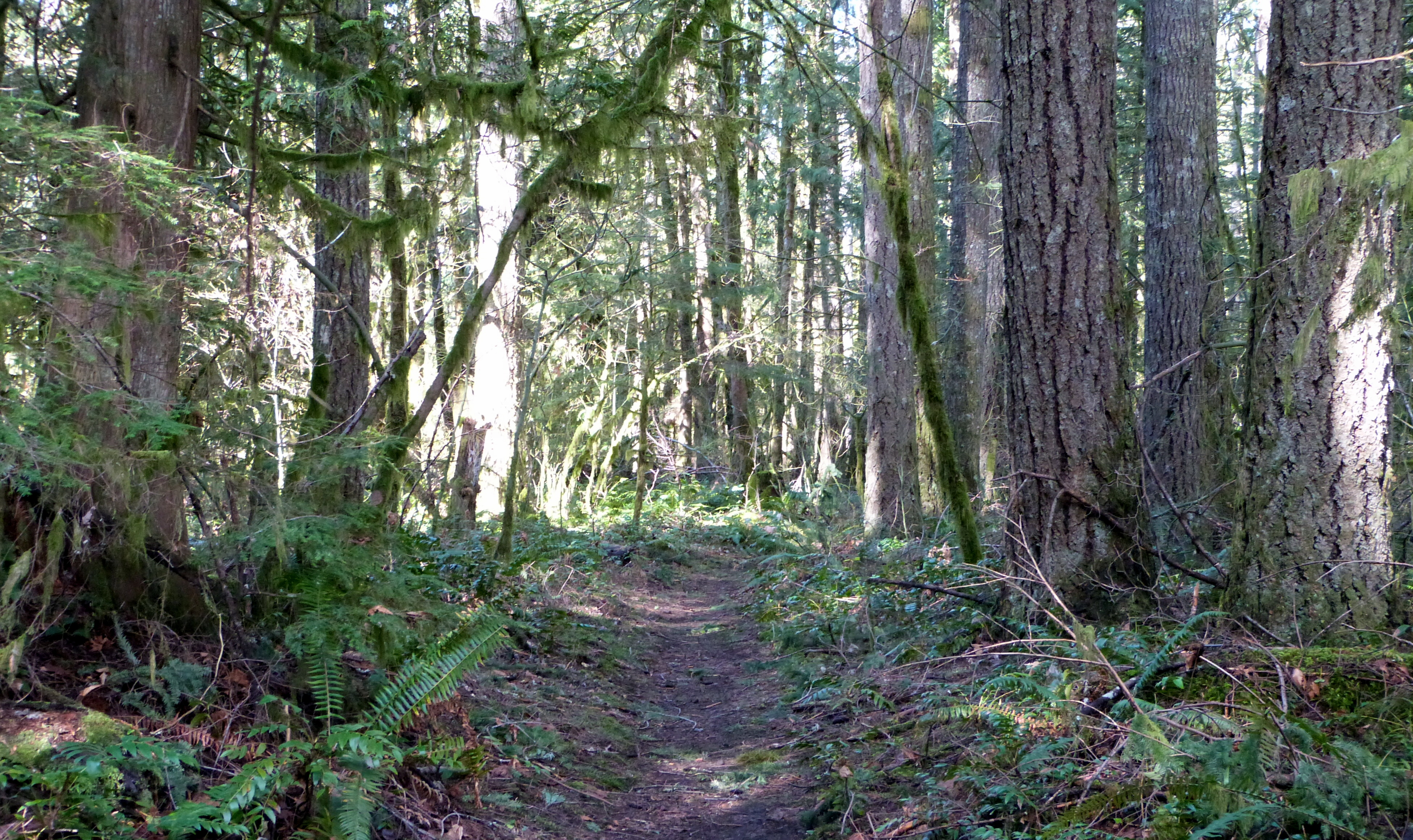
- Barlow Road entrance in Wemme

- Location within the state of Oregon Wemme (the United States)
- Coordinates: 45°20′55″N 121°57′57″W
- Country: United States
- State: Oregon
- County: Clackamas
- Elevation: 1,329 ft (405 m)
- Time zone: UTC-8 (Pacific (PST))
  - Summer (DST): UTC-7 (PDT)
- ZIP code: 97067
- Area codes: 503 and 971
- GNIS feature ID: 1152014

Wemme /ˈwɛmiː/ is an unincorporated community in the northwest United States, located in Clackamas County, Oregon, east of Portland. It is located within the Mount Hood Corridor, between Welches and Brightwood along U.S. Route 26. It is one of the communities that make up the Villages at Mount Hood.

The community was named for E. Henry Wemme, a Portland businessman who bought a Locomobile in 1899, the first automobile in Oregon. He also bought the right-of-way to Barlow Road in 1912, bequeathing it to the public after his death two years later.

== West Coast Airlines Flight 956 ==
- West Coast Airlines Flight 956 crashed 60 years ago in 1966, approximately 5.5 miles (9 km) south of Wemme. It occurred on Saturday night, October 1, with eighteen fatalities and no survivors, and marked the first loss of a Douglas DC-9 aircraft.

== See also ==
- Mount Hood Village CDP
- Village (Oregon)
