= Rhododendron, Oregon =

Unincorporated community in Oregon, United States

Rhododendron
- Unincorporated community and Census designated place
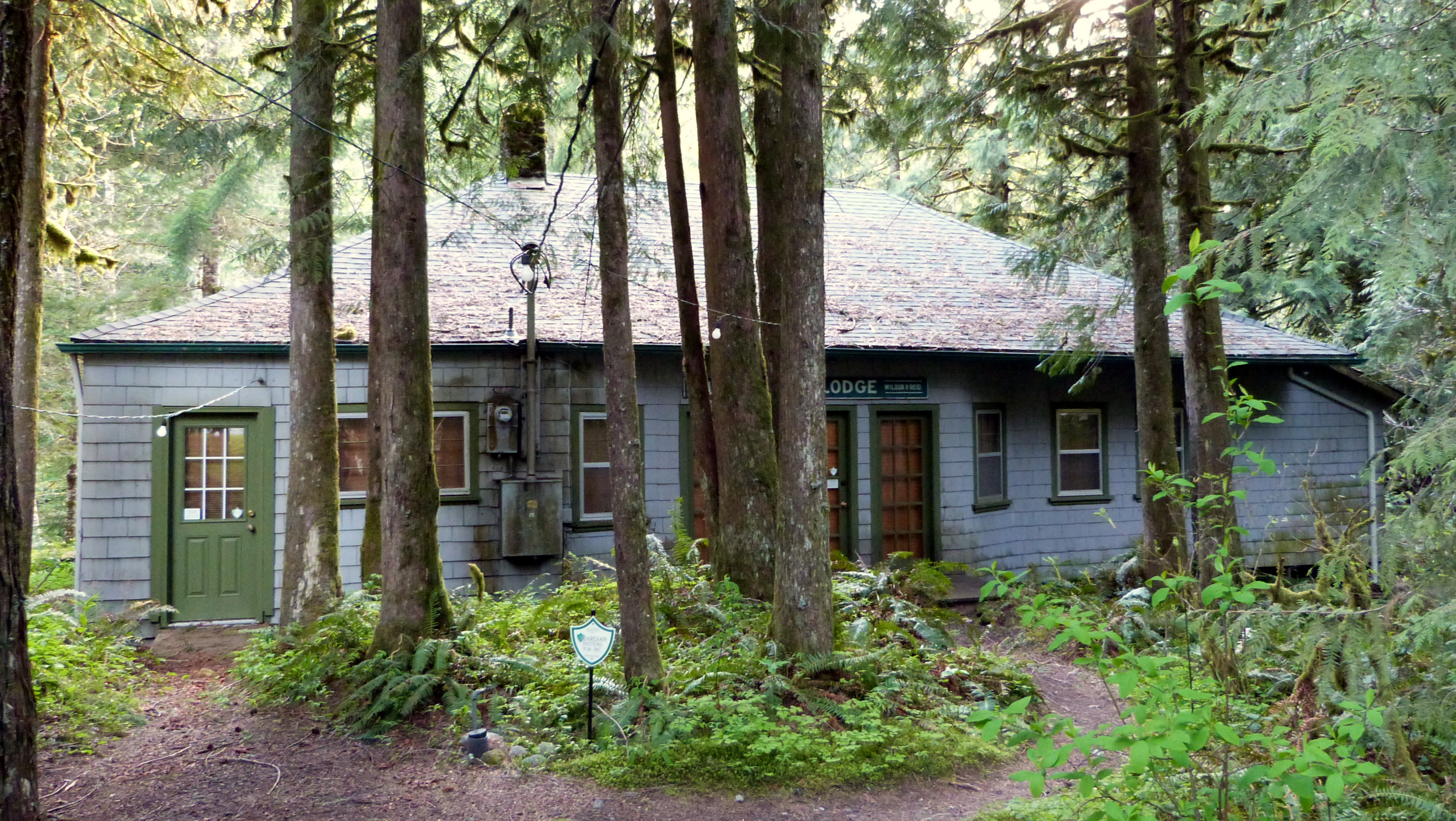
- The Alderbrook Lodge

- Location within the state of Oregon Rhododendron (the United States)
- Coordinates: 45°18′11″N 121°52′46″W
- Country: United States
- State: Oregon
- County: Clackamas
- Elevation: 2,116 ft (645 m)
- Time zone: UTC-8 (Pacific (PST))
  - Summer (DST): UTC-7 (PDT)
- ZIP code: 97049
- Area codes: 503 and 971
- GNIS feature ID: 2805458

Rhododendron is an unincorporated community and census-designated place (CDP) in Clackamas County, Oregon, United States. It is located within the Mount Hood Corridor, between Government Camp and Zigzag on U.S. Route 26 (a.k.a. the Mount Hood Scenic Byway). It is one of the communities that make up the Villages at Mount Hood. As of the 2020 census, Rhododendron had a population of 262.

A post office was established in the area in 1909 and named "Rowe" after Henry S. Rowe, a mayor of Portland, Oregon, who was interested in developing the state's scenic attractions. In 1917 the office was renamed "Zig Zag" and shortly thereafter "Zigzag". (The name was later reused for the post office in the current community of Zigzag.) In 1920 the office was renamed "Rhododendron" because of the large number of rhododendrons growing near there. The community started out as a summer resort colony, but with the increased popularity of skiing, it became a year-round settlement.

== See also ==
- Mount Hood Village CDP
