= Brightwood, Oregon =

Unincorporated community in the state of Oregon, United States

Brightwood
- Unincorporated community
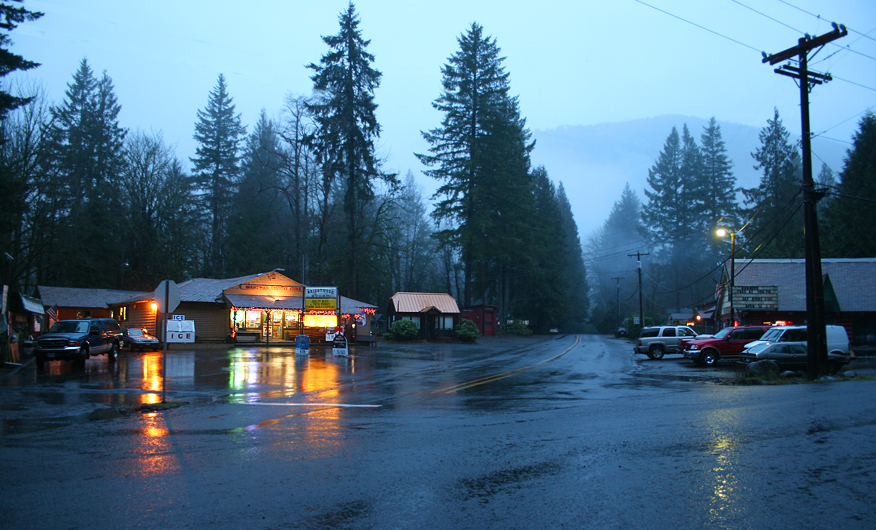
- Interactive map of Brightwood
- Coordinates: 45°22′30″N 122°01′12″W
- Country: United States
- State: Oregon
- County: Clackamas
- Elevation: 1,145 ft (349 m)
- Time zone: UTC-8 (Pacific (PST))
  - Summer (DST): UTC-7 (PDT)
- ZIP codes: 97011
- GNIS feature ID: 1167849

Brightwood is an unincorporated community within the Mount Hood Corridor in Clackamas County, Oregon, United States. It is located between Wemme and Sandy just off U.S. Route 26 at an elevation of 1165 feet (355 meters). It is one of the communities that make up the Villages at Mount Hood.

A post office called "Salmon" was established in the area in 1891, named after the nearby Salmon River. The post office was renamed Brightwood in 1910. The name Brightwood was said to have been coined by a local resident, Mr. Alcorn, for the pleasing effect of the sun shining on the cottonwood trees in the spring.

== Climate ==
This region experiences warm and dry summers, with no average monthly temperatures above 71.6 °F (22.0 °C). According to the Köppen Climate Classification system, Brightwood has a warm-summer Mediterranean climate, abbreviated "Csb" on climate maps.

== Notable people ==
- Brenda Strong, actress

== See also ==
- Village (Oregon)
