= River Rhythms =

River Rhythms may refer to:

- River Rhythms (Albany) in Albany, Oregon
- River Rhythms (Wisconsin) in Milwaukee, Wisconsin
