= Linn County Courthouse =

Linn County Courthouse may refer to:

- Linn County Courthouse (Iowa), Cedar Rapids, Iowa
- Linn County Courthouse (Kansas), Mound City, Kansas
- Linn County Courthouse (Missouri), Linneus, Missouri
- Linn County Courthouse (Oregon), Albany, Oregon
