= Neil Elshire =

American football player (born 1958)

No. 90, 65, 73
- Position: Defensive end

Personal information
- Born: March 8, 1958 (age 68); Salem, Oregon, U.S.

Career information
- High school: South Albany (Albany, Oregon)
- College: Oregon
- NFL draft: 1981: undrafted

Career history
- Washington Redskins (1981)*; Minnesota Vikings (1981–1986)
- * Offseason or practice squad member only

Awards and highlights
- Second-team All-Pac-10 (1979)

Career NFL statistics
- Games played - started: 63, 90 - 27
- Sacks: 19
- Fumble recoveries: 4
- Stats at Pro Football Reference

Neil James Elshire (born March 8, 1958) is an American former professional football player who was a defensive end for six seasons with the Minnesota Vikings of the National Football League (NFL). He played college football for the Oregon Ducks. His son Erik Elshire also played college football for the [Oregon Ducks.

== Career ==
Attended University of Oregon. 6'6" 260 lbs (198 cm 117 kg) Defensive End. In his six seasons with the Vikings, 81–86, Elshire tallied his career high in sacks with 9.5 with a total of 19 in his career, he also recorded one safety.

== Personal life ==
He is currently the head coach for the Madras High School football team in Madras, Oregon, where he resides with his wife and five children. His son Erik Elshire played football for the University of Oregon from 2005 to 2008 and is now pursuing a doctorate in Education Policy at the University of Illinois Chicago, while Neil's four daughters excel in a variety of other disciplines.
