= Greater Albany Public School District =

Public school district in Oregon

Education in Albany, Oregon, United States is coordinated by Greater Albany Public School District 8J (GAPS 8J). Established in 1979 and encompassing 154 sq mi (400 km^{2}), this educational district aims to educate the children of Albany from grades K through 12. GAPS has an enrollment of just over 10,000 students.

== School ratings ==
All schools are graded according to the Oregon Department of Education Annual Year Report and Report Card. All schools were graded as "satisfactory", with eight graded "strong" and one as "exceptional".

== Faculty ratings ==
Nearly nine-tenths of educators within the GAPS district hold bachelor's degrees or educational certificates while one in two have a master's degree, including an overall total average teaching experience of more than five years.

== Administration ==
The superintendent is Andy Gardner. His predecessor was Melissa Goff.

== Albany schools ==
=== Elementary schools ===
- Central Elementary School
  - Built in 1915.
  - Student body of approximately 200 students.
- Grades 3–5; grades K-2 attend Takena.
- Lafayette Elementary School
  - Established in 1960.
  - Approximately 400 students.
- Liberty Elementary School
  - Established in 1949.
  - Approximately 425 students.
  - Located opposite Memorial MS and West Albany HS, next to Memorial Stadium.
- North Albany Elementary School
  - Mileage Club, which rewards students for running during recess.
  - Only school rated "Exceptional" by the State in the 8J School District.
  - Established in 1906 & rebuilt in 1949.
  - Approximately 300 students.
- Oak Elementary School
- The Groves: Fir & Oak Elementary Schools
  - Fir Grove(Now Closed) houses kindergarten, first & second grade. Students in grades 3, 4 & 5 attend Oak Grove.
  - Grades: K-2 enroll approximately 160 students
  - Grades 3-5 enroll approximately 185 students
- Oak Grove elementary School
  - Established in 1860.
  - Approximately 160 students.
  - Located on the city limits amidst farmland and residential areas.
- Periwinkle Elementary School
  - Built in 1977.
  - Approximately 460 students.
- South Shore Elementary School
  - Built in 1971.
  - Approximately 400 students.
- Sunrise Elementary School
  - Established in 1949.
  - Approximately 450 students.
- Takena Elementary School
  - Built in 1971.
  - Approximately 160 students.

Grades K-2; grades 3-5 attend Central.

- Tangent Elementary School
  - Established in 1965.
  - Approximately 200 students.
- Waverly Elementary School
  - Established in 1949
  - Approximately 240 students.

=== Middle schools ===
- Calapooia MS
  - Built in 1962.
  - Student body of approximately 750 students.
- Memorial MS
  - Established in 1963 next to West Albany High School.
  - Student body of approximately 665 students.
  - 3 sports programs and over 5 clubs and groups.
- North Albany MS
  - Established in North Albany in 1966.
  - Student body of approximately 600 students.
  - Reward/Incentive programs (Top Tiger, Gold Cards, Tiger Eyes Are On You) for exceptional attendance and final grades.

=== High schools ===
- West Albany High School
  - Established 1953 as Albany Union High School
  - 53-acre (210,000 m^{2}) campus includes 1/4 mile running track, Memorial Stadium, and large, grass, sports fields and softball and tennis courts.
  - Student body of approximately 1350 students.
  - Over 25 clubs and groups and over 10 athletic sports.
  - Mascot: Bulldog
  - School colors: Navy & Gold
- South Albany High School
  - Established in 1970 to meet the growing educational needs of Albany.
  - 167,000 square feet (15,500 m^{2}) of instructional space and supplemental buildings (this is the largest educational area within Albany)
  - Student body of approximately 1200 students.
  - Over 15 athletic sports and over 22 clubs and groups.
  - Owns and operates a community pool/aquatic facilities for South Albany High School and the Albany Community at large.
  - Mascot: RedHawks
  - School colors: Red and Grey

=== Alternative schools ===
- Albany Options School
  - Grades 6–12

=== Former Schools ===
- Clover Ridge Elementary School
  - Established in 1914.
  - Student body of approximately 300 students.

== See also ==
- List of school districts in Oregon
