= Albany Timber Carnival =

Annual event in Oregon, United States

- Status: Discontinued
- Frequency: Annually
- Location: Albany, Oregon
- Country: United States
- Inaugurated: 1941

The Albany Timber Carnival was held annually in Albany, Oregon from 1941 to 2000 with no events being held between 1942 and 1945 due to World War II.

Timber Carnivals typically featured competitive logrolling, wood chopping, cross-cut sawing, and Hot Saw. Chainsaw carving artwork was also displayed.

With the decline of the timber industry in the Willamette Valley, in the 1990's the carnival's prominence would fade.

== History ==
In 1940 Albany citizens came together to organize a Fourth of July celebration. The next year, 1941, Albany's Junior Chamber of Commerce also known as The Jaycee's put on another event for Fourth of July. That year to celebrate Albany's growing timber industry in the 1930's and 40's it was dubbed the "Central Willamette Timber Carnival."

Every year after that, besides the brief break between 1942-1945, the Jaycee's and large groups of volunteers would come together to host the Timber Carnival. The carnival was originally hosted at Waverly Lake for many years before moving to the lake at Timber Linn Park. The inaugural 1941 carnival featured birling, log sawing, speed climbing, and tree topping competitions. These events and others related to logging would come in and out of rotation in Timber Carnivals to come.

With the decline of the timber industry in the Willamette Valley in the 1990's the carnival's prominence would fade, and in 2000, Albany would host its last Timber Carnival.

In 2008 the carnival returned for a year but with the wanning interest in timber and logging sports in the area, the group hosting the event, the Mid-Valley Events Club, decided to move away from hosting logging related events and in 2009, their Fourth of July event would be named "The Albany Summer Fest."

== See also ==
- List of chainsaw carving competitions
