= Albany Options School =

Location
- 710 19th Avenue SE; Albany, (Linn County), Oregon 97322; United States; 44.622888°N 123.093964°W

Information
- Type: Public
- School district: Greater Albany Public School District
- Principal: Mark Hannan
- Grades: 10-12
- Enrollment: 155
- Mascot: Knights
- Website: Albany Options School

Albany Options School is a public alternative school in Albany, Oregon, United States. It provides alternative education for students who are working below or above state benchmark standards in a community-based setting that is put in place to support students who may struggle in a more traditional high school environment. These opportunities include transitional programs, credit-recovery programs, higher-education courses and education through contracted services. Albany Options School is an accredited alternative school serving high school and GED students. The school also had a preschool program linked with the Boys & Girls Club of Albany at the Albany Options School, serving up to 20 children close to the age of 5.

== Academics ==
In 2008, 14% of the school's seniors received a high school diploma. Of 86 students, 12 graduated, 64 dropped out, one received a modified diploma, and nine were still in high school in 2009. In contrast in 2010 the school graduated 57 with either a high school diploma or a GED.

Four academic programs are offered through the Albany Options school:

- Community Services Consortium offers a program providing transitional services for middle and high school students. Classes are held in Albany's Two Rivers Market building. School counselors refer students to the principal for this program.
- The dual enrollment program allows students from local high schools to earn college and high school credit for work completed at their high school, or at a college. Students may register for dual enrollment at their high school or through the principal.
- A GED program provides study and testing, allowing students to obtain a GED high-school equivalency certificate at Linn-Benton Community College. School counselors and administrators refer students to this program.
- A tutoring program provides individualized instruction for students who need specialized assistance or who cannot attend the regular school program because of illness, expulsion or other factors. Tutoring is done in one-hour sessions per day to replace a full day of instruction. Students are also referred to the tutoring program by counselors, administrators or the district's student services director.
