= Central Albany Revitalization Area =

Central Albany Revitalization Area (CARA) was established by the Albany, Oregon City Council in the summer of 2001 following a series of public forums held in the fall and winter of 2000–2001. CARA contains 986 acres (3.99 km^{2}) or 9.7 percent of the total acreage of Albany. It includes the traditional city core area, known as Central Albany, with surrounding neighborhoods and areas of mixed commercial and industrial uses to the south and east. CARA's goal is to revitalize the Central Albany Revitalization Area by attract new private investment to the area and to retain and enhance the value of existing private investment and public investment in the area. They also aim to encourage pedestrian and bicycle access to the district by providing a convenient transportation network. All of this done with a focus on preserving the Historic Districts that make up the revitalization area.
