= West Albany High School =

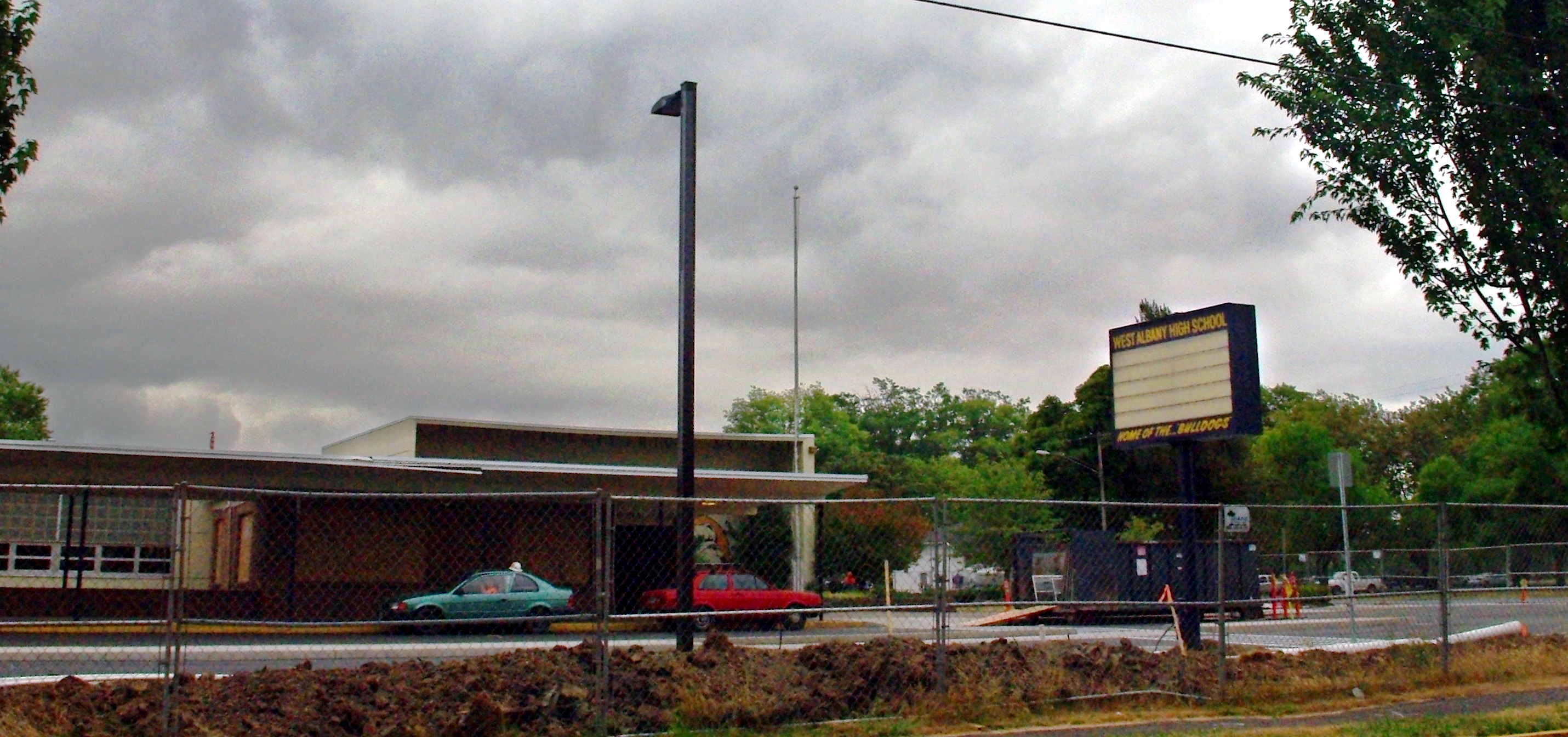

Location
- 1130 Queen Avenue Southwest; Albany, Linn County, Oregon 97321; United States; 44.622659°N 123.11709°W

Information
- Type: Public
- Motto: Where Excellence is a Strong Tradition. and Once a bulldog, always a bulldog.
- Opened: 1910 (1953)
- School district: Greater Albany Public School District
- Principal: Rich Engel
- Teaching staff: NA for 2023–2024 (on an FTE basis)
- Grades: 9-12
- Enrollment: 1,282 (2023–2024)
- Student to teacher ratio: NA for 2023–2024
- Campus: Suburban
- Colors: Navy, Vegas Gold, and Gray
- Athletics conference: OSAA 5A-3 Mid-Willamette Conference
- Mascot: Bulldog
- Team name: Bulldogs
- Website: West Albany Home Page

West Albany High School is a public high school in Albany, Oregon, United States.

West Albany High School was formerly named Albany Union High School before the completion of South Albany High School in 1972.

== Academics ==
In 2008, 93% of the school's seniors received their high school diploma. Of 325 students, 303 graduated, 13 dropped out, four received a modified diploma, and five stayed on for another year.

West Albany High School offers 16 Advanced Placement (AP) courses and 26 opportunities for college credit through Linn-Benton Community College.

== Athletics ==
West Albany High School athletic teams compete in the OSAA 5A-3 Mid-Willamette Conference.

State championships:

- Boys Golf: 1974, 1997, 2008, 2009, 2013
- Boys Swimming: 2024
- Band: 2019, 2023, 2024, 2026
- Cheerleading: 1989, 1997, 1998, 2009, 2010, 2011
- Dance/Drill: 1987, 1993, 1994, 1998, 2007, 2022, 2026
- Football: 2007, 2008, 2013
- Girls Basketball: 2026
- Girls Tennis: 1975†, 1976, 2008†
- Softball: 2011
- Volleyball: 2012, 2013, 2021

(†=Tied with 1 or more schools)

== Attempted massacre ==
On May 27, 2013, a junior who was attending the school was found with an arsenal of explosives under the floorboards of his bedrooms. The explosives included a Molotov cocktail, a napalm bomb, and Drano bombs. He supposedly wanted to make a more "successful version" of the Columbine High School massacre. He was charged with attempted aggravated murder and six counts each of unlawful possession and manufacture of a destructive device. He accepted a plea deal, with reduced charges of six counts of manufacture of a destructive device, and two counts of unlawful use of a weapon. He was sentenced to 10 years in the custody of the Oregon Youth Authority.

== Notable alumni ==
- Mike Barrett, sports announcer
- Rick Haselton, judge
- Ardyth Kennelly, writer
- Ron Saxton, politician
