= Albany Parks & Recreation =

City agency in Albany, Oregon, United States

Coordinates: 44°38′06.91″N 123°06′24.64″W

The Albany Parks & Recreation is a city agency in Albany, Oregon, United States responsible for maintaining the local city parks as well as organizing cultural events. Its headquarters are at City Hall, 333 Broadalbin Street SW. One goal of the City of Albany is to have all residents live within 2 miles (3 km) of a park.

== Special events ==
- Children's Performing Art Series
- Northwest Art and Air Festival
- River Rhythms concert series (Thursdays in July/August)
- Summer Sounds concert series (Mondays in July)

== Parks ==
=== Albany Skatepark ===
The Albany Skatepark is a variable altitude concrete structure in which skateboarders, in-line skaters, and rollerskaters can come to practice. It is situated next to the Albany Skating Rink at 1375 6th Ave SE, and attracts people from Lebanon, Corvallis, Tangent, and Sweet Home.

=== Bowman ===
Bowman Park is a 26-acre (11 ha) park situated next to the Willamette River. The attractions of this park are open greenspaces, trees, barbecue pits, picnic tables, a boat launch ramp, city provided restrooms, along with trail access and shelters are a few of the features found here.

=== Bryant ===
Bryant Park is 72 acre (291,000 m²) park that sits at 801 Bryant Way with diverse facilities ranging from softball fields to football courts, horseshoe pits to playgrounds, picnicking amenities to trail and river access to both the Calapooia River and the Willamette River . It sits right across the Calapooia River from Monteith River Park. The softball fields are commonly used for games of the local youth softball teams.

=== Burkhart ===
Burkhart park is a 2-acre (8,100 m^{2}) park located at 550 Burkhart St SE in Albany. The park features a basketball court, horseshoe pit, softball field, tennis courts and a play area for physical entertainment. It also features barbecue grills.

=== Burkhart Square ===
Burkhart Square located at 110 First Ave SW sits right next to Albany Civic Theater and is 1-acre (4,000 m^{2}) in size. It is a paved park with picnic tables and planted areas.

=== Deerfield ===
Deerfeild Park is located at 2627 Del Rio Ave on the southeast corner of Albany. It features Basketball courts, a softball field and play equipment for physical entertainment. It also features Barbecue grills and access to a trail and to a bike path.

=== Doug Killin Friendship ===
Doug Killin Friendship Park is a 1.8-acre (7,300 m^{2}) park located at 4990 Deer Run St, and is one of the newer parks in Albany.

=== Draper ===
Draper Park sits adjacent to Layfetee Elementary School at 756 29th Ave SE. Draper Park has a softball field, a basketball court and play equipment along with barbecue grills.

=== Eads ===
Eads Park, created in 2009, It sits at the Corner of Alco and Linn Ave. It features a playground structure.

=== Eleanor Hackleman ===
Eleanor Hackleman Park is located at 654 Pine St SE and sits right across the road from the Albany Skatepark. The parks was named after Eleanor Hackleman a historic figure in Albany. Eleanor Hackleman park is also host to the Albany Rose Society Rose Gardens at the corner of the park.

=== Gibson Hill ===
Gibson Hill park is a seven-acre (28,000 m²) park located adjacent Gibson Hill Road in North Albany. It is situated in the midst of a booming residential area and is adjacent to a fire station. This park provides access to basketball courts, playground equipment, bicycle paths, trail access, and a sand volleyball court, as well as a large open grassy area with interconnected sidewalks.

=== Grand Prairie ===
Albany's Grand Prairie park is a 10-acre park located at 2530 Grand Prairie. Grand Prairie Park circles around Grand Prairie Lake and the Periwinkle Creek runs through the park. It is also the starting point of the Periwinkle bike trail. The park features a basketball court, a disc golf course, play equipment, and a softball field. The park is also commonly used for fishing at the lake and has a covered shelter, public restrooms and barbecue grills.

=== Hazelwood ===
Hazelwood Park is a 3-acre (12,000 m^{2}) park located at 1999 Queen Ave on the far west side of Albany and it featured play equipment for entertainment.

=== Henderson ===
Henderson park is one of Albany's smaller parks at only 1-acre (4,000 m^{2}), it is located at 833 Calapooia St near the historic parts of the city. The park sits along the canal and features play equipment, a basketball court and a tennis court.

=== Kinder Park ===
Kinder park, another of Albany's newer parks is located along Oak St sitting near the opposing end of Periwinkle Bike Path from Grand Prairie Park. It features two softball field, play equipment, park benches and picnic tables, along with open grass fields.

=== Lehigh ===
Lehigh Park is a 5-acre (20,000 m^{2}) park located at 3100 17th Ave. This park features basketball courts, a softball field and play equipment along with many large trees bordering the park.

=== Lexington ===
Lexington Park is a 5-acre (20,000 m^{2}) park located at 3100 17th Ave. It features a large play structure and sitting area. The park is also the location of the Legacy Forest program. The Legacy Forest at Lexington Park is a commemorative tree planting program designed to perpetuate the memory or work of individuals and organizations.

=== Maple Lawn ===
Maple Lawn Park is a 2-acre (8,100 m^{2}) park that sits at 1950 Old Salem Rd and is the park attached to the Maple Lawn Preschool. The park features a play structure, Planted gardens and open grass spaces.

=== Monteith Riverpark ===
Monteith Riverpark is a six-acre (24,000 m²) park located on Water Avenue in downtown Albany. This park is home to the River Rhythms concert series on the famous Monteith Stage, built by Brent Gourley Construction. It also has numerous bike and pedestrian pathways, restrooms, a playground, covered gazebo/meeting area, horseshoe pits and a large grass area. This park is rimmed by various vegetation and trees. Paths also give access to a marina dock, the Willamette River, and the Calapooia River.

=== Periwinkle ===
Periwinkle Park is a 7-acre (28,000 m^{2}) park that sits at 2298 21st Ave right behind Periwinkle Elementary School. Periwinkle Creek and the bike path that runs alongside the creek run along the side of the park. The creek runs into Periwinkle Pond at the park as well before continuing on through town. The park also features several play structures in conjunction with the school. During the spring summer and autumn seasons the park and pond are frequented by usually several hundred ducks.

=== Pineway ===
Pineway park is a 2-acre park with play equipment, BBQ grills and a basketball court. The park is located at 1592 Moraga Ave SE toward the south east corner of Albany.

=== Takena Landing ===
Takena Landing is a 72-acre (291,000 m²) park on the North bank of the Willamette River. It is also adjacent to US Highway 20 and intersects with North Albany Road. A distinctive feature of Takena Landing is its boat ramp. Many citizens launch their boats from this park. The park also offers greenspaces, shaded by myriad large trees, barbecue grills and temporary boat parking at a wooden dock.

=== Timber Linn ===
Timber Linn Park is a 90-acre (364,000 m²) park situated east of Interstate 5 and south of the Albany Municipal Airport on SE Price Road. Timber Linn Park has large open spaces with basketball courts, softball fields, horseshoe pits, various bike and pedestrian paths, playgrounds, covered meeting areas, tennis courts and a Frisbee field. Timber Linn Park is next to an open-air amphitheater used as a musical performance venue. There is a surviving example of a World War II era 155mm Long Tom heavy field artillery piece on display.

=== Waverly ===
Waverly Park is a 20-acre (81,000 m²) park located on Pacific Boulevard, just off of I5 Exit 234B. Waverly Lake takes up a vast majority of the park. Waverly is home to seasonal paddle boat recreation and to a giant floating foam duck (which has occupied the lake day and night for more than ten years). The park offers barbecue grills, picnic tables, access to bike paths, restrooms, and trees and greenspace.

The lake itself was created in the 1930's after a large hole was left in the area from material used to build the I-5 Overpass nearby. Cox Creek was diverted to fill the lake that stands today.

It was the first location of the Albany Timber Carnival back in 1941.
