= Coastal Farm & Ranch =

American farm supply retailer

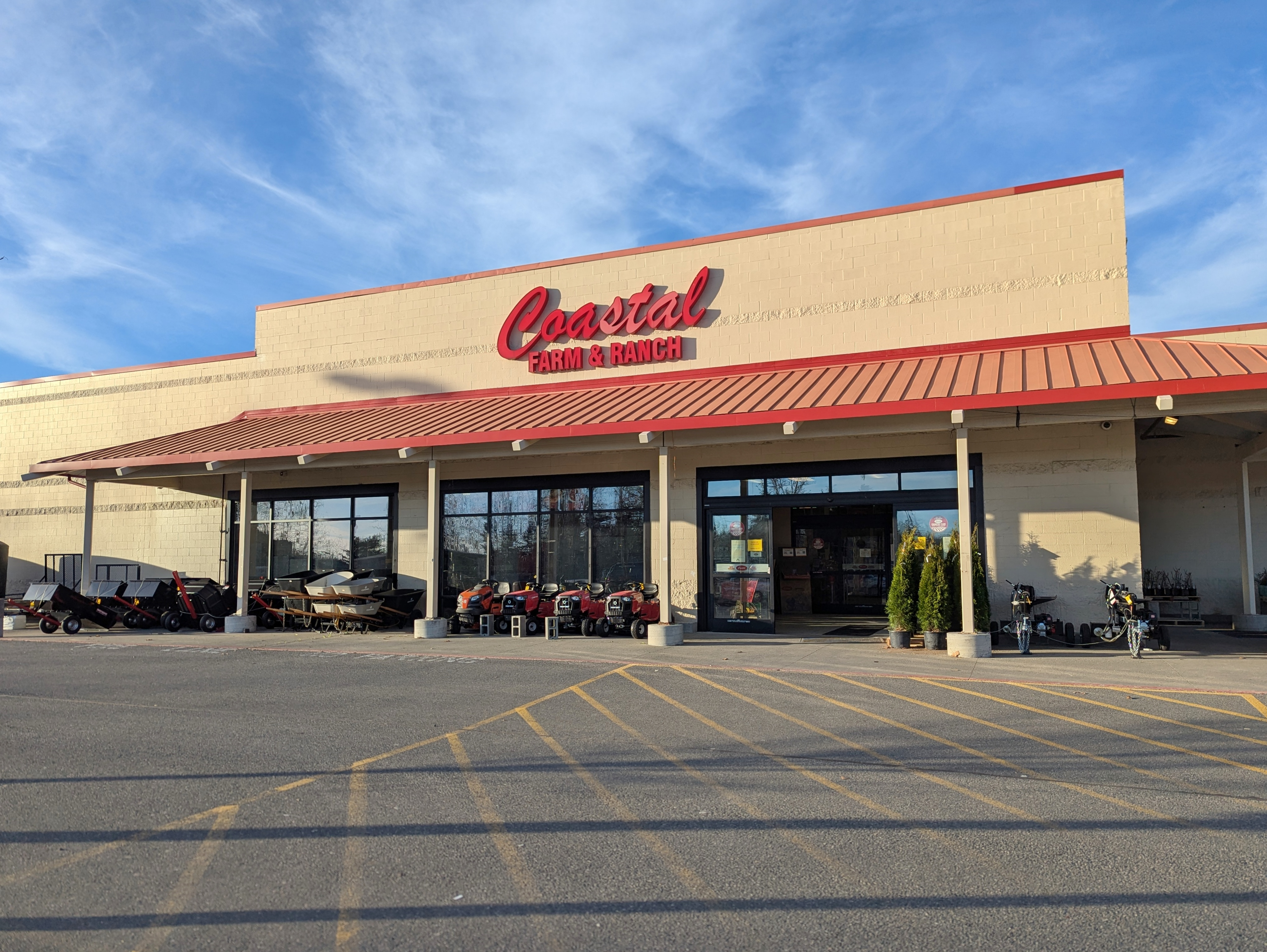
- A Coastal store in Mount Vernon, Washington
- Company type: Privately held
- Industry: Retail
- Founded: 1963 in Albany, Oregon, U.S.
- Headquarters: Albany, Oregon, U.S.
- Number of locations: 21 (2024)
- Area served: Pacific Northwest, U.S.
- Owner: Nolan Capital
- Website: coastalcountry.com

Coastal Farm & Ranch is an American retail company with 21 stores in the Pacific Northwest region. It primarily sells home improvement goods, farm and outdoor equipment, tools, and clothing for a rural clientele. The company was founded in 1963 and operated as a family-owned business until its acquisition by private equity firm Nolan Capital in 2022. Coastal also owns C-A-L Ranch, a chain of 33 stores in the Mountain states that it merged with in 2023.

== History ==
The Coastal Farm and Home Supply store was opened in June 1963 by Maurice Hale as part of a 200-store national chain of wholesale farm supply stores. Hale expanded the chain to three stores—all in the Willamette Valley of Oregon—before he sold the company to Missouri-based Orscheln Farm & Home. Coastal was sold in 1990 to Buzz Wheeler, a former farm store manager from Nebraska who had moved to Oregon, in a leveraged buyout. Wheeler expanded the chain to six stores within a decade and opened a location in Yakima, Washington, their first outside of Oregon.

The original Coastal store in Albany, Oregon, was replaced by a new location and warehouse in August 2002 with 40,000 square feet (3,700 m^{2}) of space. The company had acquired the foreclosed county fairgrounds in Albany from the Linn County government in 1998 for $2.2 million and subdivided the land to be used by other retailers, including Costco. In 2004, Coastal opened their first store in the Portland metropolitan area at a former Emporium department store in Oregon City. Coastal acquired three Central Oregon stores from the Big R chain in February 2014 and had grown to 15 stores and 350 employees.

The company opened six new stores from 2014 to 2024 as it sought to compete with the expansion of national farm supply chains in the Pacific Northwest, including in suburban markets on the Interstate 5 corridor. Wheeler also attributed the growth of farm supply stores to the revival of urban chicken keeping in Northwestern cities, which had been permitted through new ordinances passed in the 2000s and 2010s. Coastal began holding seminars on raising chickens for their suburban clientele and periodically supplied free chicks to customers who purchased feed. In December 2021, Wheeler announced that he had sold a majority stake in Coastal to Nolan Capital, a private equity firm based in California.

Coastal announced in January 2023 that it would merge with C-A-L Ranch, an Idaho-based chain with 33 stores in the Mountain states of the Western U.S. The two chains serve a similar market in their respective regions and would retain their separate branding in the combined 54-store company. C-A-L Ranch was founded in 1959 in Idaho Falls, Idaho, by three members of the Murphy family, who used their first initials for the company's name.

== Locations ==
As of 2024, Coastal Farm & Ranch has 21 locations in the U.S. states of Oregon and Washington. Select locations also include an in-store veterinary clinic, named Good Neighbor Vet, that also operates mobile services. C-A-L Ranch has 33 stores in Arizona, Idaho, Nevada, and Utah. The stores sell farm equipment, sporting goods, tools, auto supplies, and clothing; the inventory varies by location to suit local needs. The company's headquarters are at its store and distribution center in Albany, Oregon.
