= River Rhythms (Oregon) =

- Address: United States
- Type: Music

River Rhythms is a free outdoor music concert series, held Thursday evenings in July and August, at Monteith Riverpark along the Willamette and Calapooia Rivers in downtown Albany, Oregon.

== History ==
River Rhythms was started in 1984 and showcases a wide variety of musical entertainment. This event, along with the ATI Wah Chang Northwest Art & Air Festival, are two of Albany's signature events.

There were no concerts in 2020.
