= Albany Research Center =

Federal research center in Albany, Oregon

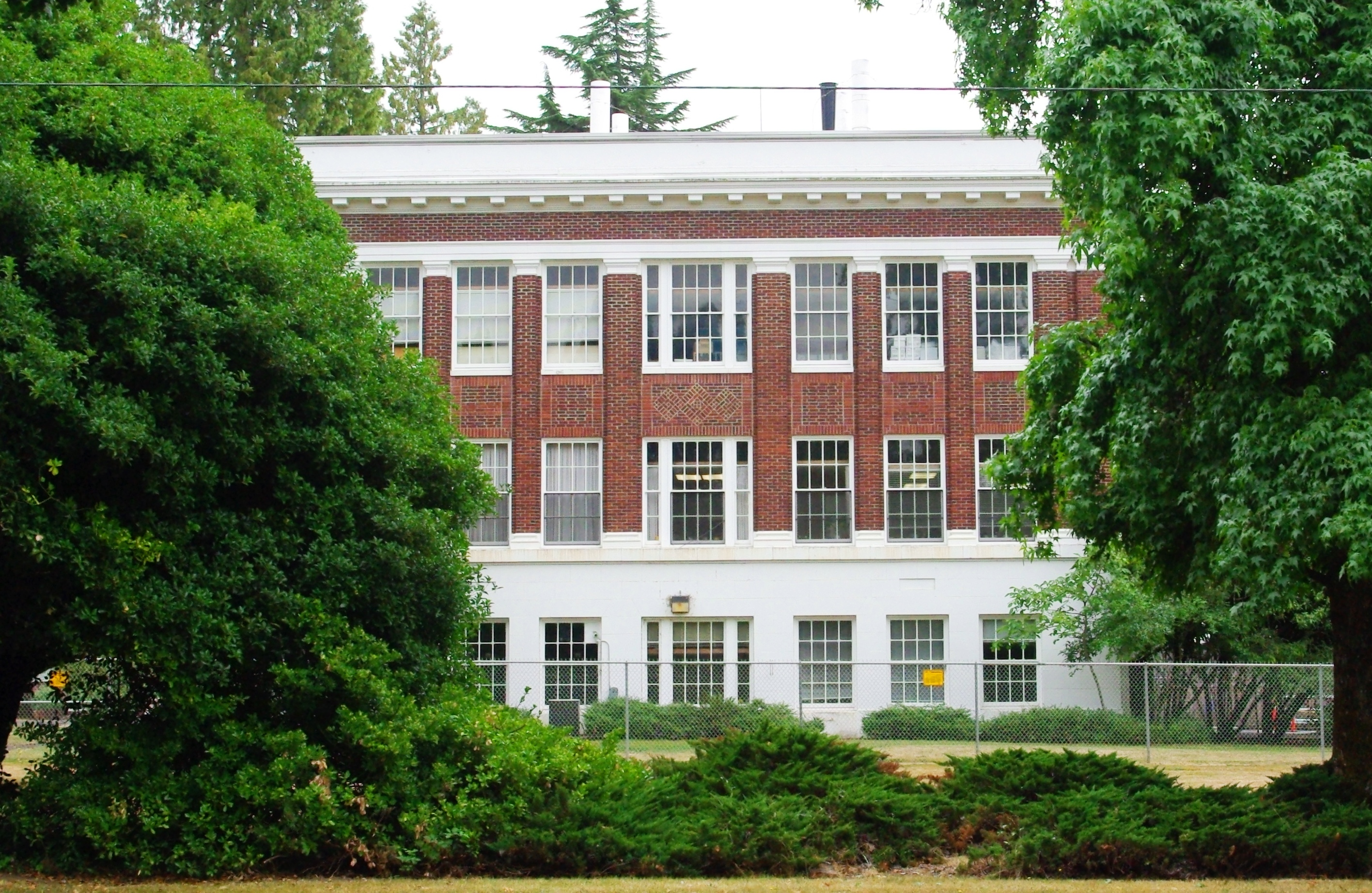
- Established: 1943
- Research type: Fossil energy
- Field of research: GIS, materials, refinery, MHD
- Staff: 120
- Location: Albany, Oregon, USA; 44°37′13″N 123°7′14″W
- Campus: 44 acres (0.18 km^{2})
- Affiliations: National Energy Technology Laboratory
- Operating agency: U.S. Department of Energy
- Website: netl.doe.gov

The Albany Research Center, now part of National Energy Technology Laboratory (NETL), is a U.S. Department of Energy laboratory staffed by Federal employees and contractors located in Albany, Oregon. Founded in 1943, the laboratory initially specialized in life cycle research starting with the formulation, characterization, and/or melting of most metals, alloys, and ceramics; casting and fabrication, prototype development; and the recycle and remediation of waste streams associated with these processes. Researchers at the laboratory routinely solved industrial processing problems by investigating melting, casting, fabrication, physical and chemical analysis and wear, corrosion and performance testing of materials through the use of equipment and analytical techniques. Since joining NETL, the laboratory has switched its research focus mainly to materials and processes for fossil energy production and conversion. The facility rests on 44 acres (18 ha) and occupies 38 buildings.

== History ==
The United States Bureau of Mines selected a location in Albany to be home to the Northwest Electro-development Laboratory on March 17, 1943. The grounds of the center and some buildings had been the home of Albany College (now Lewis & Clark College) from 1925 until 1937. The facility was planned to develop new metallurgical processes as well as study ways to use low-grade resources using the surplus of electricity in the region.

In 1945 the name was changed to the Albany Metallurgy Research Center, and William J. Kroll was hired to scale up his titanium process. By 1947 it had successfully produced two tons of titanium sponge, which is typically melted down to produce ingots or standard geometrical shapes.

Research at the facility in the early years included studying zirconium, which led to advances in producing ductile zirconium under Kroll, who used a similar process to his own because of the similarity in electronic structure between Ti and Zr. This interested the Navy and the Atomic Energy Commission who were developing the USS Nautilus (SSN-571) the first nuclear-powered submarine, because Zr had been selected to line the reactor vessel. In 1955, production of zirconium at the research center stopped when it was taken over by private industry. Other work at Albany included research on titanium casting, recycling metals and alloys, creating sulfurcrete, and studying metal corrosion among other areas.

The center was renamed as the Albany Research Center in 1977, and in 1985 it was listed by the American Society for Metals as a historical landmark. During the mid-1990s until the mid-2000s, the center worked with the Oregon Department of Transportation on preventing corrosion on bridges exposed to salt water. In 1996, the United States Congress eliminated the Bureau of Mines, with the Albany facility then transferred to the U.S. Department of Energy. At first it reported directly to the department's Office of Fossil Energy, but in 2005 it was realigned under the National Energy Technology Laboratory with the name changing to NETL-Albany. At that time the research center had a staff of 85 people and an annual budget of $10 million. Though the research center began additional upgrades in 2009 to add on two new modular office complexes to the facility and bringing to total staff up to 120 people. During that same year the center received an R&D 100 Award from R&D Magazine.

=== FUSRAP cleanup ===
From 1945 until 1978, the Research Center was involved in working with radioactive materials, first for the Atomic Energy Commission and later for the Energy Research and Development Administration.

As part of Formerly Utilized Sites Remedial Action Program (FUSRAP) cleanup operations, a radiological survey was conducted of the site in 1985. Portions of 18 buildings and 37 exterior locations were designated as needing decontamination. The cleanup was done in two phases: Phase I from July 1987 to January 1988 and Phase II from August 1990 to April 1991. The hazardous waste material was sent to the Hanford Site for disposal. The site was certified to Department of Energy standards and guidelines for cleanup of residual radioactive contamination in 1993.

== Operations ==
In conjunction with the Office of Fossil Energy, the facility investigates many of the nation's challenges in the production and use of all types of fossil energy systems to include the need to produce new materials for the energy systems of tomorrow and to develop new methods to ameliorate the releases associated with these new systems. Three directorates of NETL's Research & Innovation Center are represented at the Albany site: Geological and Environmental Systems, Materials Engineering and Manufacturing, and Energy Conversion Engineering. Specific research is conducted on geographic information systems for fossil fuels, advanced alloys and ceramics for coal and natural gas power plants, and magnetohydrodynamic generators. Their facilities include a GIS visualization laboratory, fabrication plant, a melting and casting facility, and a MHD laboratory.
