= West Albany, Albany, Oregon =

Coordinates: 44.6150°N 123.1204°W

West Albany is a neighborhood of Albany, Oregon, United States. It includes the Fir Oaks subdivision.

== Fir Oaks ==
Established in 1948, the Fir Oaks Addition is a subdivision situated near Liberty Elementary School in the West Albany area of Albany, Oregon, United States. Its property includes 27th and 28th Avenue, Park Terrace SW, Lawnridge SW and part of Lakewood Drive. Guidelines for home development and ownership were laid out in the Fir Oaks Addition Charter. It mandated strict requirements to create a neighborhood affordable only for wealthy Albany residents. Developers chose the Ranch-style house as their common design module. Yet, these homes were not the regular 1000 square foot box plans that dominated domestic architecture during this post-World War II period. They were larger versions, of the Split-Level Ranch, Raised Ranch or California Ranch styles that offered more square footage.

In the 1960s, new home owners in Fir Oaks chose new customized designs that differed from the Ranch-style. These new designs filled up the vacant lots among the neighborhood's existing Ranch-style homes. The last lot was sold in the mid-1970s.

=== History ===
==== Rural country ====
In 1945, Albany's city boundary extended from the downtown region along the Willamette River out toward 10th street. The area surrounding it, known as "rural country," was farmland. A farm located south of the Bureau of Mines became the new property for the Fir Oaks Addition in 1948. Owned by John Elbert Elder and his wife Beatrice, the lot included land around Oak Creek and the land located westward near the creek's end at the Calapooia River. Not much is known about the Elder family. A small creek off of Oak Creek and a house located in Albany's Monteith Historic District carry the name of Cathey Elder after one of their decedents; city records provide nothing else.

==== Charter ====
The Fir Oaks Addition Charter of 1948 is an example of charters written for housing developments created to segregate race and social classes. The major requirements laid out by the Fir Oaks Addition Charter are listed below:

- Each lot must be a minimum of half an acre
- Each home must have street frontage of at least 150 feet
- Each home must have a minimum selling cost of $12,500
- No subdividing within a property lot
- No African American owners allowed

According to the U.S. Census Bureau, the average home in Oregon cost $8,500 in 1950 while the Fir Oaks Addition Charter required $12,500 or more for homes. The average annual cost of living for the state was $3,000. The higher cost creates a limitation then for owners who did not have an income higher than the state average. Population: 1.565 In 1914, Frederick Law Olmsted Jr. adopted deed restrictions to prohibit Mexican-Americans from becoming owners in his development of Spanish colonial houses located in Palos Verdes, California. Later in 1923, developer J.C. Nichols built a Country Club District restricting billboards and African-American owners close to Kansas City. This form of "exclusivity" as Dolores Hayden calls it in her book Building Suburbia, she claims was common among developers, especially in the 1950s. The industry boom, after World War II in 1946, produced a consumer culture that wanted everything to be bigger and better. White-collar and upper-middle-class families wanted to live in big houses among prosperous neighbors, developers helped to make this so.

Many original owners or their immediate descendants still reside in the Fir Oaks Addition, according to the 2000 census, meaning that the neighborhood has remained predominantly Caucasian.
