= Linn County Courthouse (Oregon) =

Courthouse in Albany, Oregon, U.S.

Coordinates: 44.63447°N 123.10686°W

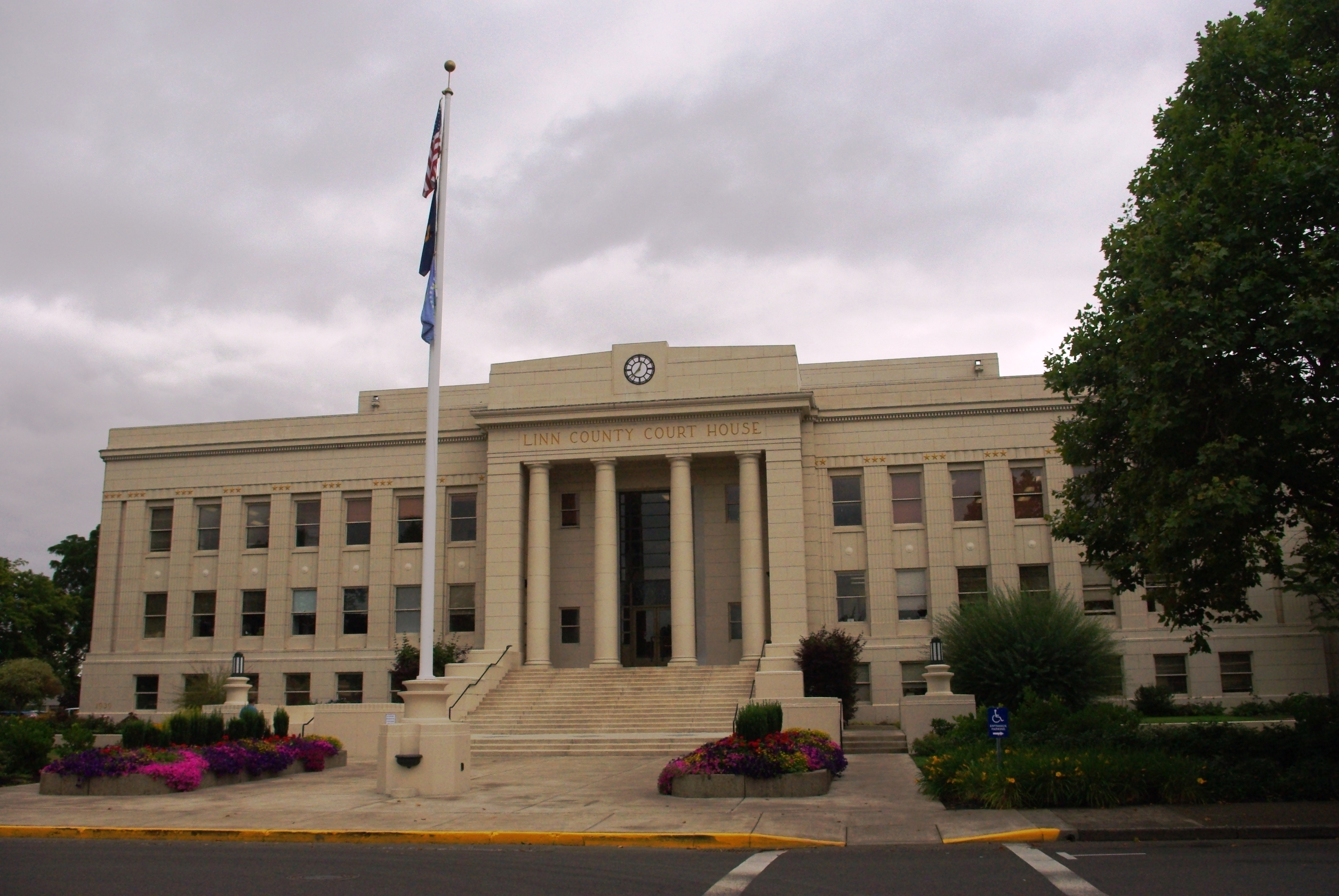
Linn County courthouse in Albany

The Linn County Courthouse is located at 300 SW 4th Avenue in Albany, Oregon, United States. In 1851, the Oregon Territorial Legislature passed an act establishing Albany as the county seat.

The original county courthouse was erected in Albany in 1853 but was destroyed by fire in 1861. A second courthouse was built in the same area in 1865. The present courthouse was constructed in 1940, adjacent to the earlier structures.

Current county officials within the courthouse include three commissioners, district attorney, assessor, clerk, sheriff, surveyor, and treasurer.

Linn County's courthouse serves as the workplace of Oregon's 23rd Judicial District (the circuit courts of Linn County).
