= South Albany High School =

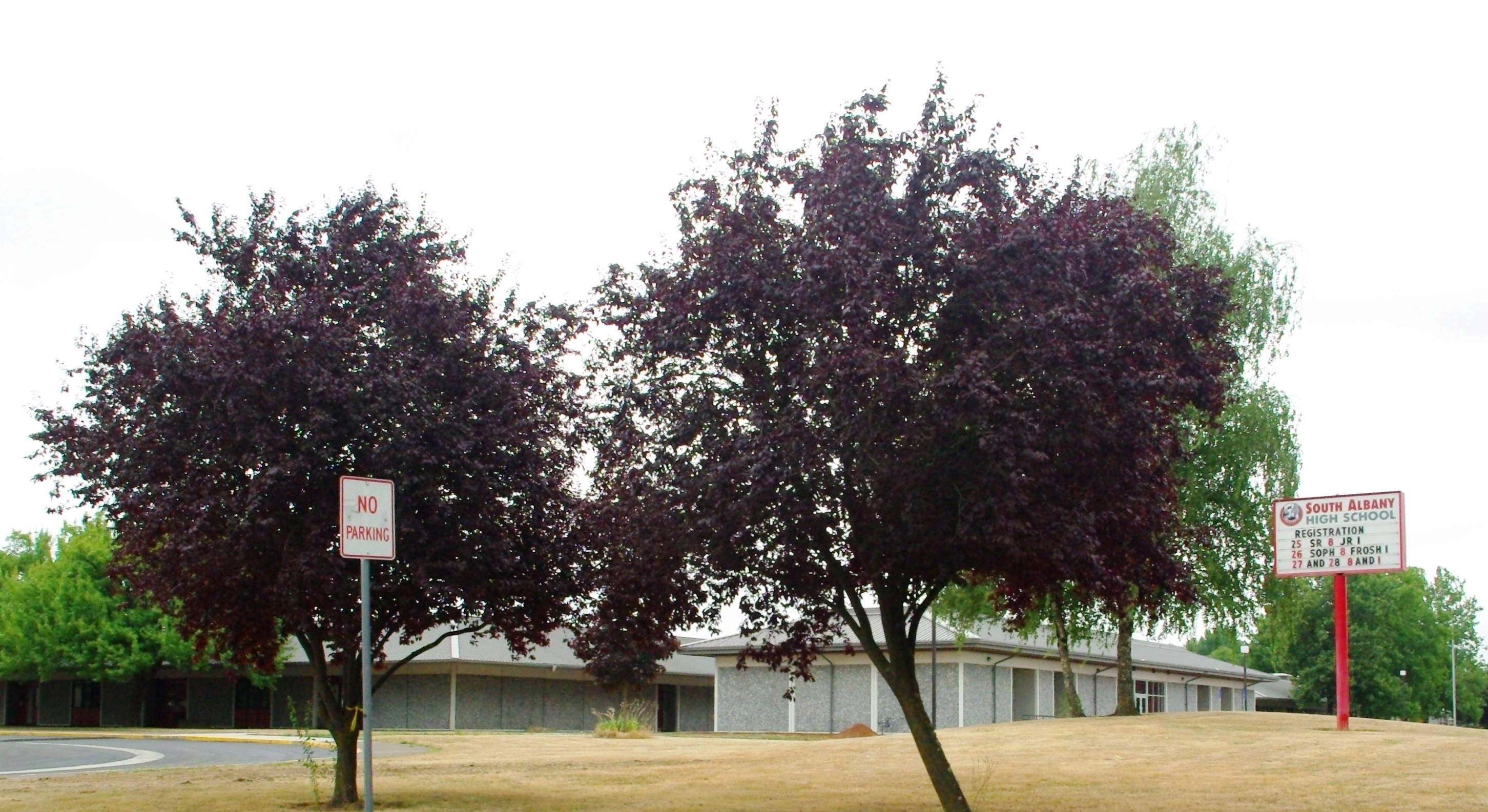

Location
- 3705 Columbus SE; Albany, (Linn County), Oregon 97322; United States; 44.607777°N 123.077778°W

Information
- Type: Public
- Motto: Sapere Aude and “Take FLIGHT”: Family, Learning, Inclusion, Growth, Hope, Transformation
- Opened: 1971
- School district: Greater Albany Public School District
- Principal: Chad Angel
- Teaching staff: NA for 2026–2027 (on an FTE basis)
- Grades: 9-12
- Enrollment: 1,511 (2023–2024)
- Student to teacher ratio: NA for 2026–2027
- Campus: Suburban
- Colors: Red and Gray
- Athletics conference: OSAA 5A-3 Mid-Willamette Conference
- Mascot: Rowdy RedHawk
- Team name: RedHawks
- Newspaper: The South Albany Sentry
- Website: http://sahs.albany.k12.or.us/

South Albany High School (SAHS) is a public high school located in Albany, Oregon, United States. Built in 1970, South Albany occupies the largest facility in the Greater Albany Public School District, encompassing more than 167,000 square feet (15,500 m^{2}) of classrooms and other facilities with its outdoor campus.

== History ==
After splitting from Albany Union High School in 1971, students who were entering as Seniors that year were given the choice to stay and graduate from Albany Union or go to South Albany High School and be part of the first graduating class from there. The school chose "Rebel" as their mascot; athletic teams were nicknamed "The Rebels”. The Rebel was removed and changed to the RedHawks on April 25, 2018. The school's colors are red and grey and were not changed when the mascot was changed.

=== Arson incident ===
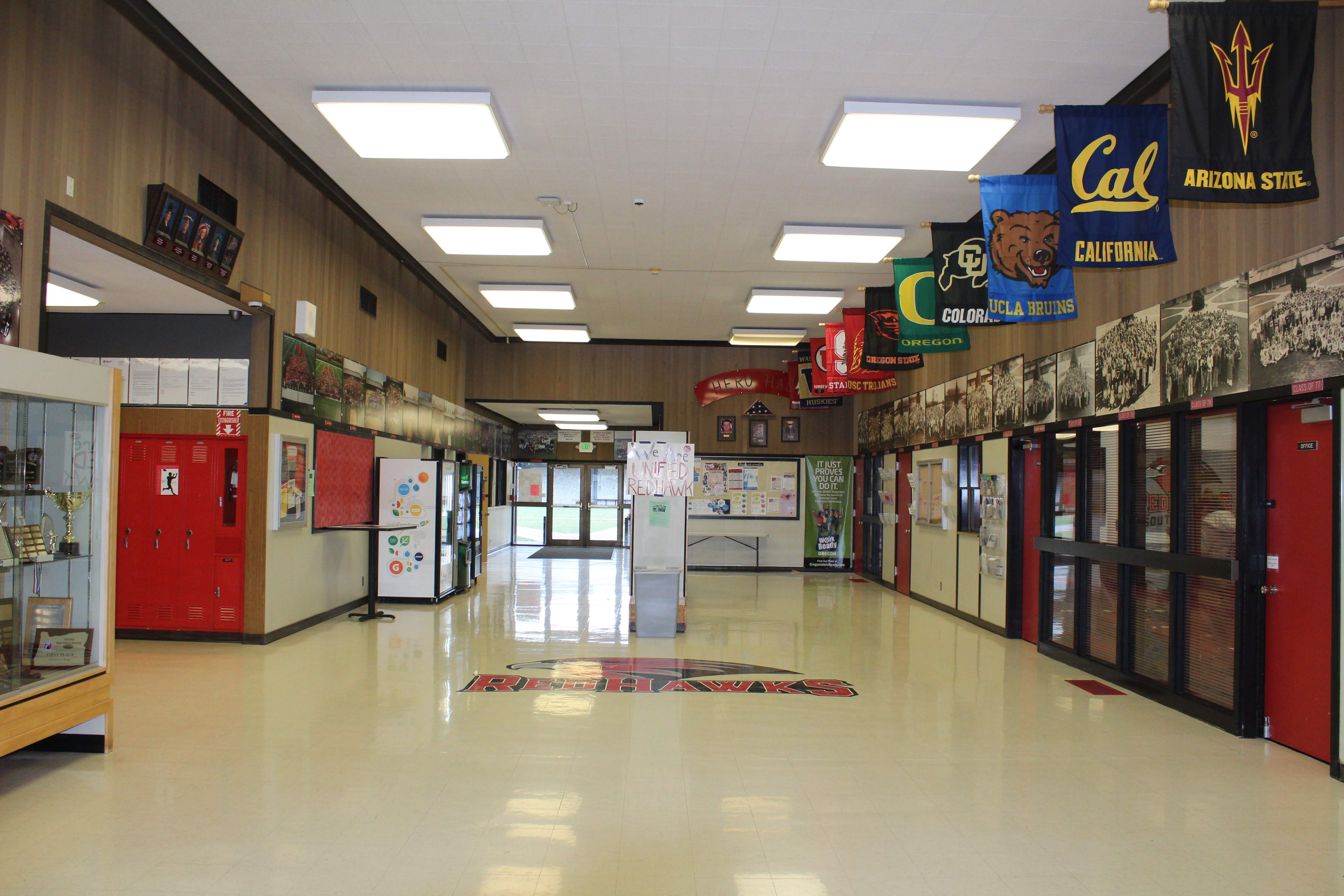
Inside the main office building.

On April 1, 2015, classes were canceled for the following days due to a large fire that had destroyed the school's choir room, cooking classrooms, band room, and cafeteria, but school was resumed the following week. By 7 a.m., snorkel water cannons were being used to prevent the four-alarm fire from spreading to the rest of the school. The man who had set the fire, Zachary Lee Burghart, was convicted a few months later for arson after pleading guilty.

== Academics ==
In 2008, 75% of the school's seniors received a high school diploma. Of 308 students, 231 graduated, 42 dropped out, 13 received a modified diploma, and 22 were still in high school the following year. By 2018, 88% of the 302 seniors graduated. Twenty-eight students dropped out that year.

In 2022 84% of the school's seniors received a high school diploma. Of 315 students, 268 graduated, and 47 dropped out.

South Albany High School offers nine Advanced Placement (AP) courses and opportunities for college credit through Linn-Benton Community College.

== Athletics ==
South Albany High School athletic teams compete in the OSAA 5A-3 Mid-Willamette Conference. In 2024 the volleyball team won the schools first sports state championship, winning the championship final against league rival Crescent Valley High School.

State championships:

- Cheerleading: 2016, 2017, 2018, 2019, 2020
- Dance/Drill: 1989, 1991, 1992, 1993, 1997, 2001, 2002, 2014, 2015, 2017
- Volleyball: 2024, 2025
