= Northwest Art and Air Festival =

The Northwest Art and Air Festival is an annual festival in Albany, Oregon, United States that celebrates local art and aeronautics. The Oregon Festival and Events Association has twice named the festival "best in its budget class" and in recent years the festival has averaged 40,000 visitors during the course of the event. In 2008 festival attendance was described by city officials as "the biggest by far".

The Northwest Art and Air Festival was conceived in August 2000. It is run by Albany Parks & Recreation and the Albany Visitors Association, and is sponsored by a local aerospace alloy manufacturing company, ATI Wah Chang. It suffered its only cancellation: in 2020.

Locations include Timber Linn Park and the Albany Municipal Airport.

== Art ==
Over 70 artists from Oregon showcase their work. Art includes, pottery and ceramics, wood furniture and woodworking, jewelry, lotions and soaps, painting, photography, rugs, and toys.

== Music ==
Music is performed on two stages with notable acts appearing in the Oregon Amphitheater on Saturday night. Past acts have included Joan Baez, Los Lobos, Johnny Rivers, Christopher Cross and, in 2008, Little River Band.

== Air ==
The Albany Municipal Airport hosts a variety of events including a display from the U.S. Army of a Blackhawk helicopter. Local pilots instruct children from ages 8 through 17 on the basics of flight through a 20-minute instruction session called Young Eagles, which ends in a 20-minute airplane ride over the Willamette Valley. Airplane and helicopter flights are offered. Radio controlled airplanes are put out for display. Ultralights, experimental aircraft and small jet planes are present and flying.

=== Balloons ===
A signature production of the Northwest Art and Air Festival is said to be its "Night Glow" hot air balloon lighting. At dusk in Timber Linn Park, balloons ignite their engines—this illuminates the balloons like giant nightlights. The show is coordinated to music and in 2008 added a laser light show.

In the early morning on Friday, Saturday, and Sunday, at least forty balloons are launched. Spectators are allowed to get close to the balloons as they fill and get ready to launch. Rides are available for a fee.

== See also ==
- Hot air balloon festivals
