= Albany, Oregon =

City in Oregon, United States

Albany, Oregon Takenah (Kalapuya)
- City
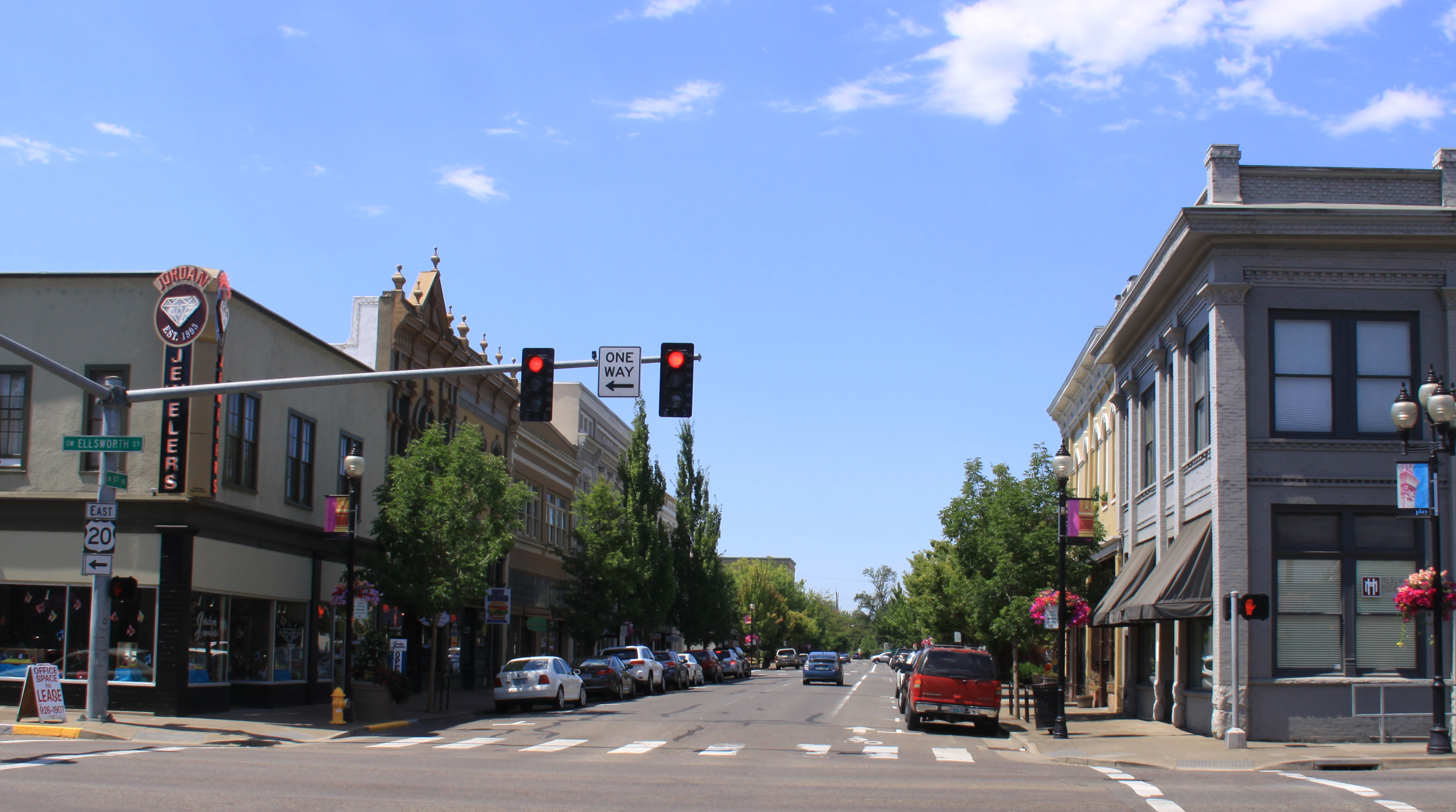
- Looking west down 1st Avenue SW in downtown Albany

- Flag Seal
- Nickname(s): Hub of the Valley, Grass Seed Capital, Rare Metals Capital
- Mottoes: The center of the Willamette Valley; the heart of Oregon
- Location in Oregon

- Location in Oregon Location in the United States
- Coordinates: 44°37′49″N 123°05′48″W
- Country: United States
- State: Oregon
- Counties: Linn, Benton
- Incorporated: 1864

Government
  - Type: Council-Manager
  - Mayor: Alex Johnson II (NP)

Area
  - City: 17.86 sq mi (46.27 km^{2})
  - Land: 17.66 sq mi (45.73 km^{2})
  - Water: 0.21 sq mi (0.54 km^{2})
  - Urban: 22 sq mi (56 km^{2})
- Elevation: 226 ft (69 m)

Population (2020)
  - City: 56,472
  - Density: 3,198.1/sq mi (1,234.81/km^{2})
  - Urban: 62,074(US: 439th)
  - Metro: 128,610 (US: 315th)

GDP
  - Metro: $6.442 billion (2023)
- Time zone: UTC−8 (Pacific)
  - Summer (DST): UTC−7 (Pacific)
- ZIP codes: 97321-97322
- Area codes: 541, 458
- FIPS code: 41-01000
- GNIS feature ID: 2409675
- Website: albanyoregon.gov

Albany (/ˈælbəni/ AL-bə-nee) is a city in and the county seat of Linn County, Oregon, and is the 11th most populous city in the state. Albany is located in the Willamette Valley at the confluence of the Calapooia River and the Willamette River in both Linn and Benton counties, just east of Corvallis and south of Salem. It is predominantly a farming and manufacturing city that settlers founded around 1848. As of the 2020 United States census, the population of Albany, Oregon was 56,472.

Albany has a home rule charter, a council–manager government, and a full-time unelected city manager. The city provides the population with access to over 30 parks and trails, a senior center, and many cultural events such as the Northwest Art & Air Festival, River Rhythms, Summer Sounds and Movies at Monteith. In addition to farming and manufacturing, the city's economy depends on retail trade, health care, and social assistance. In recent years the city has worked to revive the downtown shopping area, with help from the Central Albany Revitalization Area.

== History ==
In the historical era, the area of the Willamette Valley that makes up modern-day Albany was inhabited by one of the tribes of the Kalapuya, a Penutian-speaking, Native American people. The Kalapuya had named the area Takenah, a Kalapuyan word used to describe the deep pool at the confluence of the Calapooia and Willamette rivers. A variation of the place name can also be written as Tekenah.

The Kalapuya population in the valley was between 4,000 and 20,000 before contact with Europeans, but they suffered high mortality from new infectious diseases introduced shortly afterward. The tribes were devastated by a smallpox epidemic that raged through the Pacific Northwest in 1782–83. A malaria outbreak swept through the region between 1830 and 1833. It is estimated that as many as 90 percent of the Kalapuya population died during this period. That, coupled with the treaties signed during the 1850s by the Kalapuya to cede land to the United States, left the area nearly free for European Americans to settle.

=== 19th century ===
Originally a farmer from Iowa, Abner Hackleman arrived as the first European American settler in 1845. Taking up a land claim for himself, Hackleman asked Hiram N. Smead to hold another for him until his son arrived from Iowa. In 1846, a year after arriving in Oregon, Hackleman died while returning to Iowa to fetch his family. In 1847 a pair of brothers, Walter and Thomas Monteith, settled in the area, after traveling by ox team along the Oregon Trail from their native state of New York. They were a family of early prominence in the area; in 1848, they bought a claim of 320 acres (1.3 km^{2}) from Hiram Smead for $400 and a horse; they plotted out 60 acres (240,000 m^{2}) for the town site. They named the city "Albany" after their hometown of Albany in New York. During the same period, Hackleman's son Abram reached his father's original land claim and built a log house in an oak grove still known as Hackleman's Grove. He later built a house, which still stands at the corner of Fifth and Jackson. The small settlement that formed on the Hackleman land became known as the community of Takenah in 1849.

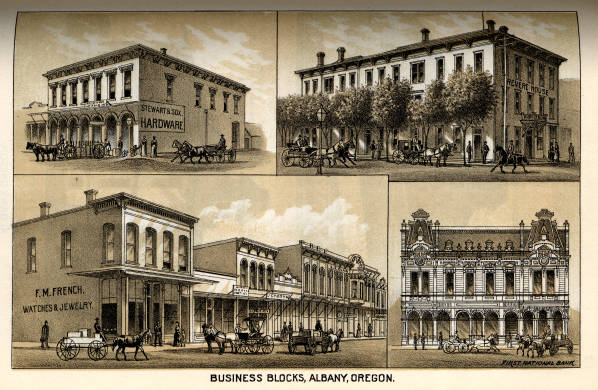
Albany, Oregon, 1887

During this early period, the Monteith and Hackleman families were literally and politically on opposite sides of the fence. Residents in the Monteiths' portion of town were mainly Yankee merchants and professionals from the Upper Midwest and New England, who aligned with the Republican Party. They tended to sympathize with the Union during the Civil War. The residents in Hackleman's portion of town to the east were made up mostly of working-class Democrats from the Upland South/Lower Midwest who were split between supporting the Union and the Confederacy. The two sides planted a hedge near Baker Street separating their sides of town.

With help from Samuel Althouse, the Monteiths built the first frame house in Albany in 1849. The Monteith House was considered the finest house in Oregon at the time. That same year the start of the California Gold Rush had caught the attention of the Monteith brothers, who provided supplies to the gold fields; their profits were seed money for several new businesses in Albany, including the general store. After the Monteiths developed these businesses, Albany became a major hub city in the Willamette Valley.

Albany's first school was established in 1851 by the town's first physician, R. C. Hill. The first school teacher was Eleanor B. Hackleman, wife of Abram Hackleman. It was not until 1855 that a building was specifically erected for use as a school. In 1852, the first steamboat, the Multnomah, arrived and the first flour mill was built.

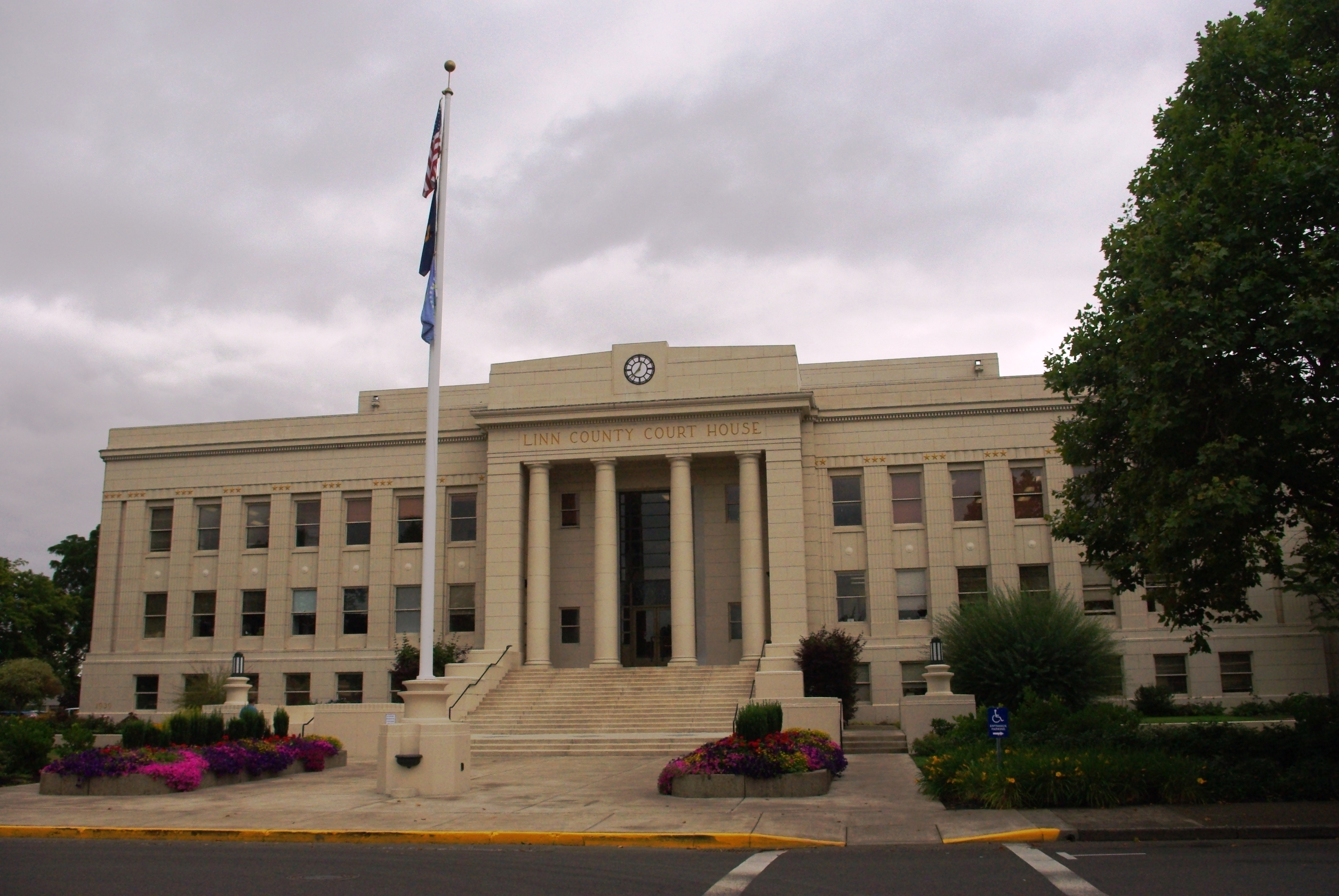
Linn County courthouse in Albany

On January 8, 1850, a U.S. post office was established in Albany, with John Burkhart appointed as the first U.S. Postmaster. The town was renamed as "New Albany" on November 4, 1850, but the name was changed back to Albany in 1853. In 1851, Albany was designated as the county seat, replacing Calapooia (near modern-day Brownsville and Sweet Home), and all court meetings were held there. The first Albany courthouse was built in 1852 on 10 acres (4.0 ha) of land donated by the Monteiths to ensure Albany would remain the county seat. The new two-story octagonal courthouse was completed on April 26, 1853. The courthouse has since been replaced, but the new courthouse stands on the same site.

During 1853–1854, residents of the east side of Albany persuaded the Oregon Legislative Assembly to name both towns Takenah. Though Takenah meant "deep pool," in reference to the confluence of the Calapooia and Willamette rivers, it was commonly translated as "Hole in the Ground". Partially due to this translation, the legislature restored the name Albany to the town in 1855. Finally in 1864, 16 years after the Monteiths founded the town and 19 years after the first European Americans arrived, it became incorporated as a city.

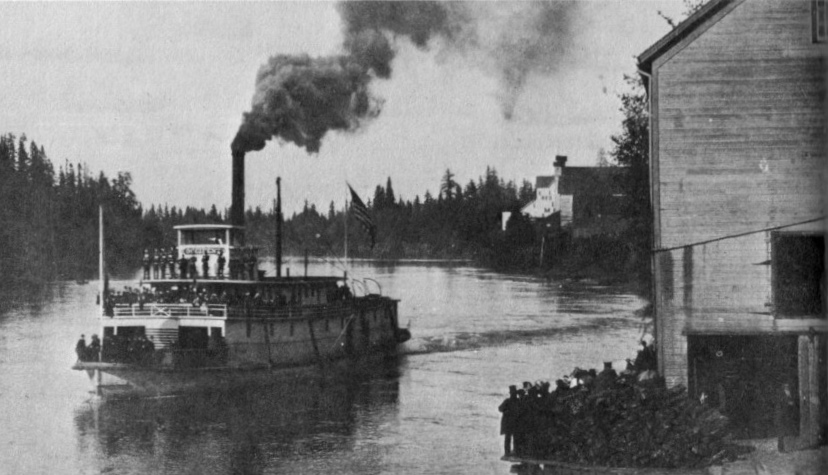
Sidewheel steamboat Occident, at Albany, near Red Crown Mills

View of bucolic Albany during the 1880s

In 1871, the trains first reached Albany, connecting it to other towns in the valley. The arrival of the first train was celebrated as the greatest event in Albany's history. Albany businessmen raised $50,000 to ensure that the rails would be built through the city, instead of bypassing it a few miles eastward. The train brought the farmers' markets closer to the city, as stagecoaches and steamboats gave way to the railroad. The world's longest wooden railroad drawbridge was built in 1888 for the Albany-Corvallis run. By 1910, 28 passenger trains departed daily from Albany going in five directions.

In 1872, the Santiam Ditch and Canal Company was organized, and a canal running from the Santiam near Lebanon was completed that autumn. The canal runs 18 miles (29 km) from the south side of Albany and divides at the corner of Vine and Eight streets, with one branch running down Vine Street and emptying into Calapooia Creek, with a drop of 32 feet (9.8 m). The other runs down Eighth to Thurston Street.

=== 20th century ===
In 1924 Pacific Power installed a turbine where the canal meets the river to generate electricity. In 1984 the city bought the water system from Pacific Power, and shut down the plant in 1991. By 2003 the city had approved a plan to restart the four megawatt-hour hydroelectric plant and in February 2009 the plant opened again. Albany was the headquarters for the Mountain States Power Company from its establishment in 1918 until its merger into Pacific Power & Light (now PacifiCorp) in 1954.

In the 1940s, the city started the Albany World Championship Timber Carnival, which drew competitors from all over the world to participate in logging skills contests. The event took place over the four days of the Fourth of July weekend. Men and women would compete in climbing, chopping, bucking, and burling contests. In 2001 the carnival was cancelled because of smaller crowds and the state's declining timber economy.

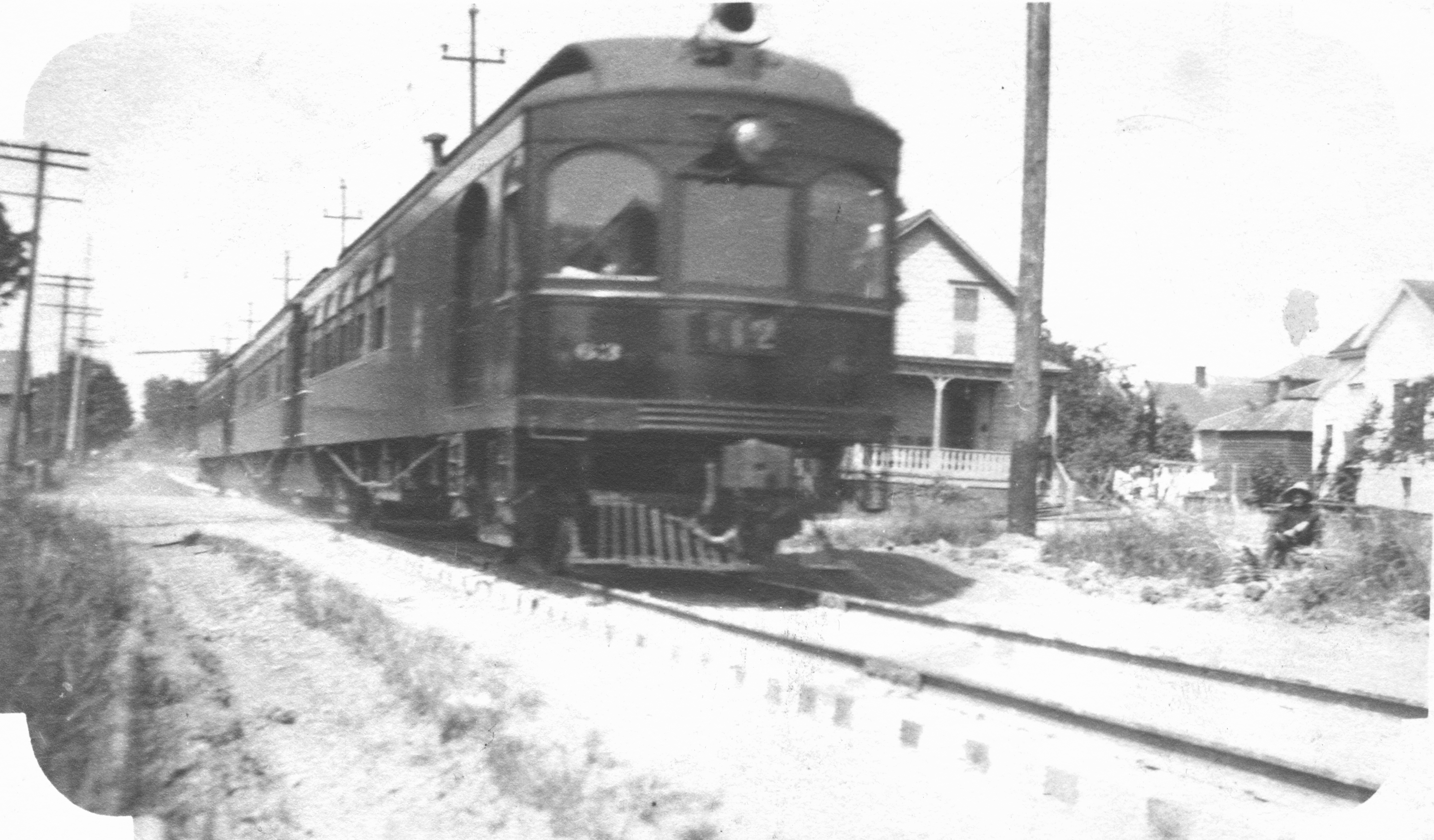
An Oregon Electric Railway train passing through Albany, Oregon, c. 1910s

In 1916 Kuo-Ching Li, a Chinese-American engineer, founded Wah Chang Trading Corporation in New York State, but it was based in Albany. He developed it as an international tungsten ore and concentrate trading company, leading the company until his death in 1961. He served as president until 1960 and then board chairman.

The U.S. Bureau of Mines established Albany Research Center (ARC) on the former Albany College campus in 1942, focusing on the development of new metallurgical processes. First known as the Northwest Electro-development Facility, the site eventually produced titanium and zirconium, spearheaded by William Justin Kroll whom the bureau hired in 1945. The first zirconium strip was rolled out there in August 1946. In 1951, William Kroll joined the faculty of Oregon State College, ten miles away in Corvallis.

The ARC fostered the growth of a new rare metals industry in Albany, led by internationally recognized companies such as the Oregon Metallurgical Company, Oremet, and Wah Chang. In the 1970s, Albany attempted to extend its city limits to include a zirconium processing plant of Wah Chang Corporation in order to increase its industrial tax base. Wah Chang responded in 1974 by sponsoring a vote to incorporate the desired properties as Millersburg.

When the Bureau of Mines closed in 1996, the ARC was transferred to the United States Department of Energy's Office of Fossil Energy. In 2005 the facility became part of the National Energy Technology Laboratory.

== Geography ==
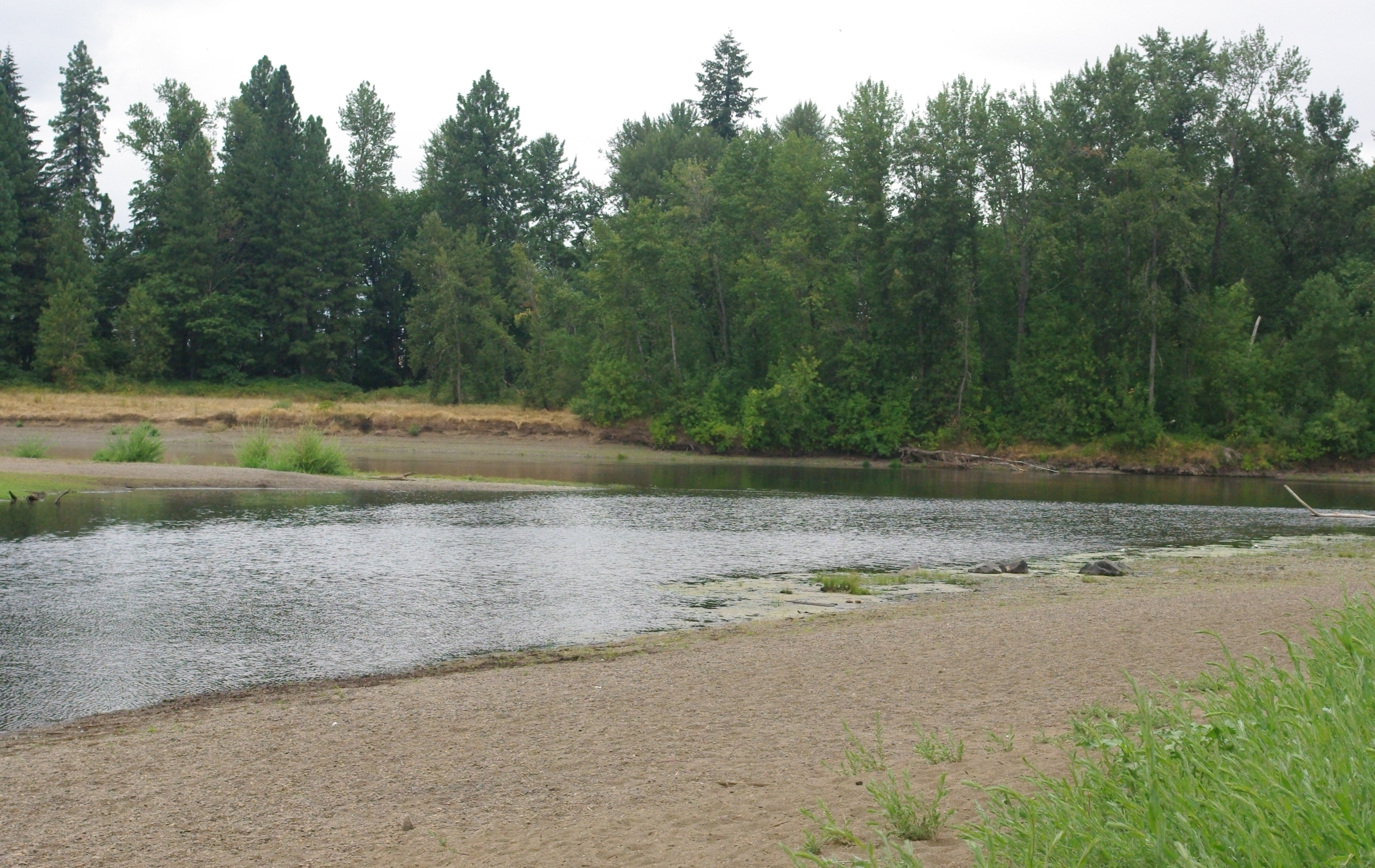
Calapooia River at Albany

Albany is in the central part of Oregon's most populated region, the Willamette Valley. The city rests along the confluence of the Calapooia and Willamette rivers, and although most of Albany falls within Linn County, a smaller portion of the city rests to the north of its downtown on the west bank of the Willamette River in Benton County.

According to the United States Census Bureau, the city has a total area of 17.75 square miles (45.97 km^{2}), of which 17.54 square miles (45.43 km^{2}) is land and 0.21 square miles (0.54 km^{2}) is water. Albany has 21.7 square miles (56 km^{2}) within its urban growth boundary. Throughout the city limits and urban growth area, there are limited hills; the city is one of the lowest points along the Willamette Valley, with elevations ranging 180 to 430 feet (55 to 131 m) above sea level. The North Albany district has the most variable elevation, while the downtown and southern end of town have little elevation change throughout.

=== Climate ===
Similar to the majority of Western Oregon, Albany's weather is considered to be mild. Albany has generally warm and dry summers during which precipitation drops to 0.4 inches (10 mm) in July and temperatures peak at an average of 80.8 °F (27 °C) in August. The record high temperature in Albany was 110 °F (43 °C) on June 27 during the 2021 Western North America heat wave. Winters in Albany are cool and wet. The month with the most precipitation is December with 6.8 inches (170 mm). The coldest month is January, with an average low just above freezing at 33.6 °F (1 °C). The record low temperature was recorded in 1972 at −7 °F (−22 °C).

Albany and the surrounding area was left devastated by the Columbus Day Storm of October 1962.

Climate data for Albany, Oregon
Month	Jan	Feb	Mar	Apr	May	Jun	Jul	Aug	Sep	Oct	Nov	Dec	Year
Record high °F (°C)	68 (20)	71 (22)	81 (27)	91 (33)	95 (35)	111 (44)	106 (41)	106 (41)	100 (38)	90 (32)	73 (23)	65 (18)	111 (44)
Mean maximum °F (°C)	57.7 (14.3)	61.6 (16.4)	69.8 (21.0)	78.7 (25.9)	86.0 (30.0)	90.9 (32.7)	95.9 (35.5)	95.1 (35.1)	90.4 (32.4)	78.5 (25.8)	64.3 (17.9)	58.6 (14.8)	101.8 (38.8)
Mean daily maximum °F (°C)	46.2 (7.9)	50.2 (10.1)	56.5 (13.6)	60.2 (15.7)	68.4 (20.2)	73.7 (23.2)	82.6 (28.1)	83.1 (28.4)	75.8 (24.3)	64.7 (18.2)	53.5 (11.9)	46.5 (8.1)	63.5 (17.5)
Daily mean °F (°C)	39.9 (4.4)	42.3 (5.7)	46.7 (8.2)	50.4 (10.2)	56.7 (13.7)	61.5 (16.4)	67.9 (19.9)	67.9 (19.9)	61.8 (16.6)	53.6 (12.0)	45.7 (7.6)	40.7 (4.8)	52.9 (11.6)
Mean daily minimum °F (°C)	33.6 (0.9)	34.4 (1.3)	36.9 (2.7)	40.5 (4.7)	44.9 (7.2)	49.3 (9.6)	53.2 (11.8)	52.6 (11.4)	47.8 (8.8)	42.4 (5.8)	37.8 (3.2)	34.9 (1.6)	42.4 (5.8)
Mean minimum °F (°C)	22.6 (−5.2)	24.4 (−4.2)	28.3 (−2.1)	31.8 (−0.1)	34.7 (1.5)	40.6 (4.8)	44.9 (7.2)	44.8 (7.1)	38.7 (3.7)	31.2 (−0.4)	26.2 (−3.2)	21.6 (−5.8)	16.9 (−8.4)
Record low °F (°C)	−3 (−19)	−4 (−20)	13 (−11)	24 (−4)	29 (−2)	30 (−1)	38 (3)	36 (2)	29 (−2)	21 (−6)	10 (−12)	−8 (−22)	−8 (−22)
Average precipitation inches (mm)	6.16 (156)	4.98 (126)	4.36 (111)	2.49 (63)	2.17 (55)	1.33 (34)	0.39 (9.9)	0.50 (13)	1.72 (44)	3.38 (86)	6.10 (155)	6.31 (160)	39.89 (1,012.9)
Average snowfall inches (cm)	2.4 (6.1)	1.2 (3.0)	0.4 (1.0)	0.1 (0.25)	0.0 (0.0)	0.0 (0.0)	0.0 (0.0)	0.0 (0.0)	0.0 (0.0)	0.0 (0.0)	0.2 (0.51)	1.2 (3.0)	5.5 (13.86)
Average precipitation days	19	17	17	14	12	8	2	3	7	12	17	19	147
Source: WRCC

== Demographics ==
Historical population
Census	Pop.	Note	%±
1870	1,292		—
1880	1,867		44.5%
1890	3,079		64.9%
1900	3,149		2.3%
1910	4,275		35.8%
1920	4,840		13.2%
1930	5,325		10.0%
1940	5,654		6.2%
1950	10,115		78.9%
1960	12,926		27.8%
1970	18,181		40.7%
1980	26,546		46.0%
1990	29,462		11.0%
2000	40,852		38.7%
2010	50,158		22.8%
2020	56,472		12.6%
2024 (est.)	57,777		2.3%
Source: U.S. Decennial Census; 2018 Estimate

=== 2020 census ===
As of the 2020 census, Albany had a population of 56,472. The median age was 37.8 years, 36.5 for males and 39.0 for females. 22.3% of residents were under the age of 18 and 18.0% were 65 years of age or older. The gender makeup was 48.7% male and 51.3% female, which corresponds to 94.9 males for every 100 females overall and 92.2 males for every 100 females age 18 and over.

99.8% of residents lived in urban areas, while 0.2% lived in rural areas.

There were 22,157 households in Albany, of which 30.0% had children under the age of 18 living in them. Of all households, 46.2% were married-couple households, 17.4% were households with a male householder and no spouse or partner present, and 27.1% were households with a female householder and no spouse or partner present. About 26.7% of all households were made up of individuals and 12.5% had someone living alone who was 65 years of age or older.

There were 23,105 housing units, of which 4.1% were vacant. Among occupied housing units, 58.7% were owner-occupied and 41.3% were renter-occupied. The homeowner vacancy rate was 0.9% and the rental vacancy rate was 4.7%.

The racial makeup of the city was 79.5% White, 0.8% African American, 1.4% American Indian or Alaska Native, 1.8% Asian, 0.3% Native Hawaiian or Pacific Islander, 5.3% from other races, and 10.9% from two or more races; Hispanic or Latino residents of any race were 14.1% of the population.

Racial composition as of the 2020 census
Race	Number	Percent
White	44,871	79.5%
Black or African American	469	0.8%
American Indian and Alaska Native	807	1.4%
Asian	998	1.8%
Native Hawaiian and Other Pacific Islander	173	0.3%
Some other race	3,005	5.3%
Two or more races	6,149	10.9%
Hispanic or Latino (of any race)	7,949	14.1%

=== 2010 census ===
As of the census of 2010, there were 50,158 people, 19,705 households, and 12,894 families residing in the city. The population density was 2,859.6 inhabitants per square mile (1,104.1/km^{2}). There were 20,979 housing units at an average density of 1,196.1 per square mile (461.8/km^{2}). The racial makeup of the city was 87.8% White, 0.7% African American, 1.2% Native American, 1.4% Asian, 0.2% Pacific Islander, 5.2% from other races, and 3.6% from two or more races. Hispanic or Latino of any race were 11.4% of the population.

There were 19,705 households, of which 33.7% had children under the age of 18 living with them, 47.8% were married couples living together, 12.4% had a female householder with no husband present, 5.2% had a male householder with no wife present, and 34.6% were non-families. 26.7% of all households were made up of individuals, and 9.9% had someone living alone who was 65 years of age or older. The average household size was 2.50 and the average family size was 3.01.

The median age in the city was 35.6 years. 25% of residents were under the age of 18; 9.6% were between the ages of 18 and 24; 27.4% were from 25 to 44; 24.7% were from 45 to 64; and 13.1% were 65 years of age or older. The gender makeup of the city was 48.8% male and 51.2% female.

=== 2000 census ===
As of the census of 2000, there were 40,852 people, 16,108 households, and 10,808 families residing in the city. The population density was 2,571.8/sq mi. There were 17,374 housing units at an average density of 1,093.8 per square mile. The racial makeup of the city was 91.68% White, 0.53% African American, 1.22% Native American, 1.14% Asian, 0.21% Pacific Islander, 2.65% from other races, and 2.56% from two or more races. Hispanic or Latino of any race were 6.09% of the population.

There were 16,108 households, out of which 33.3% had children under the age of 18 living with them, 51.1% were married couples living together, 11.7% had a female householder with no husband present, and 32.9% were non-families. 26.1% of all households were made up of individuals, and 10.4% had someone living alone who was 65 years of age or older. The average household size was 2.49 and the average family size was 2.99.

In the city, the population was 26.4% under the age of 18, 9.6% from 18 to 24, 29.3% from 25 to 44, 21.9% from 45 to 64, and 12.7% who were 65 years of age or older. The median age was 35 years. For every 100 females, there were 94.5 males. For every 100 females age 18 and over, there were 91.7 males.

The median income for a household in the city was $39,409, and the median income for a family was $46,094. Males had a median income of $36,457 versus $24,480 for females. The per capita income for the city was $18,570. About 9.3% of families and 11.6% of the population were below the poverty line, including 14.1% of those under age 18 and 7.5% of those age 65 or over.

== Government ==
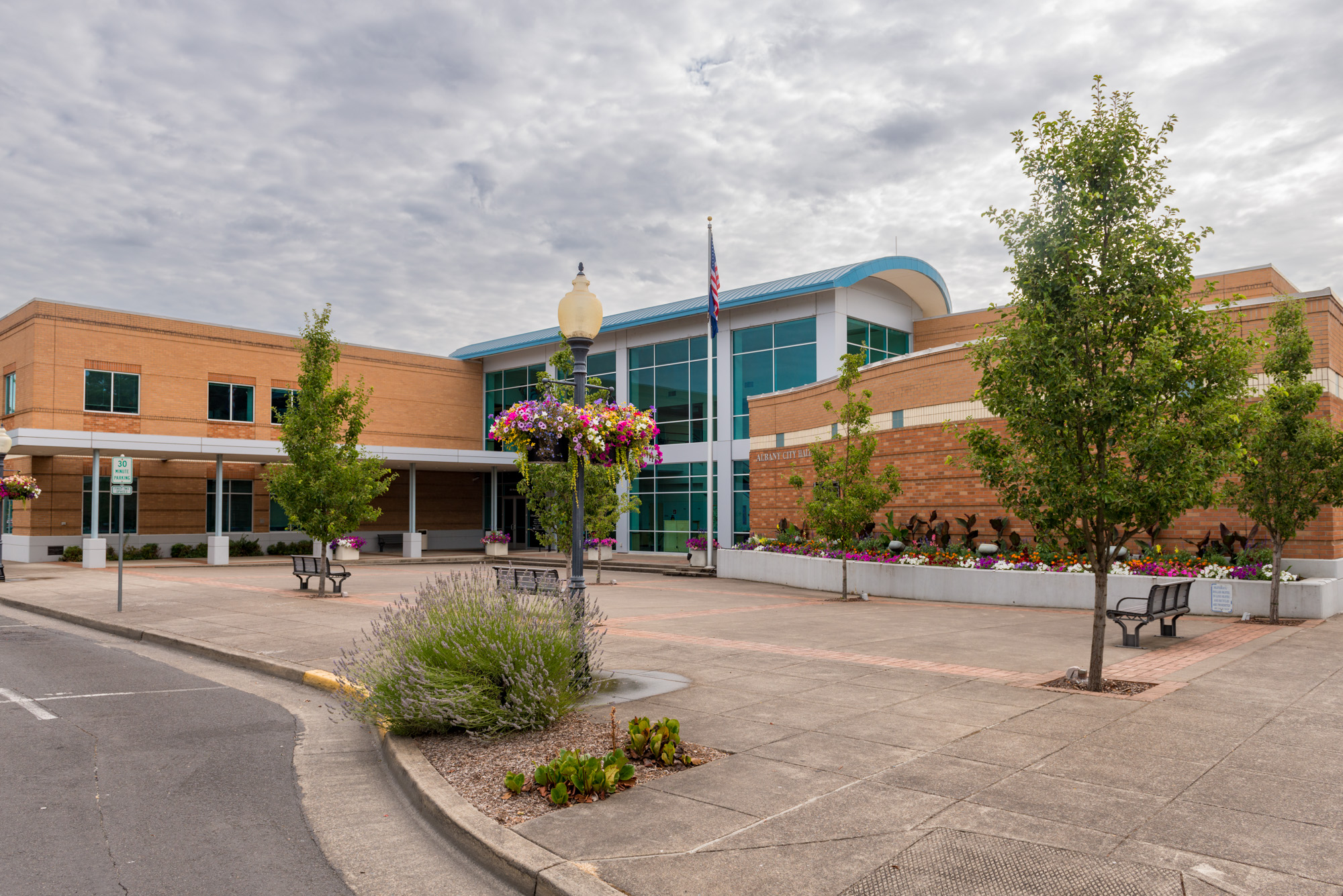
Albany City Hall

Albany has a home rule charter and a council–manager government. A full-time unelected city manager administers the day-to-day operations of the city for the council. The city manager since 2018 is Peter Troedsson. The mayor is elected at large every two years. The six council members represent the three geographic wards of the city and have overlapping four-year terms. The city charter was first adopted in 1891, and the most recent version of the city charter became effective on January 1, 1957, modified since then by ordinances adopted by the council. The mayor, as of 2025, is Alex Johnson II, and the council members are Steph Newton and Michael Thomson from Ward I, Carolyn McLeod and Chris Van Drimmelen from Ward II, and Ramycia McGhee and Marilyn Smith from Ward III.

Albany City Hall is located on Broadalbin Street in the downtown section of the city and was built in 1995. In 2018, City Hall houses:

- City Manager's office
- Finance Department
- Human Resources Department
- Information Technology Department
- Municipal Court
- Parks and Recreation administrative staff
- Public Works Engineering, Building and Planning divisions.

The city provides its own fire department, police department, library system, and also provides both their own water supply and wastewater treatment through the Public Works Operations division. The current wastewater treatment plant was completed in 2009. In total the local government employs around 450 full- and part-time employees with the majority in Police, Fire, and Public Works Operations.

The Albany city government was nationally recognized in 2009 and 2010 with the Certificate of Distinction and in 2011 and 2012 with the Certificate of Excellence from the International City/County Management Association (ICMA) for its dedication to improving governmental performance. In 2010, 2011 and 2012, the Sunshine Review awarded Albany an A+ perfect score for government transparency and online accessibility with its website along with other government agencies from around the country. Also in September 2010, the League of Oregon Cities awarded Albany the Good Governance Award for the "Where Does My Money Go? and Albany Dashboard" web applications and featured Albany for governmental transparency. In January 2011, Government Computer News cited Albany as one of ten "Top Public Sector Websites" in the nation for government transparency. Other recognition includes a 2016 award for Safest Cities in Oregon from BackgroundChecks.org and 2016 Top 25 Doers, Dreamers & Drivers for Assistant City Manager/CIO Jorge Salinas in Government Technology magazine.

Albany was a 2015 winner in the e.Republic Center for Digital Government (CDG) Digital Cities Survey. The annual survey recognizes leading examples of cities using technology to improve services and boost efficiencies.

Albany is also home to the county government and the Linn County Courthouse.

== Economy ==
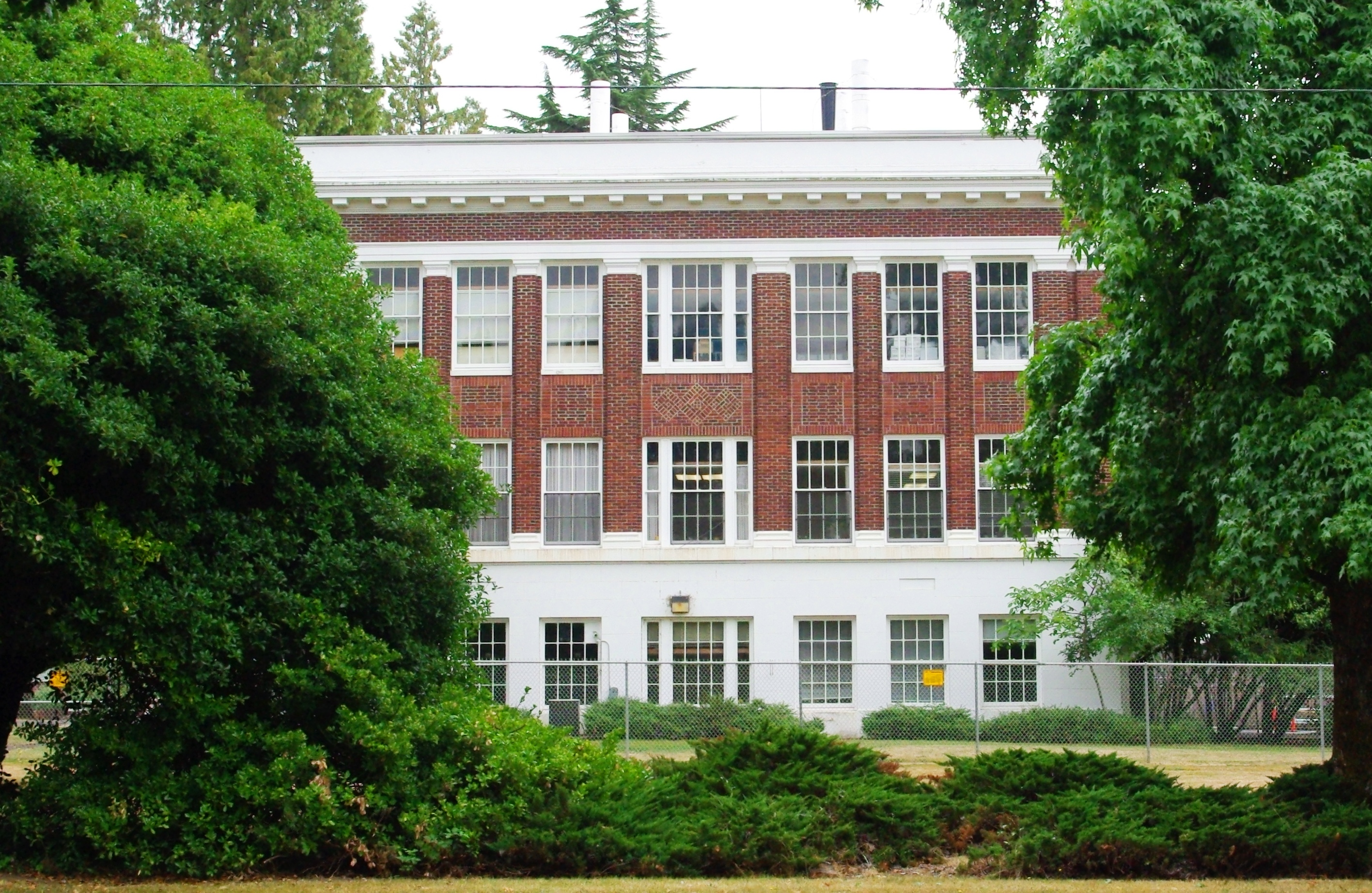
Albany Research Center

Albany calls itself the "rare metals capital of the world", producing zirconium, hafnium and titanium. One of the major producers of these metals in Albany is ATI Specialty Alloys and Components (formerly ATI Wah Chang) which has a 110-acre (0.45 km^{2}) site that primarily focuses on the production of zirconium.

Albany and the surrounding communities are major exporters of grass seed. Other crops produced include corn, beans, mint, strawberries, and hazelnuts. Linn County is also referred to as the "Grass Seed Capital of the World". Albany is the headquarters of Coastal Farm & Ranch, a chain of farm supply stores in the Pacific Northwest.

The decline of the timber industry and the outsourcing of manufacturing jobs has left Linn County with a relatively high unemployment rate. The Oregon Employment Department does not maintain unemployment statistics for cities. The losses in the timber industry in the region around Albany have led the city to a more diverse economic base for the city, led by retail trade, health care and social assistance, and manufacturing as the three leading aspects of the economy. Oregon Freeze Dry is a leading employer in the manufacturing sector of the Albany economy with its headquarters located in the city. The company employs over 300 people and was incorporated in 1963. The Albany facility is the company's main research and development site in the industry, and has recently partnered with Seattle-based technology company EnerG2 to produce carbon electrode material, in a 74,000-square-foot (6,900 m^{2}) former distribution center of Oregon Freeze Dry by 2011 bringing a new green technology industry to Albany. Tec Laboratories has made Tecnu poison ivy cleanser and other topical medicines in Albany since 1977.

Albany is also home to the Albany Research Center, which is part of National Energy Technology Laboratory (NETL). They employ a staff of 120. Albany Research Center was founded in 1943, the laboratory specializes in life cycle research starting with the formulation, characterization, and/or melting of most metals, alloys, and ceramics; casting and fabrication, prototype development; and the recycle and remediation of waste streams associated with these processes.

The Heritage Mall, an enclosed shopping center, opened on November 2, 1988. The construction of a regional shopping center had been planned for a decade and included proposals to build a rival mall in Corvallis.

== Arts and culture ==
=== Annual cultural events ===
The annual events in Albany include the Northwest Art and Air Festival, River Rhythms, Summer Sounds (formerly Mondays at Monteith), Veteran's Day Parade, Albany Upstairs Downtown Wine Walk and the Craft Brew Smackdown.

The once popular Albany Timber Carnival ended in 2000. An attempt to revive the event in 2008 was unsuccessful.

The Albany Arts Festival was held from 1970 until the late 1980s.

=== Museums and other points of interest ===
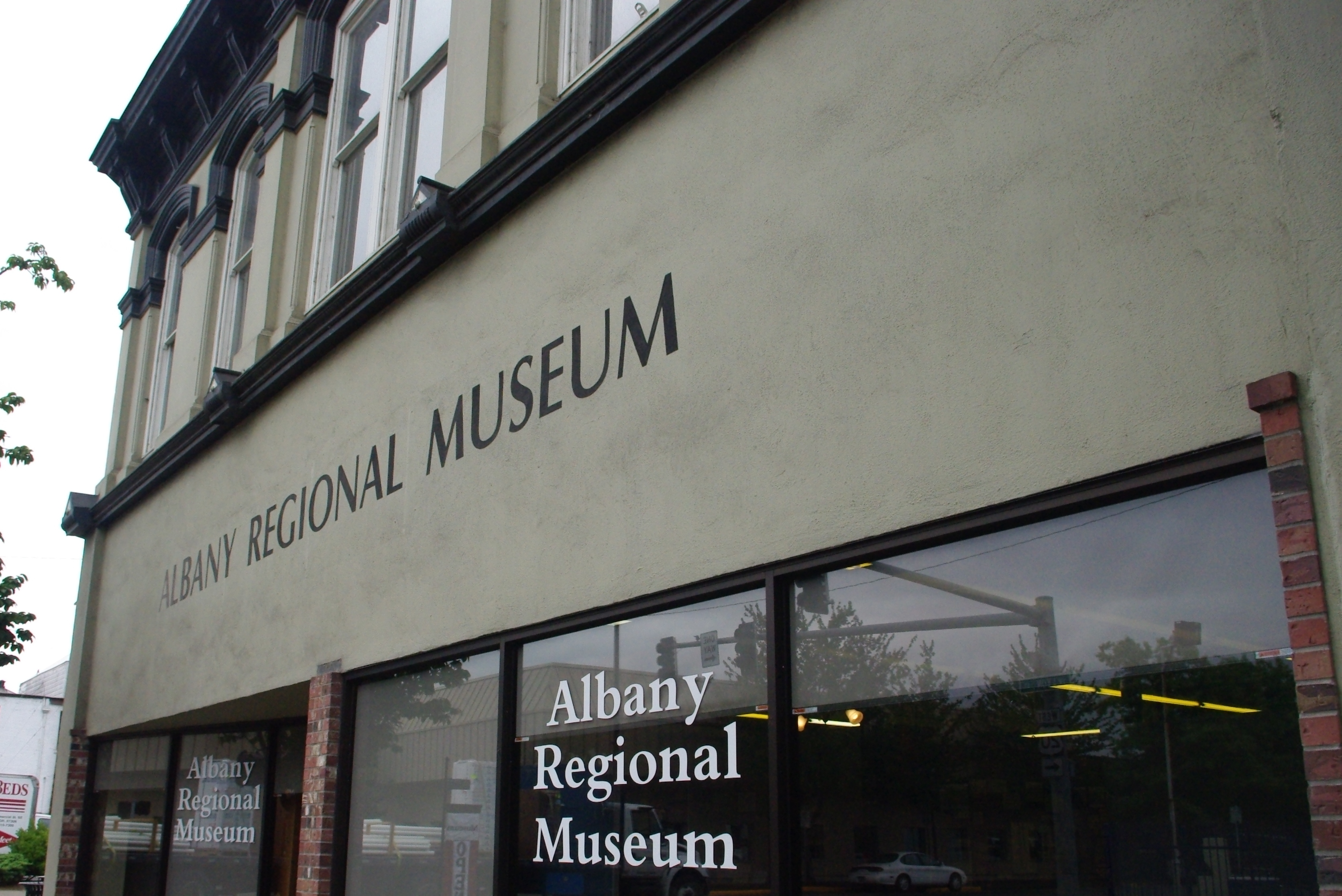
Albany Regional Museum

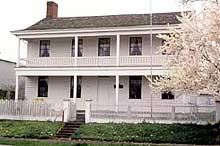
Thomas and Walter Monteith House

Areas of interest include the Thomas and Walter Monteith House. Originally constructed near the Calapooia River, the Monteith house is one of the oldest buildings in Albany. It has been relocated twice, most recently to downtown Albany, where is serves as the Monteith House Museum and is on the National Register of Historic Places. Whitespires Church, another historically registered building, is the tallest building in town. The Albany Regional Museum features exhibits about Albany history and is housed in a historic building originally built by S. E. Young in 1887. Downtown Albany is a National Historic District, and features antique stores, restaurants, the Albany Civic Theater (one of the oldest civic theaters in Oregon, it has operated continuously since the opening of its first production on March 2, 1951), and one of the oldest Carnegie libraries still being used as a library. Since the early 2000s, a hand-carved carousel has been under construction at the Albany Historic Carousel and Museum.

Albany has four historic districts including the Albany Municipal Airport, Monteith Historic District, Hackleman Historic District, and the Albany Downtown Commercial Historic District. Albany's historic districts include most of the housing styles built between 1840 and 1920, including Federal, Gothic Revival, American Farmhouse, Second Empire, Eastlake, Italianate, and Colonial Revival. Those historic districts were recognized as one of the best places to buy a historic home in the nation by This Old House online. In total there are over 700 historic buildings within the 4 historic districts.

== Parks and recreation ==
The Albany Parks and Recreation Department is the agency responsible for the Senior Center, the Periwinkle Creek Bike Path, and the other trails and parks within Albany. The department's recreation staff spends most of the summer organizing and running the city-organized events that occur at these parks such as River Rhythms, Summer Sounds, and the Northwest Art & Air Festival. The department is in charge of running and maintaining the Albany Community Pool and the Swanson Park Action Center which houses the Albany Cool! Pool. Albany's Parks and Recreation Department aims to make it where everyone within the city limits lives within 2 miles (3.2 km) of a park.

Albany's Timber-Linn Memorial Park house the 63rd Blue Star veterans memorial in the state of Oregon. The memorial is dedicated to Linn County servicemen who lost their lives during all of the 20th century wars. The memorial lists the names of those from Linn County killed in action for each war fought throughout the 20th century. The memorial was sponsored by the Santiam District Garden Club and the Linn County Veterans Memorial Association. Albany's Timber-Linn Memorial Park also hosted the American Veterans Traveling Tribute, a replica of the Vietnam Memorial wall in Washington, D.C., in July 2009.

The department also has an urban forestry program which involves the Legacy Forest at Lexington Park, that consists of commemorative tree planting designed to perpetuate the memory or work of individuals and organizations. A Heritage Tree Program was established to recognize trees having historic significance in the community. The city has also been involved with the Tree City USA program that is sponsored by The National Arbor Day Foundation since 1993. The city also takes part annually in Arbor Week.

Albany has two golf courses, both in North Albany. The Golf Club of Oregon is public, and Spring Hill Golf Club at Albany Golf & Event Center, a former country club, is essentially public. Albany also has one bowling alley, Lake Shore Lanes, which also has a miniature golf course outside the bowling alley.

== Education ==
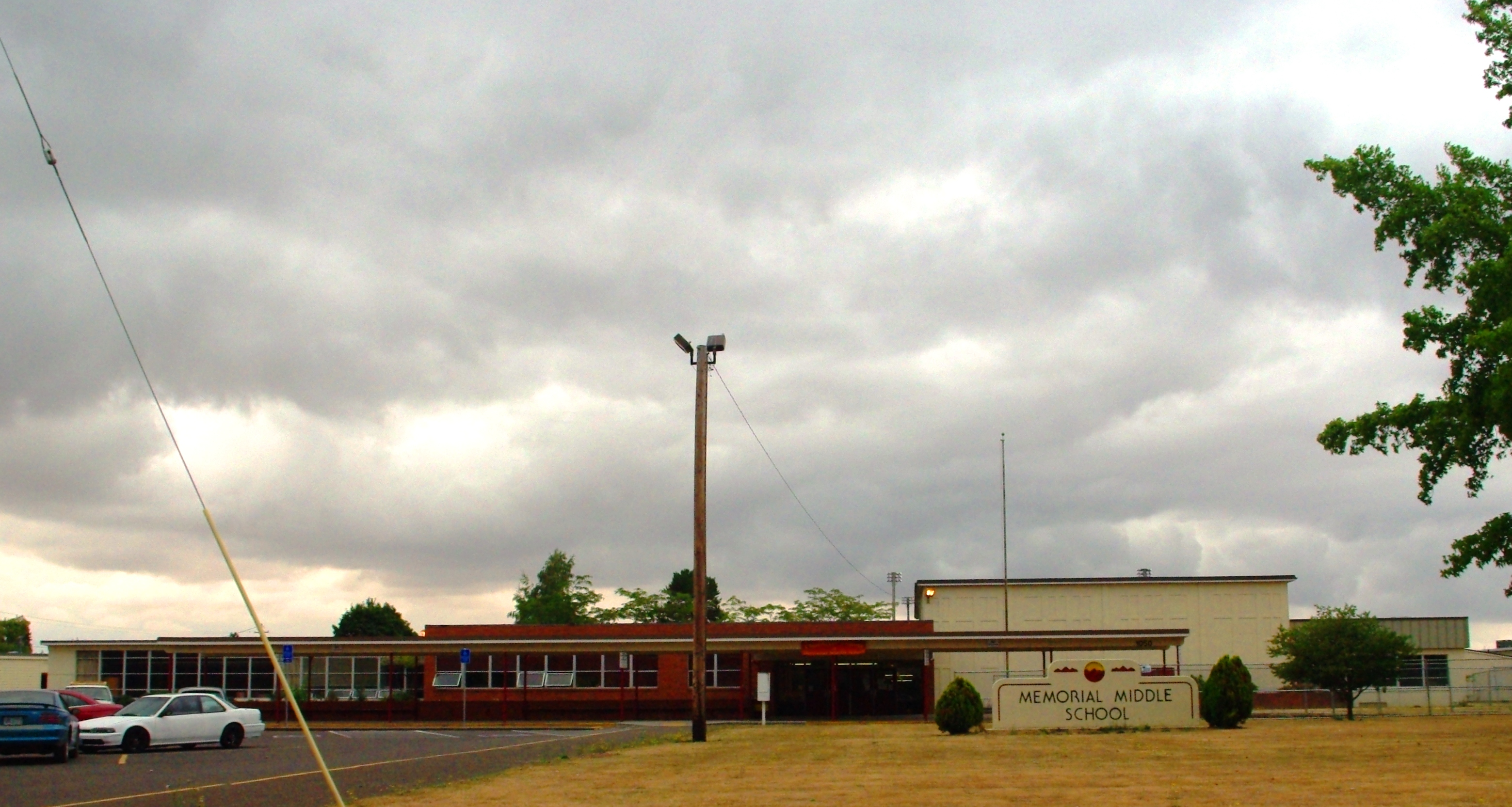
Memorial Middle School

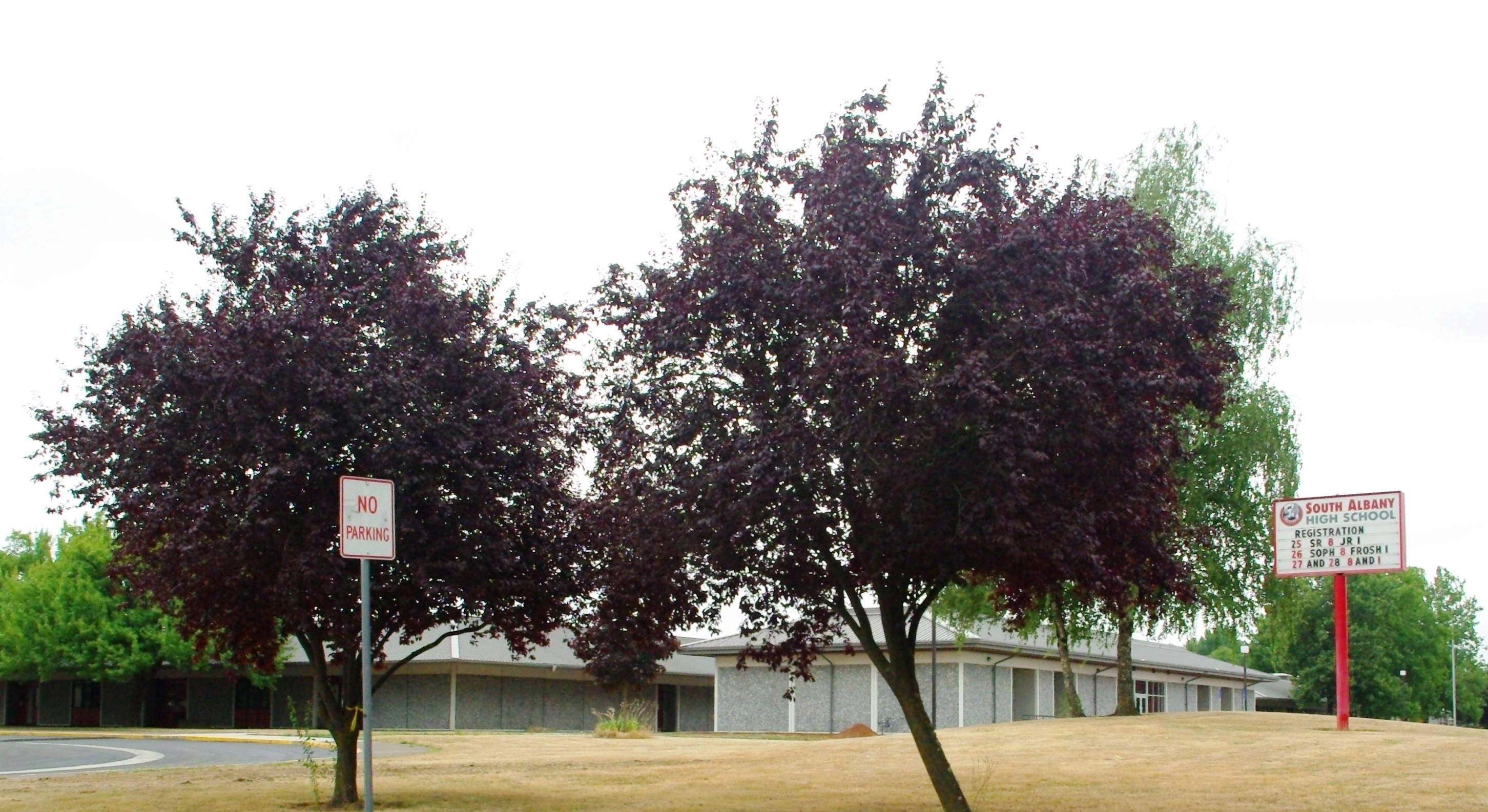
South Albany High School

Albany is the home of the main campus of a two-year junior college called Linn-Benton Community College, which was established in 1966. The college offers certificates and associate degrees and has many transfer and dual enrollment programs with OSU. LBCC offers 47 areas of study and programs, serves over 18,000 full- and part-time students and is supported financially through tuition, property taxes and the State of Oregon.

The Albany area has also been served since 1979 by the Greater Albany Public School District, including West Albany High School, and South Albany High School, which have a combined enrollment of approximately 2,700 students. Albany is also served by Albany Options School as an alternative to traditional school for grades 6 through 12. In total Greater Albany Public School District serves roughly 8,900 students throughout its 23 different schools. Along with the K-12 schools Albany also offers student services at the Maple Lawn Preschool.

Name	Current campus	Enrollment (2009–10)	Nickname
South Albany High School	1970	1,270	RedHawks
West Albany High School	1953	1,450	Bulldogs
Albany Options School	2001	155	Knights

The Albany Collegiate Institute was founded in 1867 and served as Albany's higher education institute for 70 years before it was moved to Portland, Oregon, and renamed Lewis & Clark College.

== Media ==
=== Newspaper ===
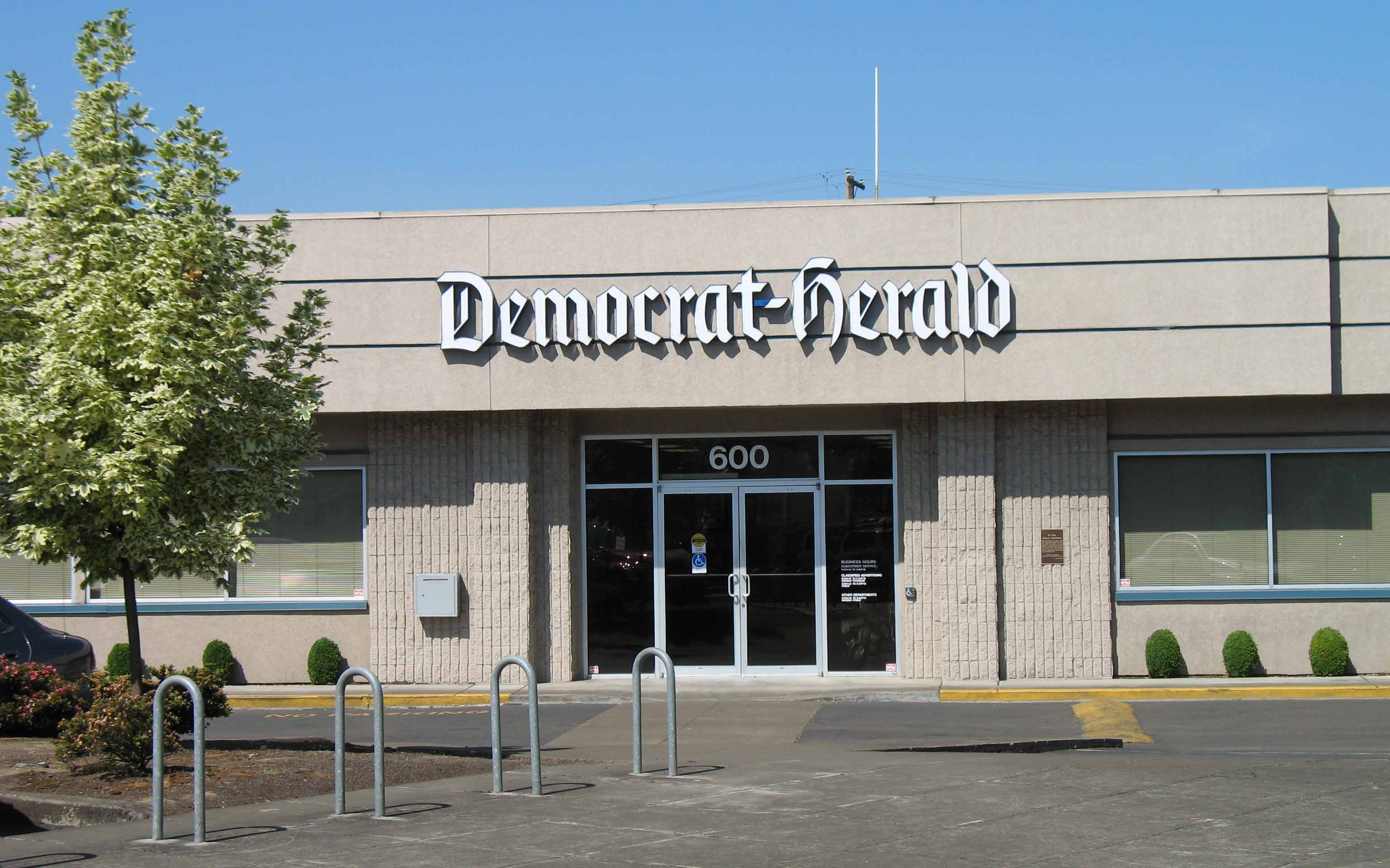
Democrat-Herald offices on Lyon Street

The primary media outlet is the daily newspaper Albany Democrat-Herald which is owned and published by Lee Enterprises. The Democrat-Herald started as a political tool for one of Oregon's first senators. The Democrat-Herald traces its origin to the Albany Democrat newspaper, founded by Delazon Smith in 1859. Lee Enterprises also publishes the Mid-Valley Times, the Sunday version of the paper.

=== Radio ===
Albany has eight different radio stations that are either broadcast or have offices within Albany and many others that serve the area. the FM stations are, 107.9FM KHPE that uses the tagline (HOPE-FM) which is a Christian contemporary music radio station, and 99.9FM KRKT-FM, a country radio station that both broadcast from Albany. There is also 101.5FM KFLY, which is based out of Eugene, Oregon, but maintains an office in the Albany area.

Along with the FM stations there are five AM stations. 790 AM KWIL, is the AM version of KHPE (107.9FM). The others range from adult standard such as KSHO (920 AM), comedy radio and Seattle Mariners baseball games KTHH (990 AM), to sports KEJO (1240 AM), and KGAL (1580 AM) the local news and talk radio station.

== Infrastructure ==
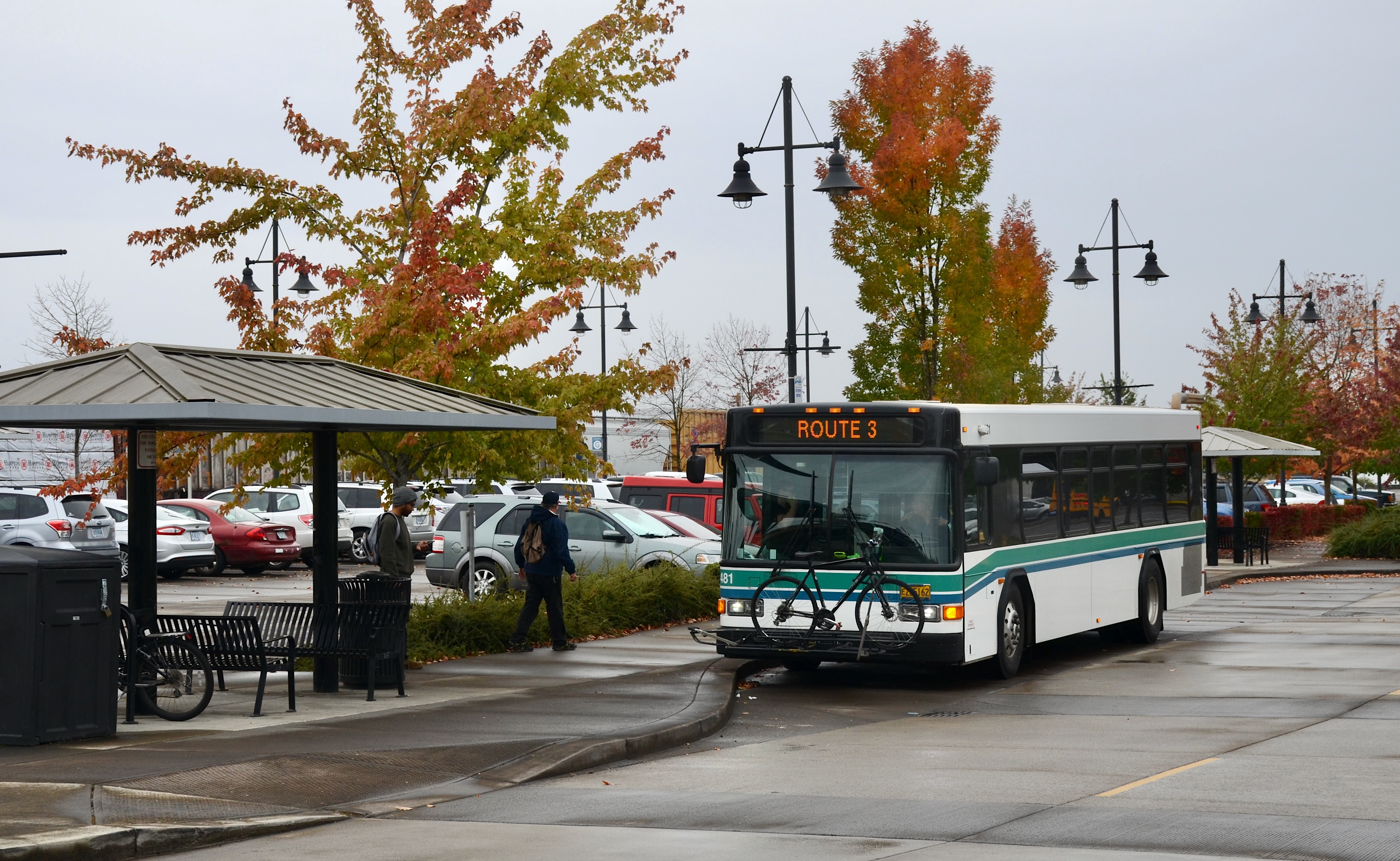
Albany Transit System bus at the Amtrak station in 2018

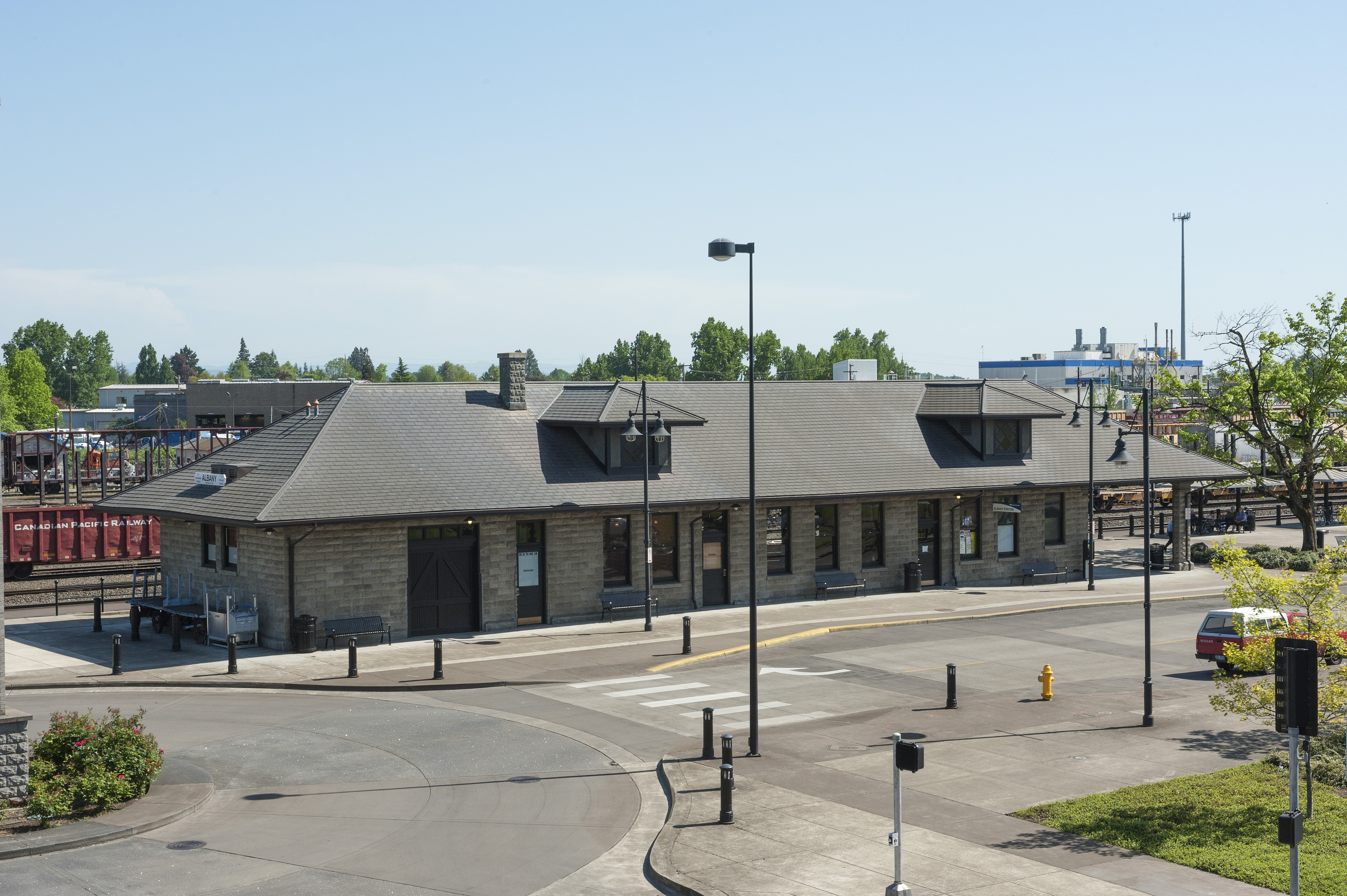
Amtrak station

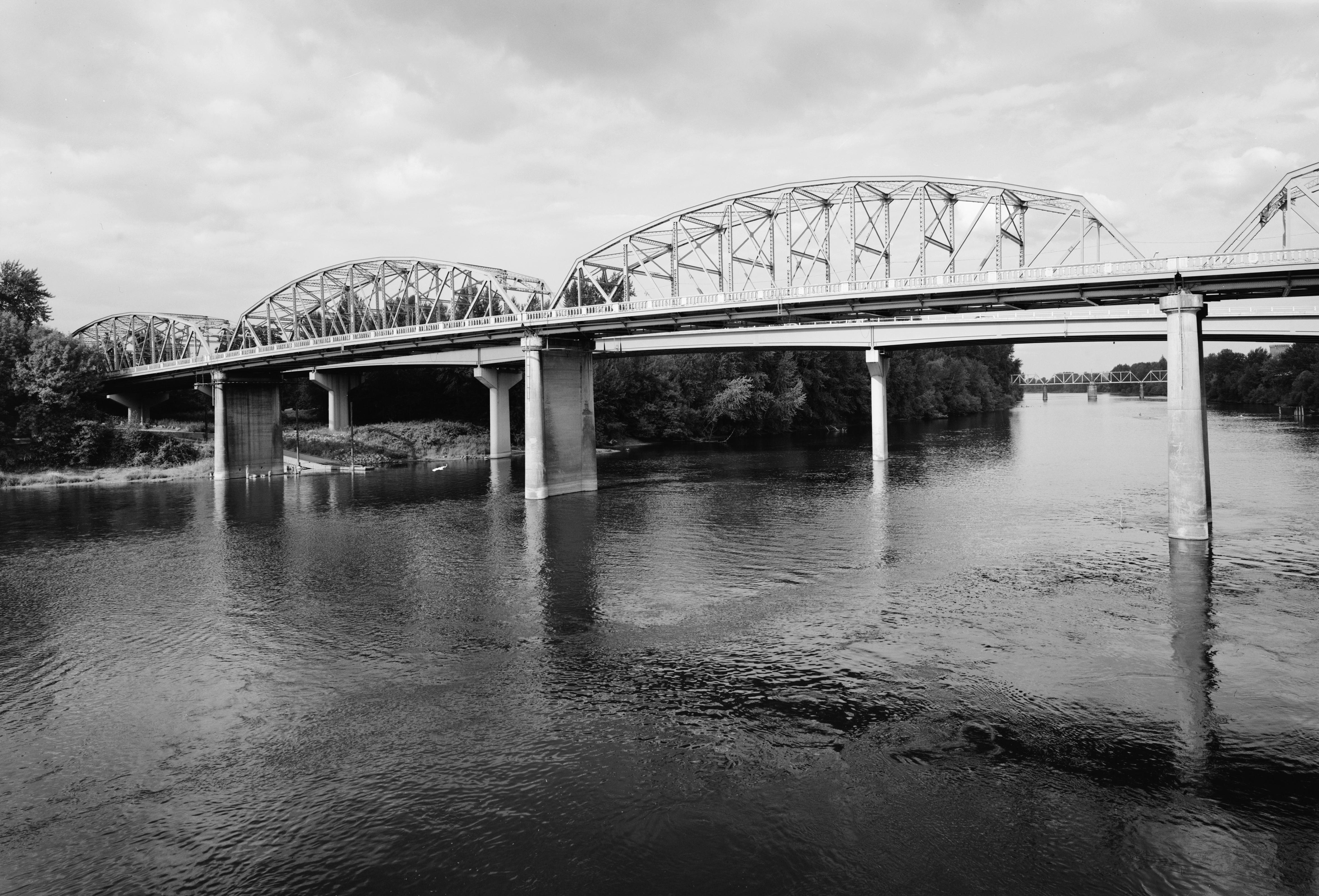
Ellsworth Street Bridge

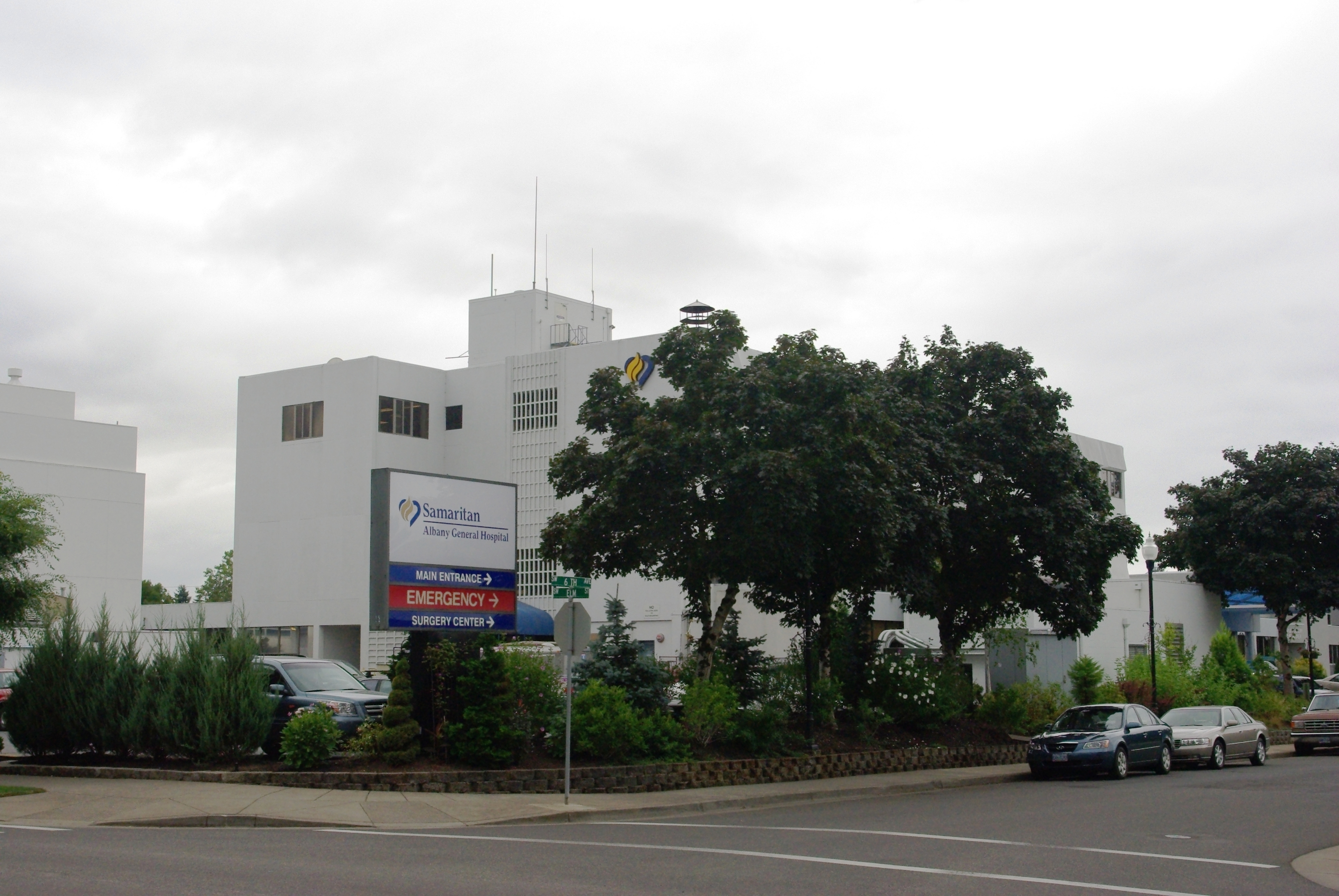
Samaritan Albany General Hospital

=== Transportation ===
==== Highway ====
Interstate 5 and Oregon Route 99E run through Albany in a north and south direction and U.S. Route 20 runs through it in an east and west direction. Just outside the south end of Albany Oregon Route 34 runs from east to west.

==== Air ====
Albany Municipal Airport is a general aviation airport on the eastern edge of Albany and has been open since 1920 and is believed to be the oldest operating airfield in Oregon. In 1998, the airport became the first airport in Oregon to be named to the National Register of Historic Places, and was the City of Albany's fourth National Historic District, It held its first air show in 1931 and has been home to exhibits, helicopter rides and Young Eagles flights for children as part of the annual Northwest Art & Air Festival. It has a single runway with the specs of 16–34 3,004 X 75, and is an asphalt runway. The closest airports with commercial air service available are the Eugene Airport to the south and the Portland International Airport to the north.

==== Bus ====
Public transportation within Albany is provided by Albany Transit System (ATS). Connections to Corvallis are provided by bus service via the Linn-Benton Loop and the Valley Retriever Thruway inter-county bus systems. ATS, the Linn-Benton Loop, and the Valley Retriever all provide bus service to and from the Amtrak station.

==== Train ====
Amtrak, the national passenger rail system, provides service to Albany from its Albany Station at 10th Avenue SW on two routes. Long-haul train route the Coast Starlight (with service from Los Angeles to Seattle) stops in Albany daily in both directions. Amtrak Cascades commuter trains operate between Vancouver, British Columbia and Eugene, Oregon, and serve Albany several times daily in each direction. The Amtrak Cascades line is the proposed path of the Pacific Northwest Corridor high-speed rail line. The Albany station would be one of many stops along the proposed 466-mile (750 km), 110-mile-per-hour (180 km/h) passenger line.

The station itself was constructed in 1909 for the Southern Pacific Railroad and is built of masonry. It is one of the oldest continuously operating passenger rail stations in the U.S. and has one of the best-equipped engine shops in the northwest. Southern Pacific 4449, a steam locomotive which resides at the Oregon Rail Heritage Center in Portland, occasionally visited the shop for repairs when it was residing at the Brooklyn Roundhouse in Portland (before 2012), as did several other locomotives stored at the now-demolished roundhouse. Beginning in 2004, the station and the surrounding area underwent an $11.3 million restoration that was funded with a combination of federal, state, local, and Amtrak money. In 2006 the city received the Award in Downtown Excellence from the Oregon Downtown Development Association for the renovation of the station.

==== Bridges ====
Albany has both the Ellsworth Street Bridge which was constructed in 1926 and the Lyon Street Bridge that was constructed in 1973. They are both two-lane bridges that make up part of U.S. Route 20. The two bridges connect Linn to the south with Benton county in the north as they pass across the Willamette River. this makes up the major connection of downtown Albany with the north end of town and to Corvallis.

==== Paths and trails ====
Albany has many paths and trails open to both pedestrian and bicyclists. Simpson Park Trail is a dirt pedestrian trail with a round trip distance of 2.36 miles (3.80 km). The dirt trail starts at the parking lot of Simpson Park and continuing until the path ends in a grassy area with one very narrow path heading back toward the river. Periwinkle Creek Trail though is the longest of all the paved trails. It is a flat bicycle and pedestrian path that runs along Periwinkle Creek from the northwest corner of Grand Prairie Park to the Albany Boys and Girls Club, and travels a round trip distance of 3.61 miles (5.81 km). There are many other trails throughout the city to include, Cox Creek Loop and Waverly Lake Loop, Dave Clark Trail, Oak Creek Greenbelt Trail, Takena Landing Trail, Timber Linn Park Trails, and a proposed Swanson Park Connector a paved path on the north side of highway 99 that connects Swanson Park with the nearby Amtrak/Transit Center.

Albany has made a growing effort to increase itself as a bicyclist friendly town through increasing the number of paths and trails that are open to them. The city was recently recognised as a Bicycle-Friendly Community for 2010 by the League of American Bicyclists for its efforts.

=== Health care ===
Albany is served by Samaritan Albany General Hospital, a 76-bed medical facility that is the main hospital for the city and has been in operation since 1924. Albany is also served by Samaritan North Albany Urgent Care and Geary Street Urgent Care, both of which are part of Samaritan Health Services. The unaffiliated Albany Family & Specialty Medicine also provides medical services to the community.

== Notable people ==
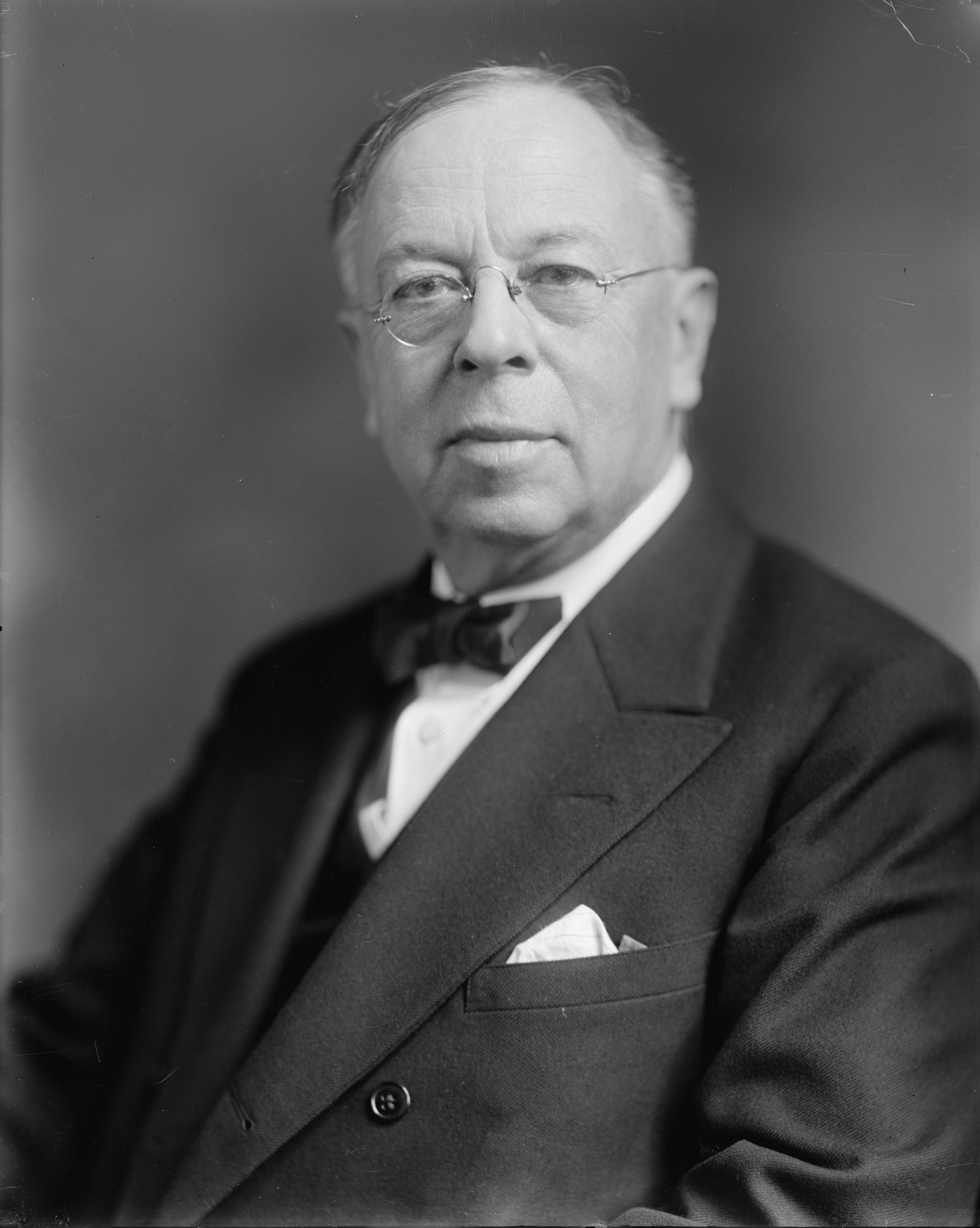
George Chamberlain, the 11th Governor of Oregon

- Jerry Andrus (1918–2007) – magician
- Mike Barrett (born 1968) – TV announcer of the NBA
- Charles B. Bellinger (1839–1905) – federal district court judge, editor of the State Rights Democrat (now the Albany Democrat-Herald)
- Charles Burggraf Architect that spent most of his professional career in Albany.
- Dyrol Burleson 1500 m Olympian
- George Earle Chamberlain (1854–1928) – 11th Governor of Oregon
- Daveigh Chase (1990-2026) – actress
- Abigail Scott Duniway (1834–1915) – writer, newspaper publisher, and women's rights advocate
- Neil Elshire – former NFL defensive end, Minnesota Vikings
- Members of Falling Up – Christian rock band
- Alan L. Hart (1890–1962) – physician and novelist, raised in Albany
- Glenn L. Jackson (1902-1980) - Businessman and Chairman of the Oregon State Highway Commission
- Dave Johnson (born 1963) – Olympic athlete and former West Albany High School teacher
- Percy R. Kelly (1870–1949) – American attorney and jurist in the state of Oregon
- Ardyth Kennelly (1912–2005) – novelist
- Frank Morse (born 1943) – politician
- Sam Shoen (1916–1999) – founder of U-Haul Corp., operated a barbershop in the St. Francis Hotel at First Ave. and Ferry St. while a student at Oregon State College in the early 1940s.
- Delazon Smith (1816–1860) – politician
- Elmo Smith (1909–1968) – 27th Governor of Oregon
- Evelyn Waldren (1908–1986) – aviation pioneer
- James K. Weatherford (1850–1935) – Speaker of the Oregon House of Representatives (1876) and State Senator
- Mae Yih (born 1928) – member of the Oregon Legislative Assembly

== See also ==
- West Albany
