= Crawfordsville, Oregon =

Unincorporated community in Oregon, U.S.

- Census-designated place
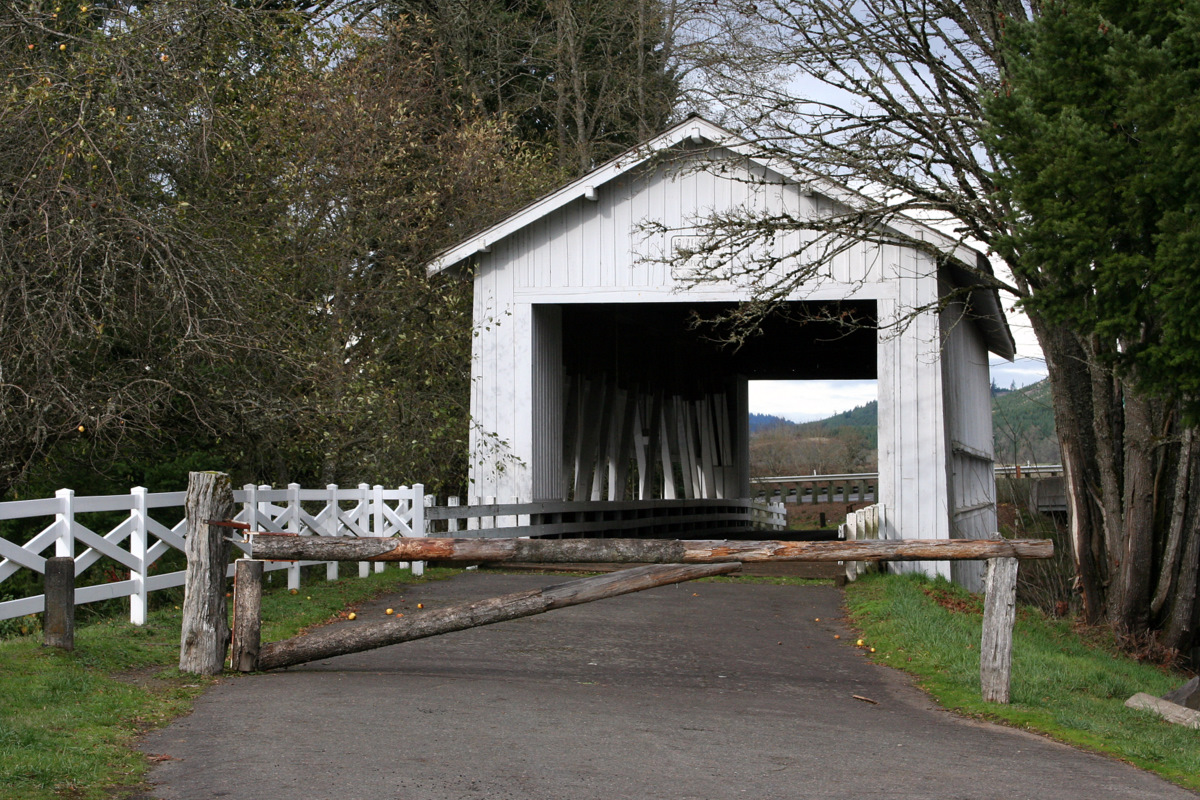
- The Crawfordsville Bridge

- Location within Oregon Location within the United States
- Coordinates: 44°21′25″N 122°52′28″W
- Country: United States
- State: Oregon
- County: Linn
- Founded: 1870

Area
  - Total: 1.92 sq mi (4.98 km^{2})
  - Land: 1.92 sq mi (4.98 km^{2})
  - Water: 0 sq mi (0.00 km^{2})
- Elevation: 446 ft (136 m)

Population (2020)
  - Total: 315
  - Density: 163.9/sq mi (63.28/km^{2})
- Time zone: UTC-8 (Pacific (PST))
  - Summer (DST): UTC-7 (PDT)
- ZIP code: 97336
- FIPS code: 41-16650
- GNIS feature ID: 2584413

Crawfordsville is a census-designated place and unincorporated community in Linn County, Oregon, United States. As of the 2020 census, Crawfordsville had a population of 315. It is located about 7 miles (11 km) southeast of Brownsville and 8 miles (13 km) southwest of Sweet Home on Oregon Route 228, near the Calapooia River. It has a post office with a ZIP code of 97336.

== History ==
Crawfordsville was founded on the land of Philemon Vawter Crawford in 1870 by Crawford and Robert Glass. When the post office was established in 1870, it was named for Crawford. Crawford was born in Madison, Indiana, in 1814 and he arrived in Oregon via the Oregon Trail in 1851. His son, Jasper V. Crawford, was the first postmaster. Philemon Crawford had previously helped establish the Boston Flour Mill near Shedd.

In 1915 Crawfordsville had a population of 300, two sawmills, a flouring mill, a high school, an elementary school, and three churches.

In the early 20th century, Crawfordsville had a population of Sikhs from Pakistan and India who worked for the Calapooya Lumber Company.

== Demographics ==
Historical population
Census	Pop.	Note	%±
2020	315		—
U.S. Decennial Census

== Education ==
Crawfordsville Elementary School, part of the Sweet Home School District, closed in 2011, 158 years after its founding in 1853. Area elementary students now attend Holley Elementary School in Holley.

== Points of interest ==
The Crawfordsville Bridge over the Calapooia River is listed on the National Register of Historic Places.

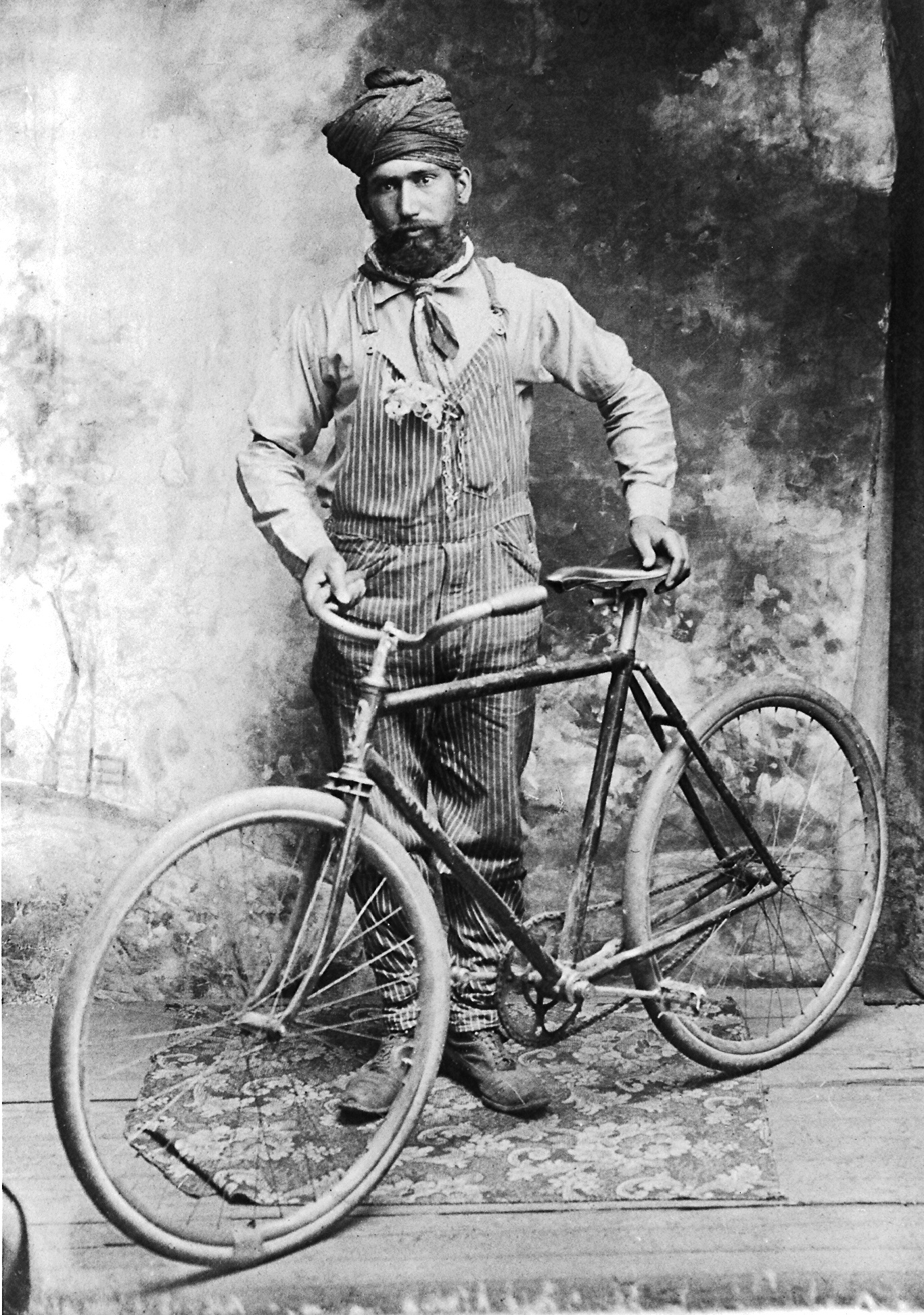
Photograph of a Sikh cyclist "Heara Singh", Crawfordsville, Oregon (c. 1900s)
