= Sweet Home, Oregon =

City in Oregon, United States

- City
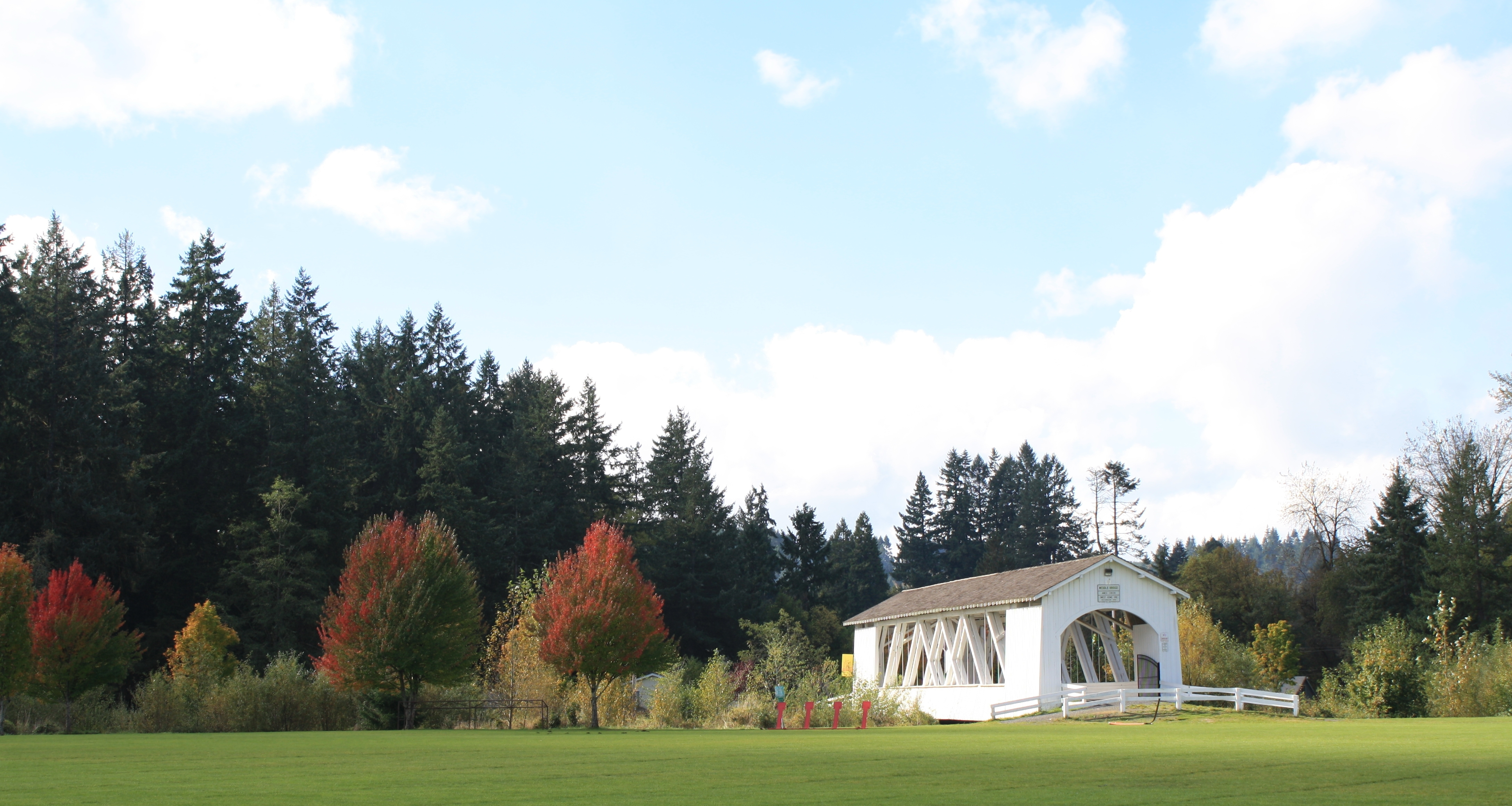
- The Weddle Bridge spans Ames Creek in Sweet Home, Oregon.
- Mottoes: Sweet Home: Oregon at its Best; Gateway to the Santiam Playground
- Location in Oregon
- Coordinates: 44°24′05″N 122°43′12″W
- Country: United States
- State: Oregon
- County: Linn
- Incorporated: 1893

Government
  - Type: Council-Manager
  - Mayor: Susan Coleman (R)

Area
  - Total: 5.76 sq mi (14.91 km^{2})
  - Land: 5.30 sq mi (13.73 km^{2})
  - Water: 0.46 sq mi (1.18 km^{2})
- Elevation: 604 ft (184 m)

Population (2020)
  - Total: 9,828
  - Estimate (2023): 10,156
  - Density: 1,853.5/sq mi (715.65/km^{2})
- Time zone: UTC-8 (Pacific)
  - Summer (DST): UTC-7 (Pacific)
- ZIP code: 97386
- Area codes: 458 and 541
- FIPS code: 41-71950
- GNIS feature ID: 2412022
- Website: www.sweethomeor.gov

Sweet Home is a city in Linn County, Oregon, United States, with a population of 9,828 at the 2020 census. Sweet Home is referred to as the 'Gateway to the Santiam Playground' due to its proximity to nearby lakes, rivers and the Cascade Mountains.

== History ==
Settlers first arrived in the Sweet Home Valley in the early 1850s. A community known as Buckhead developed near the mouth of Ames Creek and the South Santiam River. Buckhead was named after a saloon that featured a set of elk antlers on the gable end of its building. East of Buckhead, a community called Mossville developed with a store and post office. In 1874, the two communities merged to become one community called Sweet Home. In 1893, the city of Sweet Home was incorporated.

The Santiam Wagon Road, a toll road connecting the Willamette Valley with central Oregon, was opened in 1865. The road extended from the Sweet Home Valley across the Santiam Pass in the Cascades to Camp Polk near Sisters. The Santiam Wagon Road was a vital means of supplying livestock and goods from western Oregon to central Oregon and transporting wool from east of the Cascades back to Willamette Valley woolen mills. Competition with railroads that extended south from the Columbia River into central Oregon and the newly opened McKenzie Pass Highway made the wagon road obsolete by the late 1930s. U.S. Route 20 was constructed across much of the same route as the Santiam Wagon Road.

Sweet Home experienced significant growth during the 1940s due to the demand for timber from local forests. Further growth occurred when construction began on nearby Green Peter Dam in 1962 and continued as construction began on Foster Dam in 1966.

During the 1980s, Sweet Home experienced a number of sawmill and plywood mill closures due to economic cycles, increased competition, increased productivity, and logging restrictions placed on nearby forests resulting from environmental concerns for endangered species. In response, community members sought out other economic development opportunities such as the Oregon Jamboree country music and camping festival.

== Geography ==
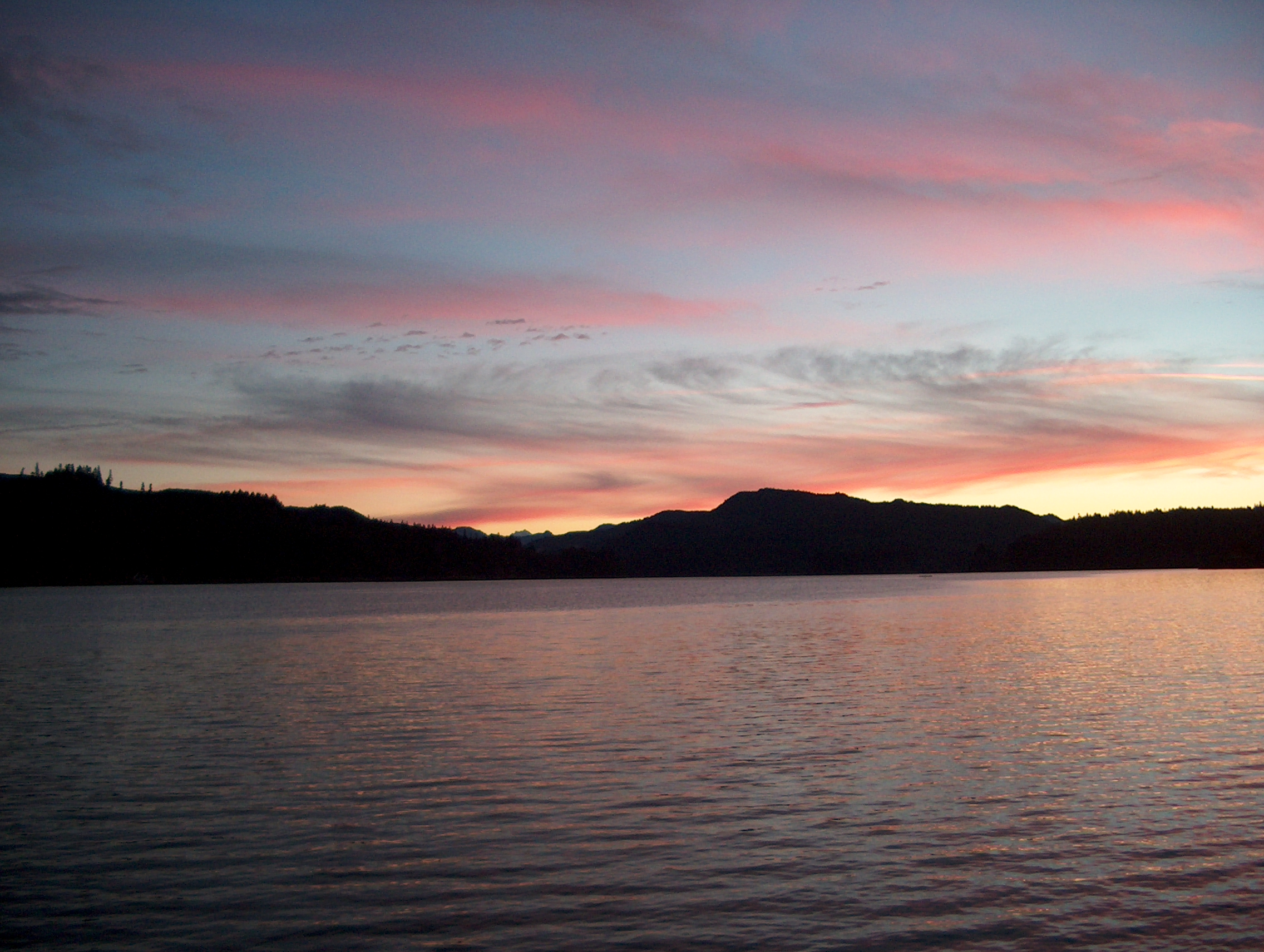
Foster Lake is on the eastern edge of Sweet Home.

According to the United States Census Bureau, the city has a total area of 5.75 square miles (14.89 km^{2}), of which 5.30 square miles (13.73 km^{2}) is land and 0.45 square miles (1.17 km^{2}) is water.

The intersection Oregon Route 228 and U.S. Route 20 occurs at the Western end of Sweet Home.

The South Santiam River flows from Foster Reservoir along the northern city limits of Sweet Home. Ames Creek and Wiley Creek flow into the South Santiam River within the city limits.

Sweet Home is built on a prehistoric petrified forest. In addition to fossil wood, the area includes a variety of agate, jasper, and other crystals and minerals. The abundant petrified wood at Holleywood Ranch (between Sweet Home and Holley, Oregon) was the subject of an episode of the Travel Channel program Cash and Treasures.

=== Climate ===
The region experiences warm (but not hot) and dry summers, with no average monthly temperatures above 71.6 °F (22.0 °C). According to the Köppen Climate Classification system, Sweet Home has a warm-summer Mediterranean climate, abbreviated "Csb" on climate maps.

Climate data for Foster Dam, Oregon (1991–2020 normals, extremes 1969–present)
| Month | Jan | Feb | Mar | Apr | May | Jun | Jul | Aug | Sep | Oct | Nov | Dec | Year |
|---|---|---|---|---|---|---|---|---|---|---|---|---|---|
| Record high °F (°C) | 67 (19) | 71 (22) | 79 (26) | 86 (30) | 96 (36) | 112 (44) | 106 (41) | 105 (41) | 102 (39) | 93 (34) | 73 (23) | 69 (21) | 112 (44) |
| Mean maximum °F (°C) | 60.1 (15.6) | 63.6 (17.6) | 71.2 (21.8) | 77.6 (25.3) | 85.1 (29.5) | 89.8 (32.1) | 96.1 (35.6) | 97.1 (36.2) | 91.8 (33.2) | 79.7 (26.5) | 65.9 (18.8) | 59.2 (15.1) | 99.5 (37.5) |
| Mean daily maximum °F (°C) | 47.5 (8.6) | 51.2 (10.7) | 55.5 (13.1) | 60.3 (15.7) | 67.0 (19.4) | 72.9 (22.7) | 81.7 (27.6) | 82.6 (28.1) | 76.4 (24.7) | 64.1 (17.8) | 52.9 (11.6) | 46.5 (8.1) | 63.2 (17.3) |
| Daily mean °F (°C) | 40.9 (4.9) | 42.8 (6.0) | 46.2 (7.9) | 49.9 (9.9) | 55.5 (13.1) | 60.4 (15.8) | 66.4 (19.1) | 66.4 (19.1) | 61.6 (16.4) | 53.0 (11.7) | 45.3 (7.4) | 40.4 (4.7) | 52.4 (11.3) |
| Mean daily minimum °F (°C) | 34.3 (1.3) | 34.5 (1.4) | 36.9 (2.7) | 39.6 (4.2) | 43.9 (6.6) | 47.9 (8.8) | 51.0 (10.6) | 50.3 (10.2) | 46.8 (8.2) | 41.9 (5.5) | 37.6 (3.1) | 34.3 (1.3) | 41.6 (5.3) |
| Mean minimum °F (°C) | 22.7 (−5.2) | 24.4 (−4.2) | 27.2 (−2.7) | 31.1 (−0.5) | 34.6 (1.4) | 40.3 (4.6) | 43.8 (6.6) | 42.2 (5.7) | 38.0 (3.3) | 31.1 (−0.5) | 26.1 (−3.3) | 22.0 (−5.6) | 18.1 (−7.7) |
| Record low °F (°C) | 0 (−18) | 2 (−17) | 19 (−7) | 22 (−6) | 26 (−3) | 35 (2) | 39 (4) | 36 (2) | 31 (−1) | 20 (−7) | 16 (−9) | 0 (−18) | 0 (−18) |
| Average precipitation inches (mm) | 7.15 (182) | 5.56 (141) | 6.26 (159) | 5.37 (136) | 3.80 (97) | 2.46 (62) | 0.54 (14) | 0.64 (16) | 1.99 (51) | 4.64 (118) | 7.64 (194) | 8.40 (213) | 54.45 (1,383) |
| Average snowfall inches (cm) | 0.1 (0.25) | 0.0 (0.0) | 0.0 (0.0) | 0.0 (0.0) | 0.0 (0.0) | 0.0 (0.0) | 0.0 (0.0) | 0.0 (0.0) | 0.0 (0.0) | 0.0 (0.0) | 0.0 (0.0) | 0.0 (0.0) | 0.1 (0.25) |
| Average precipitation days (≥ 0.01 in) | 19.1 | 16.8 | 18.6 | 17.9 | 12.8 | 9.2 | 2.8 | 3.0 | 6.8 | 13.1 | 18.4 | 20.0 | 158.5 |
| Average snowy days (≥ 0.1 in) | 0.0 | 0.0 | 0.0 | 0.0 | 0.0 | 0.0 | 0.0 | 0.0 | 0.0 | 0.0 | 0.0 | 0.0 | 0.0 |
Source: NOAA

== Demographics ==
Historical population
| Census | Pop. | Note | %± |
|---|---|---|---|
| 1910 | 202 | | — |
| 1920 | 175 | | −13.4% |
| 1930 | 189 | | 8.0% |
| 1940 | 1,090 | | 476.7% |
| 1950 | 3,603 | | 230.6% |
| 1960 | 3,353 | | −6.9% |
| 1970 | 3,799 | | 13.3% |
| 1980 | 6,921 | | 82.2% |
| 1990 | 6,850 | | −1.0% |
| 2000 | 8,016 | | 17.0% |
| 2010 | 8,925 | | 11.3% |
| 2020 | 9,828 | | 10.1% |
U.S. Decennial Census

The median income for a household in the city was $43,589; 20.7% of persons were below the poverty line.

=== 2020 census ===
As of the 2020 census, Sweet Home had a population of 9,828. The median age was 41.3 years, 22.9% of residents were under the age of 18, 20.7% of residents were 65 years of age or older, and there were 99.6 males for every 100 females and 96.9 males for every 100 females age 18 and over.

The population density was 1,684.0 inhabitants per square mile (650.2/km^{2}). There were 4,037 housing units at an average density of 710.9 units per square mile (274.5 units/km^{2}), of which 5.7% were vacant; among occupied units, 67.1% were owner-occupied and 32.9% were renter-occupied, with a homeowner vacancy rate of 2.3% and a rental vacancy rate of 3.9%.

There were 3,807 households in Sweet Home, of which 29.7% had children under the age of 18 living in them. Of all households, 44.0% were married-couple households, 20.2% were households with a male householder and no spouse or partner present, and 25.8% were households with a female householder and no spouse or partner present. About 26.2% of all households were made up of individuals and 13.8% had someone living alone who was 65 years of age or older.

98.7% of residents lived in urban areas, while 1.3% lived in rural areas.

Racial composition as of the 2020 census
| Race | Number | Percent |
|---|---|---|
| White | 8,470 | 86.2% |
| Black or African American | 32 | 0.3% |
| American Indian and Alaska Native | 147 | 1.5% |
| Asian | 68 | 0.7% |
| Native Hawaiian and Other Pacific Islander | 13 | 0.1% |
| Some other race | 170 | 1.7% |
| Two or more races | 928 | 9.4% |
| Hispanic or Latino (of any race) | 574 | 5.8% |

== Economy ==
Major employers in Sweet Home include HEVI-Shot, a manufacturer of shotshell ammunition; Cascade Timber Consulting, a timber investment management organization; the

== Arts and culture ==
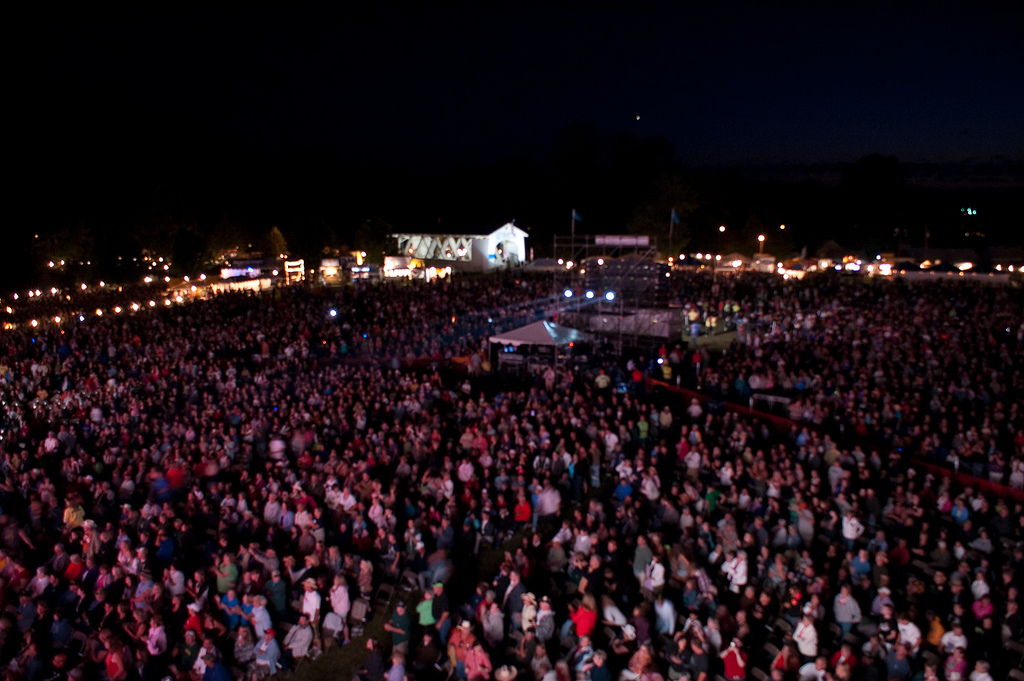
Country music fans watch an evening concert at The Oregon Jamboree in Sweet Home.

=== Annual cultural events ===
- Oregon Jamboree (1992–2025)
- Cut the Gut Car Cruise

=== Covered bridges ===
The Weddle Covered Bridge, relocated from Thomas Creek near Scio, crosses Ames Creek at Sankey Park in Sweet Home. The Crawfordsville Covered Bridge spans the Calapooia River 8 miles (13 km) southwest of Sweet Home and the Short Covered Bridge crosses the South Santiam River 12 miles (19 km) east of Sweet Home.

=== 2018 U.S. Capitol Christmas Tree ===
The 2018 Capitol Christmas Tree, which comes from a different national forest every year, was acquired by the Sweet Home Ranger District (it is named after the town in which it is headquartered). The ranger district, part of the Willamette National Forest, was awarded the opportunity to present the tree to the American people for the 2018 Christmas season.

== Recreation ==
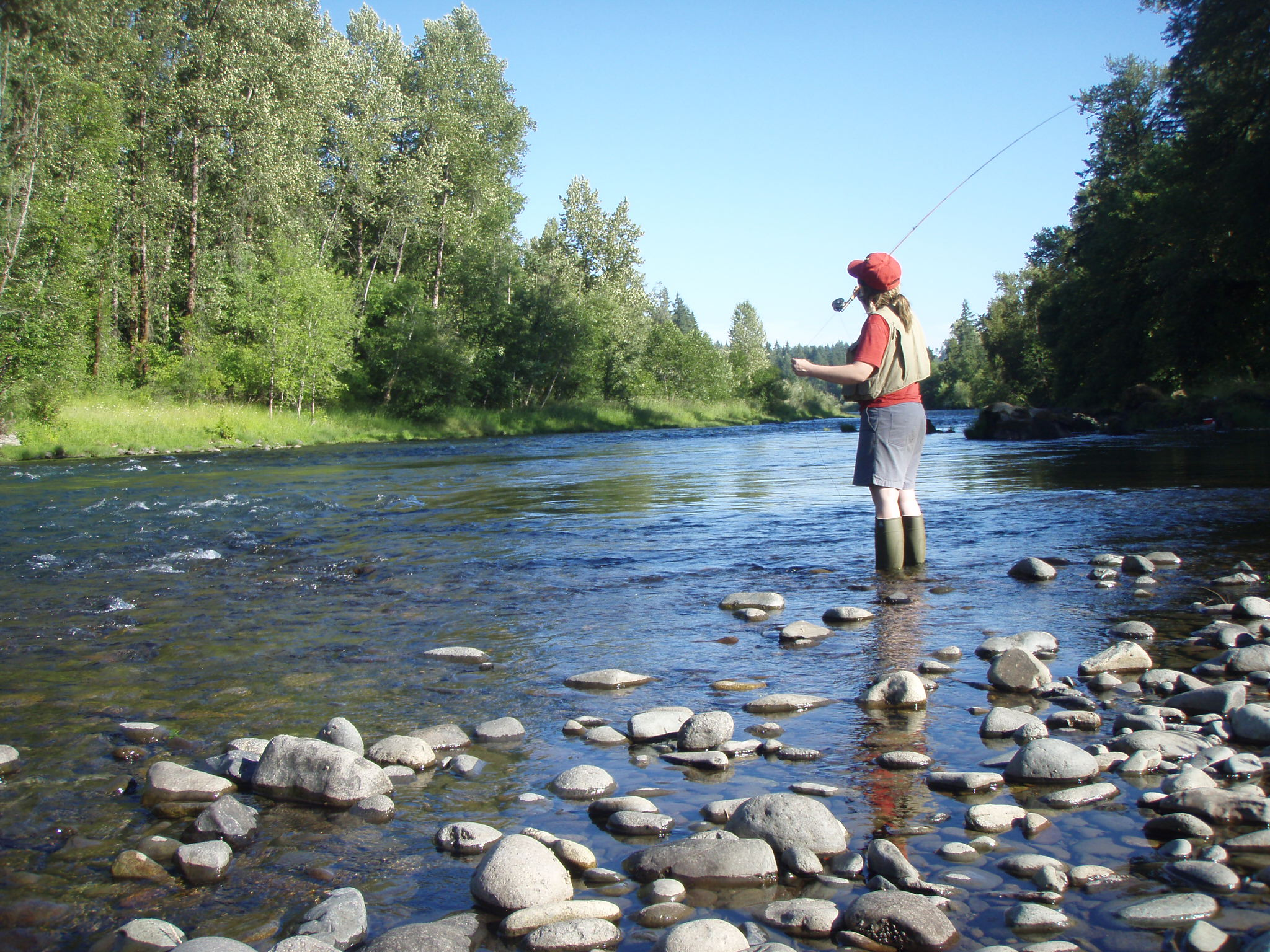
Fly fishing on the South Santiam River near Sweet Home

Sweet Home has seven city parks within city limits, but most recreational opportunities occur outside of town; the nearby wilderness supports boating, hunting, fishing, hiking, white-water sports, camping and gold panning. For this reason, Sweet Home describes itself as the "Gateway to the Santiam Playground."

Foster Reservoir on the South Santiam River has boat ramps and a year-round marina while Green Peter Reservoir provides two improved boat ramps. The South Santiam River offers salmon and steelhead fishing while Quartzville Creek is recognized for Class 4 and Class 5 kayaking.

The South Santiam also supports gold panning, and petrified wood deposits nearby continue to draw attention.

Hiking trails include Horse Rock Ridge, Soda Creek Falls Trail at Cascadia State Park and numerous trails throughout the Willamette National Forest. The Menagerie Wilderness has rock faces amenable to climbing.

An 18-hole golf course, Mallard Creek Golf Club, is 11 miles (18 km) northwest of Sweet Home. The nearest ski resort, Hoo Doo Ski Bowl, is 52 miles (84 km) to the east, near Santiam Pass.

== Transportation ==
Sweet Home public transportation service is provided by Linn Shuttle.

== Education ==
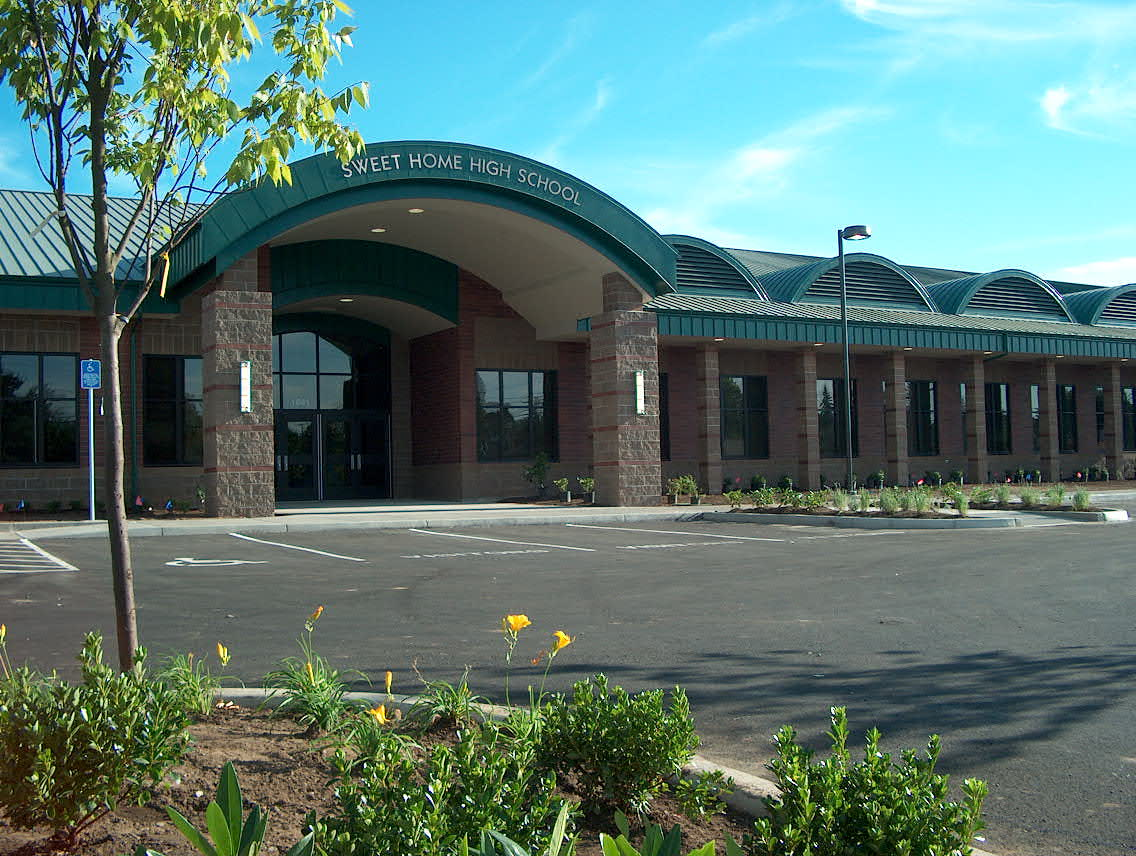
Sweet Home High School

Sweet Home is served by the Sweet Home School District. The district includes Sweet Home High School, a junior high school and four elementary schools. The district covers Sweet Home, Cascadia, Crawfordsville, Holley, Liberty, Pleasant Valley and other surrounding communities.

Linn–Benton Community College operates a branch campus in Sweet Home.

== Media ==
The New Era newspaper is published weekly. The Albany Democrat-Herald also serves the city.

== Notable people ==
- John Arthur Ackroyd (1949–2016) – murderer and suspected serial killer; born in Sweet Home
- Howard Bergerson (1922–2011) – writer; lived in Sweet Home
- Joe Kent – American soldier and politician (born 1980)
- James McCarthy (1944–2019) – professor of biological oceanography at Harvard University, recipient of the 2018 Tyler Prize for Environmental Achievement; raised in Sweet Home
- Ritch Price – head baseball coach for the University of Kansas from 2002 to 2022 and the winningest coach in University of Kansas baseball history
- Matt Slauson (born 1986) – offensive lineman, Los Angeles Chargers; attended and played football for Sweet Home High School
- Robert T. Oliver – scholar of intercultural communication and rhetoric
