= Matt Slauson =

American football player (born 1986)

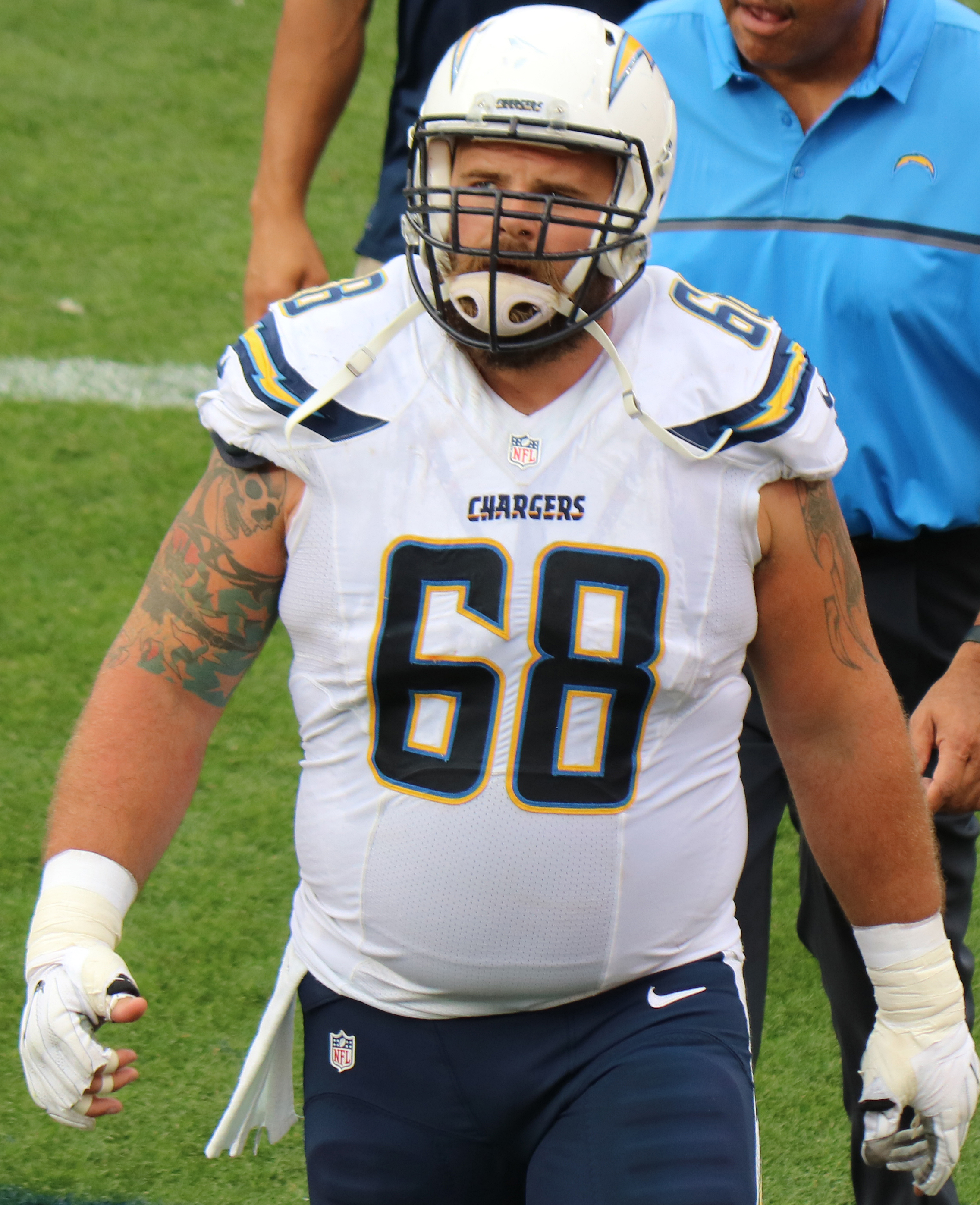
- Slauson with the San Diego Chargers in 2016

No. 68
- Position: Guard

Personal information
- Born: February 18, 1986 (age 40); Cincinnati, Ohio, U.S.
- Listed height: 6 ft 5 in (1.96 m)
- Listed weight: 315 lb (143 kg)

Career information
- High school: Sweet Home (Sweet Home, Oregon)
- College: Nebraska
- NFL draft: 2009: 6th round, 193rd overall pick

Career history
- New York Jets (2009–2012); Chicago Bears (2013–2015); San Diego / Los Angeles Chargers (2016–2017); Indianapolis Colts (2018)

Awards and highlights
- 2× Second-team All-Big 12 (2006, 2008)

Career NFL statistics
- Games played: 116
- Games started: 113
- Fumble recoveries: 1
- Stats at Pro Football Reference

Matthew Benjamin Slauson (born February 18, 1986) is an American former professional football player who was a guard in the National Football League (NFL). He played college football for the Nebraska Cornhuskers and was selected by the New York Jets in the sixth round of the 2009 NFL draft. He also played for the Chicago Bears, San Diego/Los Angeles Chargers, and Indianapolis Colts before retiring after the 2018 season.

== Professional career ==
Pre-draft measurables
Height	Weight	Arm length	Hand span	40-yard dash	10-yard split	20-yard split	20-yard shuttle	Three-cone drill	Vertical jump	Broad jump	Bench press
6 ft 4 7/8 in (1.95 m)	316 lb (143 kg)	33 1/8 in (0.84 m)	10 1/2 in (0.27 m)	5.26 s	1.78 s	2.97 s	4.74 s	7.41 s	34.0 in (0.86 m)	9 ft 2 in (2.79 m)	23 reps

=== New York Jets ===
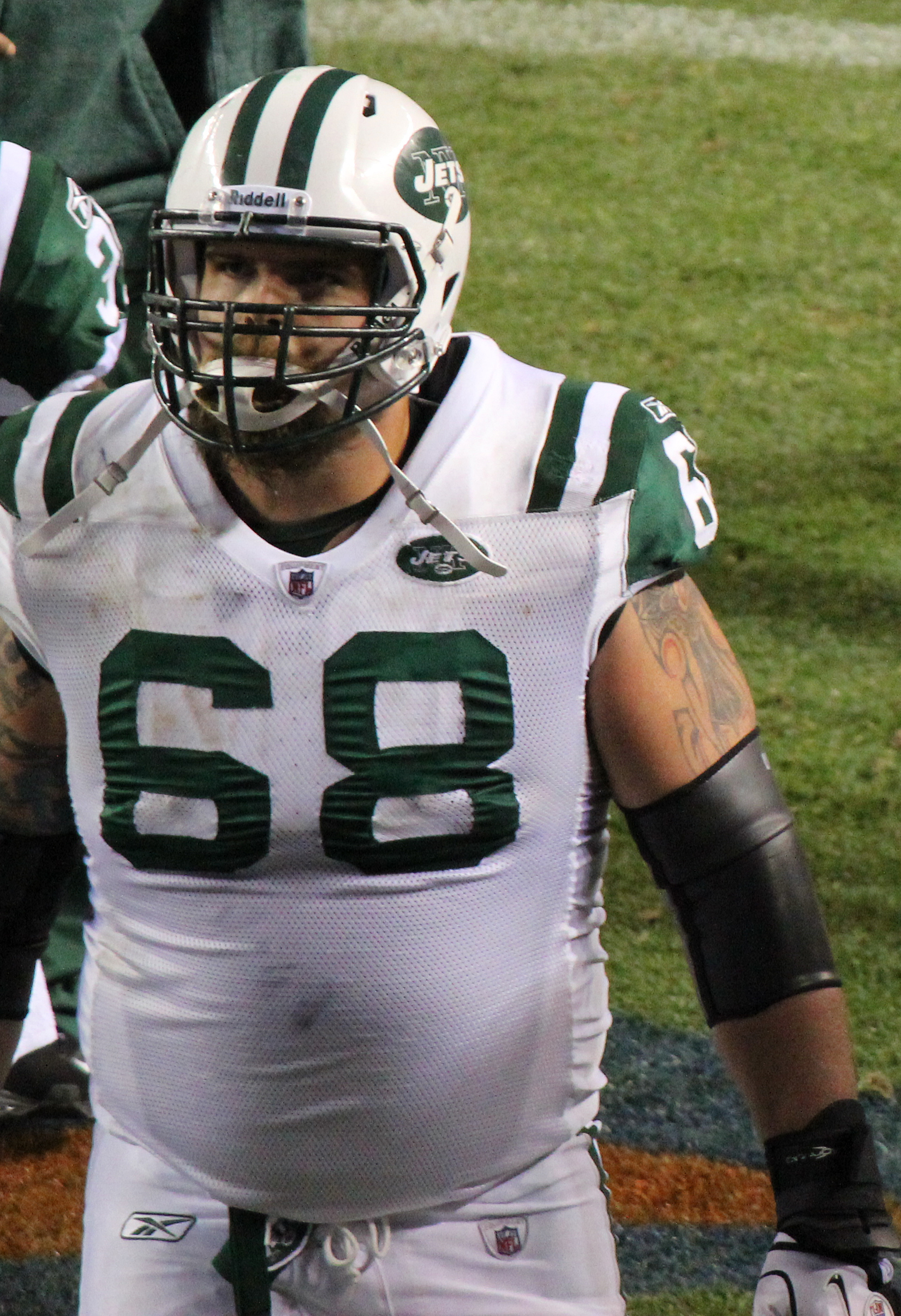
Slauson with the Jets

The New York Jets selected Slauson with their sixth round pick in the 2009 NFL draft. The Jets offensive line coach Bill Callahan previously coached Slauson at Nebraska and considered him versatile, athletic, and durable. Slauson was signed to a four-year deal by the team in May. Slauson would appear in three regular season games in 2009 playing at the guard and center positions respectively.

Following the team's selection of Vladimir Ducasse in the 2010 NFL draft, the Jets would release veteran guard Alan Faneca. During the team's training camp sessions, Slauson battled Ducasse to replace Faneca. On September 9, 2010, Slauson would be named the team's starting left guard.

Slauson became the subject of criticism after utilizing a cut block against Brian Cushing that resulted in Cushing tearing his ACL on October 8, 2012. The play was considered legal by USA Today as both were within three yards of the line of scrimmage where an offensive lineman is allowed to low block a defensive player; the Houston Chronicle contended that the block itself was legal but the location of the block was not. Cushing, when asked about the play, stated "It's football. It's part of the game... it happened to me, and I've been on the other side of that, so I know how it goes." Slauson was fined $10,000 by the league after they determined that he used an illegal peel-back block.

=== Chicago Bears ===
On March 29, 2013, Slauson signed a one-year deal with the Chicago Bears. On January 2, 2014, Slauson was re-signed by the Bears to a four-year contract. On January 24, Slauson was named to the USA Today All-Joe Team.

In 2014, in a 51–23 loss to the New England Patriots, Slauson tore his right pectoral muscle and was ruled out for the rest of the season. On April 7, 2015, Slauson was awarded the Ed Block Courage Award.

On May 1, 2016, Slauson was released by the Bears.

=== San Diego / Los Angeles Chargers ===
Slauson signed a two-year contract with the San Diego Chargers on May 7, 2016. In his first year with the Chargers, he started all 16 games at center.

Slauson entered the 2017 season as the Chargers' starting left guard. In Week 7, he suffered a season-ending biceps injury and was placed on injured reserve.

=== Indianapolis Colts ===
On March 20, 2018, Slauson signed with the Indianapolis Colts on a one-year, $3 million deal, reuniting with former Jets offensive line coach Dave DeGuglielmo. He was named the starting right guard to start the season, starting the first five games before being placed on injured reserve on October 8, 2018.

=== Retirement ===
On February 6, 2019, Slauson announced his retirement from the NFL after 10 seasons.

== Personal life ==
Slauson was born in Sweet Home, Oregon, to Nancy and Robert Slauson and played football at Sweet Home High School in Oregon before graduating from Air Academy High School in Colorado Springs, Colorado. From a young age, Slauson was diagnosed with stuttering, a speech disorder that occurs primarily when he is placed in unfamiliar situations. Slauson has two other brothers, Nick and Chris, as well as a sister, Alli.

Slauson is married to Cami, and the couple has a son.

Slauson is a nephew of Jim Thurber, best known for his appearances on Discovery's TV show "Gold Rush".
