= Crawfordsville Bridge =

Covered bridge in Oregon, US

- U.S. National Register of Historic Places
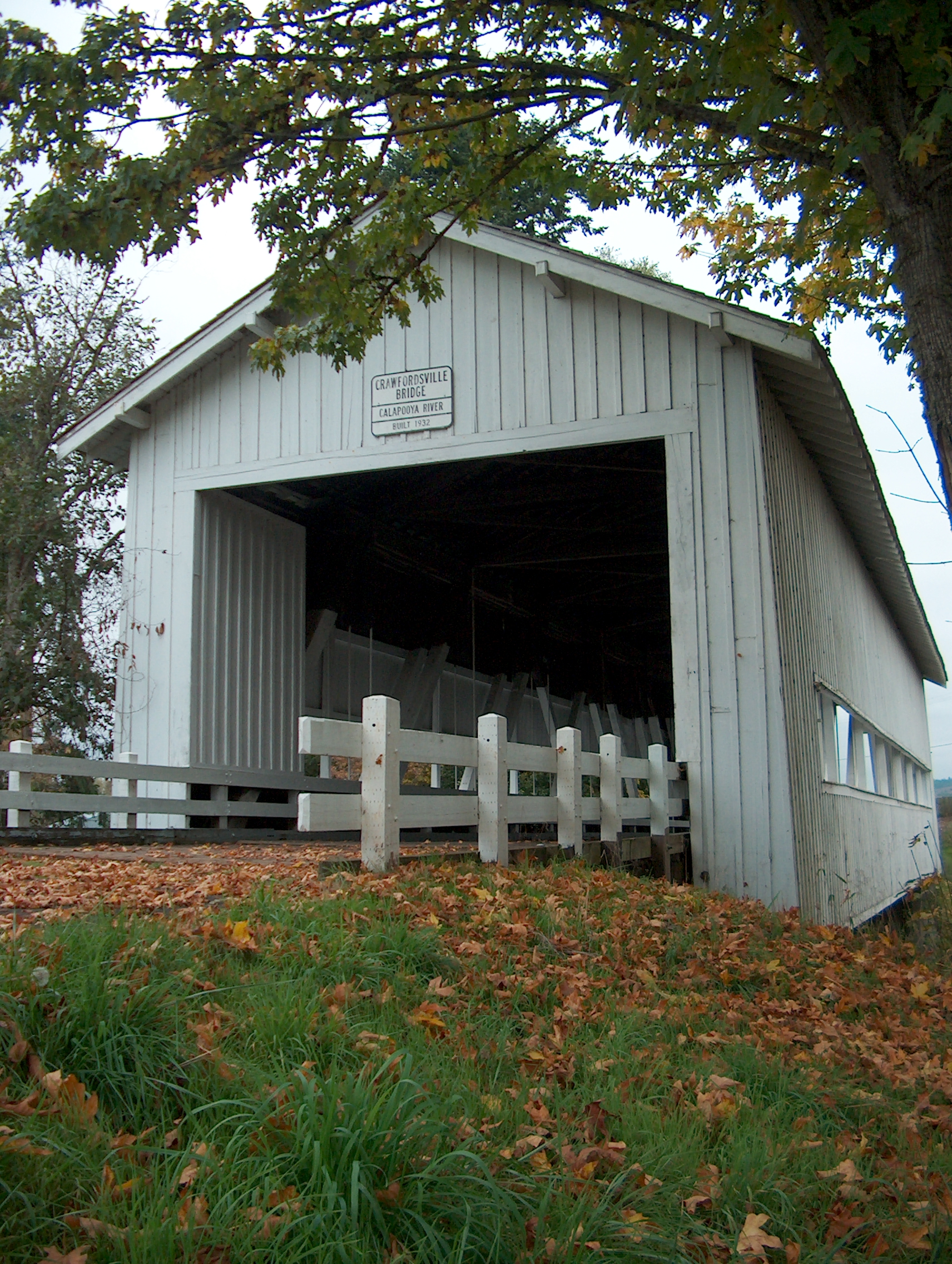
- The Crawfordsville Covered Bridge crosses the Calapooia River

- Location within Oregon Location within the United States
- Location: SR 228, Crawfordsville, Oregon
- Coordinates: 44°21′28″N 122°51′32″W
- Area: 0.2 acres (0.081 ha)
- Built: 1932
- Architectural style: Howe Truss
- MPS: Oregon Covered Bridges TR
- NRHP reference No.: 79002115
- Added to NRHP: November 29, 1979

The Crawfordsville Bridge spans the Calapooia River adjacent to Oregon Route 228 near the community of Crawfordsville in Linn County, Oregon, United States.

The 105-foot Howe truss type bridge was built in 1932. The bridge was bypassed in 1963 and is now maintained by the Linn County Parks & Recreation Department as a pedestrian bridge across the river. Since 1990, the bridge has been the site of a Bridge Day festival held annually in the summer. A small park next to the bridge includes a picnic table and fire pit.

The bridge was featured in the 1976 television movie The Flood.

The bridge is listed on the National Register of Historic Places.

== See also ==
- List of bridges on the National Register of Historic Places in Oregon
