= Horse Rock Ridge =

Ridgetop in Oregon, United States

Coordinates: 44°18′04″N 122°53′07″W

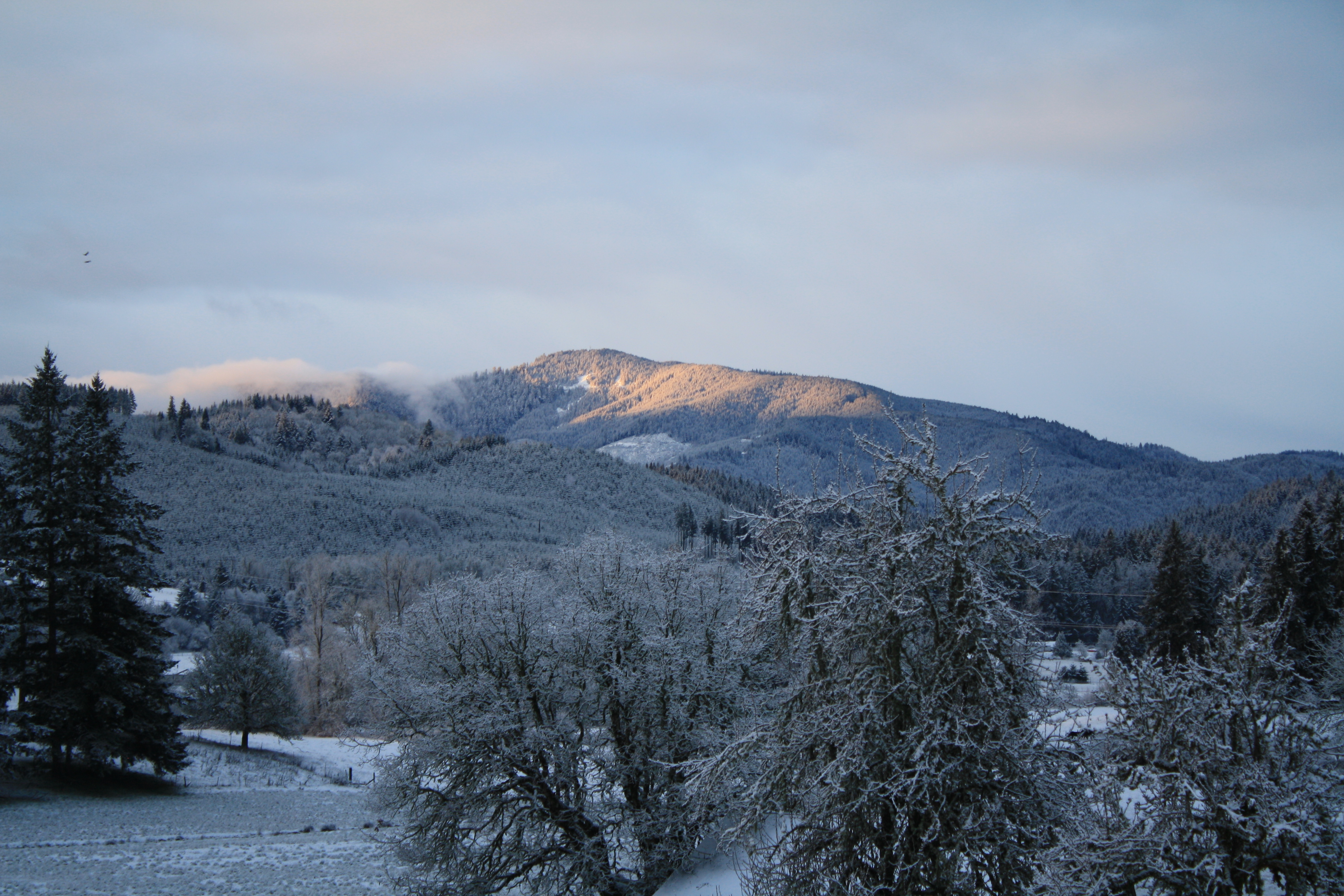
Horse Rock Ridge viewed from between Holley and Crawfordsville, Oregon

Horse Rock Ridge is a ridgetop located on the western edge of the Cascade Range near Crawfordsville, Oregon, US. The site is recognized for its considerable diversity of plant species that includes both Willamette Valley plants as well as plants more often found in the mountain zone of the Cascade Range. There are also several plant species more often found east of the Cascade Range.

The Horse Rock Ridge Research Natural Area (RNA) is managed by the Bureau of Land Management (BLM). It is designated by the BLM as both an RNA and an Area of Critical Environmental Concern (ACEC).

Elevations within the RNA vary from 1,550 feet (472 m) to 2,864 feet (873 m).

== Hiking trail ==
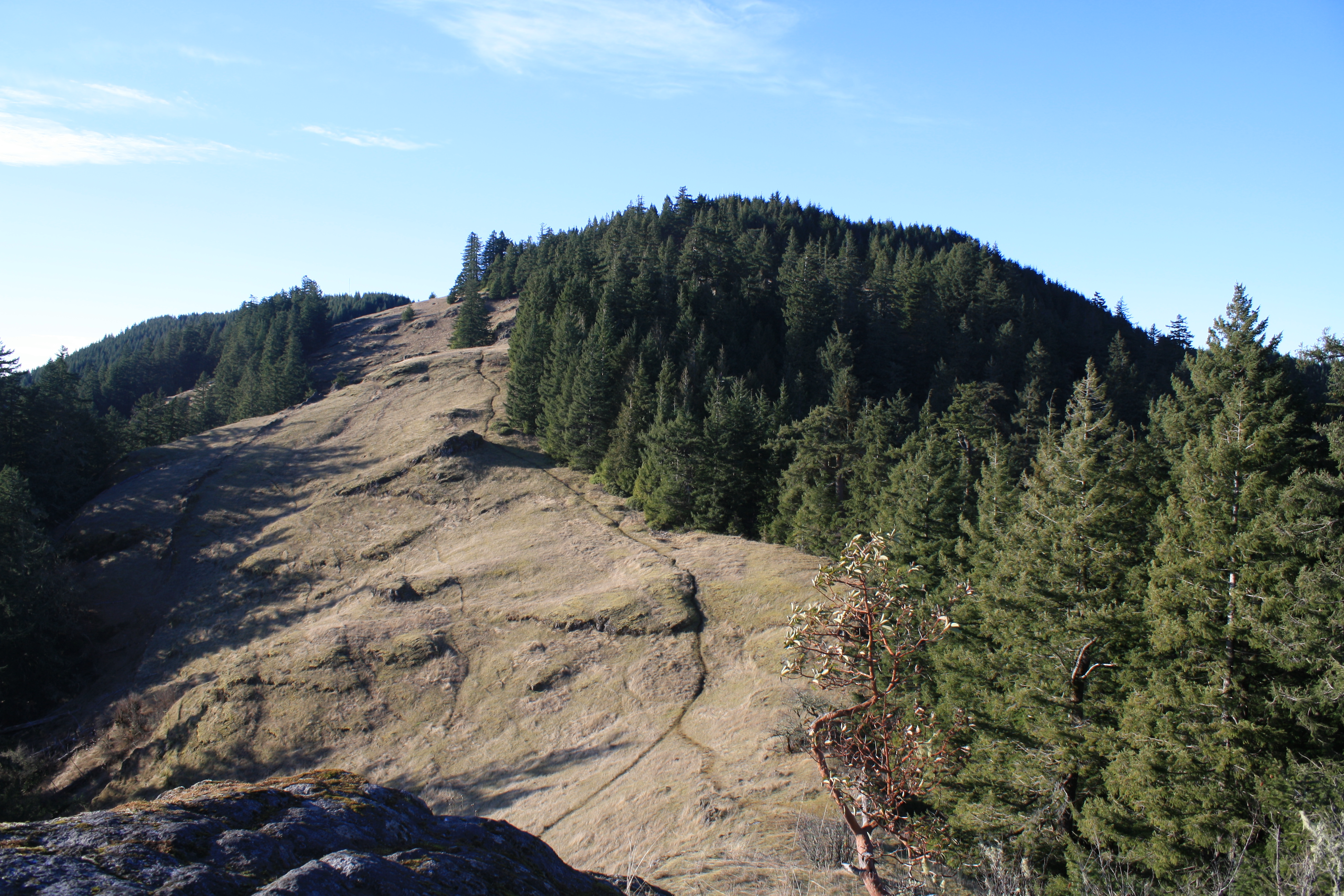
A trail leads to the summit of Horse Rock Ridge

A hiking trail on Horse Rock Ridge includes views of the Three Sisters, Mount Jefferson and other Cascade peaks.
