= Sweet Home School District =

School district in Oregon, United States

Location
- Linn County Greater Sweet Home, Oregon United States

District information
- Type: Public
- Grades: K-12
- Superintendent: Terry Martin
- Budget: $29 million

Students and staff
- Students: 2,347
- Athletic conference: Sky-Em

Other information
- High schools: 1
- Junior high schools: 1
- Elementary schools: 4
- Website: shsd55or.gov

The Sweet Home School District (#55) is a public school district serving Sweet Home, Oregon, United States and the surrounding communities of Crawfordsville, Holley, Cascadia, and Liberty, and the Pleasant Valley area.

== History ==
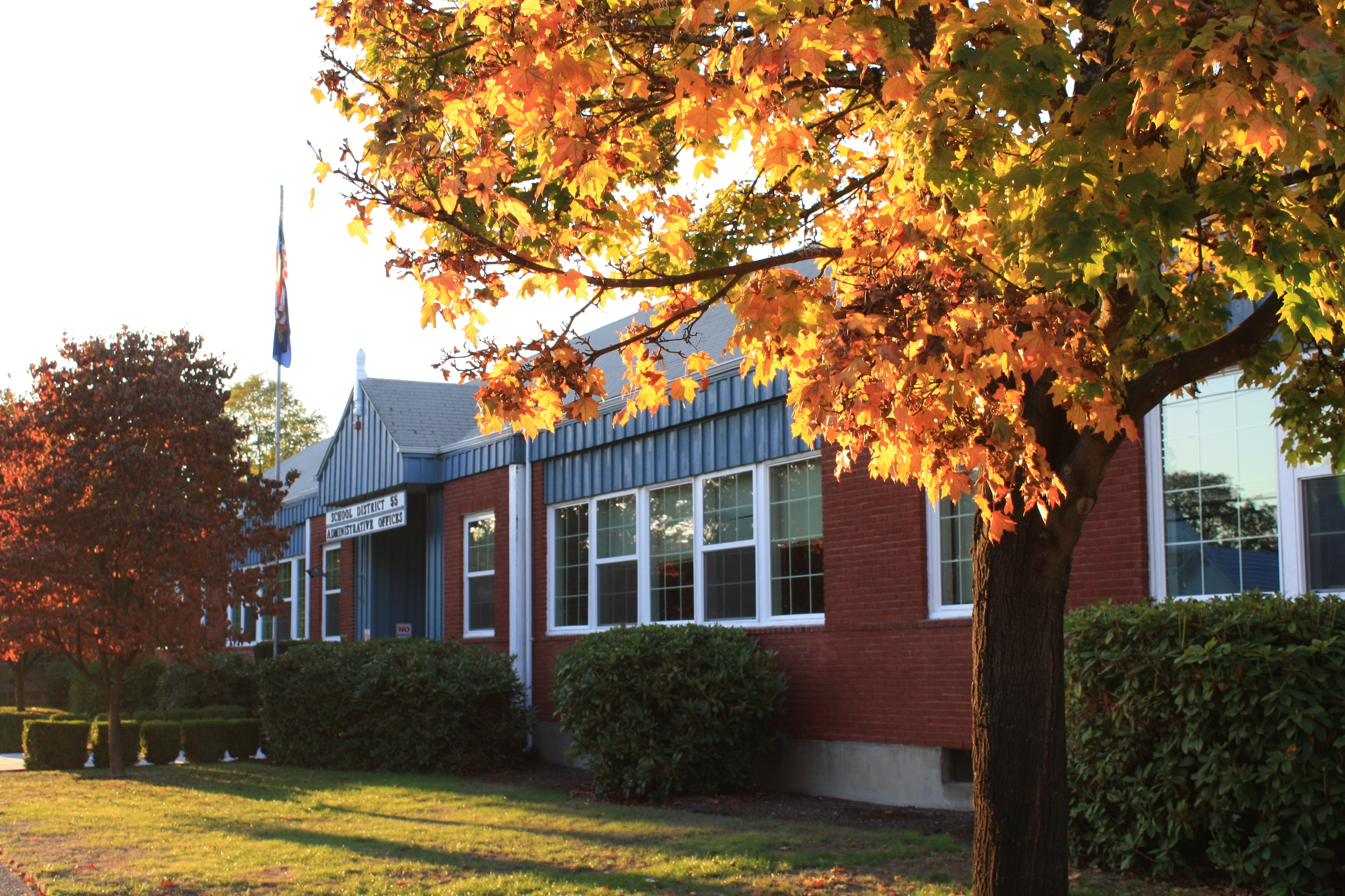
The Sweet Home School District administrative office

=== Early history ===
The district was incorporated on December 20, 1964 following a recommendation from the Linn County reorganization committee that the Crawfordsville, Holley, Cascadia, Liberty, Foster, Sweet Home Elementary and Sweet Home Union High School districts be consolidated into one administrative district. Prior to consolidation, Sweet Home Union High School's history dates back to 1912.

=== Modern history ===
In 1990, the district was the largest recipient in the state of tax revenues from private timber harvest.

In 195 William Hampton, previously superintendent of the Burns Elementary School District, was scheduled to become the superintendent of this district.

In 2011, The Center for American Progress recognized the Sweet Home School District for receiving the organization's highest Return on Investment score in a nationwide study comparing student achievement relative to available funding. Sweet Home, North Clackamas and Gladstone were the only school districts in Oregon to receive the organization's highest achievement score in all areas measured.

== Schools ==
=== High school ===
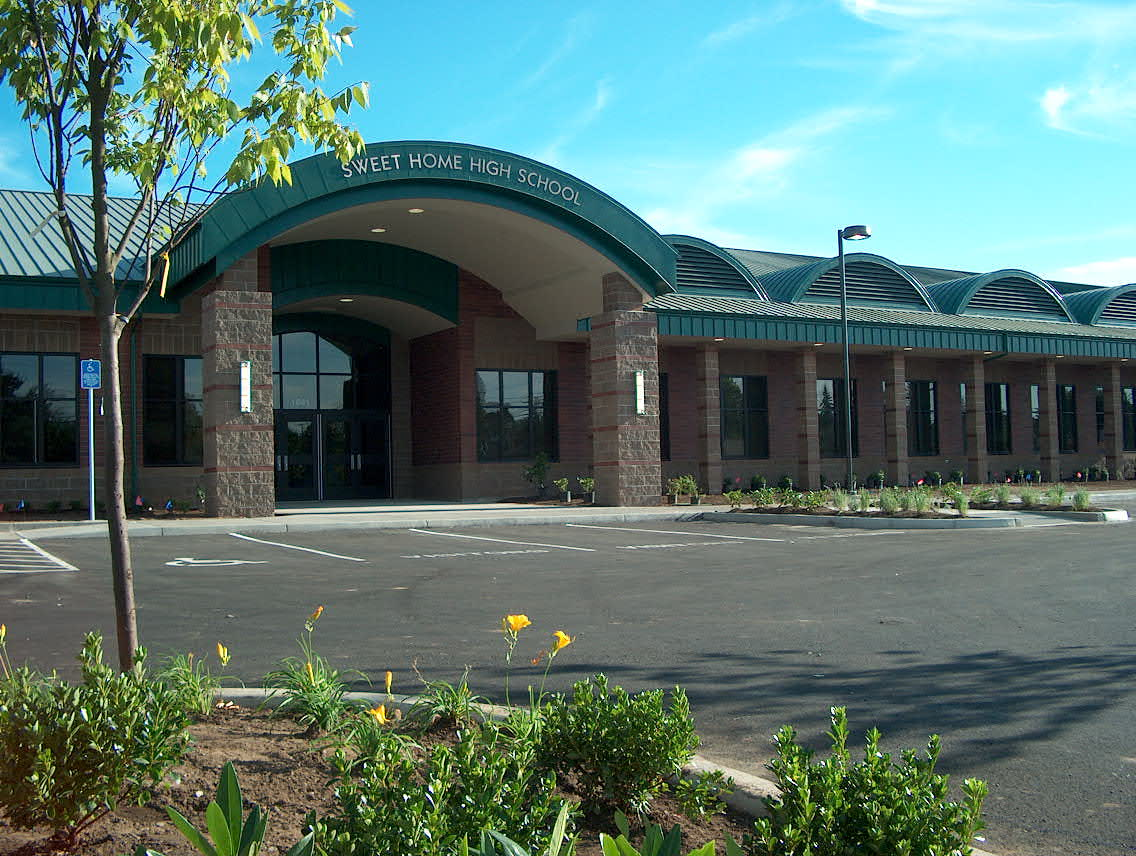
Sweet Home High School

Sweet Home High School is a comprehensive high school serving approximately 750 students in grades 9 through 12.

=== Junior high school ===
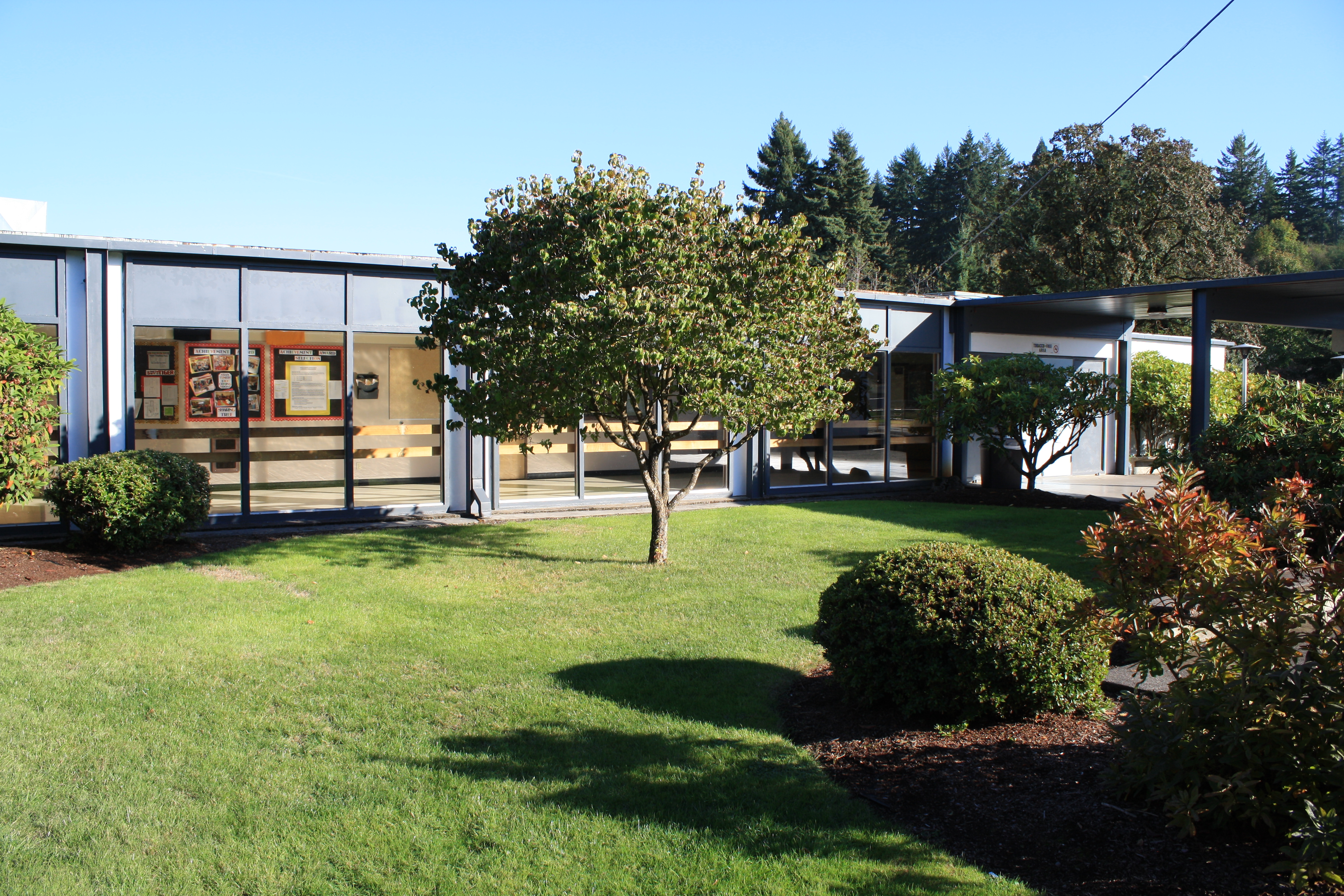
Sweet Home Junior High School

Sweet Home Junior High School serves approximately 400 seventh and eighth grade students.

=== Elementary schools ===
Foster Elementary

Foster Elementary is a Kindergarten through sixth grade school located on the eastern edge of Sweet Home near Foster Reservoir.

Hawthorne Elementary

Hawthorne Elementary is a Kindergarten through sixth grade school located on Long Street in Sweet Home.

Holley Elementary

Holley Elementary is a Kindergarten through sixth grade school located in the community of Holley four miles southwest of Sweet Home.

Oak Heights Elementary

Oak Heights Elementary is a Kindergarten through sixth grade school located in the west side of Sweet Home.

== Former schools ==
- Crawfordsville School
- Liberty School
- Long Street School
- Pleasant Valley School
- Cascadia School

== See also ==
- List of school districts in Oregon
