= SHHS =

The abbreviation SHHS may refer to:

- Sacred Heart High School in Hammersmith, London
- Sacred Heart High School in Roseville, Michigan, United States
- St. Helens High School in St. Helens, Oregon, United States
- Science Hill High School in Johnson City, Tennessee, United States
- Shadow Hills High School in Indio, California, United States
- Shaker Heights High School in Shaker Heights, Ohio, United States
- Smiths Hill High School in Wollongong, Australia
- Smoky Hill High School in Aurora, Colorado, United States
- South Hadley High School in South Hadley, Massachusetts, United States
- South Hampstead High School in Camden, London, United Kingdom
- South Hills High School (West Covina, California), United States
- Strath Haven High School in Wallingford, Pennsylvania, United States
- Stuart Hall High School in San Francisco, California, United States
- Sunny Hills High School in Fullerton, California, United States
- Sweet Home High School (disambiguation)
- Sylvan Hills High School in Sherwood, Arkansas, United States
- Sacred Heart High School in Yonkers, New York, United States
