= Oregon Jamboree =

Music festival in Sweet Home, Oregon, U.S.

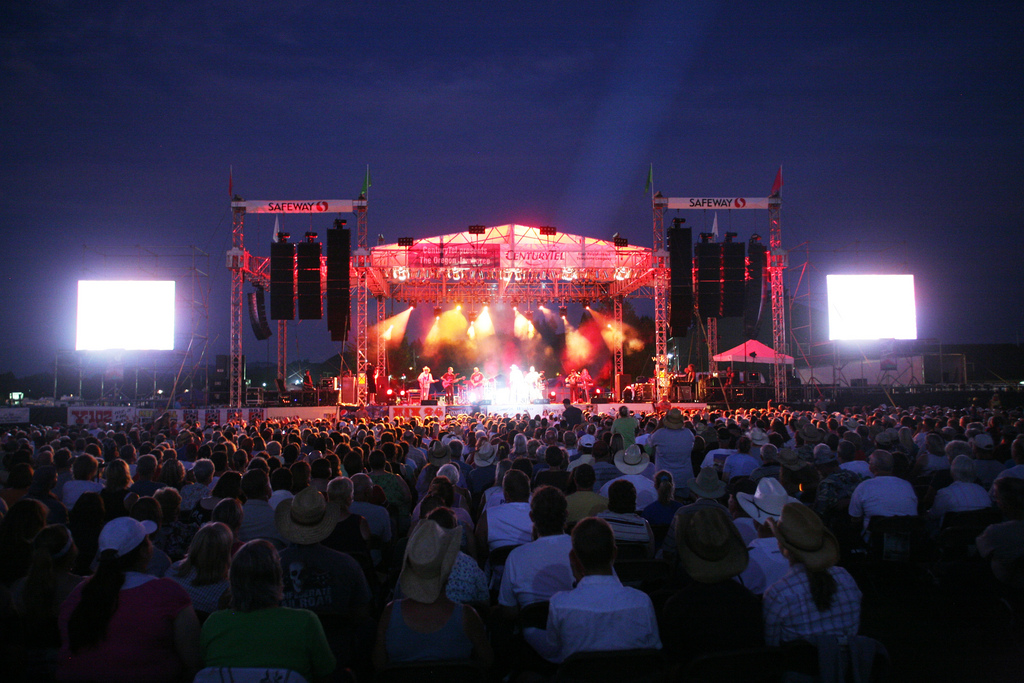
- The Oregon Jamboree main stage
- Genre: Country
- Location: Sweet Home, Oregon
- Years active: 1992–2019; 2021–2025
- Founders: Marge Geil and Leslie Ancke
- Website: oregonjamboree.com

The Oregon Jamboree was a country music and camping festival held in Sweet Home, Oregon, United States.

The event, and the nonprofit organization that ran it, was founded in 1992 as an economic development project for the Sweet Home community. In addition to funding economic development activities, profits from the festival helped support community humanitarian projects. The festival site was located on a large field south of Sweet Home High School. The venue extended across the Weddle Covered Bridge to Sankey Park. In 2010, attendance exceeded 13,000 people per day. The 34th and final Oregon Jamboree was held in 2025.

== History ==
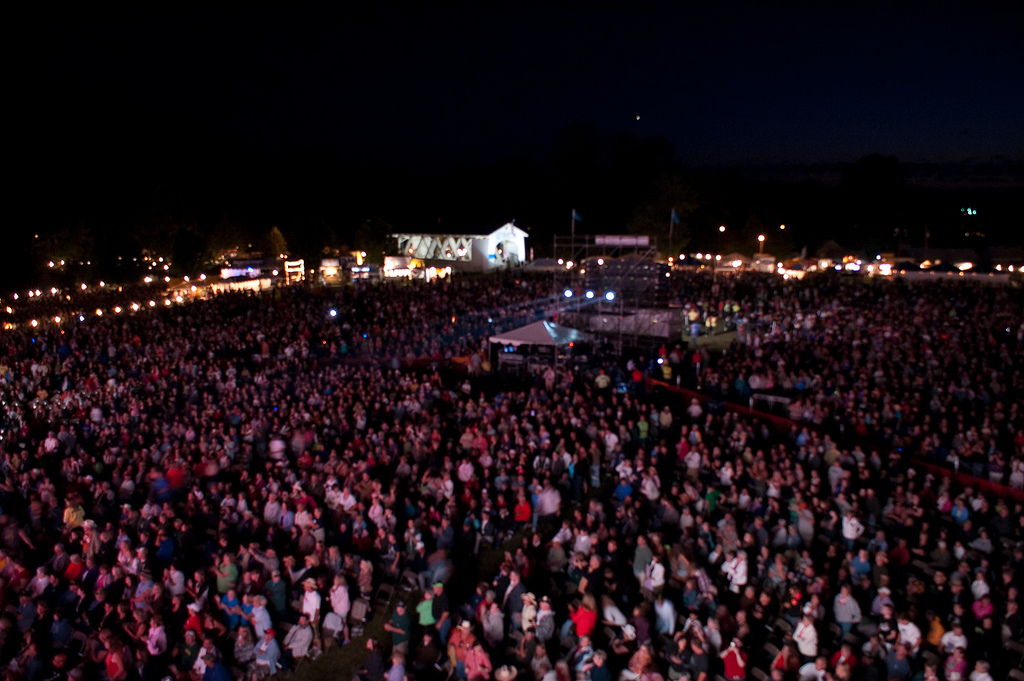
The crowd at the 2011 Jamboree; Weddle Covered Bridge in the background

The Oregon Jamboree was founded in 1992 by Marge Geil and Leslie Anke. The festival was managed by The Sweet Home Economic Development Group. The organization was founded to economically support Sweet Home and surrounding areas in Linn County after regulations and limitations on the logging industry reduced income of local residents.

No Jamboree was held in 2020, due to the COVID-19 pandemic and resulting state restrictions on large gatherings. The next festival was held in 2021, and festivals continued normally on an annual basis after that.

The 34th and final Jamboree was held August 1–3, 2025. The organizers said that they were ending the Jamboree program because the costs to run the festival were no longer sustainable, and so they felt that the organization "could no longer serve [their] mission to support rural economic development in the Willamette Valley."

== Performers ==
Performers over the years included The Bellamy Brothers, Dierks Bentley, Sawyer Brown, Kenny Chesney, Ashley Cooke, Billy Ray Cyrus, Jordan Davis, Jackson Dean, Brett Eldredge, Jeff Foxworthy, The Frontmen, Montgomery Gentry, The Grascals, Faith Hill, Steve Holy, Ryan Hurd, Toby Keith, LoCash, Tim McGraw, Jo Dee Messina, Kylie Morgan, Maren Morris, Heidi Newfield, Joe Nichols, Brad Paisley, Ricochet, LeAnn Rimes, Darius Rucker, Shane Smith and The Saints, Carrie Underwood, Keith Urban, and Clay Walker.

== See also ==
- List of country music festivals
- List of music festivals in the United States
- Music of Oregon
- Oregon Festival of American Music
- Watershed Music Festival
