= Sweet Home High School =

Sweet Home High School may refer to:

- Sweet Home High School (New York), located in Amherst, New York
- Sweet Home High School (Oregon), located in Sweet Home, Oregon

== See also ==
- Sweet Home (disambiguation)
