= Sweet Home =

Sweet Home or Sweethome may refer to:

== Places in the United States ==
- Sweet Home, Arkansas
- Sweet Home Central School District in Amherst and Tonawanda, New York
  - Sweet Home High School (Amherst, New York), a New York State public high school
- Sweet Home High School (Oregon), a public high school in Sweet Home, Oregon, United States
- Sweet Home Mine in Colorado
- Sweet Home, Oregon
- Sweet Home, Lavaca County, Texas
  - Sweet Home Independent School District, a public school district based in the community of Sweet Home, Texas (USA)
- Sweethome, Oklahoma

== Entertainment ==
=== Film, TV, web and video game ===
- Sweet Home (1989 film), a Japanese horror film
  - Sweet Home (video game), a 1989 role-playing video game based on the film
- Sweet Home (2015 film), a Polish–Spanish horror film
- Sweet Home (webtoon), a 2017 South Korean horror-apocalyptic webtoon by Kim Carnby and Hwang Young-chan
  - Sweet Home (TV series), a South Korean television series based from the webtoon

=== Literature ===
- Sweet Home, a fictional slave plantation from Toni Morrison's Beloved

== Other uses ==
- Sweet Home 3D, a floorplan editor for a house, with 3D previews
