= The Times (Brownsville) =

Weekly newspaper published in Brownsville, Oregon

The Brownsville Times
- Type: Weekly newspaper
- Founder(s): Albert B. Cavender; Arthur S. McDonald
- Publisher: Mikayle Stole
- Founded: 1888
- Ceased publication: December 5, 2024
- Relaunched: June 5, 2025
- Language: English
- Headquarters: 343 Main St., Brownsville, OR 97327
- Website: brownsvilletimes.org

The Brownsville Times is a weekly newspaper published in Brownsville, Oregon, United States.

== History ==
The Times was established in 1888 by Albert B. Cavender and Arthur S. McDonald, who built up a circulation of 700 in the paper's first two years. McDonald sold his ownership stake to Fred M. Brown, who later became the sole owner when Cavender also sold out. Brown operated the paper for about 25 years until selling it in 1921 to Jesse R. Hinman.

A. L. Bostwick and Glenn W. Loomis owned the Brownsville Times and Lebanon Criterion until dissolving their partnership in 1923. Loomis sold The Times a year later to A. M. Byrd and Miles E. Taylor. In 1930, Brown, who sold the paper nine years earlier to serve as deputy state game warden of Portland, required the paper. Leo E. Giles purchased the paper from Brown's wife in 1939, and then sold it a decade later to John L. Roberts, who in turn sold it to Chester "Chet" L. Harding in 1964.

Roberts required the paper in 1968 and sold it in 1985 to Ralph E. Sand. Don Ware bought the paper in 1995, and served as Brownsville mayor while running The Times. Ware sold the paper to husband-and wife Vance and Holly Parrish in 2011. The newspaper published its last issue on Dec. 5, 2024. It had 250 subscribers at the time of closure.

A nonprofit soon formed and by March 2025 was seeking to relaunch the Times. The organization's goal was to raise $50,000 and to get commitments from at least 800 subscribers and multiple advertisers in order to revive the paper. The Times resumed publishing under nonprofit ownership six months after its closure on June 5, 2025. After a year, the paper had one paid staff and 52 volunteers, with 1,000 copies printed weekly.
