= Menagerie Wilderness =

American wilderness area

- IUCN category Ib (wilderness area)
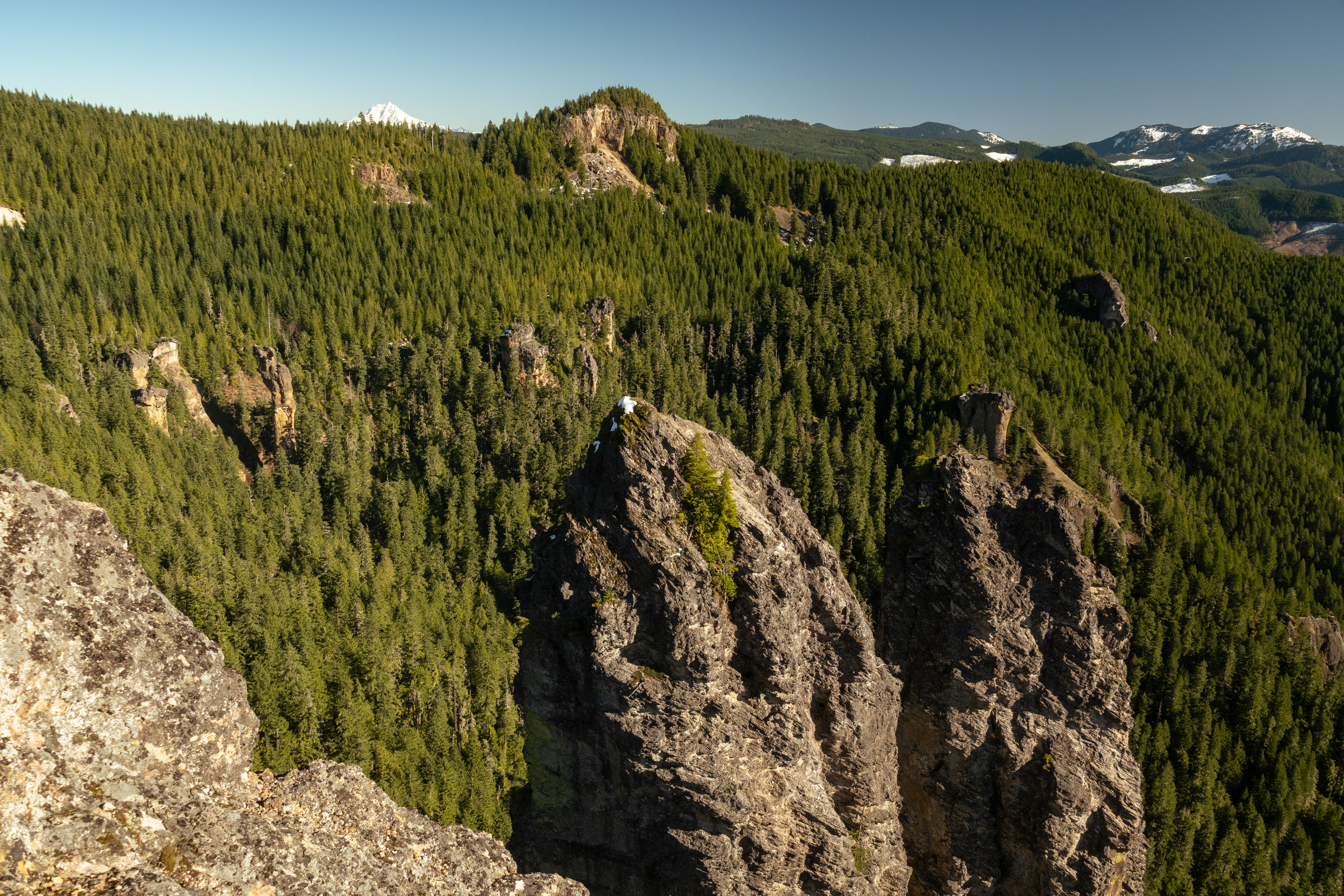
- View looking east as rock pillars rise above the forest surrounding Keith Creek

- Location within Oregon
- Location: Linn County, Oregon, United States
- Nearest city: Sweet Home, Oregon
- Coordinates: 44°25′44.03″N 122°18′21.58″W
- Area: 5,033 acres (2,037 ha)
- Established: 1984
- Governing body: United States Forest Service

The Menagerie Wilderness is a designated wilderness area located near Mount Washington in the central Cascade Range of Oregon. It is situated near Highway 20 within the Willamette National Forest and is managed by the US Forest Service.

== Geography ==
The Menagerie Wilderness is situated around a series of rock pinnacles each uniquely named from the imagination of past climbers; hence the name, Menagerie. The best known, and most popular, is Rooster Rock. Others include Hen Rock, Turkey Monster, and Chicken Rock.

== Recreation ==
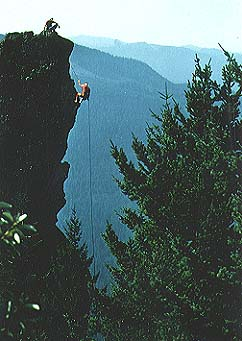
Rock climber rappelling Rooster Rock, Menagerie Wilderness

The primary recreational activities in Menagerie Wilderness are hiking and rock climbing, but camping and wildlife watching are popular among some visitors. There are only a few established trails in the Menagerie, most notably Trout Creek Trail and Rooster Rock Trail – both of which lead to Rooster Rock. Visiting other pinnacles requires a cross-country hike over steep, rugged terrain.

== Vegetation ==
Vegetation in Menagerie Wilderness is primarily second-growth Douglas-fir, western hemlock, and western red cedar. Much of the understory consists of vine maple, salal, and sword fern.

== See also ==
- List of Oregon Wildernesses
- List of U.S. Wilderness Areas
- Wilderness Act
