= Linn Shuttle =

Bus system in Oregon, USA

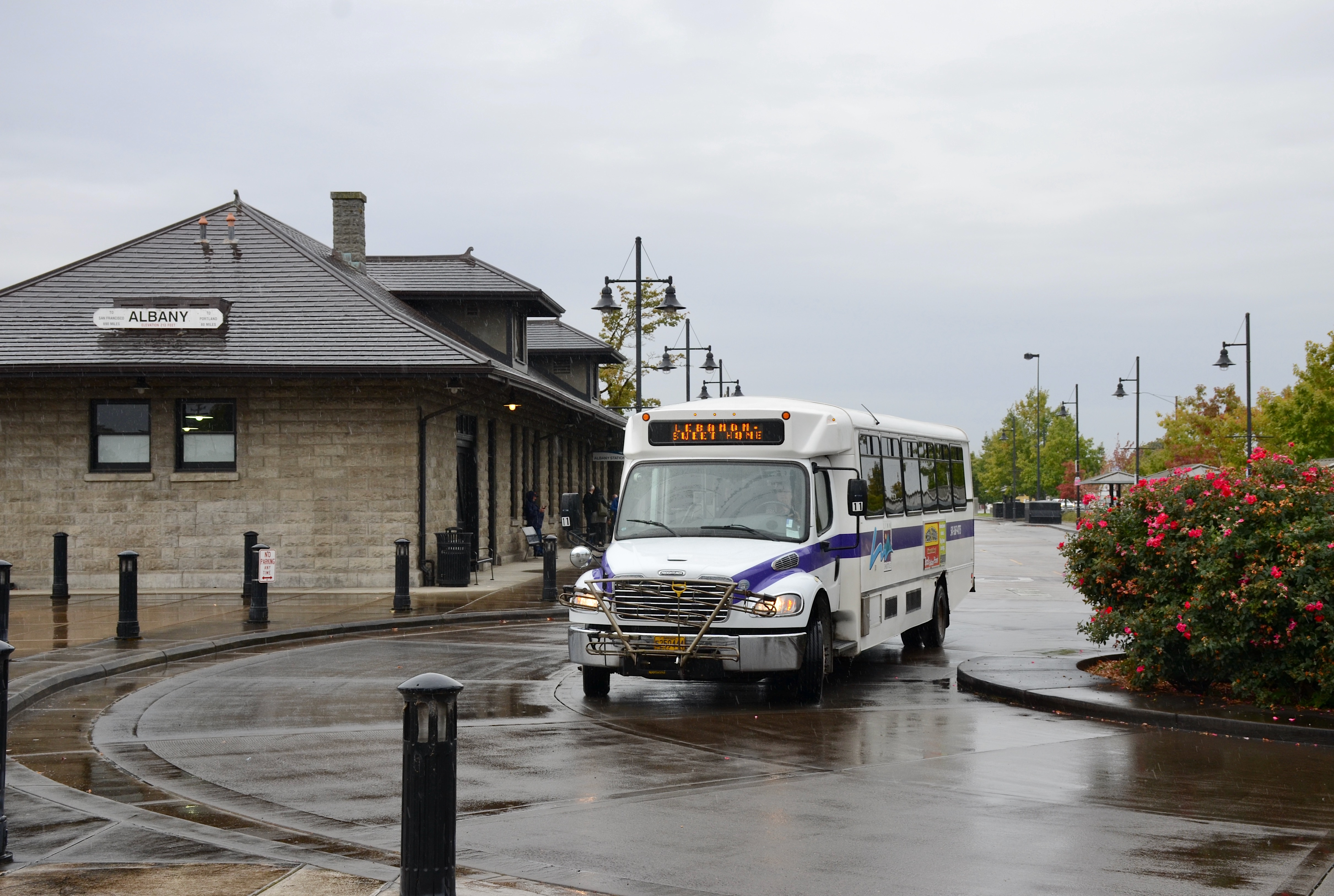
- Linn Shuttle bus departing the Albany Amtrak station
- Parent: Senior Citizens of Sweet Home, Inc.
- Locale: Sweet Home, Oregon
- Service area: Linn County, Oregon
- Service type: Local bus service
- Routes: 4 (2 are seasonal)
- Fuel type: Diesel and Propane
- Website: www.linnshuttle.com

The Linn Shuttle bus system serves the Sweet Home and Linn County, Oregon area. It operates a fixed-route shuttle service around Sweet Home, serving Sweet Home, Albany, and Lebanon in Linn County. The shuttle also connects to Albany Transit, Linn-Benton Loop, Corvallis Transit, Greyhound and Amtrak.

In 2015, the Linn Shuttle added two Blue Bird Vision Propane buses to its fleet, used primarily on the main Linn Shuttle route. The Linn Shuttle also uses 2013 Freightliner buses. The Linn Shuttle still uses a Chevrolet bus and a Ford bus as back-up buses.
