= The New Era (newspaper) =

Weekly newspaper published in Sweet Home, Oregon

- Type: Weekly newspaper
- Format: Broadsheet
- Owner(s): GCC Media, LLC
- Founder(s): G. H. Crusen
- Publisher: Chris Chapman
- Founded: 1929
- Language: English
- Headquarters: 1313 Main Street, Sweet Home, Oregon United States
- Circulation: 1,678
- OCLC number: 30721939
- Website: sweethomenews.com

The New Era is a newspaper in Sweet Home in the U.S. state of Oregon. It has been published weekly since its inception in 1929, and covers east Linn County. News historian George S. Turnbull opined in his 1939 History of Oregon Newspapers that despite the city's small size, the paper had been "lively and well made up."

== Regional renown ==
At the time of the New Era's founding, the Sweet Home had already attracted attention outside its immediate area. Turnbull noted the columns of Mrs. Ole M. Feigum, a "wide-eyed country correspondent" chronicling the local habitat, who had served for several years as a correspondent to Portland's much larger Oregonian, and who later earned national recognition as a "country correspondent." In covering the New Era's launch, the Oregonian challenged the New Era to live up to Feigum's having "given renown to her dwelling place."

Newspapers from larger population centers in Oregon have continued to cite the New Era's coverage of the Sweet Home area since its establishment. The Oregonian cited the New Era's coverage of a local Stewart Holbrook speech, in analyzing the controversial nature of the writer's advocacy around migration to Oregon. Its publishers and journalists have been quoted numerous times by neighboring papers, as experts on Sweet Home news. New Era publisher Alex Paul was interviewed about his economic predictions for the region in 2000, and a 2017 story revisited that interview. Many smaller examples span recent decades.

== Founding and ownership ==
The New Era was the first newspaper to take hold in Sweet Home. Prior to the founding of the New Era, the Intermountain Tribune was briefly based in Sweet Home in 1913 to 1914. Owner T. L. Dugger moved it there from Lebanon, and later moved it again to Scio.

G. H. Crusen founded the New Era in 1929, as a weekly four page paper. John T. Russell was the publisher as of 1939; Turnbull identified his principal goal as preserving the town during the planning of dams for the Willamette Valley hydroelectric project. Russell, who had previously been in the newspaper business in Ohio, owned the paper until 1946, including a period of partnership with Dave MacMillan.

William L. Dudley and A. E. Macoubrie were the publishers from 1946 to 1970, and later publishers included John & Jack Nelson, Connie Johnson, and David O. Cooper. In the late 1960s, "journalistic maverick" Bill Wickland served as the paper's editor, running a provocative column called "The Wacky World of Bill Wickland." Circulation increased 25% in his first six months. But he was considered a "crazy radical," and was dismissed after a change in management.

The Nelson group, which then owned the Springfield News, purchased the paper in 1970 after the previous publisher died.

Dave Cooper, who had served as news editor for the New Era and more recently for newspapers in Astoria, purchased the paper with his wife in 1972.

Alex and Debra Paul bought the paper from the Coopers in 1985. Alex Paul served as president of the Oregon Newspaper Publishers Association until 2000. Scott and Miriam Swanson bought the paper from the Pauls in 2005. Alex Paul went on to serve on the Linn-Benton Community College Foundation Board, and to work as a journalist at the Albany Democrat-Herald. In July 2023, the newspaper was sold to Chris Chapman. In December 2024, the paper announced it was "quite honestly, short on staff, and close to collapse financially." Scott and Miriam Swanson returned as owners and a call was made to the community to subscribe, buy advertisements and donate to the New Era.
