= Oregon Route 228 =

State highway in Linn County, Oregon, US

Oregon Route 228
- Route 228 highlighted in red

Route information
- Maintained by ODOT
- Length: 21.40 mi (34.44 km)

Major junctions
- West end: OR 99E in Halsey
- I-5 near Halsey
- East end: US 20 in Sweet Home

Location
- Country: United States
- State: Oregon
- County: Linn

Highway system
- Oregon Highways; Interstate; US; State; Named; Scenic
← OR 227	→ OR 229

Oregon Route 228 is an Oregon state highway that runs between the city of Halsey in the Willamette Valley and the city of Sweet Home in the Cascade foothills. The highway is also known as the Halsey-Sweet Home Highway No. 212 (see Oregon highways and routes), and is 21 miles (34 km) long. It lies entirely within Linn County.

== Route description ==
Oregon Route 228 begins at its junction with Oregon Route 99E in Halsey. It heads east from there, crossing Interstate 5 approximately 2 miles (3.2 km) to the east, then passing through the city of Brownsville. The highway continues to the east, ending at an intersection with U.S. Route 20 in Sweet Home.

== Major intersections ==
The entire route is in Linn County.

Location	mi	km	Destinations	Notes
Halsey	0.00	0.00	OR 99E – Harrisburg, Tangent, Junction City, Albany	
	2.40	3.86	I-5 – Albany, Eugene	
Sweet Home	21.40	34.44	US 20 – Foster Lake, Lebanon, Albany, Bend	
1.000 mi = 1.609 km; 1.000 km = 0.621 mi

== Gallery ==
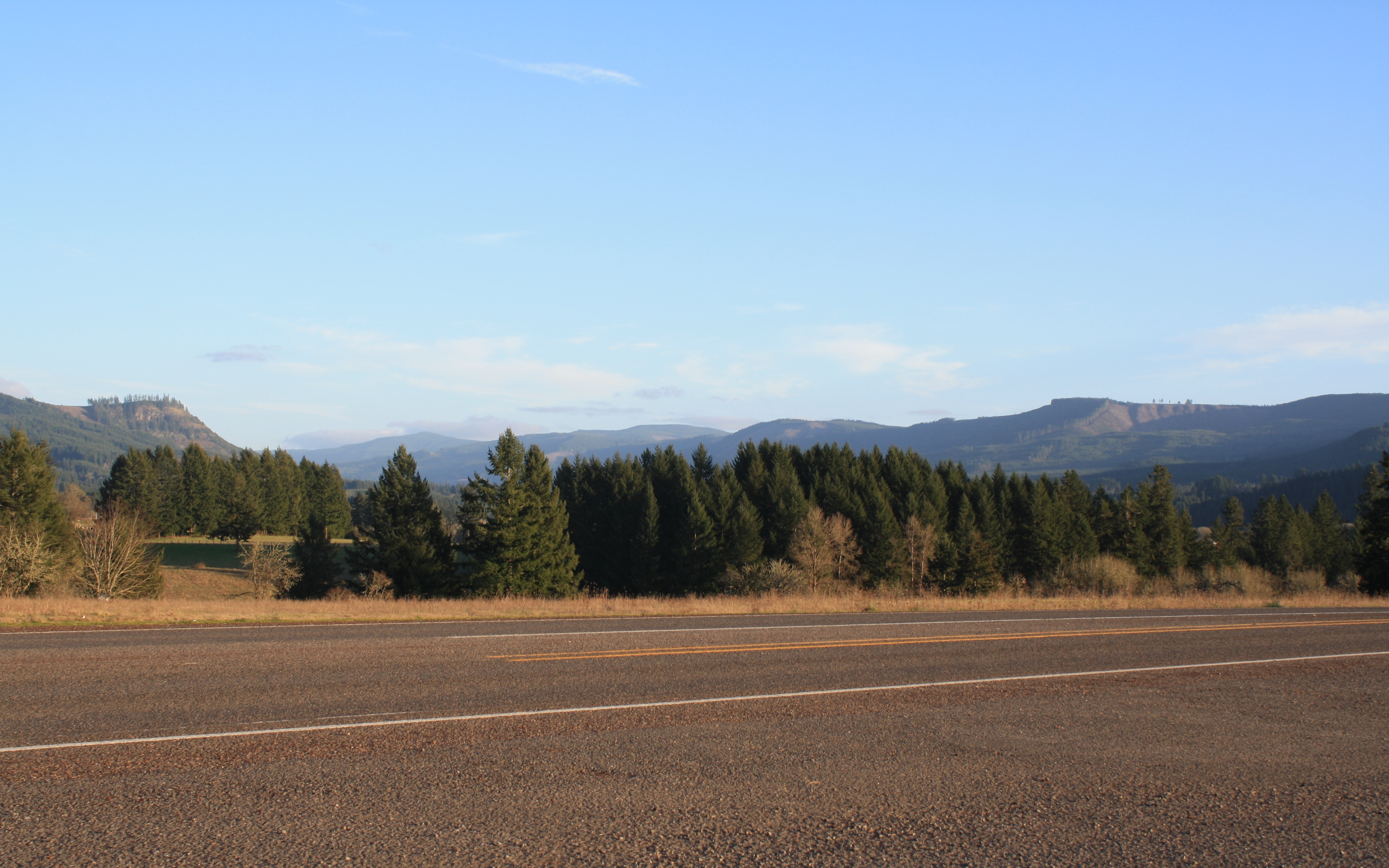
Oregon Route 228 near Holley, Oregon

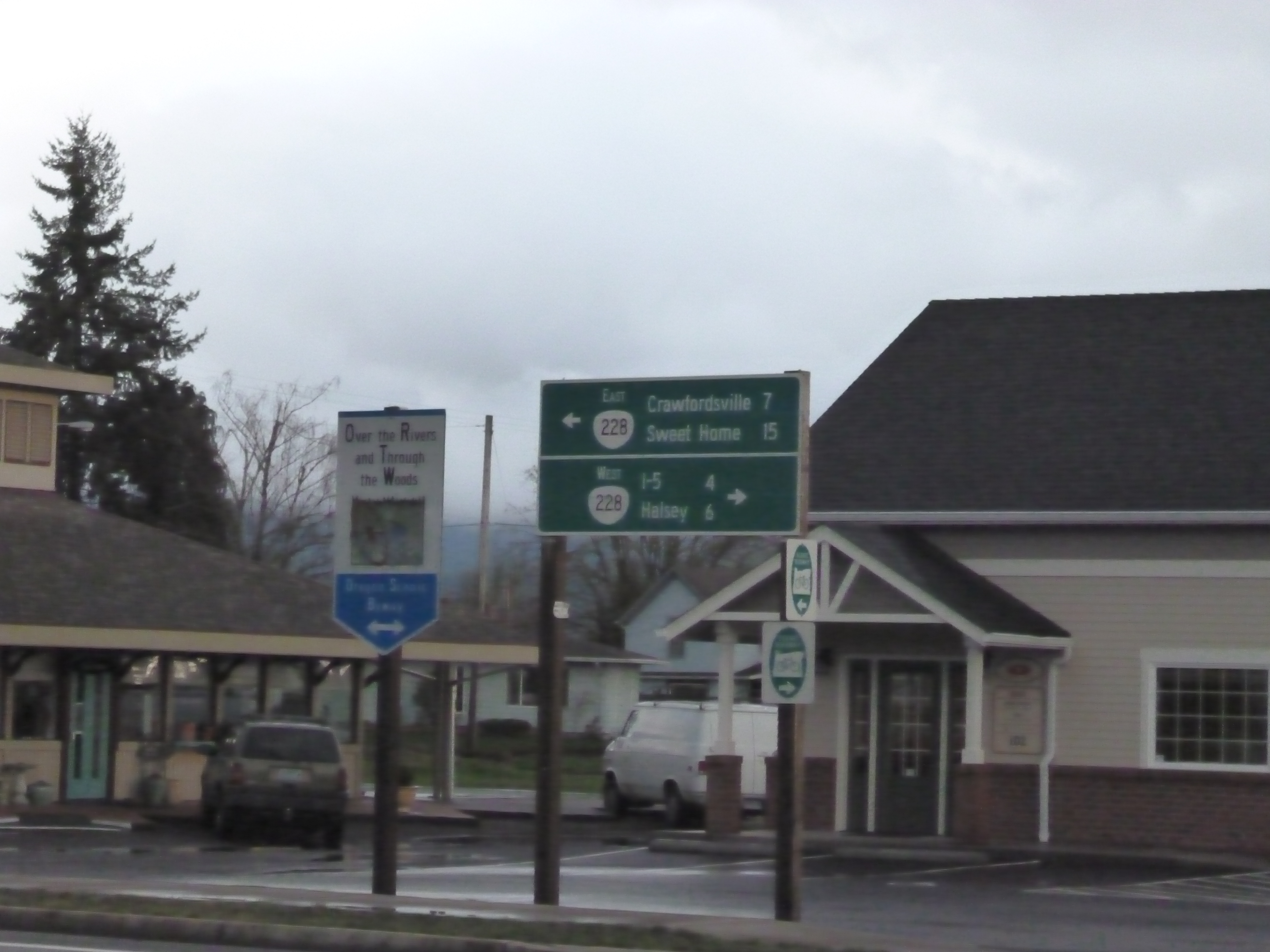
Oregon 228 Directional sign

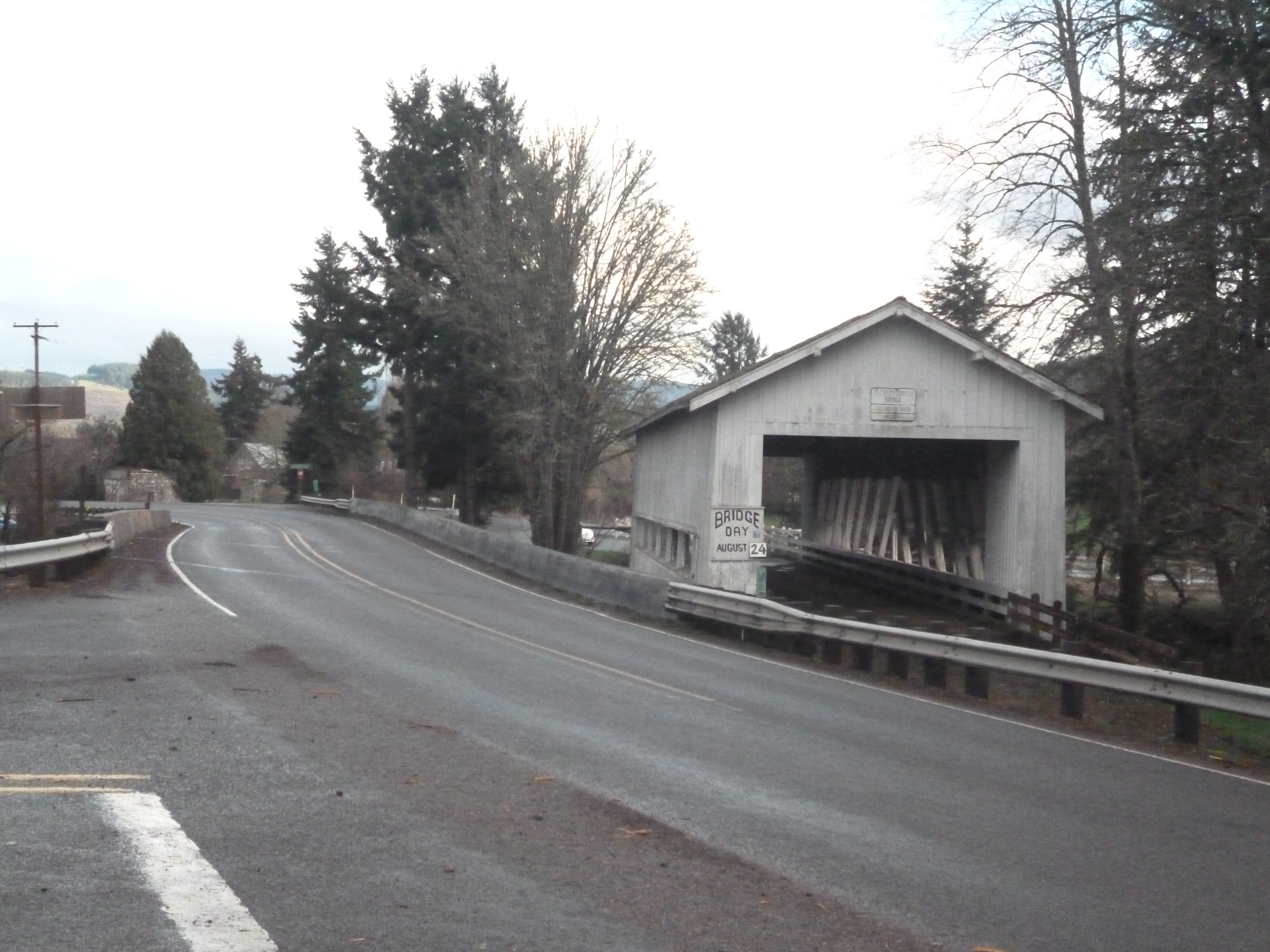
Crawfordsville Covered Bridge along Oregon 228
