= Brownsville, Oregon =

- City
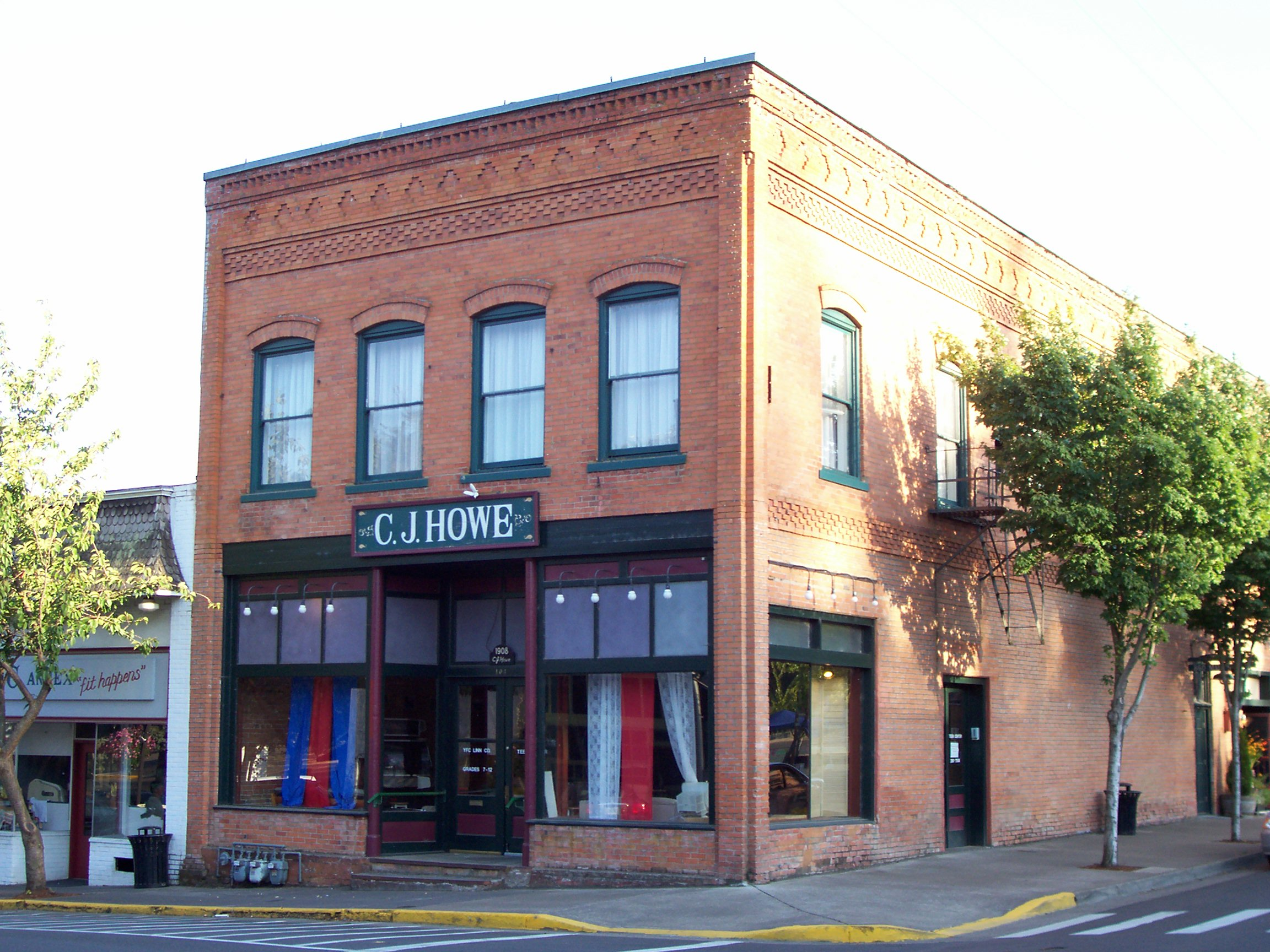
- C. J. Howe Building in downtown

- Location in Oregon
- Coordinates: 44°23′26″N 122°59′21″W
- Country: United States
- State: Oregon
- County: Linn
- Incorporated: 1876

Government
  - Mayor: Adam Craven

Area
  - Total: 1.36 sq mi (3.52 km^{2})
  - Land: 1.36 sq mi (3.52 km^{2})
  - Water: 0 sq mi (0.00 km^{2})
- Elevation: 335 ft (102 m)

Population (2020)
  - Total: 1,694
  - Density: 1,247.6/sq mi (481.71/km^{2})
- U.S. Census
- Time zone: UTC-8 (Pacific)
  - Summer (DST): UTC-7 (Pacific)
- ZIP code: 97327
- Area code: 541
- FIPS code: 41-09050
- GNIS feature ID: 2409923
- Website: www.ci.brownsville.or.us

Brownsville is a city in Linn County, Oregon, United States. As of the 2020 census the population was 1,694.

== History ==
=== Establishment ===
Brownsville was originally known as "Calapooya" after the area's original inhabitants, the Kalapuya Native People, or "Kirk's Ferry", after the ferry operated across the Calapooia River by early settlers Alexander and Sarah Kirk. When Linn County was created from the southern portion of Champoeg County on December 28, 1847, the Provisional Legislature named Calapooia as the county seat. The Spaulding School in Brownsville served as the original county courthouse. Brownsville was named in honor of Hugh L. Brown, who settled there in 1846 and opened the first store.

In 1851, the Territorial Legislature passed an act establishing Albany as the county seat. A special election in 1856 reaffirmed Albany as the county seat.

=== Stand by Me ===
In the mid-1980s, Brownsville assumed a modicum of international renown as the location for the film Stand by Me, directed by Rob Reiner. The film was shot in and around the community in June and July 1985, with theatrical release in August 1986. About 100 local residents were used as extras in the film, and the event was memorialized in 2007 with the first community celebration of Stand by Me Day on July 23 of that year. The date for Stand by Me Day was chosen by local resident and expert on the film Linda McCormick, who recalled in a 2016 interview that the day had been picked as one that did not interfere with other regional events and "wasn't too close to the start of the school year." About 2,000 visitors made the pilgrimage to Brownsville for the 2007 event. The celebration has been held annually since that year, with the exception of 2020, due to the COVID-19 pandemic. The 2016 iteration, honoring the 30th anniversary of the cinematic release, introduced the first "Ray Brower Memorial 5K Walk/Run," named in honor of the dead body around which the film's plot revolved.

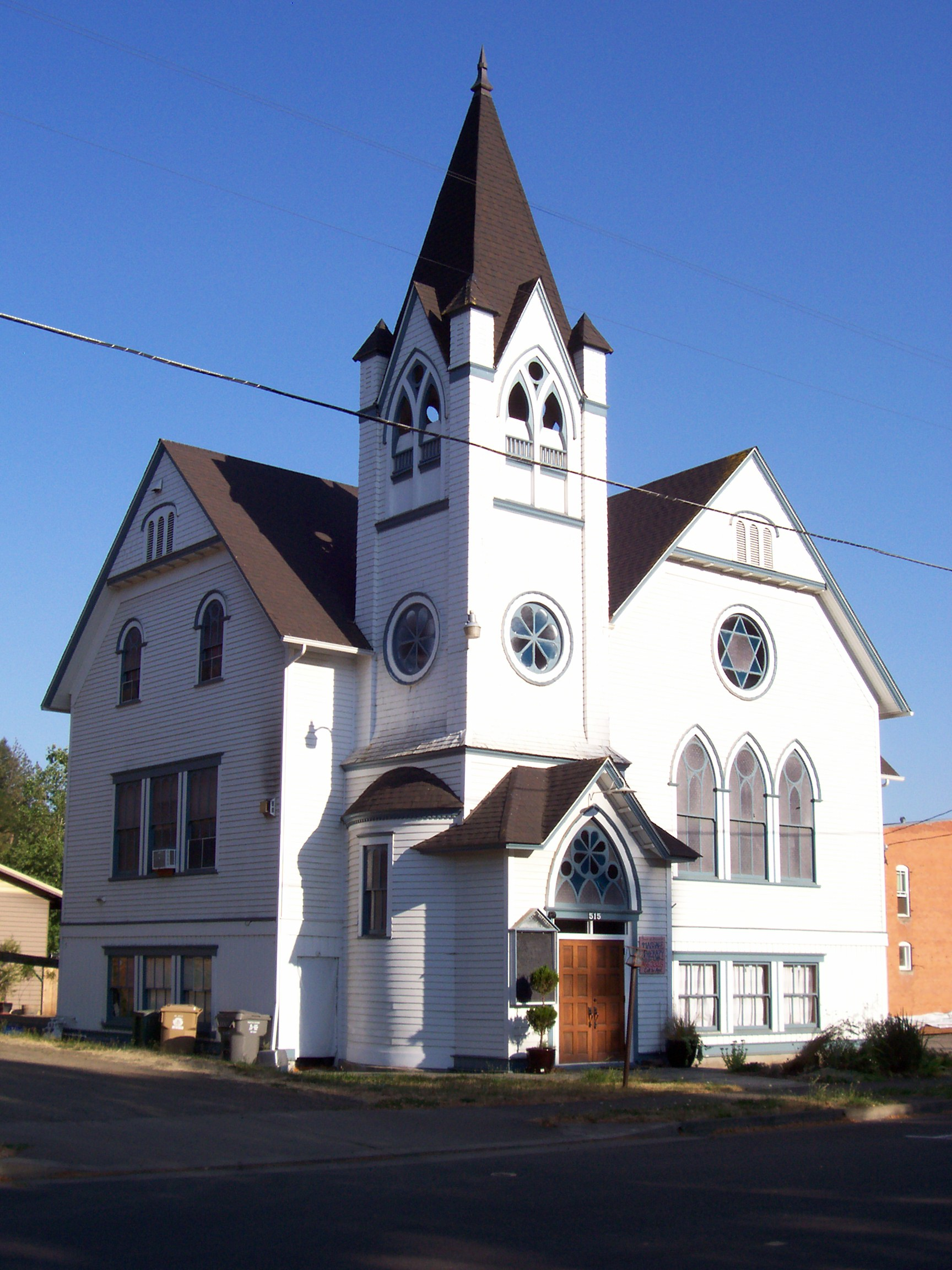
Baptist church in Brownsville

=== Historic Landmarks ===
The downtown area features several structures listed on the National Register of Historic Places, including the C.J. Howe Building. Built in 1908, the building originally served as a grocery and mercantile store. Another prominent landmark is the First Baptist Church of Brownsville building. Constructed in the mid-19th century, it housed one of the earliest pioneer congregations in the Oregon Territory.

== Geography ==
According to the United States Census Bureau, the city has a total area of 1.34 square miles (3.47 km^{2}), all land.

== Demographics ==
Historical population
Census	Pop.	Note	%±
1880	143		—
1890	580		305.6%
1900	698		20.3%
1910	919		31.7%
1920	763		−17.0%
1930	746		−2.2%
1940	784		5.1%
1950	1,175		49.9%
1960	875		−25.5%
1970	1,034		18.2%
1980	1,261		22.0%
1990	1,281		1.6%
2000	1,449		13.1%
2010	1,668		15.1%
2020	1,694		1.6%
U.S. Decennial Census

=== 2020 census ===
As of the 2020 census, Brownsville had a population of 1,694. The median age was 44.5 years. 20.1% of residents were under the age of 18 and 21.4% of residents were 65 years of age or older. For every 100 females there were 95.2 males, and for every 100 females age 18 and over there were 94.4 males age 18 and over.

0% of residents lived in urban areas, while 100.0% lived in rural areas.

There were 681 households in Brownsville, of which 30.1% had children under the age of 18 living in them. Of all households, 53.5% were married-couple households, 15.4% were households with a male householder and no spouse or partner present, and 23.5% were households with a female householder and no spouse or partner present. About 24.0% of all households were made up of individuals and 13.0% had someone living alone who was 65 years of age or older.

There were 716 housing units, of which 4.9% were vacant. Among occupied housing units, 79.4% were owner-occupied and 20.6% were renter-occupied. The homeowner vacancy rate was 1.6% and the rental vacancy rate was 4.1%.

Racial composition as of the 2020 census
Race	Number	Percent
White	1,499	88.5%
Black or African American	13	0.8%
American Indian and Alaska Native	15	0.9%
Asian	27	1.6%
Native Hawaiian and Other Pacific Islander	0	0%
Some other race	32	1.9%
Two or more races	108	6.4%
Hispanic or Latino (of any race)	59	3.5%

=== 2010 census ===
As of the census of 2010, there were 1,668 people, 639 households, and 461 families living in the city. The population density was 1,244.8 inhabitants per square mile (480.6/km^{2}). There were 685 housing units at an average density of 511.2 per square mile (197.4/km^{2}). The racial makeup of the city was 93.8% White, 0.3% African American, 1.2% Native American, 0.5% Asian, 0.8% from other races, and 3.3% from two or more races. Hispanic or Latino of any race were 4.1% of the population.

There were 639 households, of which 33.6% had children under the age of 18 living with them, 55.7% were married couples living together, 11.6% had a female householder with no husband present, 4.9% had a male householder with no wife present, and 27.9% were non-families. 20.2% of all households were made up of individuals, and 7.4% had someone living alone who was 65 years of age or older. The average household size was 2.61 and the average family size was 3.02.

The median age in the city was 39.6 years. 25.2% of residents were under the age of 18; 7.3% were between the ages of 18 and 24; 24.8% were from 25 to 44; 29.3% were from 45 to 64; and 13.4% were 65 years of age or older. The gender makeup of the city was 47.6% male and 52.4% female.

=== 2000 census ===
As of the census of 2000, there were 1,449 people, 535 households, and 411 families living in the city. The population density was 1,116.2 inhabitants per square mile (431.0/km^{2}). There were 579 housing units at an average density of 446.0 per square mile (172.2/km^{2}). The racial makeup of the city was 93.65% White, 0.35% African American, 1.66% Native American, 0.14% Asian, 0.55% from other races, and 3.66% from two or more races. Hispanic or Latino of any race were 2.07% of the population.

There were 535 households, out of which 35.5% had children under the age of 18 living with them, 60.4% were married couples living together, 10.8% had a female householder with no husband present, and 23.0% were non-families. 19.4% of all households were made up of individuals, and 8.8% had someone living alone who was 65 years of age or older. The average household size was 2.71 and the average family size was 3.07.

In the city, the population was spread out, with 27.5% under the age of 18, 7.5% from 18 to 24, 26.4% from 25 to 44, 27.0% from 45 to 64, and 11.6% who were 65 years of age or older. The median age was 37 years. For every 100 females, there were 102.1 males. For every 100 females age 18 and over, there were 98.9 males.

The median income for a household in the city was $35,486, and the median income for a family was $39,671. Males had a median income of $37,400 versus $24,643 for females. The per capita income for the city was $15,272. About 5.6% of families and 8.8% of the population were below the poverty line, including 11.0% of those under age 18 and 7.4% of those age 65 or over.

== See also ==
- The Brownsville Times
