= Calapooia River =

River in Oregon, United States

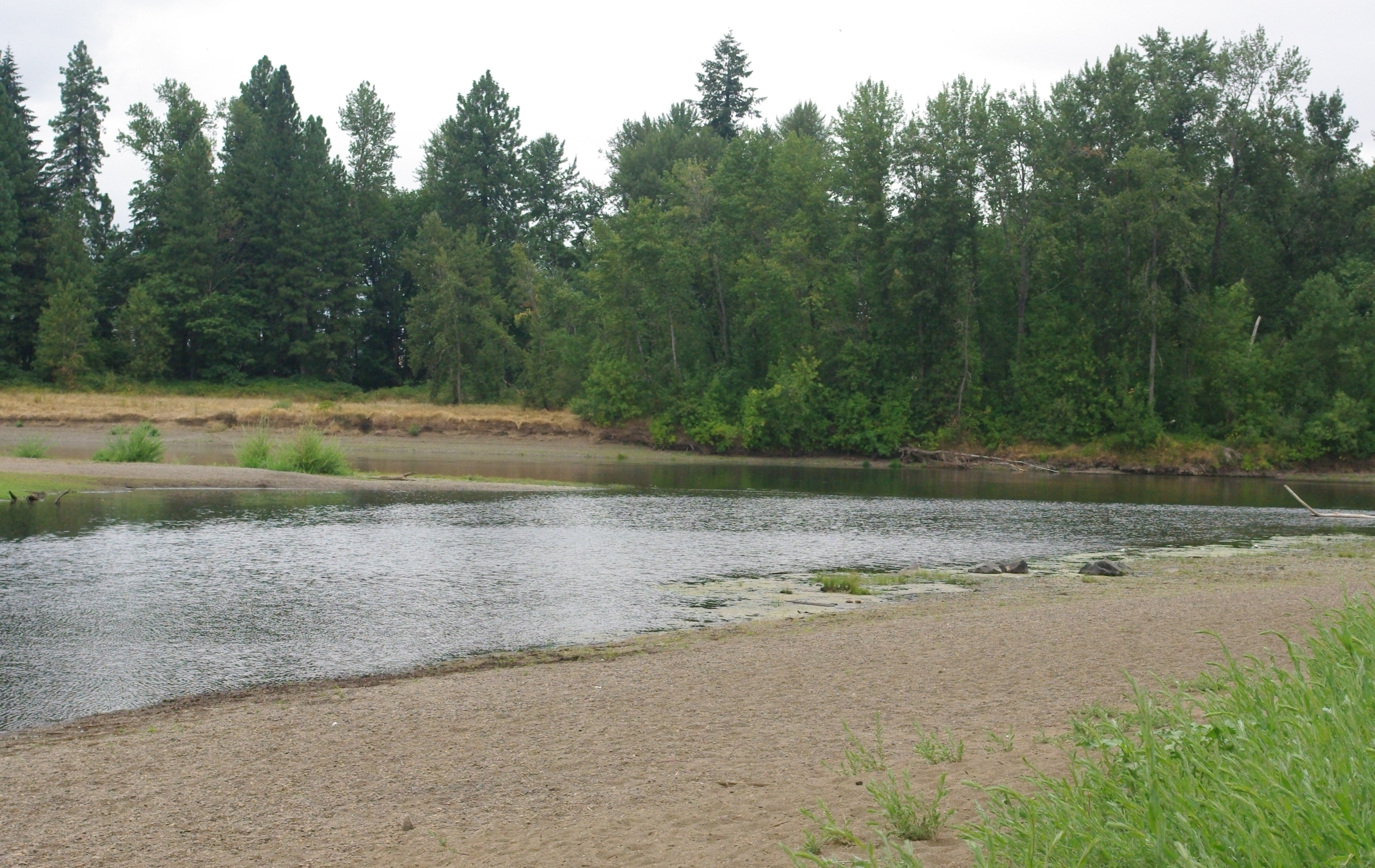
- The Calapooia River at its confluence with the Willamette River, Albany

- Location of the mouth of the Calapooia River in Oregon
- Etymology: For the Kalapuya people of the Willamette Valley

Location
- Country: United States
- State: Oregon
- County: Linn

Physical characteristics
- Source: Cascade Range
  - coordinates: 44°15′54″N 122°19′25″W
  - elevation: 4,552 ft (1,387 m)
- Mouth: Willamette River
  - coordinates: 44°38′20″N 123°6′36″W
  - elevation: 180 ft (55 m)
- Length: 80 mi (130 km)
- Basin size: 374 sq mi (970 km^{2})
- Discharge
  - average: 898 cu ft/s (25.4 m^{3}/s)

The Calapooia River is an 80-mile (130 km) tributary of the Willamette River in the U.S. state of Oregon.

The Calapooia flows generally northwest from its source in the Cascade Range near Tidbits Mountain. In its upper reaches, it passes through parts of the Willamette National Forest. Further downstream, it flows through Holley then Crawfordsville and Brownsville in the Willamette Valley before joining the Willamette at Albany. The city of Tangent is also near the river on a branch of one of its downstream tributaries, Lake Creek. The confluence of the two rivers is about 120 miles (190 km) by water from where the Willamette joins the Columbia River

The Calapooia was named for the Kalapuya (also spelled Calapooia), a tribe of Native Americans.

== Tributaries ==
Named tributaries of the river from source to mouth are Eighteen, Treadwell, and United States creeks followed by the North Fork Calapooia River. Then come King, Potts, Barrett/Hands, Washout, McKinley and Blue creeks. Further downstream are Biggs, Fox, Sweet Honey, Cedar, Pugh, Sawyer, Johnson, and Brush creeks. Finally come Warren, Cochrane, Courtney, Lake, and Oak creeks.

== Dams ==
The Brownsville Dam was built in the late 1800s, later rebuilt as a small concrete dam. It was removed in 2007 to allow better fish passage and address safety concerns.

The small Sodom Dam and Shearer Dam were both removed in 2011, leaving the Calapooia River free of any human-made dams.

== See also ==
- List of rivers of Oregon
- List of longest streams of Oregon
