= Holley, Oregon =

Unincorporated community in the state of Oregon, United States

- Census-designated place
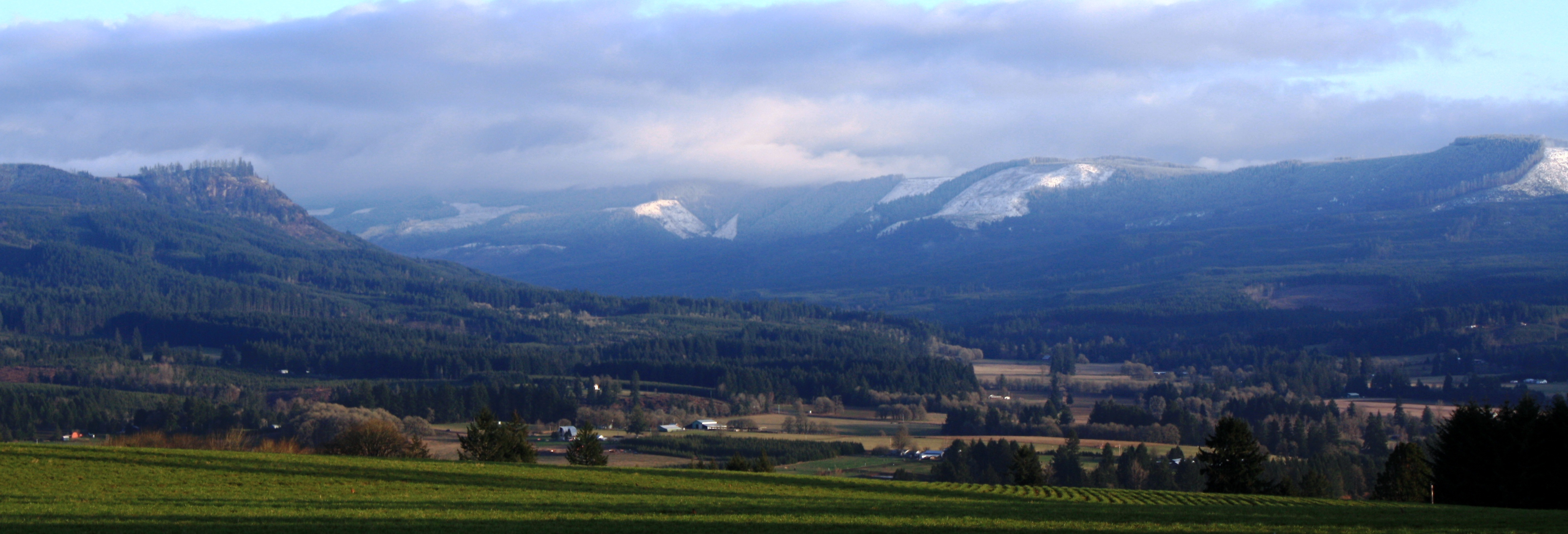
- Holley and the surrounding upper Calapooia River valley

- Location within Oregon Location within the United States
- Coordinates: 44°20′56″N 122°47′08″W
- Country: United States
- State: Oregon
- County: Linn

Area
  - Total: 2.82 sq mi (7.30 km^{2})
  - Land: 2.82 sq mi (7.30 km^{2})
  - Water: 0 sq mi (0.00 km^{2})
- Elevation: 610 ft (190 m)

Population (2020)
  - Total: 390
  - Density: 138/sq mi (53.4/km^{2})
- Time zone: UTC-8 (Pacific (PST))
  - Summer (DST): UTC-7 (PDT)
- ZIP code: 97386
- Area codes: 458 and 541
- FIPS code: 41-34650
- GNIS feature ID: 2584416

Holley is a census-designated place and unincorporated community in Linn County, Oregon, United States. As of the 2020 census, Holley had a population of 390. It is about 4 miles (6 km) southwest of Sweet Home on Oregon Route 228 near the Calapooia River.

The Holley area was once the source of the semi-precious gemstone Holley blue agate.

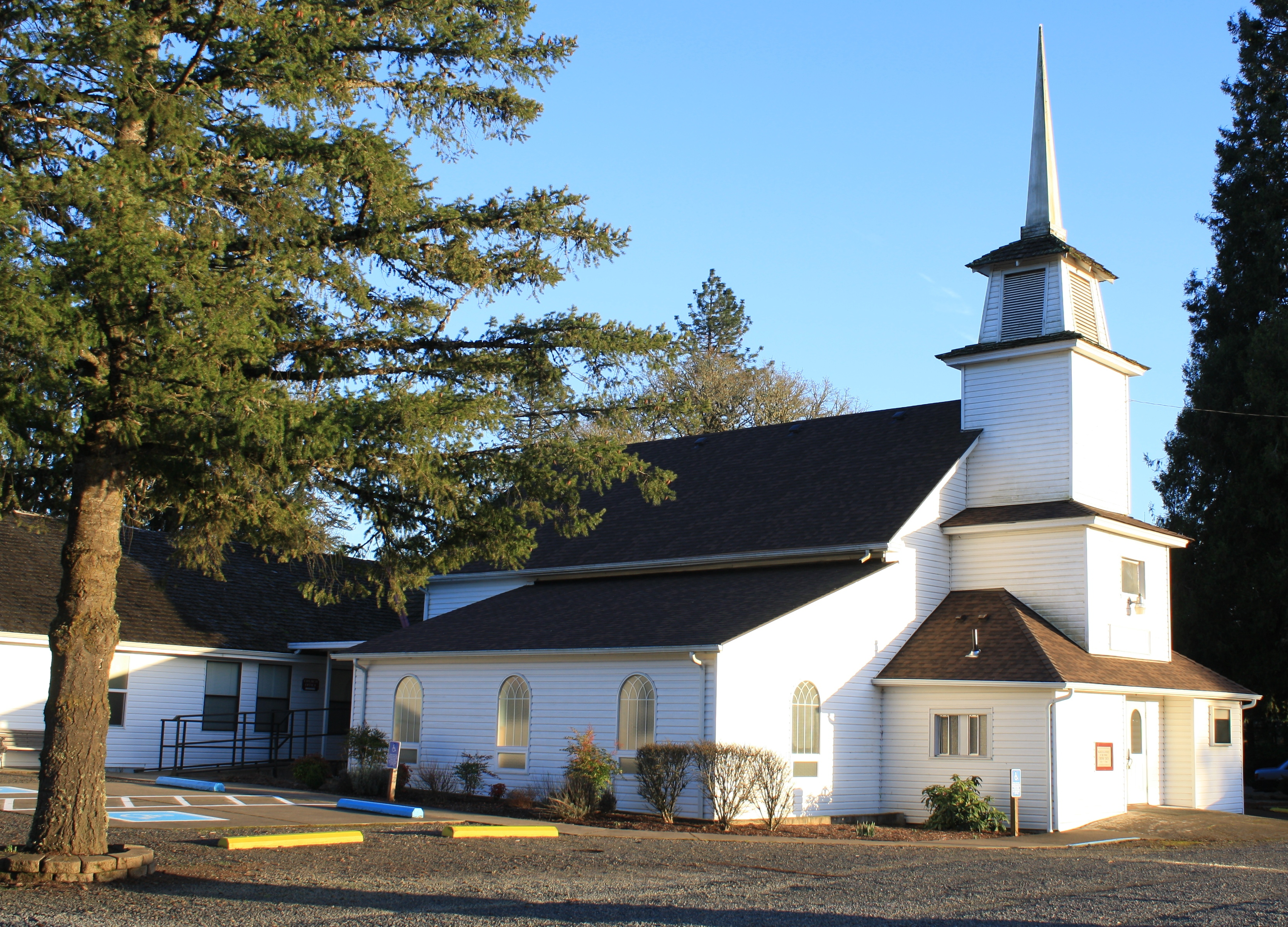
Holley Christian Church

== Demographics ==
Historical population
Census	Pop.	Note	%±
2020	390		—
U.S. Decennial Census
