= Sweet Home High School (Oregon) =

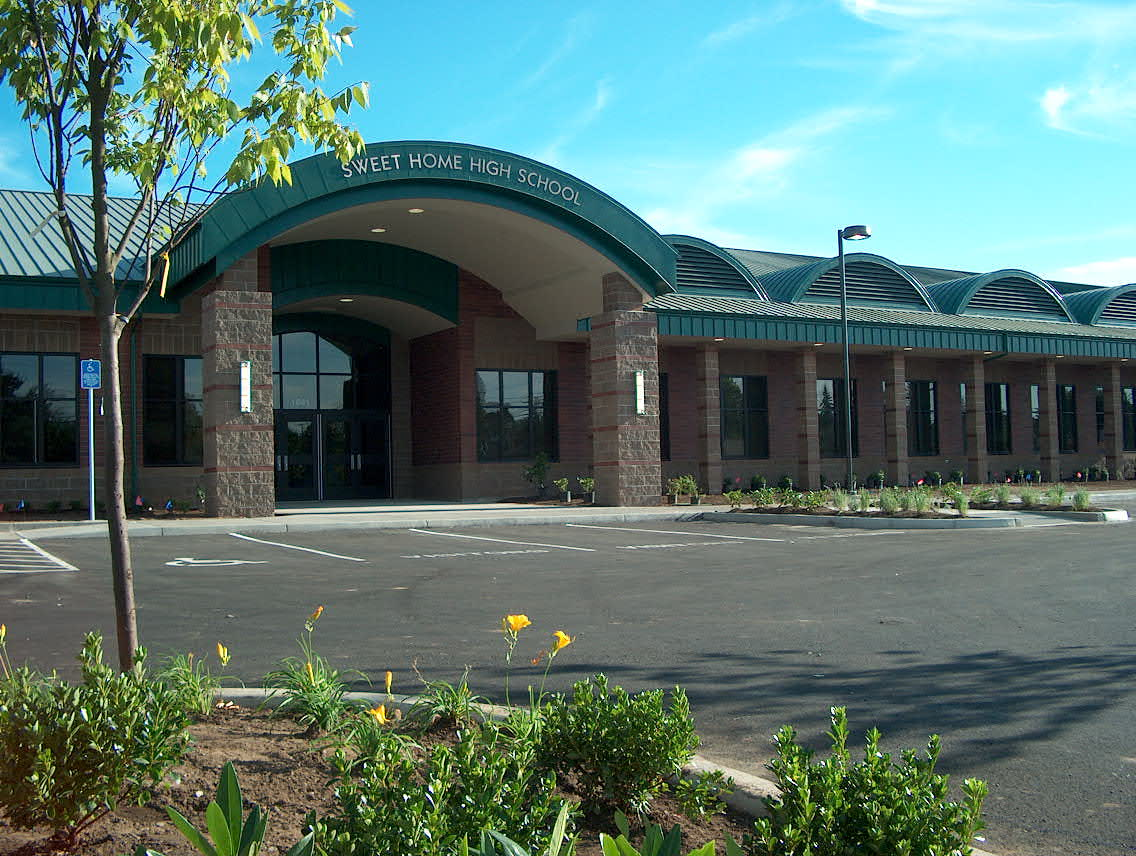

Location
- 1641 Long Street; Sweet Home, Oregon 97386; United States; 44.396731°N 122.725106°W

Information
- Type: Public
- School district: Sweet Home School District
- Principal: Ralph Brown (2024)
- Teaching staff: 40.75 (FTE)
- Grades: 9-12
- Enrollment: 752 (2024–2025)
- Student to teacher ratio: 18.45
- Colors: Green and Gold
- Athletics conference: OSAA 3A-5 Mountain Valley Conference
- Mascot: Husky
- Website: shsd55or.gov/high-school/

Sweet Home High School is a public high school located in Sweet Home, Oregon. The high school serves the much of southeastern Linn County, including the communities of Foster, Cascadia, and Holley.

== Academics ==
75% of Sweet Home High School students in the class of 2010 earned their diplomas on time compared to a statewide average of 66% of students. The school received an Outstanding rating on its 2010 State report card.

In the 2023–2024 academic year, Sweet Home High School had a median class size of 21 students, below the state average of 22.5. About 56% of students attended at least 90% of their enrolled school days, compared to the state average of 66%. Despite lower attendance, 92% of freshmen were on track to graduate, above the state average of 85%. The school reported a four-year graduation rate of 78%, just below the statewide rate of 81%. Additionally, 36% of graduates enrolled in a two- or four-year college within 12 months of graduation, well below the state average of 53%.

== Athletics ==
Sweet Home competes in the OSAA 4A-3 Oregon West Conference. The school's athletic director is Dan Tow and the athletics secretary is Andee McCubbins.

=== State championships ===
- Boys' Basketball: 1993
- Boys' Swimming: 2000, 2009, 2010, 2017
- Boys' Track and Field: 2008, 2009, 2010
- Cheerleading: 2007, 2008, 2012, 2013, 2016, 2026
- Girls' Swimming: 2016, 2017, 2019, 2022
- Girls' Track and Field: 1983
- Football: 1987
- Softball: 1988
- Wrestling: 1958, 1960, 1976, 1998, 1999, 2007, 2009, 2017, 2024, 2026
