= National Register of Historic Places listings in Linn County, Oregon =

Location of Linn County in Oregon

This list presents the full set of buildings, structures, objects, sites, or districts designated on the National Register of Historic Places in Linn County, Oregon, United States, and offers brief descriptive information about each of them. The National Register recognizes places of national, state, or local historic significance across the United States. Out of over 90,000 National Register sites nationwide, Oregon is home to over 2,000, and 76 of those are found partially or wholly in Linn County.

This National Park Service list is complete through NPS recent listings posted October 9, 2026.

== Current listings ==
	Name on the Register	Image	Date listed	Location	City or town	Description
1	David and Maggie Aegerter Barn	David and Maggie Aegerter Barn	July 15, 1999 (#99000780)	41915 Ridge Dr. 44°44′54″N 122°44′37″W	Scio	
2	Albany Custom Mill	Albany Custom Mill	February 12, 1980 (#80003338)	213 Water St. 44°38′18″N 123°06′23″W	Albany	
3	Albany Downtown Commercial Historic District	Albany Downtown Commercial Historic District	December 9, 1982 (#82001509)	Roughly bounded by the Willamette River and Montgomery, Washington, and 5th Sts. 44°38′12″N 123°06′22″W	Albany	
4	Albany Hebrew Cemetery	Albany Hebrew Cemetery	May 18, 2015 (#15000240)	3165 Salem Avenue SE; 44°38′33″N 123°04′06″W	Albany	
5	Albany Monteith Historic District	Albany Monteith Historic District	February 29, 1980 (#80003341)	Roughly bounded by 2nd, Lyon, 12th and Elm Sts.; also Elm St. southwest to Calapooia and 19th Ave., SW. to 11th and 12th Aves., SW. 44°37′55″N 123°06′31″W	Albany	Second set of boundaries represents a boundary increase of November 13, 2008
6	Albany Municipal Airport	Albany Municipal Airport	June 3, 1998 (#98000630)	3510 Knox Butte Rd. 44°38′24″N 123°03′29″W	Albany	
7	Jerry Andrus House	Jerry Andrus House	October 25, 2011 (#11000769)	1638 1st Ave. E. 44°38′22″N 123°05′06″W	Albany	
8	Steven and Elizabeth Archibald Farmstead	Steven and Elizabeth Archibald Farmstead	September 22, 2004 (#04001068)	31888 Wirth Rd. 44°30′47″N 123°04′46″W	Tangent	Original house is gone.
9	Granville H. Baber House	Granville H. Baber House	October 29, 1975 (#75001588)	Northeast of Albany off U.S. 99; 44°40′43″N 123°01′18″W	Albany	
10	Hiram Baker House	Hiram Baker House	June 3, 1996 (#96000621)	515 E. Grant St. 44°32′18″N 122°53′53″W	Lebanon	
11	Dr. J. C. Booth House	Dr. J. C. Booth House	April 1, 1980 (#80003344)	486 Park St. 44°32′29″N 122°54′17″W	Lebanon	
12	Boston Flour Mill	Boston Flour Mill	August 21, 1979 (#79002117)	E of Shedd on Boston Mill Rd. 44°27′41″N 123°04′47″W	Shedd	
13	Hugh Leeper Brown Barn	Hugh Leeper Brown Barn	November 15, 1979 (#79002112)	SE of Brownsville on OR 228; 44°22′52″N 122°57′28″W	Brownsville	
14	John and Amelia Brown Farmhouse	John and Amelia Brown Farmhouse	November 22, 1978 (#78003408)	SE of Brownsville on OR 228; 44°22′56″N 122°57′53″W	Brownsville	
15	Cascadia Cave	Cascadia Cave	October 25, 1990 (#90001589)	Address restricted	Cascadia	
16	George Earle Chamberlain House	George Earle Chamberlain House	February 22, 1980 (#80003339)	208 SE 7th Ave. 44°37′58″N 123°06′08″W	Albany	
17	Matthew C. Chambers Barn	Matthew C. Chambers Barn	September 27, 1996 (#96001044)	.4 mi. N of jct. of Knox Butte Rd. and Scravel Hill Rd. 44°39′11″N 123°01′23″W	Albany	Photo is not the barn pictured in the NRHP nomination form.
18	William Cochran Barn	William Cochran Barn	July 8, 1999 (#99000782)	28485 Brownsville Rd. 44°25′18″N 122°59′13″W	Brownsville	
19	George C. Cooley House	George C. Cooley House	May 9, 1983 (#83002160)	220 Blakely Ave. 44°23′06″N 122°58′53″W	Brownsville	
20	Crabtree Creek-Hoffman Covered Bridge	Crabtree Creek-Hoffman Covered Bridge	February 17, 1987 (#87000017)	Hungry Hill Dr., 1.8 mi. N of Crabtree; 44°39′12″N 122°53′25″W	Crabtree	
21	Louis A. Crandall House	Louis A. Crandall House	October 25, 1990 (#90001588)	959 Main St. 44°32′13″N 122°54′20″W	Lebanon	
22	Crawfordsville Bridge	Crawfordsville Bridge	November 29, 1979 (#79002115)	SR 228; 44°21′28″N 122°51′32″W	Crawfordsville	
23	Cumberland Presbyterian Church	Cumberland Presbyterian Church	May 20, 2024 (#100010391)	1400 Santiam Road SE; 44°38′09″N 123°05′17″W	Albany	
24	Henry and Mary Cyrus Barn	Henry and Mary Cyrus Barn	November 9, 2015 (#15000778)	37964 Balm Dr. 44°37′27″N 122°53′06″W	Lebanon	
25	Alfred Dawson House	Alfred Dawson House	February 12, 1980 (#80003340)	731 SW Broadalbin St. 44°38′28″N 123°06′18″W	Albany	
26	Elkins Flour Mill	Elkins Flour Mill	June 9, 1995 (#95000689)	Bounded by US 20, Industrial Way, the Santiam-Albany Canal and the Callaghan RR tracks 44°32′52″N 122°54′19″W	Lebanon	
27	Hugh Fields House	Hugh Fields House	July 19, 1989 (#89000853)	36176 OR 228; 44°22′51″N 122°56′29″W	Brownsville	
28	First Baptist Church of Brownsville	First Baptist Church of Brownsville	June 19, 1991 (#91000807)	515 N. Main St. 44°23′44″N 122°59′01″W	Brownsville	
29	First Evangelical Church of Albany	First Evangelical Church of Albany	August 1, 1984 (#84003030)	1120 SW. 12th Ave. 44°37′38″N 123°06′52″W	Albany	
30	Fish Lake Guard Station	Fish Lake Guard Station	June 27, 2014 (#14000381)	57600 McKenzie Highway; 44°24′12″N 122°00′22″W	McKenzie Bridge vicinity	
31	Flinn Block	Flinn Block	March 2, 1979 (#79002109)	222 SW. 1st Ave. 44°38′13″N 123°06′21″W	Albany	
32	Hackleman Historic District	Hackleman Historic District	March 15, 1982 (#82003735)	Roughly bounded by Pacific Boulevard and Lyons, 2nd and Madison Sts. 44°38′06″N 123°05′54″W	Albany	
33	Hannah Bridge	Hannah Bridge	November 29, 1979 (#79002116)	Burmester Creek Rd. 44°42′44″N 122°43′04″W	Scio	
34	Harrisburg Odd Fellows Hall	Harrisburg Odd Fellows Hall	October 15, 1992 (#92001382)	190 Smith St. 44°16′20″N 123°10′12″W	Harrisburg	
35	George Hochstedler House	George Hochstedler House	October 10, 1980 (#80004549)	237 SE 6th Ave. 44°38′02″N 123°06′02″W	Albany	
36	C. J. Howe Building	C. J. Howe Building	April 1, 1980 (#80003343)	104 Spaulding Ave. 44°23′38″N 122°59′00″W	Brownsville	
37	Independence Prairie Ranger Station	Independence Prairie Ranger Station	March 29, 1983 (#83002161)	Willamette National Forest; 44°37′02″N 121°56′22″W	Marion Forks	
38	Larwood Bridge	Larwood Bridge	November 29, 1979 (#79003733)	E of Crabtree; 44°37′48″N 122°44′21″W	Crabtree	
39	Lebanon Pioneer Cemetery	Lebanon Pioneer Cemetery	March 5, 1998 (#98000208)	200 Dodge St. 44°32′40″N 122°54′14″W	Lebanon	
40	Lebanon Southern Pacific Railroad Depot	Lebanon Southern Pacific Railroad Depot	June 13, 1997 (#97000584)	735 Third St. 44°32′20″N 122°54′36″W	Lebanon	
41	Hector and Margaret Macpherson Barn	Hector and Margaret Macpherson Barn	July 8, 1999 (#99000781)	29780 Church Dr. 44°30′42″N 123°11′32″W	Albany	
42	Marion Forks Guard Station	Marion Forks Guard Station	March 6, 1991 (#91000167)	OR 22, Willamette NF; 44°36′51″N 121°56′56″W	Marion Forks	
43	Joseph and Barbara Maurer House	Joseph and Barbara Maurer House	September 27, 1996 (#96001045)	35168 Tennessee Rd. 44°36′14″N 122°55′21″W	Lebanon	
44	McKenzie Highway Historic District	McKenzie Highway Historic District	February 7, 2011 (#10001215)	OR 242; 44°14′55″N 121°50′18″W	Sisters to Belknap Springs	Extends into Deschutes and Lane counties.
45	Methodist Episcopal Church South	Methodist Episcopal Church South	November 16, 1979 (#79002110)	238 E. 3rd St; 44°38′10″N 123°06′04″W	Albany	
46	Gottlieb and Della Milde Barn	Gottlieb and Della Milde Barn	July 15, 1999 (#99000785)	36898 Northern Dr. 44°22′34″N 122°54′55″W	Brownsville	
47	Mill City Southern Pacific Rail Road (SPRR) Bridge	Mill City Southern Pacific Rail Road (SPRR) Bridge	June 22, 2021 (#100006686)	Spanning the North Santiam River; 44°45′19″N 122°28′40″W	Mill City	
48	Thomas and Walter Monteith House	Thomas and Walter Monteith House	May 21, 1975 (#75001586)	518 W. 2nd Ave. 44°38′10″N 123°06′33″W	Albany	
49	John and Mary Moore House	John and Mary Moore House	October 1, 2001 (#01001066)	320 Kirk Ave. 44°23′33″N 122°58′49″W	Brownsville	
50	John M. Moyer House	John M. Moyer House	January 21, 1974 (#74001693)	204 Main St. 44°23′35″N 122°59′03″W	Brownsville	
51	Mt. Pleasant Presbyterian Church	Mt. Pleasant Presbyterian Church	January 24, 1974 (#74001694)	S of Stayton on Kingston-Jordan Rd. 44°45′31″N 122°44′38″W	Stayton	
52	Oregon Pacific Railroad Linear Historic District	Oregon Pacific Railroad Linear Historic District	October 29, 1999 (#99001285)	Roughly a 20-mile linear section of the old railroad grade between Idanha and the Cascade Range summit (See also Marion and Jefferson counties.); 44°27′10″N 121°53′57″W	Idanha to the Cascade Range summit via Santiam Junction	Beginning in 1872, the colorful Thomas Egenton Hogg set out to build a transcontinental railroad terminating in the Oregon Coast. By the time of his venture's final bankruptcy in 1894, completed track reached only from Yaquina Bay to Idanha in the Cascade foothills, with grade work under way east of Idanha to the summit. The historic district protects the remaining signs of the grade work east of Idanha, as well as the sites of two construction camps. Abandoned part way through construction, these remnants provide a unique window onto construction methods and living conditions in 19th century railroad camps.
53	Moses Parker House	Moses Parker House	August 25, 1980 (#80003342)	638 SE 5th St. 44°38′09″N 123°05′45″W	Albany	
54	E. C. Peery Building	E. C. Peery Building	May 29, 1998 (#98000604)	38731 N. Main St. 44°42′18″N 122°50′50″W	Scio	
55	Porter-Brasfield House	Porter-Brasfield House	November 25, 1980 (#80003345)	31838 Fayetteville Dr. 44°27′41″N 123°06′36″W	Shedd	
56	John and Lottie Ralston Cottage	John and Lottie Ralston Cottage	March 5, 1998 (#98000203)	481 Main St. 44°32′29″N 122°54′20″W	Lebanon	
57	John Ralston House	John Ralston House	December 9, 1981 (#81000501)	632 SE Baker St. 44°37′59″N 123°06′06″W	Albany	
58	Riverside Community Hall	Riverside Community Hall	February 14, 2023 (#100008640)	35293 Riverside Dr. SW; 44°36′00″N 123°09′38″W	Albany	
59	Rock Hill School	Rock Hill School	June 4, 1992 (#92000661)	Rock Hill Dr., 2.2 mi. E of Sand Ridge Rd. 44°28′59″N 122°56′50″W	Lebanon vicinity	
60	Ross-Averill House	Ross-Averill House	February 20, 1991 (#91000061)	420 Averill St. 44°23′41″N 122°59′04″W	Brownsville	Photo does not match the pictures in the NRHP nomination form.
61	Michael and Mary Ryan Barn	Michael and Mary Ryan Barn	July 15, 1999 (#99000784)	40363 Huntley Rd. 44°45′07″N 122°44′26″W	Scio	
62	Santiam Pass Ski Lodge	Santiam Pass Ski Lodge	October 18, 2018 (#100003033)	64405 U.S. 20, Willamette National Forest; 44°25′19″N 121°51′55″W	Sisters vicinity	
63	Santiam Wagon Road	Santiam Wagon Road	September 23, 2010 (#10000795)	Willamette National Forest and Deschutes National Forest; 44°25′29″N 121°50′44″W	Cascadia and Sisters vicinity	Extends into Deschutes County.
64	Short Bridge	Short Bridge	November 29, 1979 (#79002113)	High Deck Rd. 44°23′30″N 122°30′31″W	Cascadia	
65	James Alexander and Elmarion Smith Barn and Lame-Smith House	James Alexander and Elmarion Smith Barn and Lame-Smith House	July 15, 1999 (#99000783)	28020 Powerline Rd. 44°24′18″N 123°07′06″W	Halsey	
66	Starr and Blakely Drug Store	Starr and Blakely Drug Store	October 29, 1982 (#82001510)	421 N. Main St. 44°23′40″N 122°59′01″W	Brownsville	
67	Gus and Emma Stellmacher Farmstead	Gus and Emma Stellmacher Farmstead	August 28, 1998 (#98001123)	32404 Tangent Loop; 44°31′29″N 123°05′36″W	Tangent	
68	Thomas Creek-Gilkey Covered Bridge	Thomas Creek-Gilkey Covered Bridge	February 19, 1987 (#87000016)	Goar Rd., 3 mi. N of Crabtree; 44°41′17″N 122°54′08″W	Crabtree	
69	Thomas Creek-Shimanek Covered Bridge	Thomas Creek-Shimanek Covered Bridge	February 19, 1987 (#87000013)	Richardson Gap Rd., 2 mi. E of Scio; 44°42′57″N 122°48′16″W	Scio	
70	United Presbyterian Church and Rectory	United Presbyterian Church and Rectory	April 18, 1979 (#79002111)	510 SW 5th Ave. 44°38′05″N 123°06′27″W	Albany	
71	United Presbyterian Church of Shedd	United Presbyterian Church of Shedd	March 5, 1998 (#98000209)	30045 OR 99 E 44°27′38″N 123°06′31″W	Shedd	
72	Joseph Wesely House and Barn	Joseph Wesely House and Barn	October 23, 1986 (#86002903)	38791 Highway 226; 44°41′51″N 122°50′57″W	Scio	
73	Wigle Cemetery	Wigle Cemetery	September 22, 2004 (#04001067)	Belts Dr. 44°18′17″N 123°01′00″W	Harrisburg	
74	Abraham and Mary Wigle House	Abraham and Mary Wigle House	May 1, 2003 (#03000345)	34050 Belts Dr. 44°18′05″N 123°01′26″W	Harrisburg	
75	Jacob and Maranda K. Wigle Farmstead	Jacob and Maranda K. Wigle Farmstead	March 5, 1992 (#92000131)	1119 Kirk Ave. 44°23′35″N 122°57′59″W	Brownsville	
76	Z.C.B.J. Tolstoj Lodge No. 224	Z.C.B.J. Tolstoj Lodge No. 224	September 14, 1995 (#95001098)	37091 Richardson Gap Rd. 44°39′37″N 122°48′10″W	Scio	

== Former listings ==
	Name on the Register	Image	Date listed	Date removed	Location	City or town	Description
1	Angell–Brewster House	Angell–Brewster House	October 8, 1992 (#92001330)	April 20, 2011	34191 Brewster Rd. 44°34′46″N 122°52′12″W	Lebanon vicinity	Demolished in 2010.
2	St. Mary's Roman Catholic Church		June 5, 1975 (#75001587)	April 16, 1990	822 S. Ellsworth St.	Albany vicinity	Destroyed by arson fire October 29, 1989.
3	Weddle Bridge	Weddle Bridge	November 29, 1979 (#79002114)	January 11, 1989	NW of Crabtree	Crabtree vicinity	Relocated in 1987.

== See also ==
- National Register of Historic Places listings in Oregon
- Listings in neighboring counties: Benton, Deschutes, Jefferson, Lane, Marion, Polk
- Historic preservation
- History of Oregon
- Lists of Oregon-related topics
