= Chamberlain House =

Chamberlain House may refer to:

== Places and structures ==
=== Canada ===
- Chamberlain House (Ottawa, Ontario), a designated heritage property in Ottawa, Ontario

=== Scotland ===
- Chamberlain's House, a listed historical building (Category A) in Inveraray

=== United States ===
(by state then city)

- Cyrus C. Chamberlain House, Southington, Connecticut, a contributing property in the Southington Center Historic District, which is listed on the NRHP in Connecticut
- Chamberlain House (Honolulu, Hawaii), Honolulu, Hawaii, listed on the NRHP in Hawaii and part of the Mission Houses Museum
- Chamberlain-Bordeau House, Southbridge, Massachusetts, NRHP-listed
- Samuel Chamberlain House, Stoneham, Massachusetts, NRHP-listed
- Charles Chamberlain House, Worcester, Massachusetts, NRHP-listed
- Chamberlain-Flagg House, Worcester, Massachusetts, NRHP-listed
- H. S. M. Spielman House, Tekamah, Nebraska, also known as Chamberlain House, NRHP-listed
- Benjamin Chamberlain House, Johnstown, New York, NRHP-listed
- Daniel Chamberlain House, Newark Valley, New York, NRHP-listed
- George Earle Chamberlain House (disambiguation), two different houses in Oregon, both listed on the NRHP
- Frank Chamberlain Clark House, Medford, Oregon, NRHP-listed
- Chamberlain-Pennell House, Media, Pennsylvania, NRHP-listed
- Bowman-Chamberlain House, Kanab, Utah, NRHP-listed
- West Chester (Des Moines, Iowa), Des Moines, Iowa, also known as D.S. Chamberlain House, and Wesley Acres, NRHP-listed

== See also ==
- Chamberlin House (disambiguation)
