= Fish Lake Remount Depot =

Historic Forest Service station in Linn County, Oregon

- Fish Lake Guard Station
- U.S. National Register of Historic Places
- U.S. Historic district
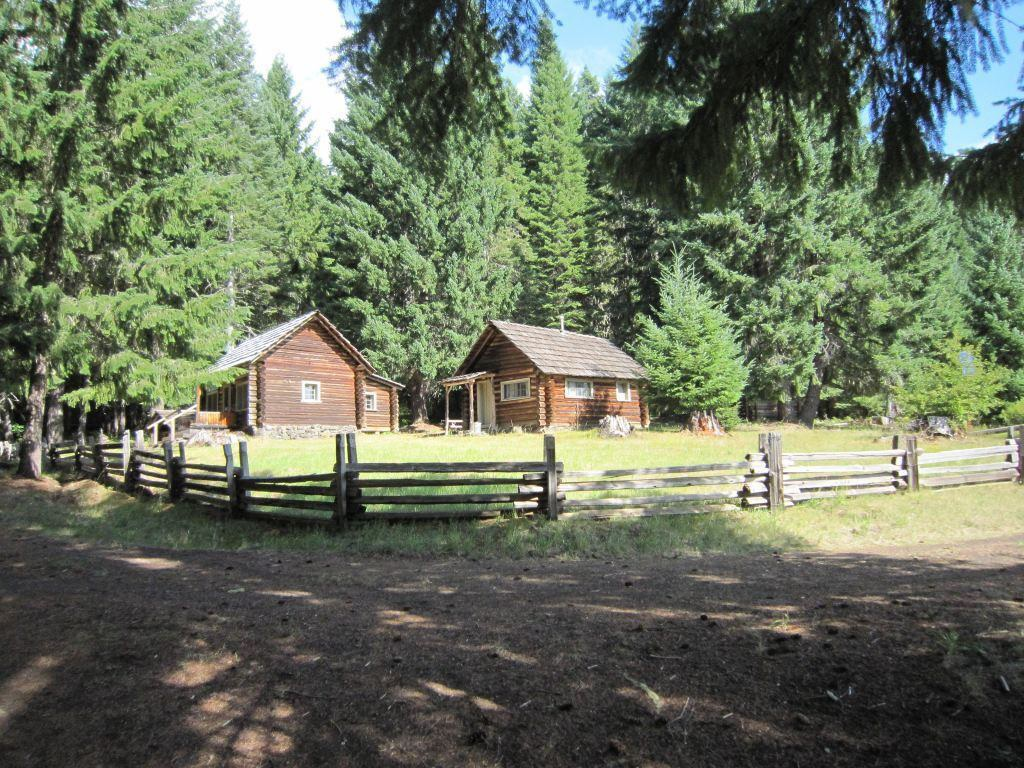
- The dispatcher's cabin and commissary cabin in 2012

- Location within Oregon Location within the United States
- Location: Willamette National Forest, near McKenzie Bridge, Oregon
- Coordinates: 44°24′13.33″N 122°00′22.69″W
- Area: 16.81 acres (6.80 ha)
- Built: 1921–1960
- Architects: United States Forest Service; Civilian Conservation Corps
- Architectural style: Forest Service rustic
- NRHP reference No.: 14000381
- Added to NRHP: June 27, 2014

Fish Lake Guard Station, also known as the Fish Lake Remount Station or Fish Lake Remount Depot, is a historic United States Forest Service complex in the Willamette National Forest of Linn County, Oregon. Located near McKenzie Bridge, it served as a fire-dispatch station, administrative site, and base for horses and mules used in remote areas of the central Cascade Range.

The 16.81-acre (6.80 ha) historic district was added to the National Register of Historic Places in 2014. It contains Forest Service buildings from the 1920s, remount facilities built by the Civilian Conservation Corps during the 1930s, and part of the historic Santiam Wagon Road.

== History ==
A way station was established at Fish Lake along the Santiam Wagon Road in 1867. The seasonal lake and surrounding meadow provided water and pasture for travelers and livestock crossing the Cascades. By the late 19th century, the stop included lodging, corrals, a barn, and a blacksmith shop. It closed in 1907 as wagon-road traffic declined.

The Forest Service began using Fish Lake for horseback fire patrols in the early 20th century and reserved land around the lake for administrative use in 1906. In 1914, Fish Lake became the fire-dispatch headquarters for the Santiam National Forest.

Several surviving buildings were constructed during the 1920s, including the dispatcher's cabin, commissary, springhouse, and supervisor's cabin. The dispatcher's cabin contained a telephone switchboard connected to nearby lookout towers, guard stations, and district offices. Personnel at Fish Lake coordinated firefighters, equipment, supplies, and pack animals sent into remote areas.

=== Remount depot ===
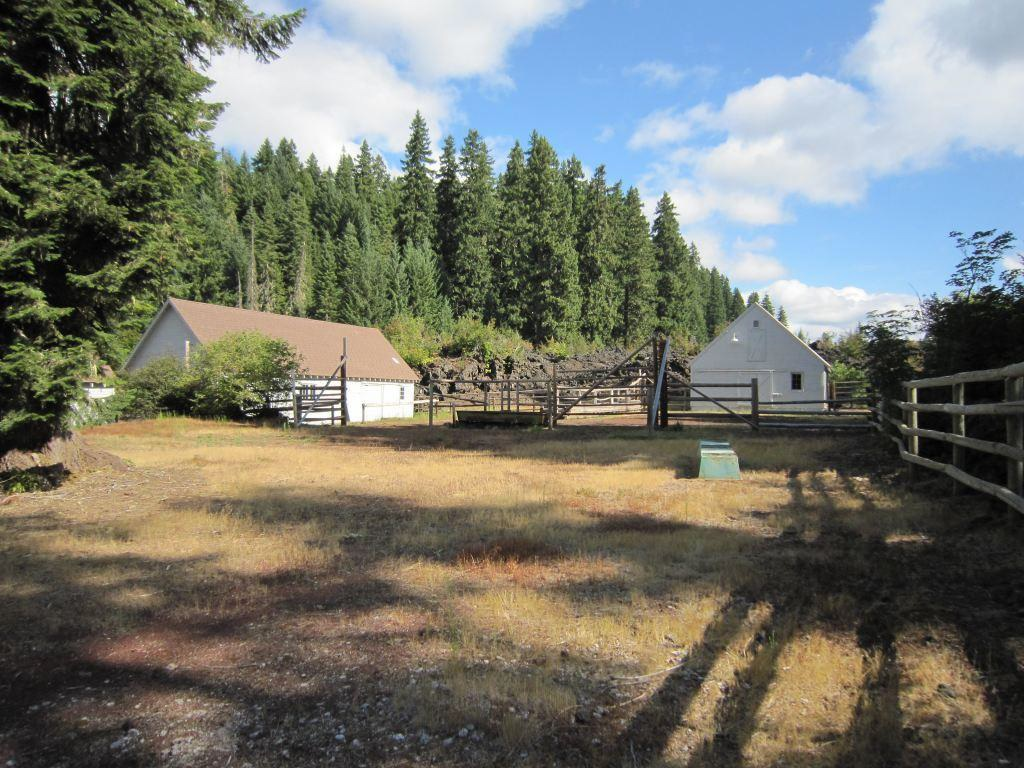
The corral, storage building, and barn

Fish Lake developed into a regional remount depot for Forest Service horses and mules. Pack animals carried firefighters, food, tools, and construction materials to locations that were inaccessible by road.

After the Willamette National Forest was created in 1933, Civilian Conservation Corps crews expanded the complex. They constructed a barn, corral, storage buildings, fuel house, and a lava-rock stock driveway. The buildings used the rustic architectural style associated with early Forest Service development.

The station's fire-dispatch role declined after World War II as roads, vehicles, aircraft, and newer communications reduced reliance on pack animals. Its remount facilities remained useful, however, especially after the Wilderness Act of 1964 restricted motorized equipment in designated wilderness areas. Pack strings from Fish Lake supported work in the Mount Jefferson Wilderness, Mount Washington Wilderness, Middle Santiam Wilderness, and Menagerie Wilderness.

The last resident packer and pack string left Fish Lake in 2005. The site is now used for recreation, historic interpretation, and preservation. Several cabins are operated as seasonal rentals.

== Historic district ==
The historic district contains 18 contributing buildings, structures, and sites. The northern section includes the Forest Service administrative buildings constructed mainly during the 1920s. The southern section contains the CCC-era remount facilities.

The district was listed on the National Register for its associations with federal conservation, the Civilian Conservation Corps, and wilderness management. It was also recognized as an example of Forest Service rustic architecture.

== Regional Forest Service network ==
Fish Lake formed part of a larger network of Forest Service sites in the Santiam Canyon and central Cascades. Independence Prairie Ranger Station served as an upper North Santiam summer headquarters until about 1933. A new road from Detroit toward Fish Lake bypassed Independence Prairie, contributing to its reduced use.

Marion Forks Guard Station was constructed beside the new road around 1935. Marion Forks became a more accessible roadside administrative station, while Fish Lake continued to serve primarily as a fire-dispatch, supply, and pack-animal facility.

== See also ==
- National Register of Historic Places listings in Linn County, Oregon
