= George Earle Chamberlain House =

George Earle Chamberlain House may refer to:

- George Earle Chamberlain House (Albany, Oregon)
- George Earle Chamberlain House (Portland, Oregon)
