= Thompson's Mills State Heritage Site =

State park in Oregon, United States

Thompson’s Mills State Heritage Site
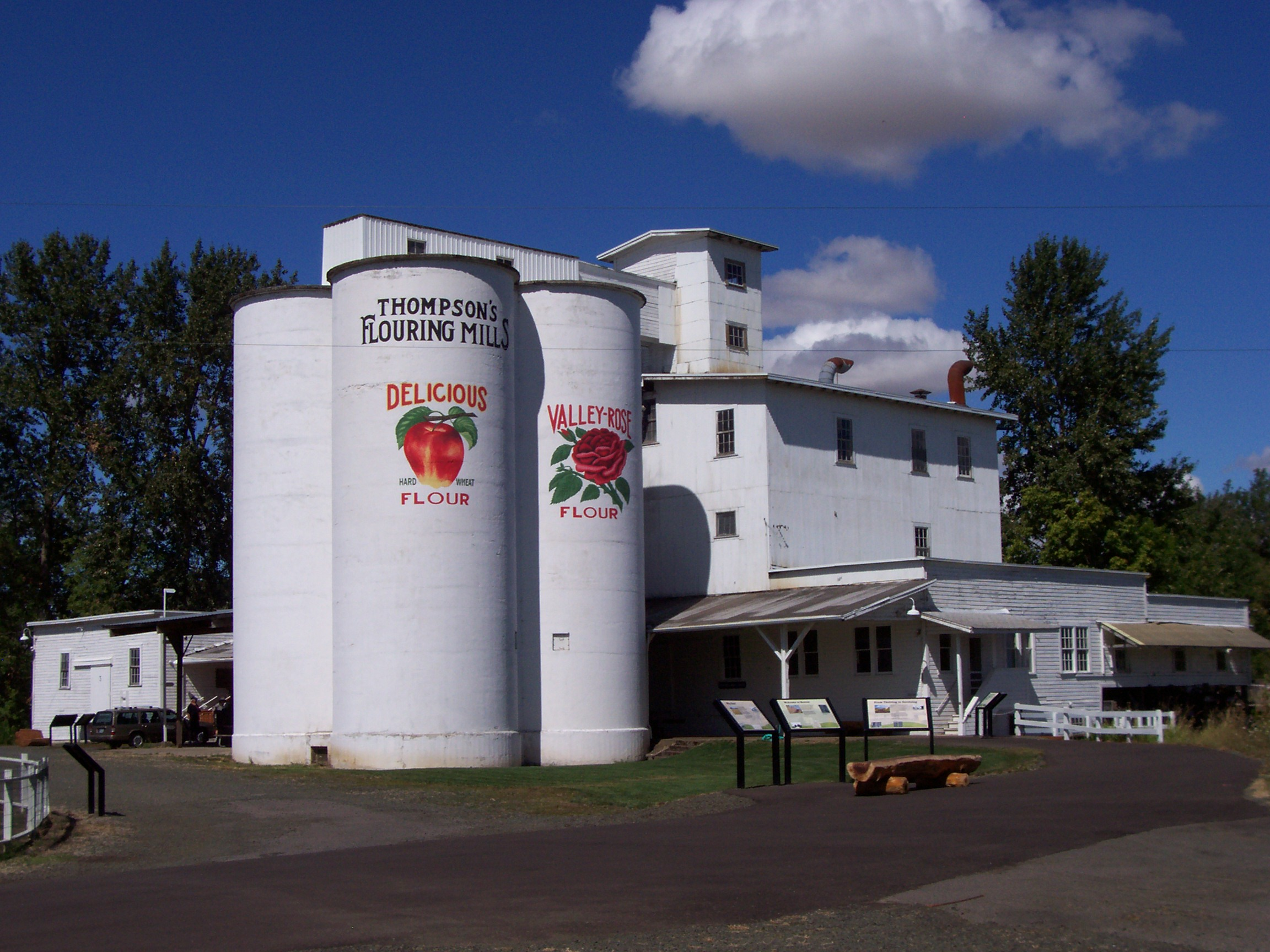
- Boston Flour Mill

- Location within Oregon Location within the United States
- Type: Public, state
- Location: Linn County, Oregon
- Nearest city: Shedd
- Coordinates: 44°27′39″N 123°04′54″W
- Created: December 2007
- Operator: Oregon Parks and Recreation Department

Thompson's Mills State Heritage Site is a state park near Shedd in Linn County, Oregon, United States, administered by the Oregon Parks and Recreation Department. The mill was first built in 1858. It burned down in 1862 but was rebuilt right away and the 12 inch by 12 inch hand hewn beams cut and placed while Lincoln was in office are still visible inside the mill today. A series of owners adapted the mill to changing times turning the flour mill to a feed mill and eventually a hydroelectric plant operating until 2004, making it one of Oregon's oldest continuously operating water-powered businesses. Oregon State Parks purchased the property in 2004 and the park was opened to the public in December 2007. The property was acquired and restored under Governor Ted Kulongoski's "park-a-year" plan, in which one new state park is to be opened every year. Free guided tours are offered daily allowing visitors to see the water powered turbines and machinery in action. The grounds are being restored to the 1910-1930s era with the heirloom orchard, gardens and plantings restored as well as heritage poultry roaming the grounds and original fence lines and paths; all will be open to the public when complete.

== See also ==
- Boston Flour Mill
- List of Oregon state parks
