= Hackleman Historic District =

Historic district in Oregon, United States

- U.S. National Register of Historic Places
- U.S. Historic district
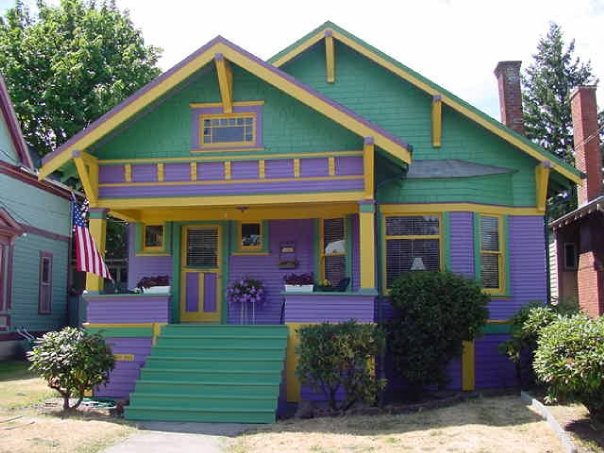
- 1913 Elmer J. Dannals Home

- Location within Oregon Location within the United States
- Location: Albany, Oregon, Oregon
- Coordinates: 44°38′5″N 123°5′58″W
- NRHP reference No.: 82003735
- Added to NRHP: March 15, 1982

The Hackleman Historic District in Albany Oregon, was placed on the list of National Register of Historic Places (NRHP) in 1982. The district contains 228 historic properties within about a 28 city blocks area. The district was named after Abner Hackleman who came to Albany in 1845.

== See also ==
- National Register of Historic Places listings in Linn County, Oregon
- George Earle Chamberlain House (Albany, Oregon)
