= Harrisburg Odd Fellows Hall =

- U.S. National Register of Historic Places
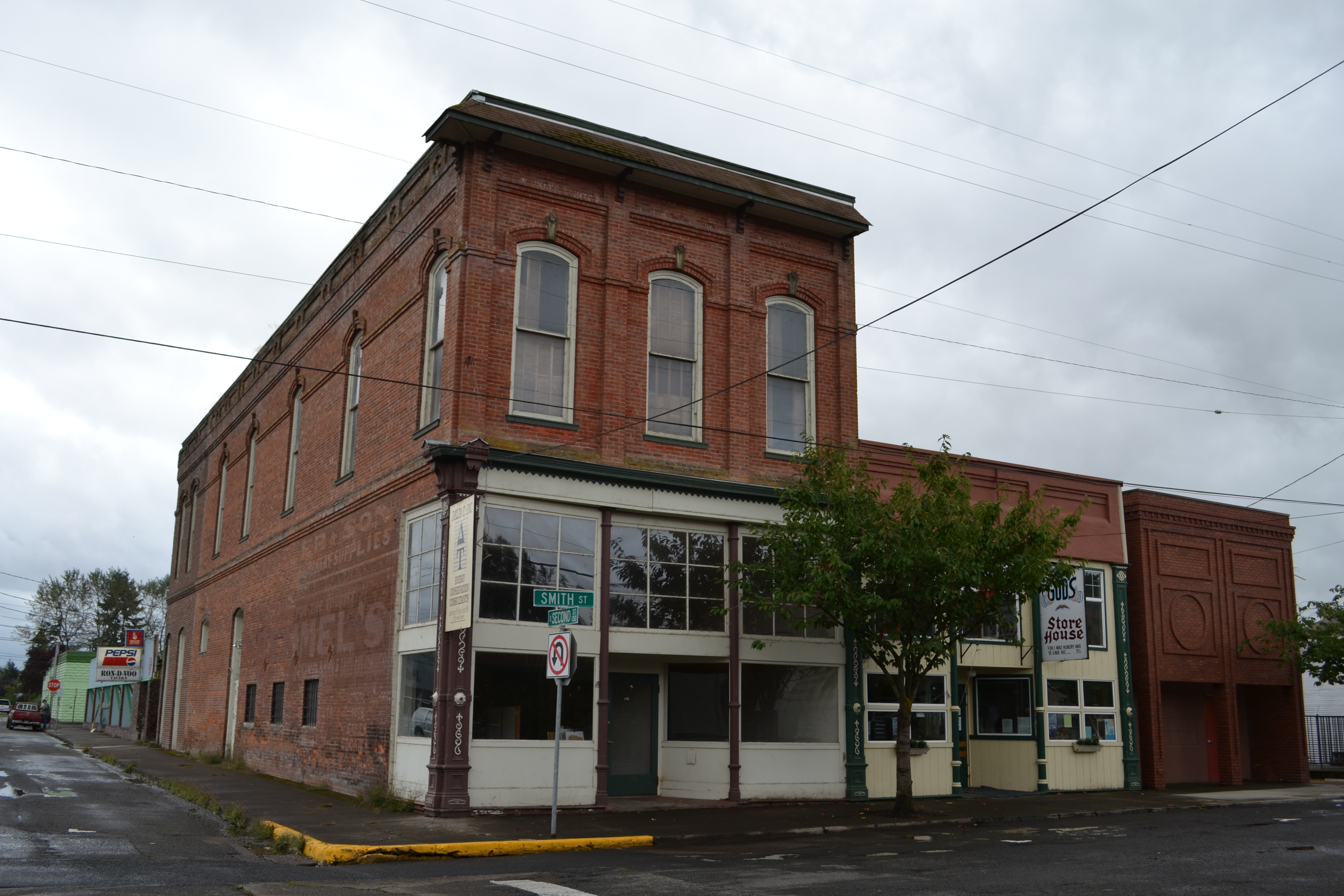

- Location within Oregon Location within the United States
- Location: 190 Smith St., Harrisburg, Oregon
- Coordinates: 44°16′20″N 123°10′12″W
- Area: 0.1 acres (0.040 ha)
- Built: 1882
- Architectural style: Italianate
- NRHP reference No.: 92001382
- Added to NRHP: October 15, 1992

The Harrisburg Odd Fellows Hall, also known as I.O.O.F. Covenant Lodge No. 12, in the small community of Harrisburg, Oregon, USA, was built in 1882. Odd Fellows chapter members L. Stites, a local brickmason and brickyard owner, and John Martin, a carpenter, significantly helped in its construction. The Harrisburg Disseminator then declared it to be "'the finest building in this part of the Willamette Valley'".

It was listed on the National Register of Historic Places in 1992 for its Italianate architecture. It was historically as a meeting hall, a theater and a specialty store.

It is a prominent historic building in Harrisbury's old commercial center, and, in 1992, it had a completely intact lodge hall in the front 50 feet (15 m) of its second floor. It is a two-story 25 feet (7.6 m) by 100 feet (30 m) brick building that is mostly intact, with the exception of its missing cornice. The lodge hall includes plaster walls, coved cornice, door and window trim, tongue-and-grove wainscot and "bases and crested arched backing daises at opposite ends of the hall".
