= United Presbyterian Church of Shedd =

Historic church in Oregon, United States

- U.S. National Register of Historic Places
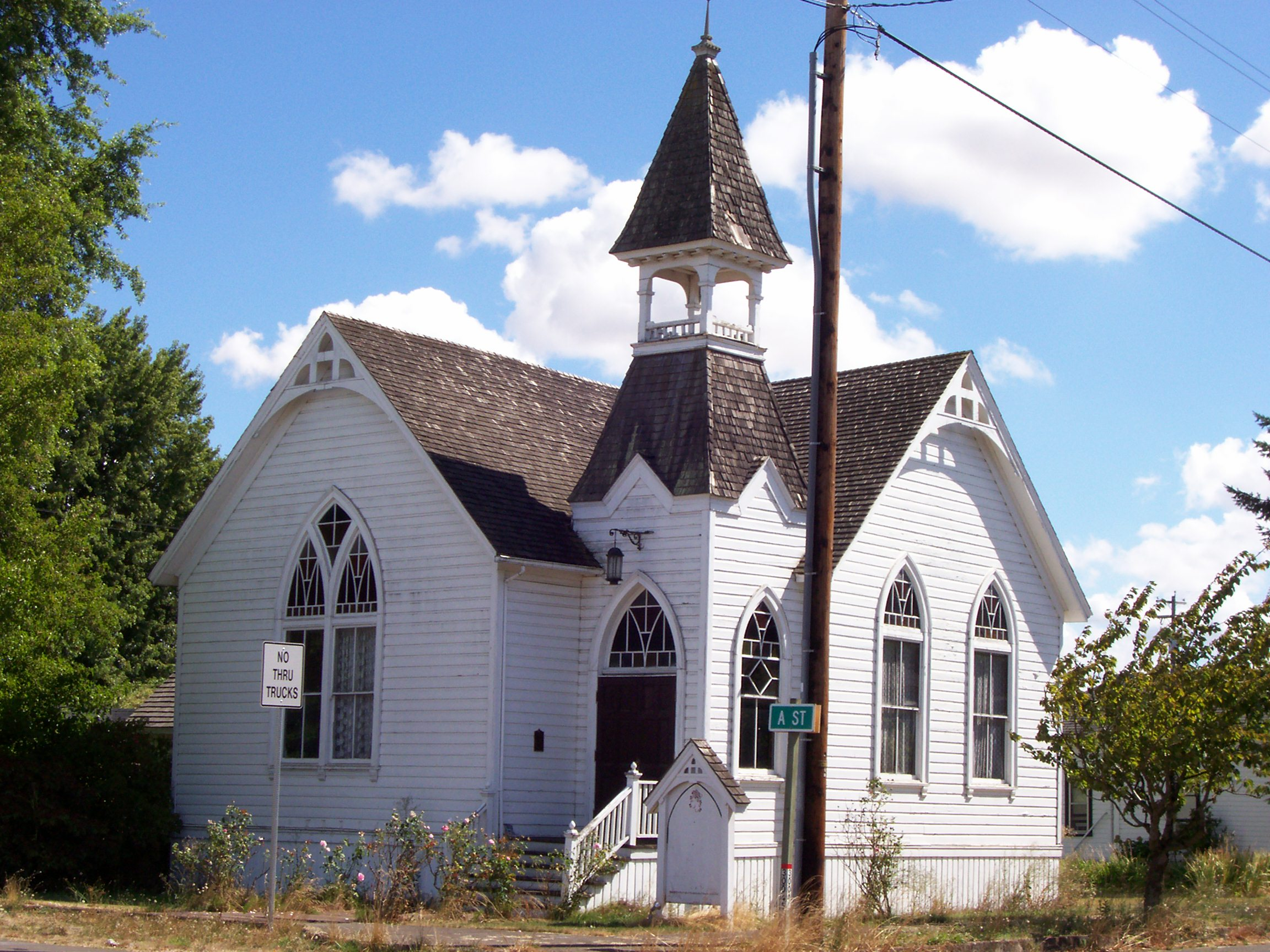

- Location within Oregon Location within the United States
- Location: 30045 OR 99 E, Shedd, Oregon
- Coordinates: 44°27′38″N 123°6′31″W
- Area: 0.3 acres (0.12 ha)
- Built: 1892
- Architectural style: Gothic Revival
- NRHP reference No.: 98000209
- Added to NRHP: March 5, 1998

The United Presbyterian Church of Shedd (also known as Valley Rose Chapel) is a historic Presbyterian church at 30045 OR 99 East in Shedd, Oregon. It was built in 1892 in a Gothic Revival style and was added to the National Register of Historic Places (NRHP) in 1998.

Its NRHP nomination argued it to be "a graceful, wood-frame Gothic Revival church, bestowed with a substantive role in local history", being located just a few miles from the Linn County location of the first United Presbyterian Church "in the entire world" to be formed. And this Shedd church drew from those congregations.
