= Henry and Mary Cyrus Barn =

Coordinates: 44.62415°N 122.88502°W

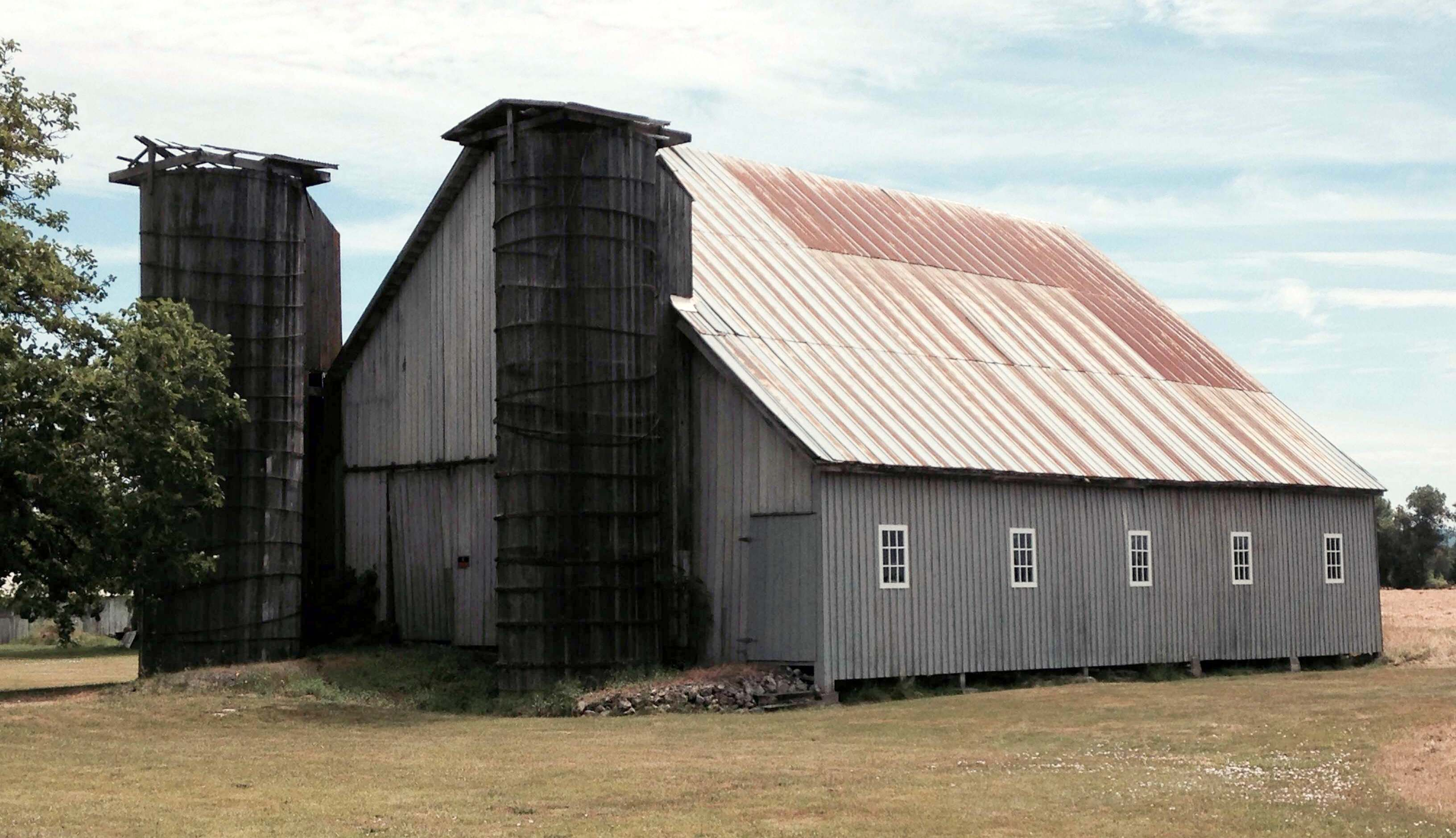
The barn in 2015

The Henry and Mary Cyrus Barn in Lebanon, Oregon, in the United States was added to the National Register of Historic Places on November 9, 2015.

== See also ==
- National Register of Historic Places listings in Linn County, Oregon
