= Independence Prairie Ranger Station =

- U.S. National Register of Historic Places
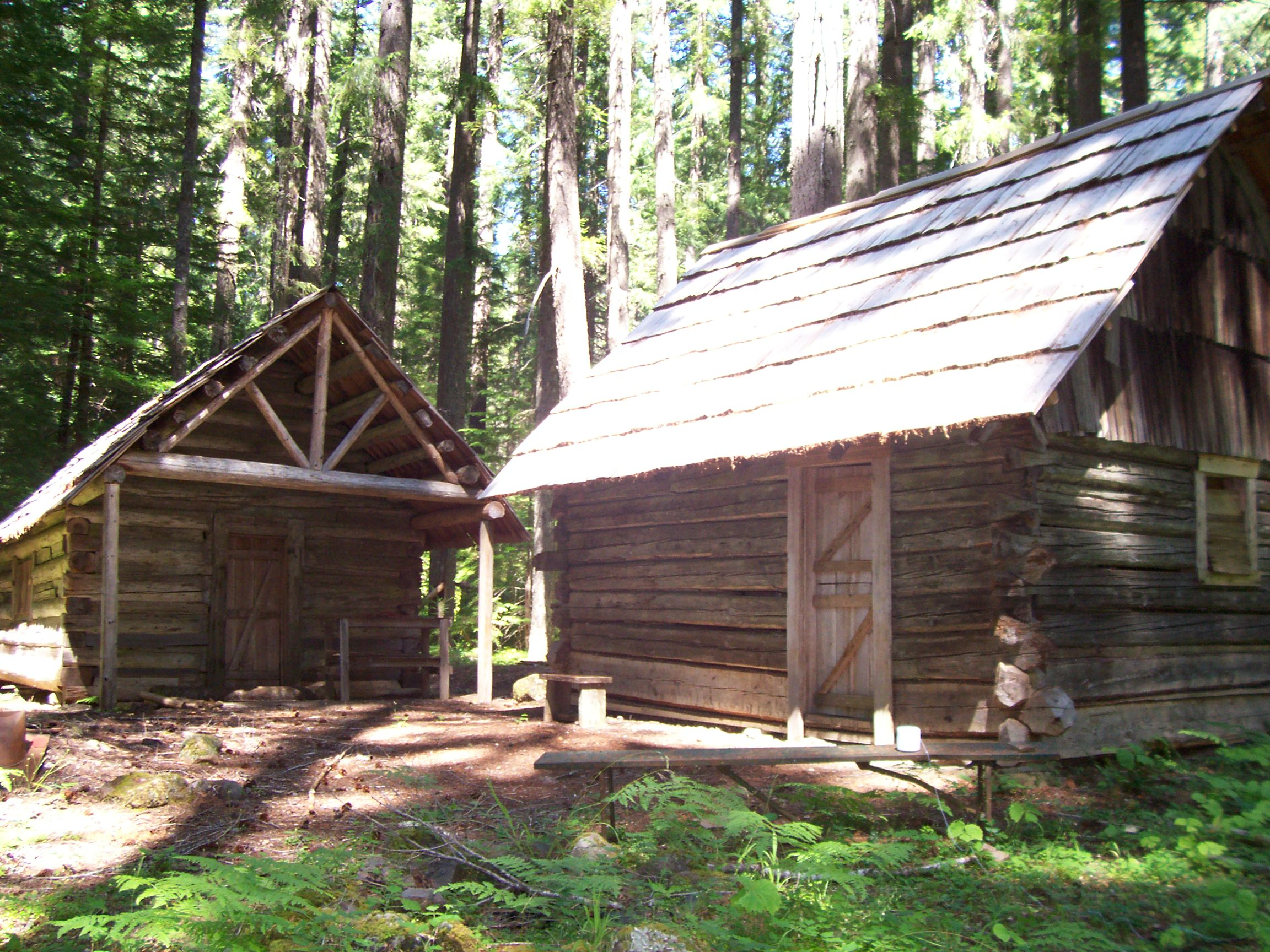
- One of the station's surviving log buildings in 2010

- Location within Oregon Location within the United States
- Nearest city: Willamette National Forest, Marion Forks, Oregon
- Coordinates: 44.617222°N 121.939444°W
- Built: c. 1910
- Architectural style: Late pioneer log construction
- MPS: USDA Forest Service Administrative Buildings in Oregon
- NRHP reference No.: 83002161
- Added to NRHP: March 29, 1983

The Independence Prairie Ranger Station is a historic United States Forest Service administrative site near Marion Forks, Oregon, in Willamette National Forest. Established about 1910, it served as a seasonal headquarters for Forest Service patrolmen and workers responsible for forest improvements and grazing administration in the upper North Santiam River watershed. The property contains two small log buildings and was listed on the National Register of Historic Places in 1983.

== History ==
The Independence Prairie Ranger Station used as the headquarters for the headwaters of the North Santiam River, was established about 1910, and is described in its National Register nomination as the oldest surviving administrative complex associated with what is now Willamette National Forest.

The site was used during most of the year, except winter, by patrolmen and workers engaged in forest improvements and grazing administration. It served as a summer headquarters until about 1933. Around that time, the Santiam and Cascade national forests were combined to form Willamette National Forest, and a road was completed from Detroit toward the Forest Service remount station at Fish Lake. The new road passed approximately one-quarter mile from Independence Prairie. Around 1935, the Forest Service constructed the Marion Forks Guard Station beside the road, about three-quarters of a mile south of the older station. According to the nomination, limited use of Independence Prairie probably continued into the early or middle 1940s.

== See also ==
- Marion Forks Guard Station
- National Register of Historic Places listings in Linn County, Oregon
