= Chamberlin House =

Chamberlin House may refer to:

in the United States

(by state then city)

- Chamberlin House, Chicago, Illinois, a housing partition which partially comprises the University of Chicago's Burton–Judson Courts
- Clarence D. Chamberlin House, Denison, Iowa, listed on the National Register of Historic Places (NRHP) in Crawford County
- Chamberlin House (Concord, New Hampshire), a shingle-style house listed on the NRHP in Merrimack County
- Clarence Chamberlin House, Eau Claire, Wisconsin, listed on the NRHP in Eau Claire County
- West Chester (Des Moines, Iowa) also known as Chamberlain House and Wesley Acres, on NRHP

== See also ==
- Chamberlain House (disambiguation)
