= Lebanon station (Oregon) =

- Lebanon Southern Pacific Railroad Depot
- U.S. National Register of Historic Places
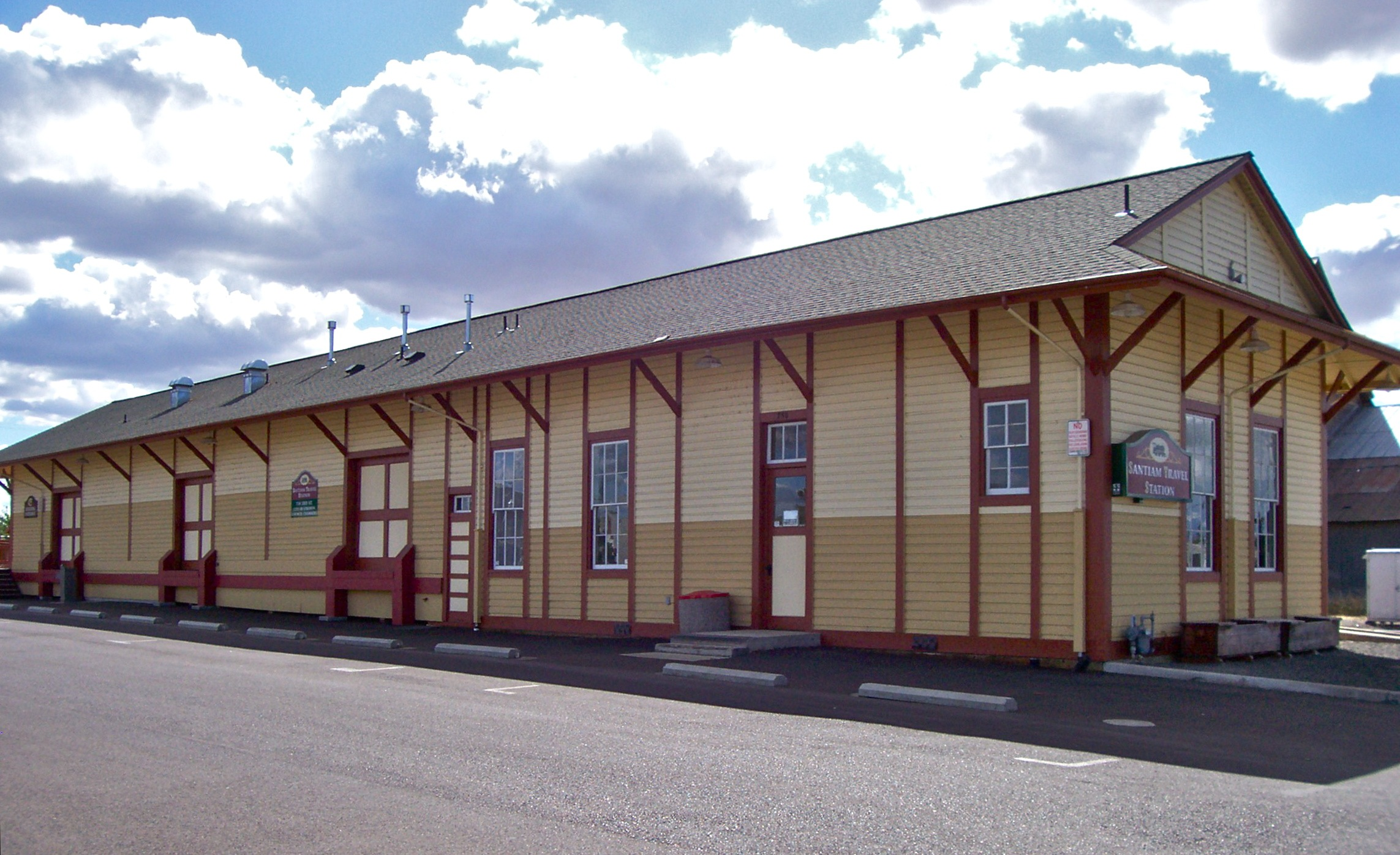
- Lebanon Southern Pacific Railroad Depot in 2009

- Location within Oregon Location within the United States
- Location: 735 Third St, Lebanon, Oregon
- Coordinates: 44°32′19.8″N 122°54′36.3″W
- Built: circa 1908
- NRHP reference No.: 97000584
- Added to NRHP: June 13, 1997

The Lebanon Southern Pacific Railroad Depot is a former railway station located in Lebanon, Oregon, Oregon, listed on the National Register of Historic Places. It was constructed in 1908 for use by the Southern Pacific Company (SP), to replace an 1880 depot that had become too small for the amount of traffic it was handling. It is a Southern Pacific standard design, a One Story Combination Depot No. 23, which was intended to serve both freight and passenger traffic. The building ceased to be used by passenger services in the mid-1950s, after which it remained in use as a base for freight operations. The depot closed in 1985 and was then vacant for several years, until the City of Lebanon purchased it from SP in 1996. It was added to the NRHP in 1997.

== See also ==
- National Register of Historic Places listings in Linn County, Oregon

Preceding station	Southern Pacific Railroad	Following station
Irvinville toward Toledo	Toledo – Mill City	Crabtree toward Mill City
