= George Earle Chamberlain House (Portland, Oregon) =

Historic building in Portland, Oregon, U.S.

- U.S. National Register of Historic Places
- U.S. Historic district – Contributing property
- Portland Historic Landmark
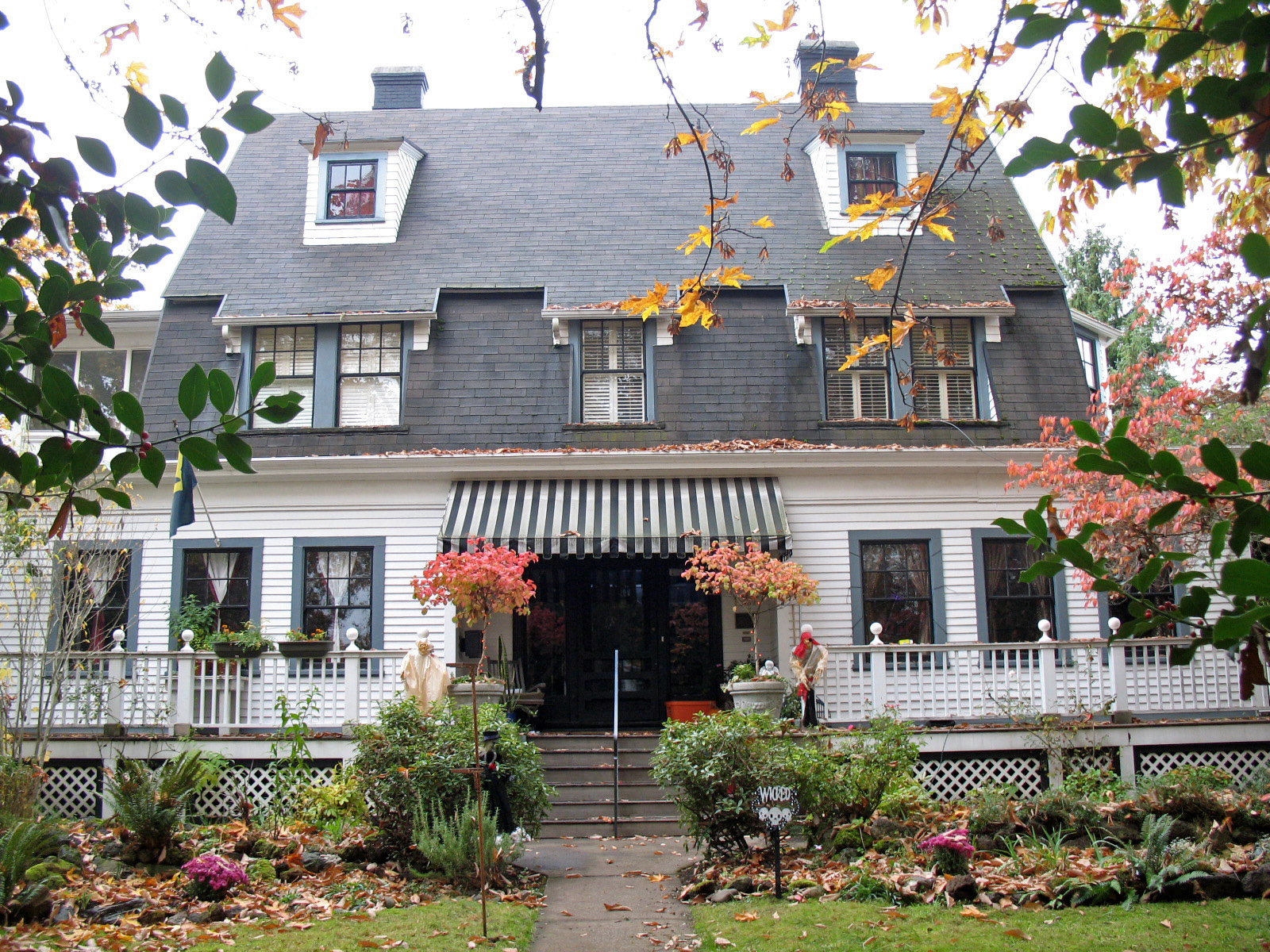
- George Earle Chamberlain House in 2009

- Location within Portland, Oregon
- Location: 1927 NE Tillamook Street; Portland, Oregon
- Coordinates: 45°32′16″N 122°38′46″W
- Area: 0.23 acres (0.093 ha)
- Built: 1893; remodeled 1904
- Architectural style: Colonial Revival
- Part of: Irvington Historic District (ID10000850)
- NRHP reference No.: 91000815
- Added to NRHP: June 19, 1991

The George Earle Chamberlain House is a house located in northeast Portland, Oregon, listed on the National Register of Historic Places (NRHP). The house was built in 1893 and its original owner was Frank M. Warren. In 1904, the house was acquired by George Earle Chamberlain, who was then in his first term as Governor of Oregon, and Chamberlain owned and occupied the house until his death in 1928. Soon after buying the house, Chamberlain remodeled the first and second floors, both interior and exterior. Since the time of Chamberlain's ownership, modifications to the building have been few.

The house was added to the NRHP in 1991. In 2010, it was included in the National Register-listed Irvington Historic District. A home in Albany, Oregon, which Chamberlain owned, and in which he resided, from 1882 to 1892, is also on the NRHP and is also listed as the George Earle Chamberlain House.

== See also ==
- National Register of Historic Places listings in Northeast Portland, Oregon
- George Earle Chamberlain House (Albany, Oregon)
