= Marion Forks Guard Station =

- U.S. National Register of Historic Places
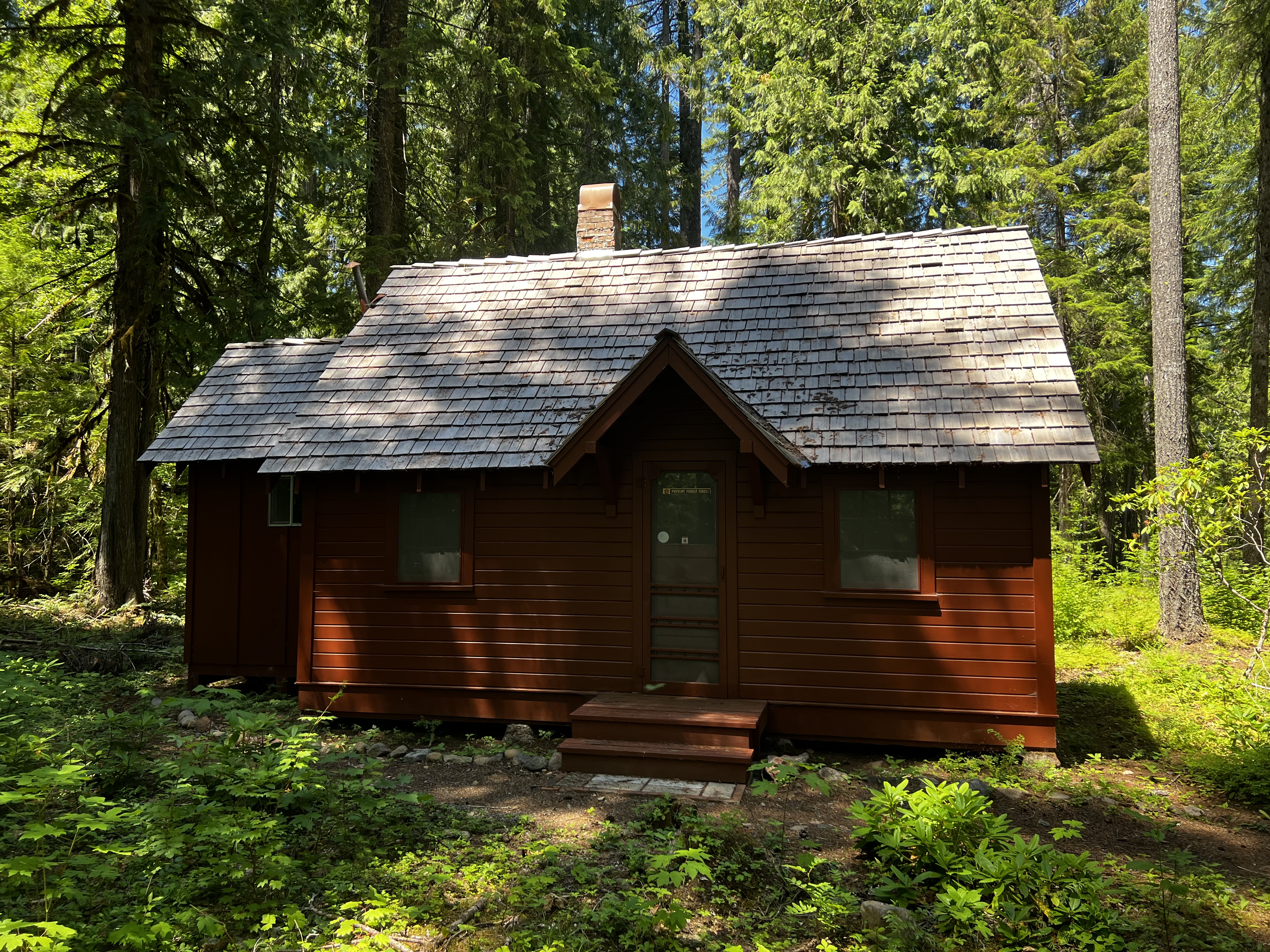
- Front facade of the guard station in 2023

- Location within Oregon Location within the United States
- Location: Willamette National Forest, Marion Forks, Oregon
- Coordinates: 44°36′51″N 121°56′56″W
- Built: 1935
- Architect: Multiple
- Architectural style: Rustic architecture of USDA
- MPS: USDA Forest Service Administrative Buildings in Oregon and Washington Built by the CCC MPS
- NRHP reference No.: 91000167
- Added to NRHP: March 6, 1991

The Marion Forks Guard Station is a historic United States Forest Service administrative site near Marion Forks, Oregon, in Willamette National Forest. Built in 1935, the station originally combined office space with employee living quarters and was accompanied by a detached two-vehicle garage. The property was listed on the National Register of Historic Places in 1991.

== History ==
The station was constructed by the Civilian Conservation Corps during the expansion of Forest Service facilities under the New Deal. Its construction followed the completion of a road from Detroit toward the Forest Service remount station at Fish Lake. The road bypassed the earlier Independence Prairie Ranger Station, which had served as a seasonal headquarters for Forest Service personnel working in the upper North Santiam watershed. The Marion Forks station was established beside the new road, approximately three-quarters of a mile south of Independence Prairie.

The historic property includes the one-story, wood-frame guard station and its detached garage, both clad in horizontal shiplap siding. The property was listed in part as an example of the rustic architectural style developed by the Forest Service's Pacific Northwest Region. The guard station's exterior was documented in photographs taken by Kathryn Elsesser for the National Register nomination in November 1985.
