= Benjamin Chamberlain House =

Historic house in New York, United States

- U.S. National Register of Historic Places
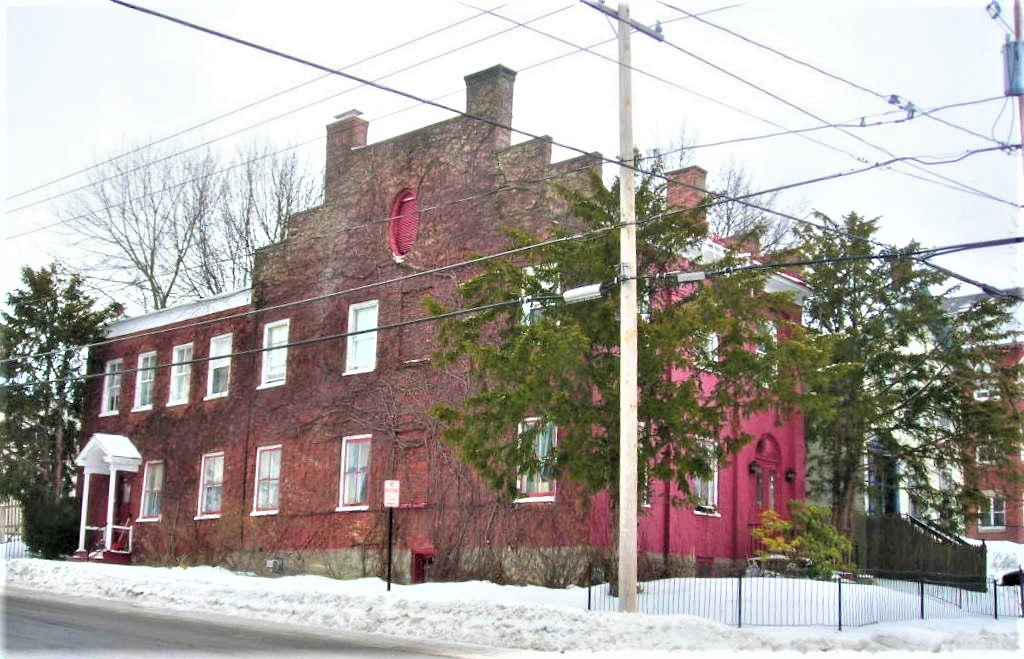
- Chamberlain Benjamin House, February 2008

- Location within New York Location within the United States
- Location: 100 Market St., Johnstown, New York
- Coordinates: 43°0′15″N 74°22′22″W
- Built: 1816
- Architectural style: Federal
- NRHP reference No.: 99000989
- Added to NRHP: August 12, 1999

The Benjamin Chamberlain House is a historic home at 100 South Market Street at the corner of Clinton Street Johnstown, Fulton County, New York. It was built in 1816 and is a 2 1/2-story, gable-roofed, brick, Federal period residence. It consists of a three-by-four-bay main block with a long, rectangular 2-story, four-bay rear wing. The interior is based on a side-hall plan. It features a blind-arcade front with brick pilasters and stepped parapet gable ends.

It was listed on the National Register of Historic Places in 1999.
