= Marion Forks, Oregon =

Unincorporated community in the state of Oregon, United States

- Unincorporated community
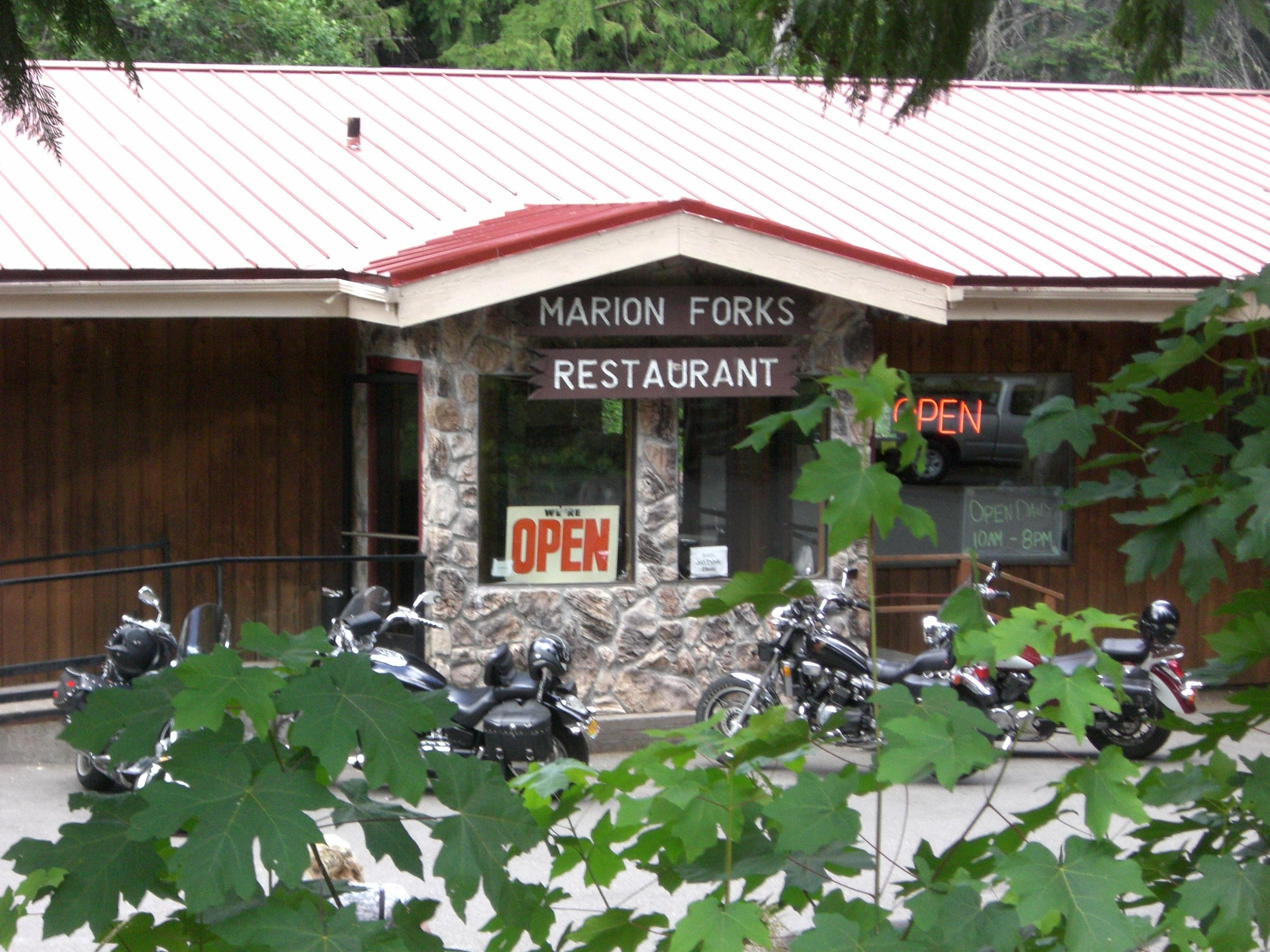
- Marion Forks Restaurant

- Location within Oregon Location within the United States
- Coordinates: 44°36′55″N 121°56′53″W
- Country: United States
- State: Oregon
- County: Linn
- Elevation: 2,444 ft (745 m)
- Time zone: UTC-8 (Pacific (PST))
  - Summer (DST): UTC-7 (PDT)
- ZIP code: 97350
- Area codes: 503 and 971
- GNIS feature ID: 1123762

Marion Forks is an unincorporated community on the North Santiam Highway, 15 miles (24 km) south of the city of Detroit, in Linn County, Oregon, United States.

The community is named for the nearby river fork where Marion Creek is received by the North Santiam River at the latter's river mile 86. Marion Creek was formerly known as the Marion Fork Santiam River.

Marion Forks is served by the Santiam Canyon School District. The Oregon Department of Fish and Wildlife Marion Forks fish hatchery is south of the community, and the Willamette National Forest Marion Forks Campground is near the hatchery, next to Marion Creek.

There are two National Register of Historic Places-listed structures in the Marion Forks area: Independence Prairie Ranger Station and Marion Forks Guard Station.

== History ==
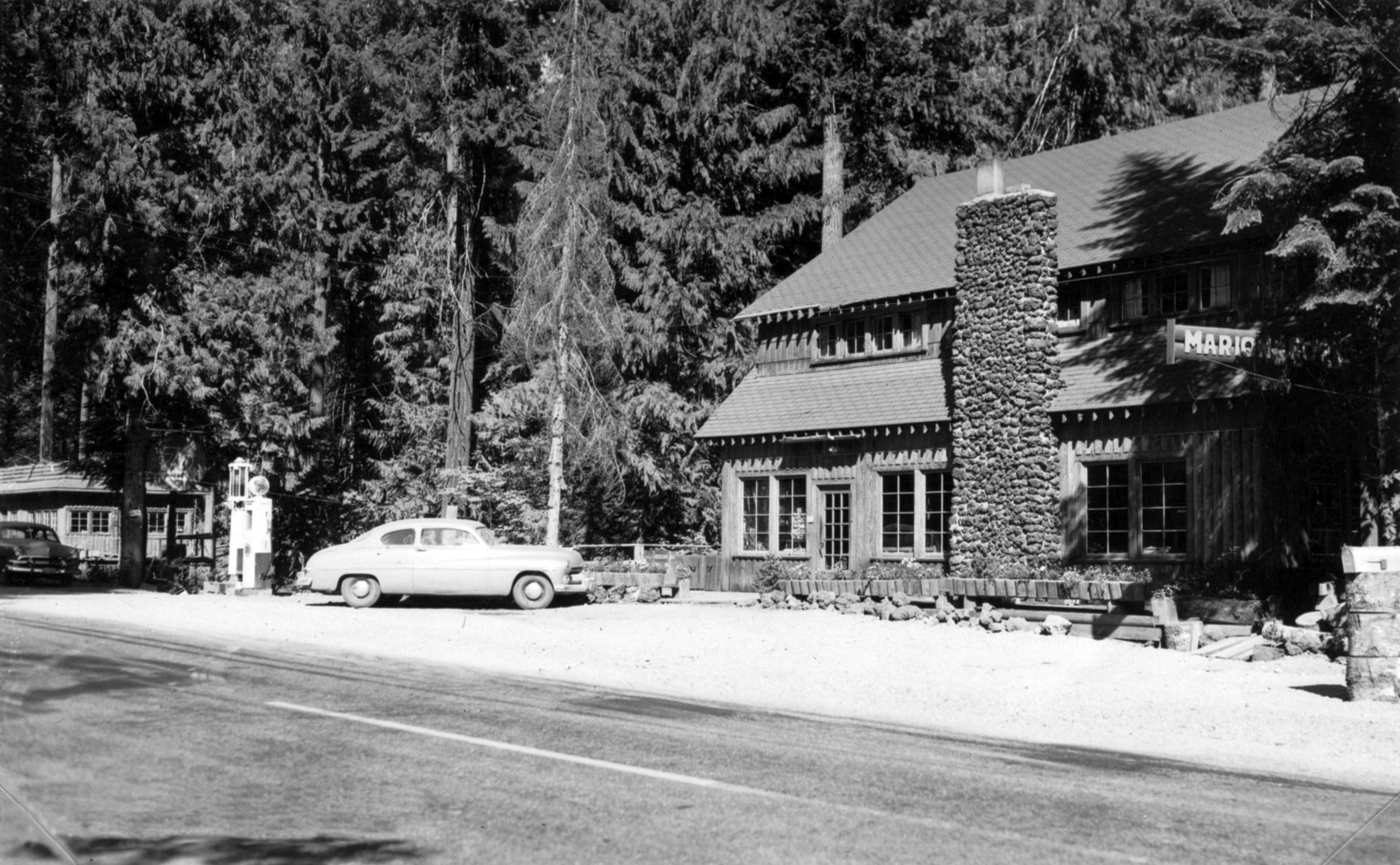
Marion Forks Lodge in Marion Forks, 1964

In 1866, William Horn filed a homestead on the property, hoping to sell timber to the Oregon Pacific Railroad, then under construction east from Corvallis. The railroad stopped short of Marion Forks by twelve miles, and Horn's property languished until 1932, when Scott Young, recently of Cascade Locks, purchased the deed.

Young worked for the Forest Service, and he saw an opportunity to serve the room-and-board needs of the road crews on Highways 20 and 22. Using salvaged lumber, the Young family built cabins and a cookhouse, which later grew into Marion Forks Lodge Restaurant. Rebuilt after fires in 1947 and 1972, the restaurant became the center of a small community of rustic vacation cabins and small homes for a few dozen residents.

The Marion Forks community grew slightly with the addition of Marion Forks Hatchery in 1951, an effort to mitigate fish loss from the Detroit Dam downstream. Though the restaurant closed temporarily in 2008, Marion Forks has remained a stopover for travelers and a home for long-time residents.

The Marion Forks Lodge was constructed in 1933 by Nan and Scott Young soon after the opening of the Santiam Highway pass. The Marion Forks Lodge burned to the ground in 1972.

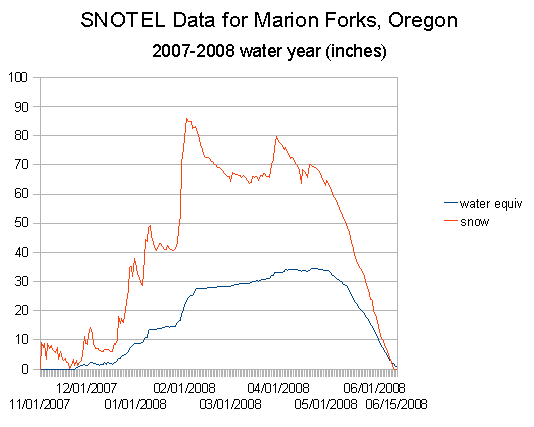

== Climate ==
This region experiences warm (but not hot) and dry summers, with no average monthly temperatures above 71.6 °F. According to the Köppen Climate Classification system, Mapleton has a warm-summer Mediterranean climate, abbreviated "Csb" on climate maps.

Climate data for Marion Forks, Oregon (1991–2020 normals, extremes 1948–present)
Month	Jan	Feb	Mar	Apr	May	Jun	Jul	Aug	Sep	Oct	Nov	Dec	Year
Record high °F (°C)	59 (15)	69 (21)	77 (25)	89 (32)	101 (38)	108 (42)	103 (39)	105 (41)	99 (37)	92 (33)	74 (23)	56 (13)	108 (42)
Mean maximum °F (°C)	50.2 (10.1)	57.2 (14.0)	67.1 (19.5)	76.2 (24.6)	84.9 (29.4)	90.4 (32.4)	95.6 (35.3)	95.8 (35.4)	91.1 (32.8)	77.1 (25.1)	58.7 (14.8)	47.5 (8.6)	97.7 (36.5)
Mean daily maximum °F (°C)	39.7 (4.3)	44.0 (6.7)	49.4 (9.7)	55.5 (13.1)	64.4 (18.0)	71.3 (21.8)	81.9 (27.7)	81.8 (27.7)	74.4 (23.6)	59.8 (15.4)	45.7 (7.6)	38.3 (3.5)	58.9 (14.9)
Daily mean °F (°C)	33.4 (0.8)	35.8 (2.1)	39.4 (4.1)	44.0 (6.7)	51.3 (10.7)	57.1 (13.9)	64.3 (17.9)	63.8 (17.7)	57.6 (14.2)	47.5 (8.6)	38.3 (3.5)	32.9 (0.5)	47.1 (8.4)
Mean daily minimum °F (°C)	27.1 (−2.7)	27.5 (−2.5)	29.3 (−1.5)	32.5 (0.3)	38.3 (3.5)	42.9 (6.1)	46.8 (8.2)	45.8 (7.7)	40.7 (4.8)	35.2 (1.8)	30.8 (−0.7)	27.4 (−2.6)	35.4 (1.9)
Mean minimum °F (°C)	16.3 (−8.7)	17.6 (−8.0)	21.7 (−5.7)	25.6 (−3.6)	29.3 (−1.5)	34.5 (1.4)	38.8 (3.8)	38.3 (3.5)	32.2 (0.1)	26.1 (−3.3)	21.2 (−6.0)	15.9 (−8.9)	10.4 (−12.0)
Record low °F (°C)	−6 (−21)	−5 (−21)	6 (−14)	15 (−9)	23 (−5)	29 (−2)	30 (−1)	32 (0)	26 (−3)	17 (−8)	1 (−17)	−4 (−20)	−6 (−21)
Average precipitation inches (mm)	11.25 (286)	7.80 (198)	8.59 (218)	6.33 (161)	4.39 (112)	2.90 (74)	0.68 (17)	0.66 (17)	2.23 (57)	6.06 (154)	10.75 (273)	12.44 (316)	74.08 (1,882)
Average snowfall inches (cm)	24.3 (62)	17.5 (44)	13.0 (33)	2.9 (7.4)	0.2 (0.51)	0.0 (0.0)	0.0 (0.0)	0.0 (0.0)	0.0 (0.0)	0.1 (0.25)	7.6 (19)	19.6 (50)	85.2 (216)
Average precipitation days (≥ 0.01 in)	18.8	16.3	19.6	18.4	15.4	10.6	3.6	3.7	6.7	13.8	18.8	18.9	164.6
Average snowy days (≥ 0.1 in)	5.8	5.6	4.9	2.1	0.3	0.0	0.0	0.0	0.0	0.1	3.0	6.2	28
Source: NOAA
