= First Evangelical Church of Albany =

Historic church in Oregon, United States

- U.S. National Register of Historic Places
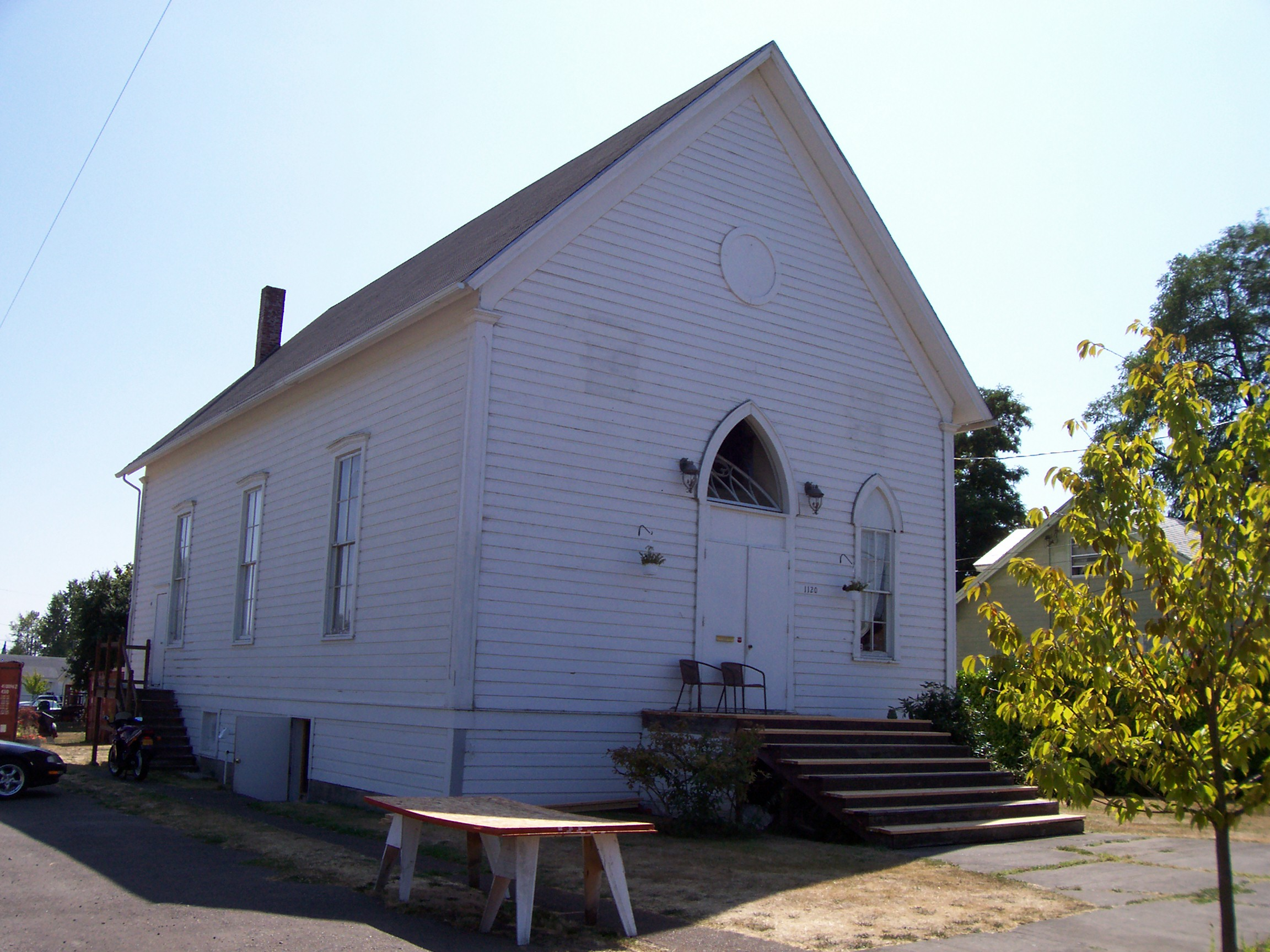

- Location within Oregon Location within the United States
- Location: 1120 SW 12 Ave., Albany, Oregon
- Coordinates: 44°37′38″N 123°6′52″W
- Area: less than one acre
- Built: 1875
- Architectural style: Gothic Revival
- NRHP reference No.: 84003030
- Added to NRHP: August 1, 1984

First Evangelical Church of Albany (Albany Open Bible Standard Church) is a historic church at 1120 SW 12 Avenue in Albany, Oregon.

It was built in 1875 and added to the National Register in 1984.
