= Albany Monteith Historic District =

Historic district in Oregon, United States

- Monteith Historic District
- U.S. National Register of Historic Places
- U.S. Historic district
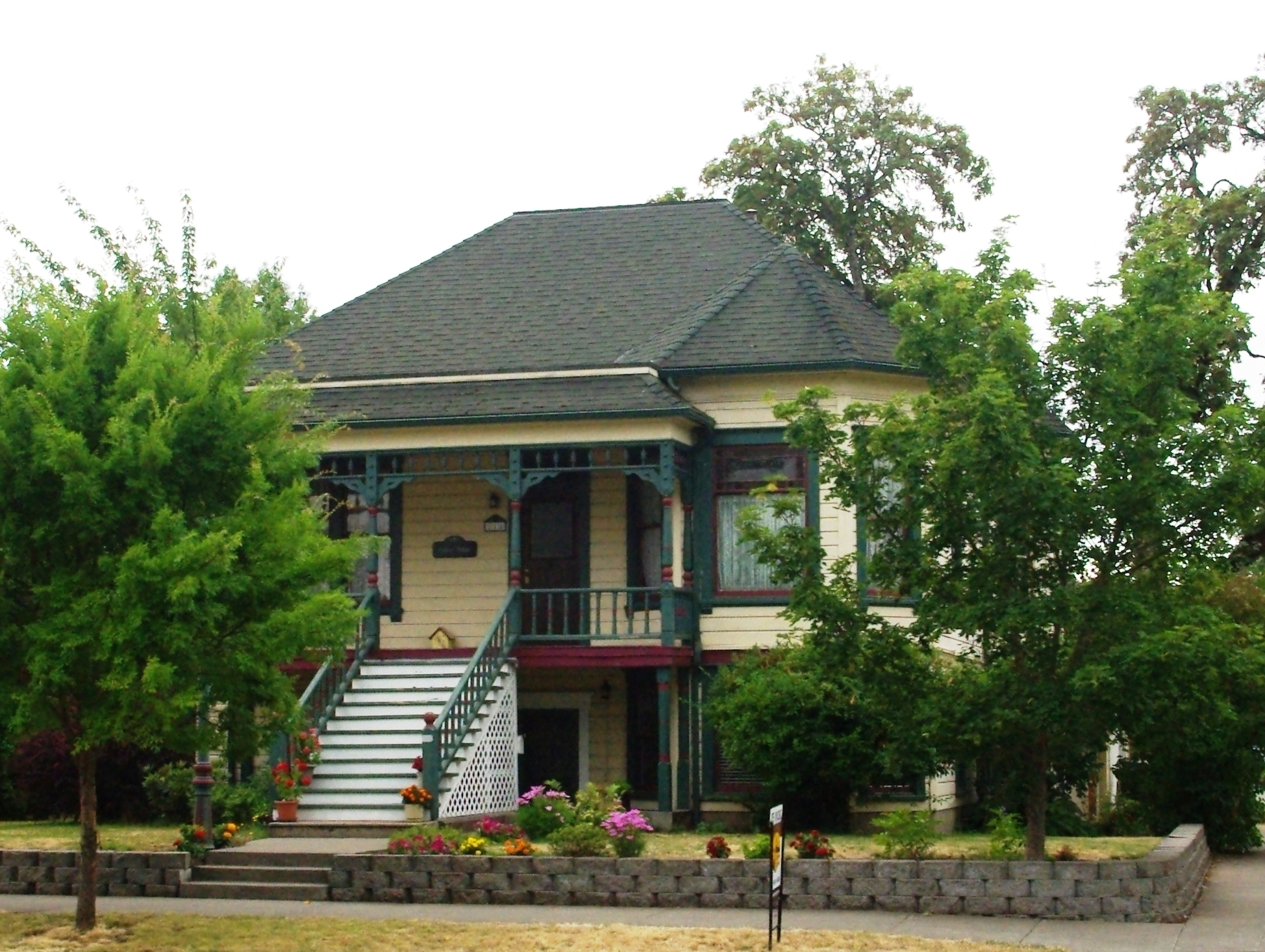

- Location within Oregon Location within the United States
- Location: Roughly bounded by 2nd, Lyon, 12th and Elm Sts. (original); Elm St. SW to Calapooia and 19th Ave. SW to 11th and 12th Aves. SW (increase), Albany, Oregon
- Coordinates: 44°37′55″N 123°6′31″W
- Built: 1851
- Architect: Multiple
- Architectural style: Bungalow/Craftsman, Late Victorian, Transitional Box
- NRHP reference No.: 80003341 (original); 08001017 (increase)

Significant dates
- Added to NRHP: February 29, 1980
- Boundary increase: November 13, 2008

The Albany Monteith Historic District, also known as Monteith Historic District, in Albany, Oregon, United States, was listed on the National Register of Historic Places (NRHP) in 1980. It includes the Alfred Dawson House, which is separately listed on the NRHP. The district was expanded in 2008.

== History ==
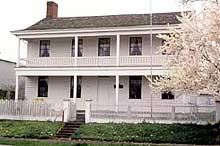
Thomas and Walter Monteith House

The Monteith District, located on the west side of downtown Albany, is named after Walter and Thomas Monteith, the founders of Albany. After arriving in Oregon from New York in 1847, the Monteith brothers completed the first frame house in Albany in 1849, which now serves as a museum and is said to be the most authentically restored Pioneer Era home in Oregon. Much of the earlier history centers around the Monteith House.

The Monteith district contains a number of churches. A former United Presbyterian Church, now known as "Whitespires", is located at the corner of Washington and Fifth. It was built in 1891 and is noted for its stained glass windows and Carpenter Gothic details. Its spire is the highest point in Albany.

In 1851, the Monteith family built and owned the Magnolia Flouring Mills along the Calapooia River. With the mill in operation, the first non-native boat ever to travel the upper Willamette River, the Multnomah, arrived in Albany, thereby increasing Albany's shipping potential for the manufacturing and farming industries.

The Monteith Historic District was placed on the National Register of Historic Places on February 29, 1980. The time period of significance for all of Albany's historic districts was expanded in 2000 from 1849 to 1915 to 1849 to 1945 to capture resources and architectural styles constructed between 1915 and 1945 that reflect the growth and development of Albany. The Monteith District was expanded in November 2008 to add 78 properties on the southwest corner of the original boundary to include a cohesive collection of early to mid-twentieth century residential buildings. Many distinct architectural styles grace the district. Included are Federal, Craftsman, Classical Revival, Gothic Revival, Italianate, Queen Anne, French Second Empire, Stick, Eastlake, Colonial Revival, Rural Vernacular, Transitional Box, Bungalow, American Renaissance, Depression/World War II Cottages, and eclectic hybrids that combine elements of these styles.

== Notable structures ==
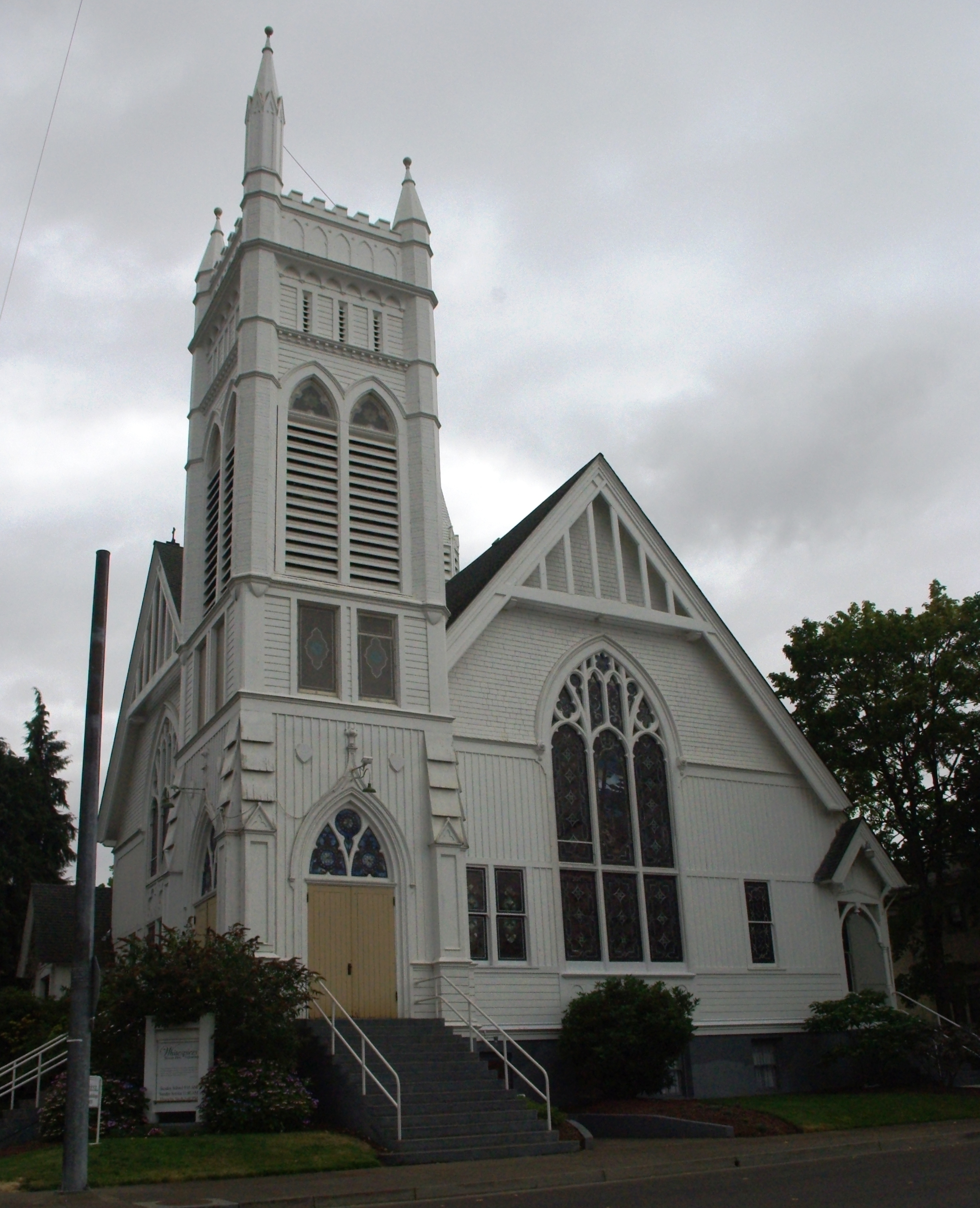
Whitespires Church in Albany's Monteith District

The Monteith Historic District is home to many different buildings of interest, including the Monteith House located at 518 Second Avenue, which now used as a museum. It is owned by the City of Albany, and the non-profit Monteith Historic Society provides financial and volunteer resources for its maintenance, restoration and operation. Another notable structure is the Breckenridge House at 1122 Ferry Street SW.
