= United Presbyterian Church and Rectory (Albany, Oregon) =

Historic church in Oregon, United States

- U.S. National Register of Historic Places
- U.S. Historic district – Contributing property
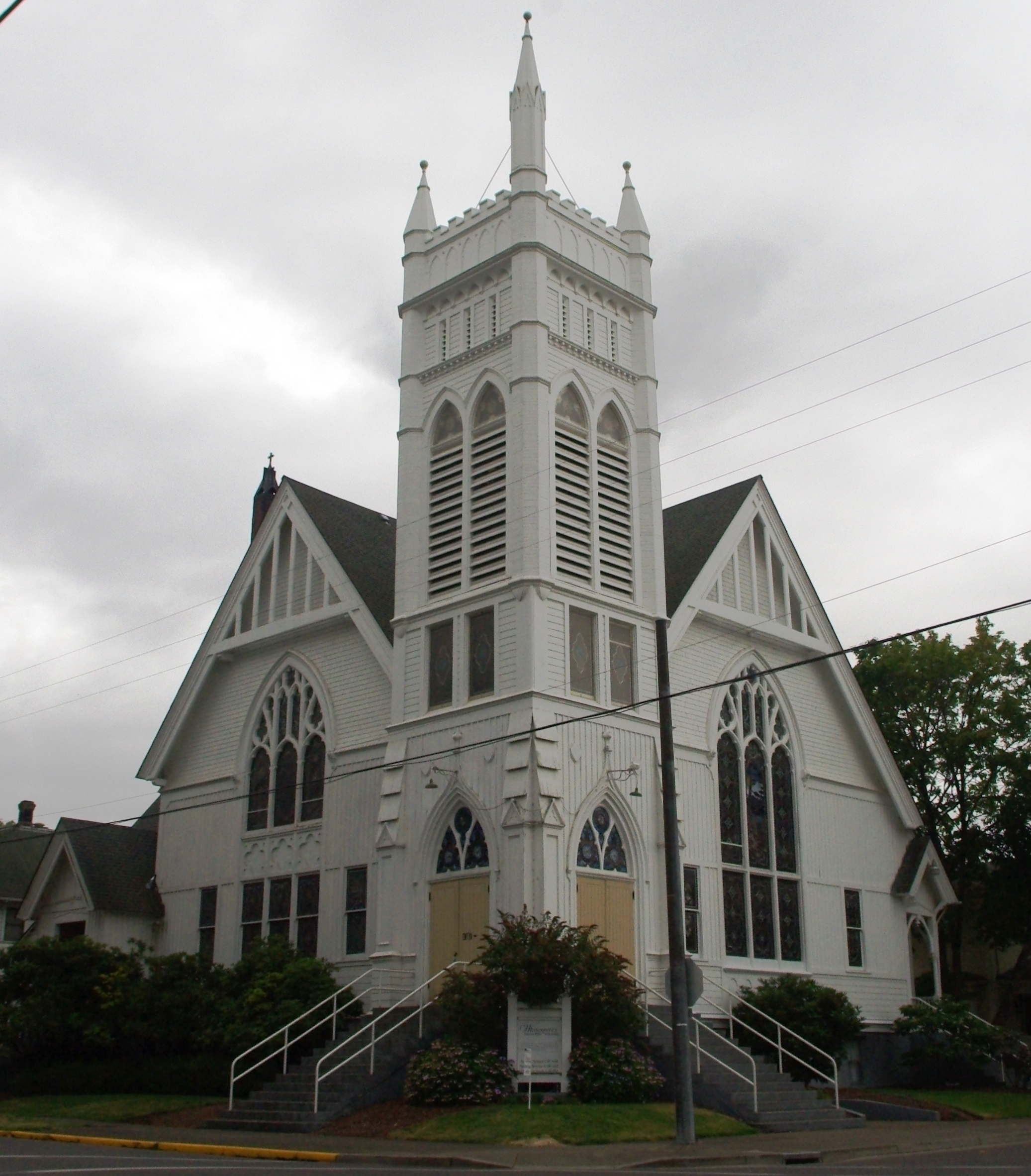
- Church in 2009
- Location: 510 SW 5th Ave., Albany, Oregon
- Coordinates: 44°38′0.3″N 123°6′34.5″W
- Built: 1891
- Architect: Walter D. Pugh, H. C. Chamberlain
- Architectural style: Carpenter Gothic
- Part of: Monteith Historic District (ID80003341)
- NRHP reference No.: 79002111
- Added to NRHP: April 18, 1979

The Albany Presbyterian Church and Rectory, also known as Whitespires, is a historic church building in Albany, Oregon, United States. It was built in 1891 in the Carpenter Gothic style. It was listed on the National Register of Historic Places (NRHP) in 1979. Although individually listed in the NRHP, it is located within the Monteith Historic District.

Whitespires houses a Kimball pipe organ that was installed in 1906.

The building is currently the home of the Whitespires Berean Bible Fellowship, also known as Berean Fundamental Church of Albany.

The present-day United Presbyterian congregation in Albany (affiliated with the Presbyterian Church (U.S.A.)) gathers in a 1913 church known as the Stone Church.
