= H. S. M. Spielman House =

Historic house in Nebraska, United States

- U.S. National Register of Historic Places
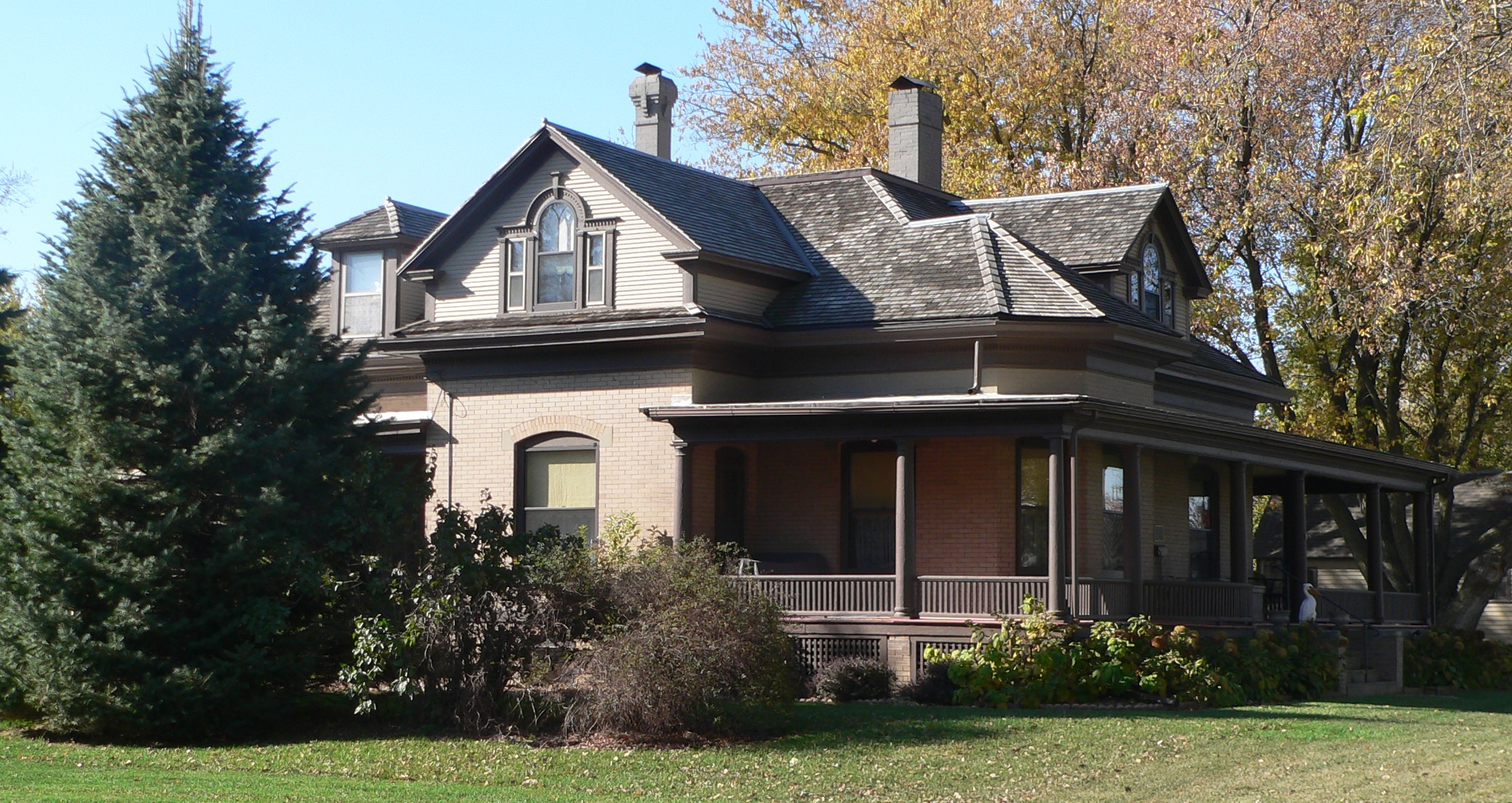

- Location within Nebraska Location within the United States
- Location: 1103 I St., Tekamah, Nebraska
- Coordinates: 41°46′24″N 96°13′6″W
- Area: less than one acre
- Built: 1906
- Built by: Bramhill, I.N.; Matthew, Clint
- Architectural style: Classical Revival, Queen Anne, vernacular Queen Anne
- NRHP reference No.: 86001713
- Added to NRHP: July 17, 1986

The H. S. M. Spielman House, at 1103 I St. in Tekamah, Nebraska, is a historic house that was built in 1906. It has also been known as the Chamberlain House and has been denoted NeHBS #BT06-2. It was listed on the National Register of Historic Places in 1986; the listing included three contributing buildings.

It is significant for association with H. S. M. Spielman (1836–1916), a successful Burt County farmer, who retired from farming to live in this house in 1906, and for its architecture (vernacular Queen Anne, with Neoclassical Revival details).
