= George Earle Chamberlain House (Albany, Oregon) =

Historic house in Oregon, United States

- U.S. National Register of Historic Places
- U.S. Historic district – Contributing property
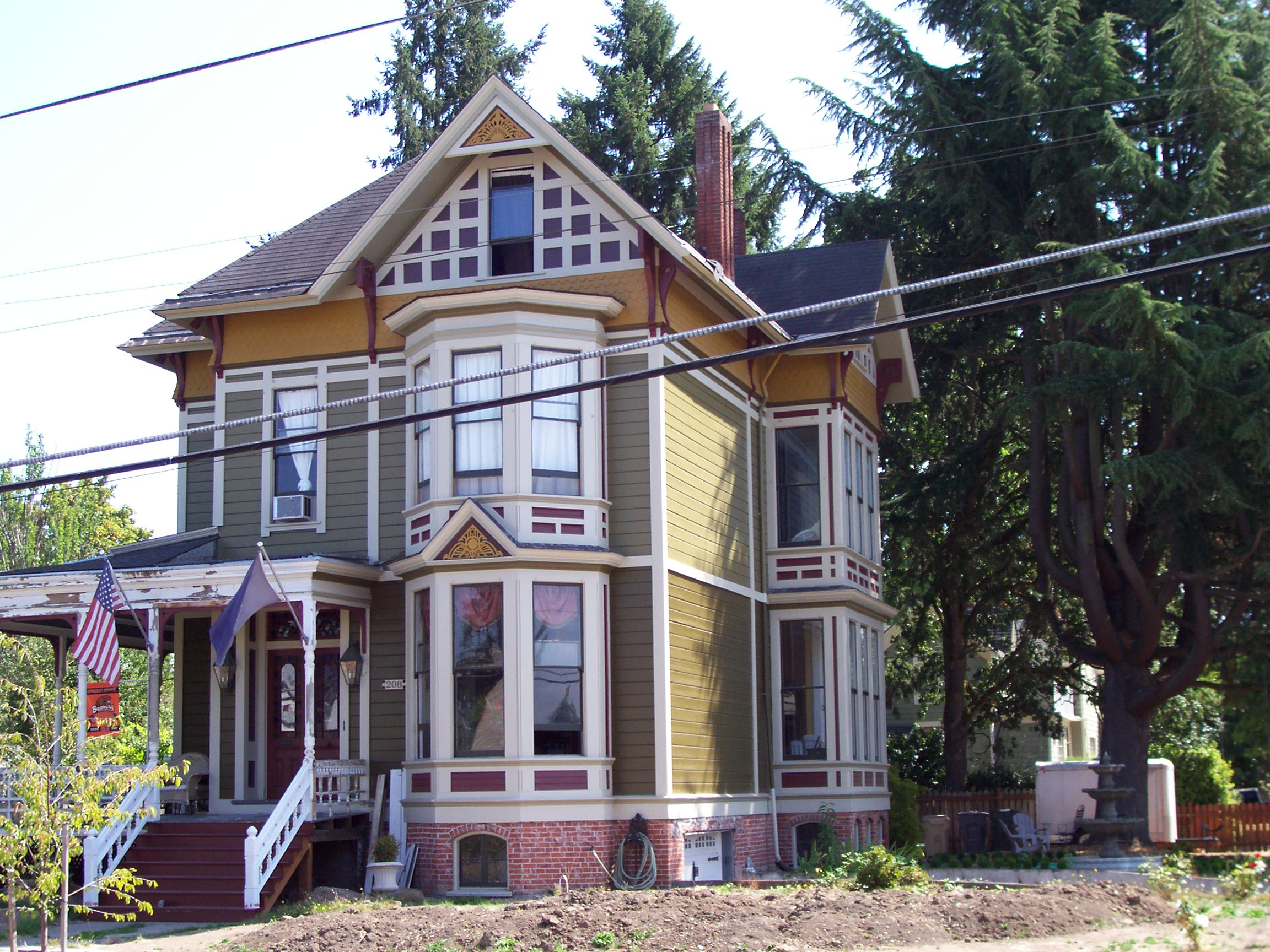
- The house in 2009

- Location within the United States Location within Oregon
- Location: 208 SE 7th Avenue; Albany, Oregon
- Coordinates: 44°37′58″N 123°06′08″W
- Built: c. 1880
- Built by: Turrell
- Architectural style: Queen Anne
- Part of: Hackleman Historic District (ID82003735)
- NRHP reference No.: 80003339
- Added to NRHP: February 22, 1980

The George Earle Chamberlain House is a historic house in Albany, Oregon, United States.

Governor George Earle Chamberlain's house was entered on the National Register of Historic Places in 1980.

== See also ==
- National Register of Historic Places listings in Linn County, Oregon
- George Earle Chamberlain House (Portland, Oregon)
