= Boston Flour Mill =

- U.S. National Register of Historic Places
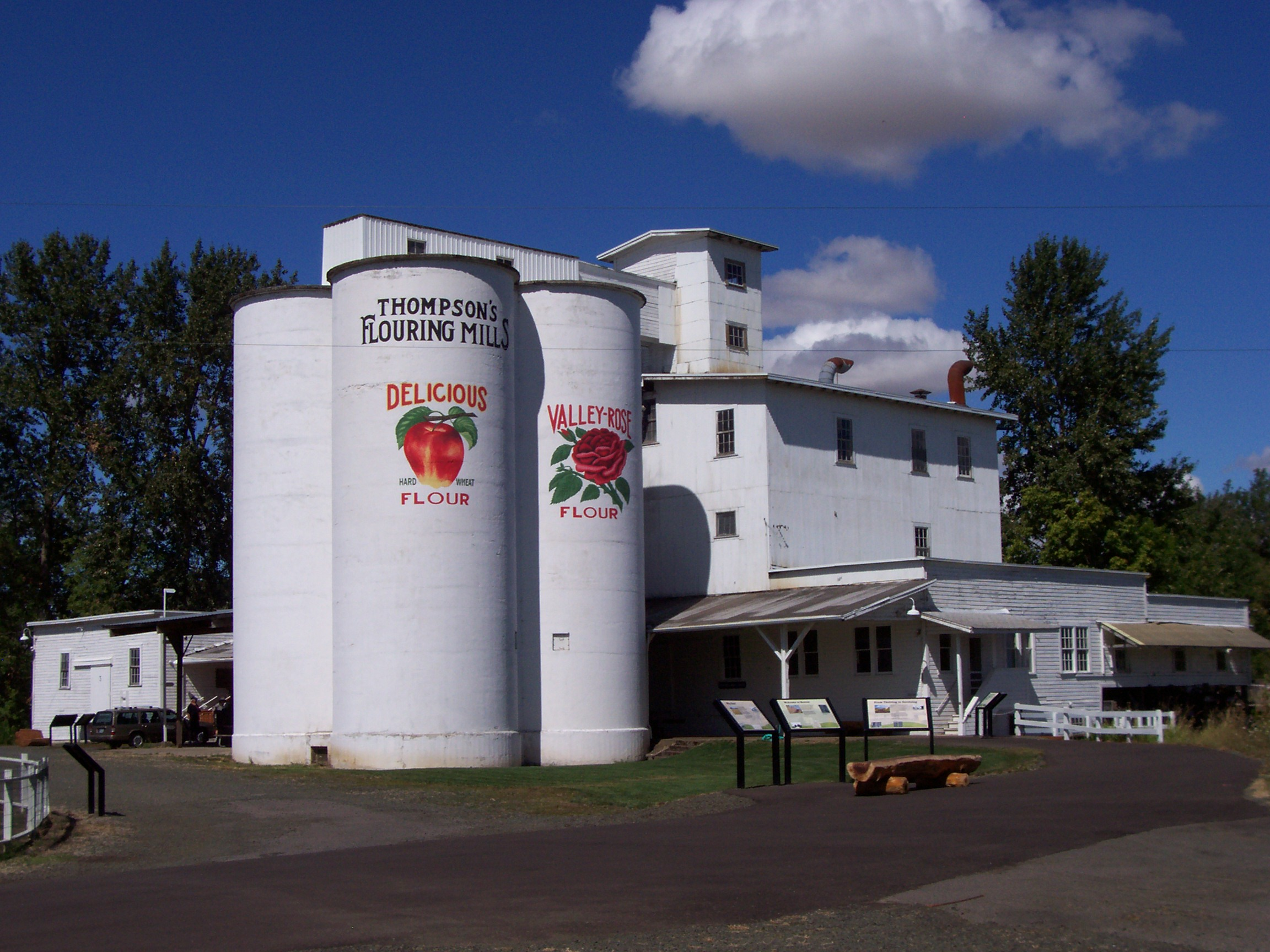

- Location within Oregon Location within the United States
- Nearest city: Shedd, Oregon
- Coordinates: 44°27′41″N 123°4′47″W
- Built: 1863
- Architect: Richard C. Finley
- Architectural style: Queen Anne
- NRHP reference No.: 79002117
- Added to NRHP: August 21, 1979

Boston Flour Mill is a historic gristmill in Shedd, Oregon, United States.

It was built in 1863 and added to the National Register of Historic Places in 1979. It is part of the Thompson's Mills State Heritage Site.

The mill has been the site of field schools of both the historic preservation program and the archaeology program of the University of Oregon, in 2003 and 2005 respectively.
