= Thomas and Walter Monteith House =

Historic house in Oregon, United States

- U.S. National Register of Historic Places
- U.S. Historic district – Contributing property
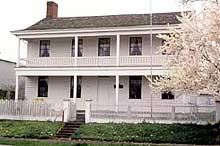
- Location: 518 W 2nd Ave; Albany, Oregon
- Coordinates: 44°38′9.1″N 123°6′37.″W
- Built: 1849
- Architectural style: Federal
- Part of: Monteith Historic District (ID80003341)
- NRHP reference No.: 75001586
- Added to NRHP: 1975

Thomas and Walter Monteith House, also known as the Monteith House Museum, was the first frame house built in Albany, Oregon, United States. It was built by Walter and Thomas Monteith in 1848–1850. All the house's original boards are hand-hewn due to lack of availability of steam-powered buzzsaws at that time. Originally the home served as a combination dwelling and store, but soon became the residence of Thomas and Christine (Dunbar) Monteith. Described architecturally as "Rural Vernacular / Pre-Classic Revival," the house was extensively remodeled in 1855 and 1880, moved 50 feet west in 1901, and in 1922 again remodeled, such that the structure little resembled the original construction. The house was placed on the National Register of Historic Places in 1975. Beginning in 1982 the house has been a museum highlighting the Monteiths' contributions to the area's community. "Living history" events are periodically given at the museum.
