= Chamberlain-Bordeau House =

Historic house in Massachusetts, United States

- U.S. National Register of Historic Places
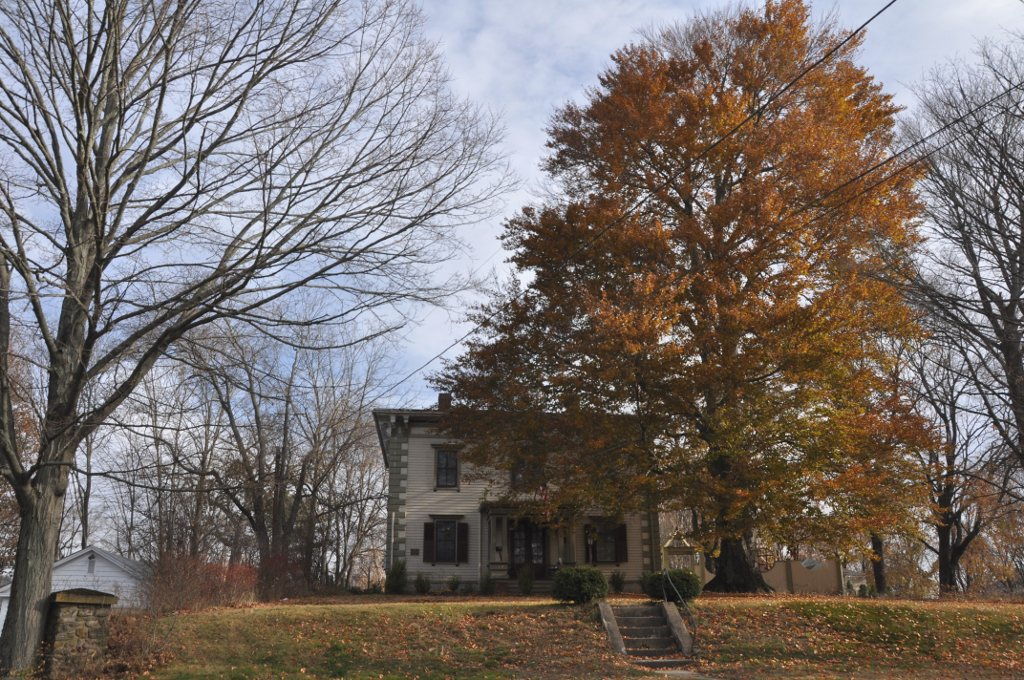

- Location within Massachusetts Location within the United States
- Location: 718 Main St., Southbridge, Massachusetts
- Coordinates: 42°4′49″N 72°2′35″W
- Area: less than one acre
- Architectural style: Italianate
- MPS: Southbridge MRA
- NRHP reference No.: 89000569
- Added to NRHP: June 22, 1989

The Chamberlain-Bordeau House is a historic house at 718 Main Street in Southbridge, Massachusetts. Built sometime between 1855 and 1870, it is one of the best preserved Italianate houses in the city. It was listed on the National Register of Historic Places in 1989.

== Description and history ==
The Chamberlain-Bordeau House is located west of downtown Southbridge, on the north side of Main Street (Massachusetts Route 131) near its junction with Sayles Street. It is a somewhat boxy two-story wood-frame structure, with a shallow pitch hip roof and clapboarded exterior. The roof has deep eaves with paired Italianate brackets., and the building corners have wooden quoin blocks. The main entrance is sheltered by a hip-roof portico supported by grouped columns with brackets forming an arch. Windows are rectangular sash, with projecting window caps.

The land on which the house stands originally belonged to the Plimpton family, who were among Southbridge's first settlers. A Plimpton house, differing in placement and orientation, is recorded as standing on this property in an 1855 map. This house was built sometime between 1855 and 1870 for Captain John Chamberlain, an insurance agent. In the 1890s it was acquired by Gilbert Bordeau, a box maker, who owned it until 1920. At the time of its construction it was the only house on the north side of that section of Main Street; development of the rest of the immediate area followed in the next few decades.

== See also ==
- National Register of Historic Places listings in Southbridge, Massachusetts
- National Register of Historic Places listings in Worcester County, Massachusetts
