= Shedd, Oregon =

Unincorporated community in the state of Oregon, United States

- Census-designated place
- Location within Oregon Location within the United States
- Coordinates: 44°27′29″N 123°06′43″W
- Country: United States
- State: Oregon
- County: Linn

Area
  - Total: 1.51 sq mi (3.91 km^{2})
  - Land: 1.51 sq mi (3.91 km^{2})
  - Water: 0 sq mi (0.00 km^{2})
- Elevation: 262 ft (80 m)

Population (2020)
  - Total: 213
  - Density: 141.3/sq mi (54.54/km^{2})
- Time zone: UTC-8 (Pacific (PST))
  - Summer (DST): UTC-7 (PDT)
- ZIP code: 97377
- Area code: 541 / 458
- FIPS code: 41-66900
- GNIS feature ID: 2584423

Shedd is an unincorporated community and census-designated place (CDP) in Linn County, Oregon, United States, on Oregon Route 99E. As of the 2020 census, Shedd had a population of 213.

== History ==
In 1858, a community and gristmill was established about a mile and a half east of the present town of Shedd and called "Boston", probably because one of the founders came from Boston, Massachusetts. Boston was platted in 1861 with a New England–style town square. The town became a stagecoach stop, and "Boston Mills" post office was established in 1869. Efforts to get the Oregon and California Railroad, which was being built south from Albany, to come through Boston Mills were unsuccessful. The railroad was instead built through the nearby land donated by Civil War veteran Captain Frank Shedd, and "Shedd's Station" was created in 1871. The post office was moved soon after. Many of Boston's buildings, though not the mill itself nor the Farwell DLC homestead, were moved west to the new Shedd's Station to be near the railroad. In 1899, the railroad changed the name of the station to "Shedd", but the name of the post office did not change until 1915.

East of Shedd at the former site of Boston Mills, on the Calapooia River, is the National Register of Historic Places-listed Boston Flour Mill (aka Thompson's Flouring Mill), Oregon's oldest continuously operating water-powered mill, part of Thompson's Mills State Heritage Site. It is one of the four remaining gristmills in the state, and one of only two mills still in operation.

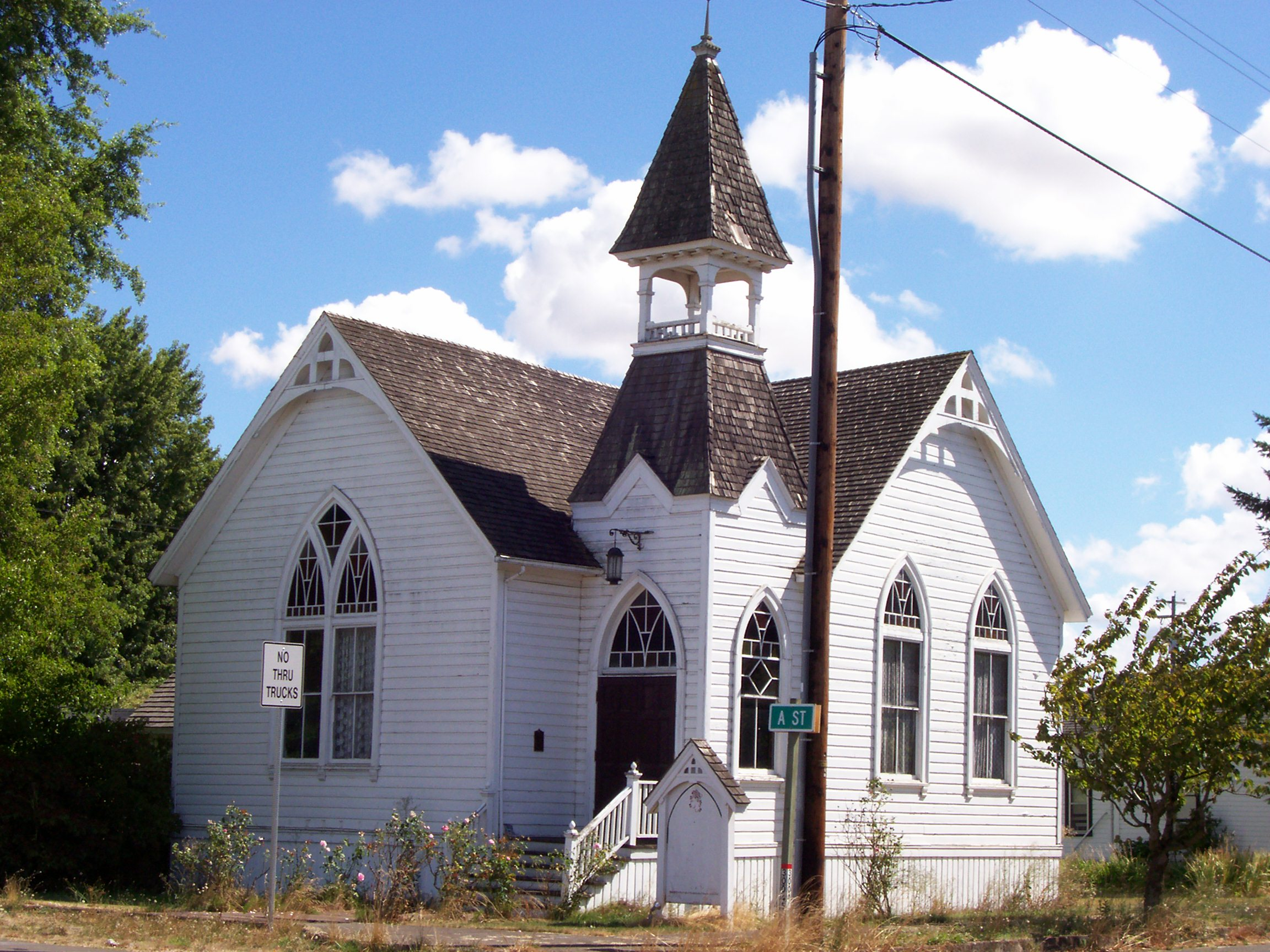
United Presbyterian Church in Shedd, listed on the National Register of Historic Places

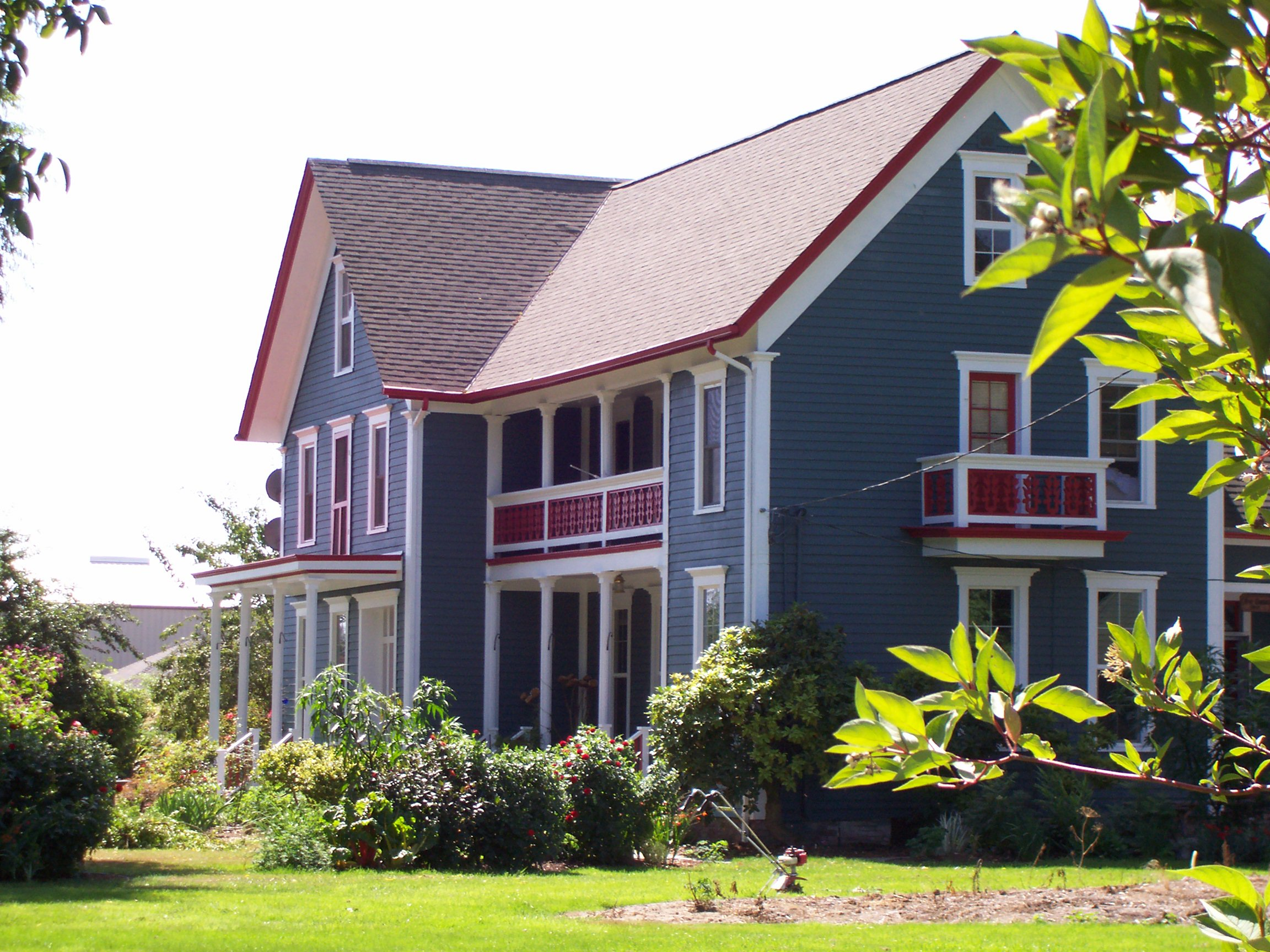
Porter-Brasfield House, listed on the National Register of Historic Places

== Geography ==
Shedd is in western Linn County in the Willamette River valley, with Shedd Slough, a tributary of the Calapooia River, flowing northwards on the east side of town. Oregon Route 99E passes through the center of town, leading north 12 miles (19 km) to Albany and south 5 miles (8 km) to Halsey.

According to the U.S. Census Bureau, the Shedd CDP has an area of 1.5 square miles (3.9 km^{2}), all of it recorded as land.

== Demographics ==
Historical population
Census	Pop.	Note	%±
2020	213		—
U.S. Decennial Census
