= Harrisburg, Oregon =

- City
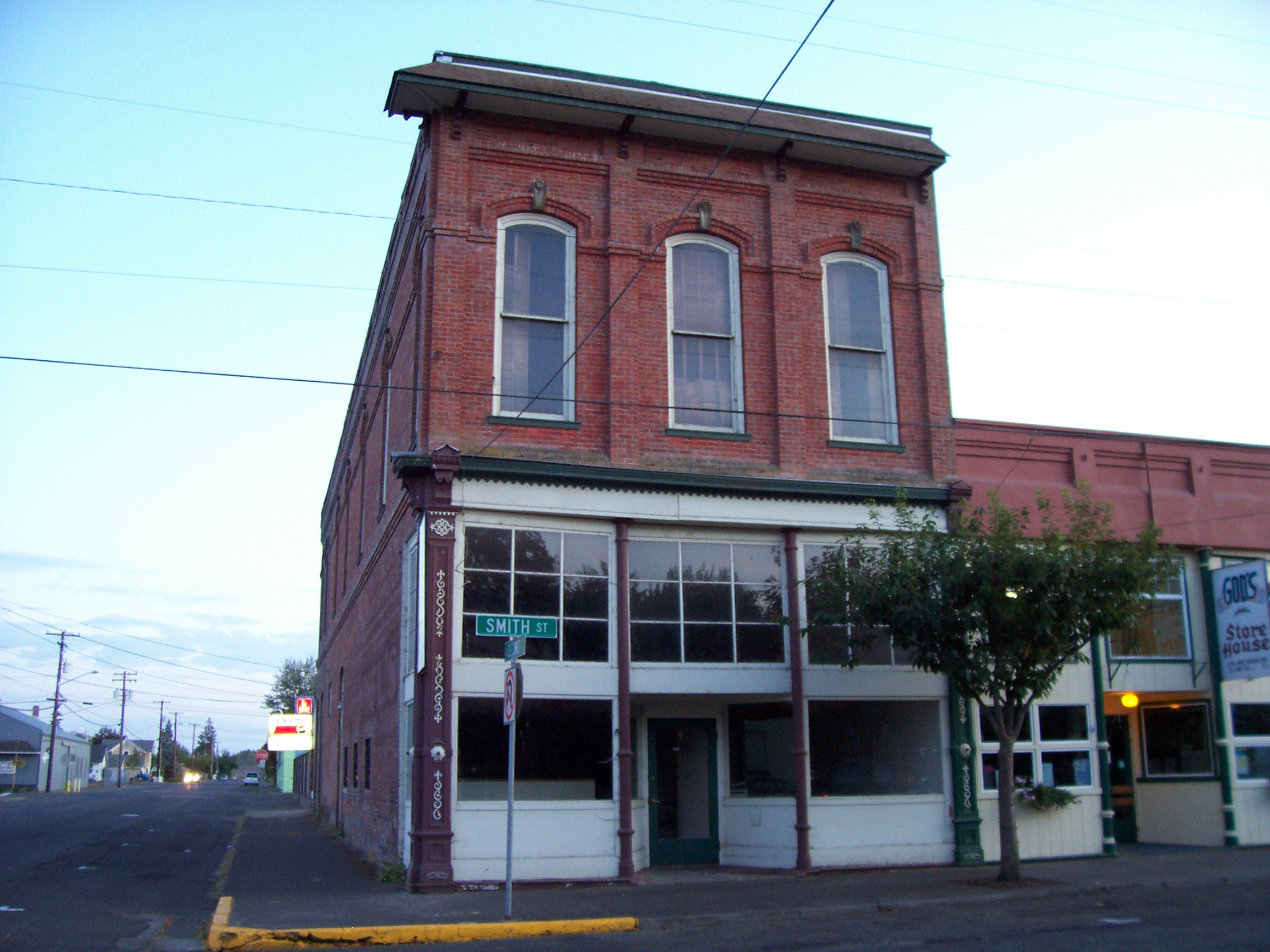
- Odd Fellows Hall in the city

- Location in Oregon
- Coordinates: 44°16′18″N 123°09′56″W
- Country: United States
- State: Oregon
- County: Linn
- Incorporated: 1866

Government
  - Mayor: Robert Duncan

Area
  - Total: 1.45 sq mi (3.76 km^{2})
  - Land: 1.40 sq mi (3.62 km^{2})
  - Water: 0.050 sq mi (0.13 km^{2})
- Elevation: 315 ft (96 m)

Population (2020)
  - Total: 3,652
  - Density: 2,611.0/sq mi (1,008.11/km^{2})
- Time zone: UTC-8 (Pacific)
  - Summer (DST): UTC-7 (Pacific)
- ZIP code: 97446
- Area code: 541
- FIPS code: 41-32550
- GNIS feature ID: 2410707
- Website: ci.harrisburg.or.us

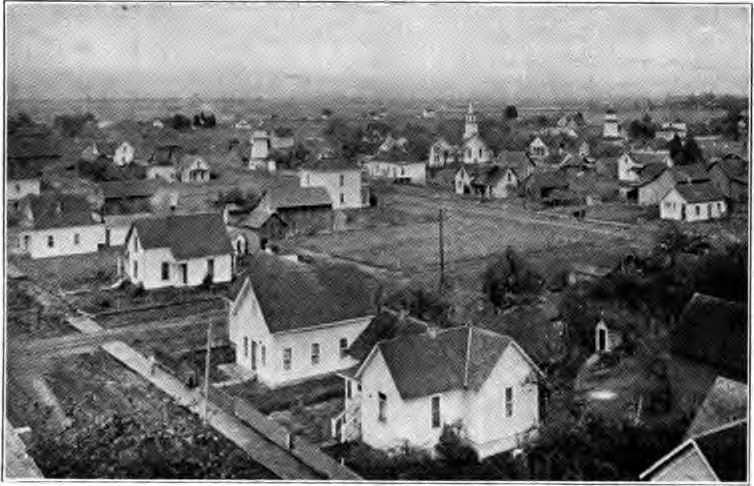
Harrisburg in 1920

Harrisburg is a city in Linn County, Oregon, United States. As of the 2020 census, Harrisburg had a population of 3,652.

== Geography ==
According to the United States Census Bureau, the city has a total area of 1.45 square miles (3.76 km^{2}), of which 1.40 square miles (3.63 km^{2}) is land and 0.05 square miles (0.13 km^{2}) is water.

== Demographics ==
Historical population
Census	Pop.	Note	%±
1880	422		—
1890	413		−2.1%
1900	502		21.5%
1910	453		−9.8%
1920	573		26.5%
1930	575		0.3%
1940	622		8.2%
1950	862		38.6%
1960	939		8.9%
1970	1,311		39.6%
1980	1,881		43.5%
1990	1,939		3.1%
2000	2,795		44.1%
2010	3,567		27.6%
2020	3,652		2.4%
U.S. Decennial Census

=== 2020 census ===
As of the 2020 census, Harrisburg had a population of 3,652. The median age was 37.0 years. 25.3% of residents were under the age of 18 and 12.6% of residents were 65 years of age or older. For every 100 females there were 99.7 males, and for every 100 females age 18 and over there were 96.9 males age 18 and over.

0% of residents lived in urban areas, while 100.0% lived in rural areas.

There were 1,320 households in Harrisburg, of which 37.0% had children under the age of 18 living in them. Of all households, 57.1% were married-couple households, 15.8% were households with a male householder and no spouse or partner present, and 19.5% were households with a female householder and no spouse or partner present. About 18.3% of all households were made up of individuals and 7.8% had someone living alone who was 65 years of age or older.

There were 1,365 housing units, of which 3.3% were vacant. Among occupied housing units, 74.8% were owner-occupied and 25.2% were renter-occupied. The homeowner vacancy rate was 0.5% and the rental vacancy rate was 4.3%.

Racial composition as of the 2020 census
Race	Number	Percent
White	3,040	83.2%
Black or African American	9	0.2%
American Indian and Alaska Native	45	1.2%
Asian	19	0.5%
Native Hawaiian and Other Pacific Islander	9	0.2%
Some other race	160	4.4%
Two or more races	370	10.1%
Hispanic or Latino (of any race)	398	10.9%

=== 2010 census ===
As of the census of 2010, there were 3,567 people, 1,238 households, and 966 families living in the city. The population density was 2,547.9 inhabitants per square mile (983.7/km^{2}). There were 1,318 housing units at an average density of 941.4 per square mile (363.5/km^{2}). The racial makeup of the city was 91.3% White, 0.5% African American, 1.0% Native American, 0.3% Asian, 0.1% Pacific Islander, 3.2% from other races, and 3.4% from two or more races. Hispanic or Latino of any race were 8.0% of the population.

There were 1,238 households, of which 44.3% had children under the age of 18 living with them, 60.3% were married couples living together, 12.8% had a female householder with no husband present, 4.8% had a male householder with no wife present, and 22.0% were non-families. 17.2% of all households were made up of individuals, and 5.8% had someone living alone who was 65 years of age or older. The average household size was 2.88 and the average family size was 3.21.

The median age in the city was 33.7 years. 30.4% of residents were under the age of 18; 7.3% were between the ages of 18 and 24; 29.5% were from 25 to 44; 24.2% were from 45 to 64; and 8.6% were 65 years of age or older. The gender makeup of the city was 49.4% male and 50.6% female.

=== 2000 census ===
As of the census of 2000, there were 2,795 people, 989 households, and 751 families living in the city. The population density was 1,748.8 inhabitants per square mile (675.2/km^{2}). There were 1,038 housing units at an average density of 649.5 per square mile (250.8/km^{2}). The racial makeup of the city was 92.99% White, 0.11% African American, 1.22% Native American, 0.57% Asian, 2.86% from other races, and 2.25% from two or more races. Hispanic or Latino of any race were 5.69% of the population.

There were 989 households, out of which 43.2% had children under the age of 18 living with them, 60.0% were married couples living together, 11.0% had a female householder with no husband present, and 24.0% were non-families. 17.6% of all households were made up of individuals, and 6.1% had someone living alone who was 65 years of age or older. The average household size was 2.83 and the average family size was 3.19.

In the city, the population was spread out, with 31.4% under the age of 18, 9.2% from 18 to 24, 32.5% from 25 to 44, 18.1% from 45 to 64, and 8.8% who were 65 years of age or older. The median age was 31 years. For every 100 females, there were 104.0 males. For every 100 females age 18 and over, there were 99.3 males.

The median income for a household in the city was $40,106, and the median income for a family was $41,953. Males had a median income of $34,509 versus $25,298 for females. The per capita income for the city was $15,822. About 6.4% of families and 9.7% of the population were below the poverty line, including 11.8% of those under age 18 and 6.0% of those age 65 or over.
