= List of museums in Oregon =

This list of museums in Oregon encompasses museums defined for this context as institutions (including nonprofit organizations, government entities, and private businesses) that collect and care for objects of cultural, artistic, scientific, or historical interest and make their collections or related exhibits available for public viewing. Museums that exist only in cyberspace (i.e., virtual museums) are not included. Lists of Oregon institutions which are not museums are noted in the "See also" section, below.

== Main list ==
Name	Community	County	Region	Type	Summary
A. C. Gilbert's Discovery Village	Salem	Marion	Willamette Valley	Children's	Hands-on museum that displays several inventions by Alfred Carlton Gilbert inventor of the Erector Set; has world's largest Erector Set tower at 52 feet (16 m)
A. R. Bowman Memorial Museum	Prineville	Crook	Central	History - Local	Covers Crook County history, including the City of Prineville Railroad, the local timber industry, and a military exhibit
Agness-Illahe Museum	Agness	Curry	Coast	History - Local	Operated seasonally by the Curry Historical Society
Albany Historic Carousel and Museum	Albany	Linn	Willamette Valley	Commodity - Carousel	Website, formerly the Dentzel American Carousel Museum, historic Dentzel Carousel Company under restoration, memorabilia
Albany Regional Museum	Albany	Linn	Willamette Valley	History - Local	Website; local history museum in an 1887 Italianate Victorian building
Alsea Bay Historic Interpretive Center	Waldport	Lincoln	Coast	Transportation	State park with exhibits about the Alsea Bridge and the building of bridges in Oregon, area transportation, Native Americans
Anderson Homestead	The Dalles	Wasco	Mt. Hood/ The Gorge	Historic house	1895 homestead consisting of Swedish log house, granary, and barn; across the street from the Fort Dalles Museum, which provides tours of this homestead
Antique Powerland Museums	Brooks	Marion	Willamette Valley	Railroad / Machinery	See "Museums and organizations encompassed by Antique Powerland Museums" section below; Exhibits and demonstrates steam powered equipment, antique farm machinery and implements; includes Oregon Electric Railway Museum and 13 other museums on site
Applegate Pioneer Museum	Veneta	Lane	Willamette Valley	History - Local	West Lane history in pictures and memorabilia
Applegate Trail Interpretive Center	Sunny Valley	Josephine	Southern	History - Local	Includes pioneer artifacts, impact of gold mining, the stagecoach and railroads
The Art Gym	Marylhurst	Clackamas	Portland Metro	Art	Contemporary arts exhibition space at Marylhurst University
Asher Car Museum	Fossil	Wheeler	Eastern	Transportation - Automobile	Information; Opened about 1970;, may be closed, no current information
Ashland Historic Railroad Museum	Ashland	Jackson	Southern	Railroad	
Astoria Children's Museum	Astoria	Clatsop	Coast	Children's	May be closed - no current information
Astoria Column	Astoria	Clatsop	Coast	History - Local	125 foot column tower to climb, scenes of Oregon history on its exterior
Astoria Riverfront Trolley	Astoria	Clatsop	Coast	Transportation - Trolley	
Baker Cabin	Carver	Clackamas	Portland Metro	Historic house	Only cantilevered log cabin in state (on National Register of Historic Places listings in Oregon), built 1856, open by appointment; also, 1895 Pioneer Church and antique stage coach
Baker Heritage Museum	Baker City	Baker	Eastern	History - Local	Website; rocks and crystals, local history exhibits, the restored Adler House, antique automobiles; formerly the Oregon Trail Regional Museum
Baldwin Hotel Museum	Klamath Falls	Klamath	Southern	History - Local	Local history and the studio of photographer Maud Baldwin in a four-story 1906 building; run by Klamath County Museums organization
Bandon Historical Society Museum	Bandon	Coos	Coast	History - Local	Website; local history of the area, Native American artifacts, displays on logging, fishing, cranberry farming and the 1936 fire that destroyed the city; maritime room
Barn Museum	Troutdale	Multnomah	Portland Metro	History / Farm implements	Displays farm equipment and other artifacts; exhibits on various historical topics; run by the Troutdale Historical Society
Beekman House	Jacksonville	Jackson	Southern	Historic house	Operated by the Jacksonville Heritage Society, early 20th-century period Victorian home
Benton County Historical Society and Museum	Philomath	Benton	Willamette Valley	History - Local / Natural history	Website; County history; now incorporates 60,000-items related to natural history from the former Oregon State University Horner Museum; research library; art gallery; in the 1867 Philomath College building on the National Register of Historic Places
Bohemia Gold Mining Museum	Cottage Grove	Lane	Willamette Valley	Mining	Area's gold mining history
Bonneville Dam Visitor Centers	Cascade Locks	Hood River	Portland Metro	Multiple	Tours of the powerhouse, construction of the dam, fish ladder, natural history of the river fish
Brooks Depot Museum	Brooks	Marion	Willamette Valley	History - Local	Run by the Brooks Historical Society at Antique Powerland, open the first Saturday of every month
Brunk House	Salem/Rickreall at Brunks Corner	Polk	Willamette Valley	Historic house	Operated by the Polk County Historical Society, farmstead of 1861, period furnishings of 1860–1920; occupied by the pioneer Harrison Brunk family
Burrows House	Newport	Lincoln	Coast	History - Local	website, operated by the Lincoln County Historical Society, Victorian period house with exhibits of local history
Bush Barn Art Center	Salem	Marion	Willamette Valley	Art	Located in Bush's Pasture Park, features two contemporary art galleries
Bush House Museum	Salem	Marion	Willamette Valley	Historic house	Italianate Victorian residence built in 1877–78; vintage fittings and furnishings, including original wallpapers and ornate marble fireplaces; located in Bush's Pasture Park
Camp White Military Museum	White City	Jackson	Southern	Military	Located in the VA Southern Oregon Rehabilitation Center & Clinic, history of Camp White, an Army training base in WWII
Canby Depot Museum	Canby	Clackamas	Portland Metro	Railroad / History - Local	Area history and railroad history, located in a former train depot, operated by the Canby Historical Society
Cannon Beach History Center & Museum	Cannon Beach	Clatsop	Coast	History - Local	Website; collection includes cannon, Tillamook Rock Lighthouse model, Native American longhouse
Canyon Life Museum	Mill City	Linn	Willamette Valley	History - Local	Life, logging, mining and railroad history in North Santiam Canyon; photographs; research library; Run by North Santiam Historical Society
Cape Blanco Lighthouse	Gold Beach	Curry	Coast	Maritime	Mid 19th-century working lighthouse and museum
Cape Meares Light	Cape Meares	Tillamook	Coast	Maritime	Inactive 1890s lighthouse open for tours
Caples House Museum	Columbia	Columbia	Portland Metro	Historic house / Toys	Website; 1870 home, including a doctor's office, old-fashioned kitchen and pantry; items include antique furniture, medical instruments, Native American baskets, pioneer tools in the wash house and tool shed; a doll museum in the carriage house has two floors of dolls, toys and clothes
Cascade Locks Historical Museum	Cascade Locks	Hood River	Mt. Hood/ The Gorge	Multiple	Located in a lock tender's house, exhibits include the Cascade Locks and Canal, an Oregon Pony locomotive, Columbia Gorge Native American history and regional history
Chachalu Museum and Cultural Center	Confederated Tribes of Grand Ronde	Polk	Willamette Valley	Multiple	Chachalu tells the story of the Tribes and Bands of the Confederated Tribes of the Grand Ronde Community of Oregon and honor our Elders who kept Tribal traditions and dreams alive during the years of Termination. It is a center where the Tribe's Restoration is celebrated and our culture is being revitalized.
Chetco Valley Museum	Brookings	Curry	Coast	History - Local	Local history including logging, fishing, bulb farming, ranching, Native American artifacts; claims to have the largest Monterey Cypress Tree in Oregon; run by Curry County Historical Society
Children's Museum of Klamath Falls	Klamath Falls	Klamath	Southern	Children's	
Children's Museum of Eastern Oregon	Pendleton	Umatilla	Eastern	Children's	Website
Chinese House Railroad Museum	Echo	Umatilla	Eastern	Ethnic - Chinese American / Railroad	Artifacts of railroad history and of Chinese workers; in an original "China House" for Chinese railroad workers
Classic Aircraft Aviation Museum	Hillsboro	Washington	Portland Metro	Aviation	Restored historic aircraft, located at Hillsboro Airport
Clatskanie Castle	Clatskanie	Columbia	Portland Metro	Historic house	Also known as Flippin House, Edwardian-style house
Clatskanie Historical Museum	Clatskanie	Columbia	Portland Metro	History - Local	Operated by the Clatskanie Historical Society
Clatsop County Heritage Museum	Astoria	Clatsop	Coast	History - Local	Local history exhibits; Clatsop County Historical Society archives; Chinook and Clatsop Indian artifacts and crafts; in former Astoria City Hall
Collier Logging Museum	Chiloquin	Klamath	Southern	Industry	Located in Collier Memorial State Park, outdoor museum with a large collection of historic logging equipment and railroad
Columbia Gorge Discovery Center	The Dalles	Wasco	Mt. Hood/ The Gorge	Multiple	Website; official interpretive center for the Columbia River Gorge National Scenic Area, encompasses Wasco County Historical Museum; local history, natural history, Lewis and Clark Expedition, Ice Age exhibit
Columbia River Maritime Museum	Astoria	Clatsop	Coast	Maritime	History of the Columbia River, including four interactive and hands-on exhibits, the Lightship Columbia (a National Historic Landmark), maritime artifacts from the Pacific Northwest
Coos Art Museum	Coos Bay	Coos	Coast	Art	State's third oldest art museum; in an Art Deco post office; contemporary art collection; art classes, lectures and events
Coos County Fairgrounds Museum	Myrtle Point	Coos	Coast	History - Local	Displays include antiques, school items, photos, fine art and photography, located at the Coos County Fairgrounds
Coos County Logging Museum	Myrtle Point	Coos	Coast	Industry - Timber	Displays tableaux, pictures and artifacts about 20th-century logging; housed in an onion-shaped, shingled-dome, wooden building from the early 20th century meant to modestly replicate the Mormon Tabernacle
Coos History Museum	Coos Bay	Coos	Coast	History - Local	Website; south Oregon coast history, logging, area Native Americans, ship construction, operated by the Coos County Historical Society
Coquille River Light	Bandon	Coos	Coast	Maritime	Located in Bullards Beach State Park
Coquille Valley Museum	Coquille	Coos	Coast	History - Local	Operated by the Coquille Valley Historical Society, includes tools, photos, a turn-of-the-century printing press and type, a blacksmith forge
Cottage Grove Museum	Cottage Grove	Lane	Willamette Valley	History - Local	Lumbering, mining, agriculture, covered bridges, prints, RMS Titanic displays; in an octagon-shaped former church
Crater Lake National Park - Sinnott Memorial Observation Station		Klamath	Southern	Natural history	Geology of Crater Lake National Park
Crater Rock Museum	Central Point	Jackson	Southern	Geology	Website, rocks, minerals, gems, fossils, Native American artifacts
Creswell Historical Museum	Creswell	Lane	Willamette Valley	History - Local	Operated by the Creswell Area Historical Society in a restored 1889 Methodist Church
Crown Point Country Historical Society	Corbett	Multnomah	Portland Metro	History - Local	Website; a large classroom in the Historic Springdale School Community Center
Crown Point Vista House	Troutdale	Multnomah	Portland Metro	History - Local	Stone building with views of the Columbia River Gorge, features displays on history and geology of the Gorge and local history; in a 1916 octagonal building designed by Edgar M. Lazarus; run by the Friends of the Vista House, owned and maintained by Oregon State Parks.
Curry Historical Society Museum	Gold Beach	Curry	Coast	History - Local / Regional	Local and regional history; run by the Curry County Historical Society
Des Chutes Historical Museum	Bend	Deschutes	Central	History - Local	Exhibits include the area's prehistory, Native American tribes, explorers, pioneers, the logging industry, transportation, home life, and the United States Forest Service
DeWitt Museum	Prairie City	Grant	Eastern	History - Local / Railroad	Located in a historic train station, includes railroad period rooms displays, local history, rocks, minerals and mining exhibit
Dolly Wares Doll Museum	Florence	Lane	Coast	Toy	Collection of more than 3,000 dolls, may be closed
Dorris Ranch	Springfield	Lane	Willamette Valley	Living	Website; national historic site, working farm and public park, features 19th-century pioneer village, operated by the Willamalane Park and Recreation District
Douglas County Museum	Roseburg	Douglas	Coast	Natural history / History - Local	
Lee House Museum	Junction City	Lane	Willamette Valley	History - Local	Medical equipment and items relating to Junction City history; run by the Junction City Historical Society
Dufur Historical Society Museum	Dufur	Wasco	Mt. Hood/ The Gorge	History - Local	website, history displays in a historic log cabin, school and museum building
Eagle Point Museum	Eagle Point	Jackson	Southern	History - Local	
East Linn Museum	Sweet Home	Linn	Willamette Valley	History - Local	Collection includes logging tools, period rooms and farm tools and equipment, photographs
Eastern Oregon Fire Museum & Learning Center	La Grande	Union	Eastern	Firefighting	Former (1899–2002) fire station; exhibits on history of firefighting; firehouse culture and advances in technology; vintage fire trucks
Eastern Oregon Museum	Haines	Baker	Eastern	History - Local	Logging, mining, cowboy memorabilia, ranching, housewares, period clothing, dolls, toys, a former railroad depot and a former one-room schoolhouse
Echo Historical Museum	Echo	Umatilla	Eastern	History - Local	
Elgin Museum	Elgin	Union	Eastern	History - Local	
End of the Oregon Trail Interpretive Center	Oregon City	Clackamas	Portland Metro	History	Website; Presentations by live history Interpreters in pioneer-period clothing
Ermatinger House	Oregon City	Clackamas	Portland Metro	Historic house	1845 house, the oldest in Clackamas County
Evergreen Aviation & Space Museum	McMinnville	Yamhill	Willamette Valley	Aviation / Aerospace museum	Home of Howard Hughes' Spruce Goose, includes airplanes, aircraft engines, helicopters, a Titan II ICBM and space technology exhibits
E. W. Smith and Bill Edmondson Museum	Butte Falls	Jackson	Southern	History - Local	Operated by the Big Butte Historical Society, open by appointment
Favell Museum	Klamath Falls	Klamath	Southern	Art - Western / Ethnic - Native American	Website; Western art and Native American artifacts
FireHouse Gallery	Grants Pass	Josephine	Southern	Art	Operated by Rogue Community College, works by local, regional, national, and international emerging artists
Five Oaks Museum (formerly Washington County Museum)	Hillsboro	Washington	Portland Metro	History - Local	Portland Community College Rock Creek campus
Flavel House Museum	Astoria	Clatsop	Coast	Historic house	1886 Queen Anne style home of Captain George Flavel, river pilot, businessman; original Eastlake-influenced woodwork, period furnishings
FLIP Museum	Hillsboro	Washington	Portland Metro	Children's	Children's museum focused on art, culture, and STEM
Floed–Lane House	Roseburg	Douglas	Southern	Historic house	Mid 19th-century house, operated by the Douglas County Historical Society
Fort Clatsop National Memorial	Astoria	Clatsop	Coast	Military	Replica of original 1805–1806 winter encampment of the 33-member Lewis and Clark Expedition
Fort Dalles Museum	The Dalles	Wasco	Mt. Hood/ The Gorge	History - Local	Military, pioneer and Native American artifacts, Oregon Trail relics, early vehicles, household items, photographs; listed on the National Register of Historic Places
Fort Klamath Museum	Klamath Falls	Klamath	Southern	Fort	Eight-acre site of Fort Klamath (1863–1890), no original buildings remain; replica of the fort guardhouse contains artifacts from the fort; run by Klamath County Museums organization
Fort Rock Valley Historical Homestead Museum	Fort Rock	Lake	Southern	Open-air museum	Original pioneer buildings including a church, school, houses, homestead cabins
Fort Stevens Historical Area	Warrenton	Clatsop	Coast	Military	In Fort Stevens State Park
Fort Vancouver National Historic Site	Oregon City	Clackamas	Portland Metro	Military	Restored fort with living history demonstrations in Washington state, former residence of John McLoughlin in Oregon, Victorian period home, crafts demonstrations
Fossil Museum & Pine Creek Schoolhouse	Fossil	Wheeler	Eastern	Natural history / History - Local	
Four Rivers Cultural Center	Ontario	Malheur	Eastern	History - Local / Ethnic - Native American	Website; Local history and Native American exhibits; includes the Horace Arment Collection of artifacts from the Sioux, Navajo, Northern Paiute, Haida and earlier Native Americans
Frazier Farmstead Museum	Milton-Freewater	Umatilla	Eastern	Historic house - Farmstead	Website; 1892 farmhouse, 1918 barn, a carriage house and several other buildings
Garibaldi Museum	Garibaldi	Tillamook	Coast	Maritime	Website; focuses on 18th-century Captain Robert Gray, his historical vessels, the trade with Native Americans of the Pacific Northwest, displays include models of his two ships, reproduction of Columbia's figurehead, one wing on local history
Gilliam County Historical Museum	Condon	Gilliam	Eastern	Open-air	website, early farm equipment, Union Pacific Railroad caboose, an agricultural-machinery building, 1884 log cabin, 1910 school, 1900 tonsorial parlor, 1905 railroad depot, and early 20th-century jail, operated by the Gilliam County Historical Society
Gold Hill Historical Society Museum	Gold Hill	Jackson	Southern	History - Local	Housed in the Beeman-Martin house
Gordon House	Silverton	Marion	Willamette Valley	Historic house	Usonian house designed by Frank Lloyd Wright
Grant County Historical Museum	Canyon City	Grant	Eastern	History - Local	Website
Grants Pass Museum of Art	Grants Pass	Josephine	Southern	Art	Regional artists
Gresham History Museum	Gresham	Multnomah	Portland Metro	History - Local	History of Gresham and surrounding area; run by the Gresham Historical Society
Hallie Ford Museum of Art	Salem	Marion	Willamette Valley	Art	Part of Willamette University, collection includes Asian, European, Native American, and regional art
Hanley Farm Museum	Central Point	Jackson	Southern	Farm	Web page, operated by the Southern Oregon Historical Society, 37-acre working farm that reflects different periods of farm life
Hanthorn Cannery Museum	Astoria	Clatsop	Coast	Industry	website, local cannery and fishing industries
Harlow House Museum	Troutdale	Multnomah	Portland Metro	Historic house	On the National Register of Historic Places; the grounds are part of the city park system; run by the Troutdale Historical Society
Harney County Historical Society Museum	Burns	Harney	Eastern	History - Local	Includes pioneer family items and furniture, Native American artifacts, weapons, clothing
Harrisburg Area Museum	Harrisburg	Linn	Willamette Valley	History - Local	Scale models of historic buildings, including Crater Lake Lodge; cameras and buttons; antique farm equipment, steam engine, tractors, engines, blacksmith shop and household items; pictures and biographies of settlers; 1867-era house and household items; Overland automobile; a chapel
Hatfield Marine Science Visitor Center	Newport	Lincoln	Coast	Natural history - Maritime	Exhibits and programs to explain the role of scientific research in marine natural history as well as the fishing industry
Heceta Head Lighthouse	Florence	Lane	Coast	Maritime	Working lighthouse open for tours
Helzer Art Gallery - Portland Community College	Hillsboro	Washington	Portland Metro	Art	website, located in Building 3 of the Rock Creek Campus
Heritage Station Museum	Pendleton	Umatilla	Eastern	History - Local	Website; also known as Umatilla County Historical Museum, located in a 1909 depot, grounds include a caboose, 1879 one-room schoolhouse, and 1879 homestead with log cabin
Heslin House	Fairview	Multnomah	Portland Metro	Historic house	Operated by the East County Historical Organization, late 19th-century house
High Desert Museum	Bend	Deschutes	Central	Multiple	Includes live animals and natural history exhibits, pioneer life and seasonal living history 1880 ranch, early 1860s town, Native American exhibits, antique vehicles, trails
Historic Barlow House	Barlow	Clackamas	Portland Metro	Historic house	Open by appointment
Historic Deepwood Estate	Salem	Marion	Willamette Valley	Historic house	1894 Queen Anne style Victorian Home on about 4 acres (16,000 m^{2}) of manicured gardens and nature trails
Hood River County History Museum	Hood River	Hood River	The Gorge	History - Local	County history
Hoover-Minthorn House Museum	Newberg	Yamhill	Willamette Valley	Historic house	Late 19th-century period home, home of President Herbert Hoover from 1885 to 1889
Hutson Museum	Parkdale	Hood River	The Gorge	Natural history / History - Local	Also known as the "Jesse and Winifred Hutson Museum"; rocks, minerals and Native American artifacts, memorabilia, dolls and items related to local history; in a building constructed to match the neighboring Ries-Thompson House; part of a 2-acre (8,100 m^{2}) complex designated a National Historic Site; U.S. Forest Service amphitheater on the site offers lectures and demonstrations.
I. O. N. Heritage Museum	Jordan Valley	Malheur	Eastern	History - Local	History of an area encompassing parts of Idaho, Oregon and Nevada (the "I.O.N." in the title)
Independence Heritage Museum	Independence	Polk	Willamette Valley	History - Local	Website
International Museum of Carousel Art	Hood River	Hood River	Mt. Hood/ The Gorge	Commodity - Carousel	The museum calls its holdings "world's largest and most comprehensive collection of antique carousel art"; as of May 2008, temporarily closed as museum relocates
Interactive Museum of Gaming and Puzzlery	King City	Washington	Portland Metro Area	Toy	website, dedicated to board games, puzzles, video games, construction toys
Jesse H. Settlemier House	Woodburn	Marion	Willamette Valley	Historic house	14-room, Queen Anne style home built in 1892 by Jesse Settlemier, founder of Woodburn
John Day Fossil Beds National Monument	Dayville	Grant	Eastern	Natural history	Includes the Thomas Condon Paleontology Center with fossil exhibits, and the Cant Ranch Museum with exhibits about the cultural heritage of the area
John Tigard House	Tigard	Washington	Portland Metro	Historic house	1880 Victorian style farm home; on the National Register of Historic Places; run by the Tigard Historical Association
Jordan Schnitzer Museum of Art	Eugene	Lane	Willamette Valley	Art	Part of the University of Oregon, American and regional art, Korean, Chinese, Japanese and European art, including Russian icons
Kam Wah Chung & Co. Museum	John Day	Grant	Eastern	Ethnic - Chinese	Perfectly preserved Chinese apothecary and residence highlighting Chinese culture and heritage in Oregon.
Kathrin Cawein Gallery of Art	Forest Grove	Washington	Portland Metro	Art - Contemporary	Art gallery of Pacific University named in honor of the artist, Kathrin Cawein
Kerbyville Museum	Kerby	Josephine	Southern	History - Local	Displays on local history including mining, logging and pioneer history, and Native Americans; Naucke House on the National Register of Historic Places
Kid Time!	Medford	Jackson	Southern	Children's	
Klamath County Museum	Klamath Falls	Klamath	Southern	History - Local / Natural history	Website; History and natural history; in a 1935 building, formerly a National Guard armory; run by Klamath County Museums organization
Lake Creek Historical Society	Lake Creek	Jackson	Southern	History - Local	
Lake County Museum	Lakeview	Lake	Southern	History - Local	
Lane County History Museum	Eugene	Lane	Willamette Valley	History - Local	Website; Oregon Trail exhibit, historic vehicles, period rooms, children's exhibits, early crafts, photographs; run by the Lane County Historical Society; includes Lane County Clerk's Building, a National Historic Register site that is the oldest building in the county (built 1853)
Latimer Quilt and Textile Center	Tillamook	Tillamook	Coast	Art - Quilts	Website; exhibits on antique and contemporary quilts
Linn County Historical Museum	Brownsville	Linn	Willamette Valley	History - Local	Website, located in Brownsville's original railroad depot with railroad displays; lives, work, and cultures of Native People, Oregon Trail immigrants, pioneer settlers, and early families and communities; also known as the Brownsville Historic Pioneer Museum
Little Log Church Museum	Yachats	Lincoln	Coast	Multiple	Local historical artifacts, seashell collection, and works of local artists and authors
Manuel Museum	Hot Lake	Union	Eastern	Multiple	Located in the Hot Lake Hotel, features Native American artifacts, military memorabilia, pioneer items
Marshfield Sun Printing Museum	Coos Bay	Coos	Coast	Media - Newspaper	The weekly Marshfield Sun (1891–1944) newspaper office and job printing shop displaying printing presses, newspaper and photo-related exhibits of Marshfield (now Coos Bay)
Maude Kerns Art Center	Eugene	Lane	Willamette Valley	Art	Community visual arts center
Milwaukie Museum	Milwaukie	Clackamas	Portland Metro	Historic house	1865 farmhouse; collection includes 1872 Portland Street Railway Co. horse-drawn streetcar
Molalla Museum Complex	Molalla	Clackamas	Portland Metro	Multiple	website - includes the historic Dibble House, Vonder Ahe House, Ivor Davies Hall and a farm & logging machinery shed; emphasis on Native Americans, early pioneers, agriculture, timber industry, commerce, schools, genealogy, Wilhoit Mineral Springs, and the Molalla Buckeroo Rodeo
Monteith House	Albany	Linn	Willamette Valley	Historic house	1849 restored Pioneer Era home; listed on the National Register of Historic Places
Morrow County Agriculture Museum	Heppner	Morrow	Eastern	Agriculture	Area farming, ranching, forestry
Morrow County Museum	Heppner	Morrow	Eastern	History - Local	Includes pioneer, homestead, agricultural and rural history artifacts
Mount Angel Abbey Museum	Mount Angel	Marion	Willamette Valley	Multiple	Includes natural history dioramas, religious artifacts and Civil War memorabilia
Moyer House	Brownsville	Linn	Willamette Valley	Historic house	Late 19th-century Italian-style mansion with period Victorian furnishings
Mt. Hood Cultural Center & Museum	Government Camp	Clackamas	Mt. Hood/ The Gorge	History - Local	Website; History of Mt. Hood area, encompassing Clackamas, Hood River, Multnomah and Wasco counties, also art and natural history
Museum At Warm Springs	Warm Springs	Jefferson	Central	Ethnic - Native American	History and culture of the Confederated Tribes of Warm Springs
Museum of the Oregon Territory	Oregon City	Clackamas	Portland Metro	History	Website, Oregon culture, early photography, Industry, Oregon City & Willamette Falls, operated by the Clackamas County Historical Society
National Historic Oregon Trail Interpretive Center	Baker City	Baker	Eastern	History	History, natural history and cultural history of the settlement of the Oregon Trail
Newell House Museum	St. Paul	Marion	Willamette Valley	Historic house	Reconstructed home of the first Speaker of the Oregon House of Representatives; living history activities, archives, and artifacts from the French Prairie region of the northern Willamette Valley; also known as "Robert Newell House"
Newport Visual Arts Center	Newport	Lincoln	Coast	Art	Public art exhibition space, art education programs, maintained by the Oregon Coast Council for the Arts
Next Level Pinball Museum	Hillsboro	Washington	Portland Metro	Gaming	Pinball machines and arcade games
North Lincoln County Historical Museum	Lincoln City	Lincoln	Coast	History - Local	Website; north Lincoln County history, including Native Americans and pioneers
Oakland Museum	Oakland	Douglas	Southern	History - Local	Includes historic furniture, a bank exhibit, post office, general store, clothing, toys, photographs, tools and local history
Oakridge Museum	Oakridge	Lane	Willamette Valley	History - Local	Farming, logging, railroading, U.S. Forest Service, schools and families; a caboose, trucks Historical artifacts of the upper Willamette River region
Old Aurora Colony	Aurora	Marion	Willamette Valley	Open-air	Website; complex includes a museum of local history and a mid-19th-century ox barn, cabin, house, summer kitchen and tie shed, operated by the Aurora Colony Historical Society
Old St. Peter's Landmark	The Dalles	Wasco	Mt. Hood/ The Gorge	Historic building - Church	Former Roman Catholic 1898 Gothic Revival church with Italian Carrara marble altars; Povey Brothers stained glass windows; six-foot rooster weather vane on a 176-foot (54 m) spire
Oregon Air and Space Museum	Eugene	Lane	Willamette Valley	Aerospace	Aircraft, artifacts, displays and exhibits on the history of aviation and space exploration; collection includes rare World War II American Eagle aviator uniform and pilot's personal effects
Oregon Coast Historical Railway	Coos Bay	Coos	Coast	Railroad	website, heritage railway and museum
Oregon Electric Railway Museum	Brooks	Marion	Willamette Valley	Railroad	Electric trolleys, on the grounds of Antique Powerland
Oregon Film Museum	Astoria	Clatsop	Coast	Film	History and information on the 300+ movies that have been filmed in Oregon
Oregon Fire Service Museum	Brooks	Marion	Willamette Valley	Firefighting	Historical fire records, apparatus, equipment and memorabilia
Oregon Military Museum	Clackamas	Clackamas	Portland Metro	Military	The state's official military history repository; has military arms and ordnance, restored military vehicles and aircraft, uniforms and insignia, and military equipment, historic structures, and a library and archives
Oregon Paleo Lands Institute Center	Fossil	Wheeler	Eastern	Natural history	website, area geology, fossils, natural history
Oregon State Capitol	Salem	Marion	Willamette Valley	History	Tours of the building, exhibits of art, minerals
Oregon State Hospital Museum of Mental Health	Salem	Marion	Willamette Valley	Medical	History of the hospital and past practices in treatments
Oregon Trail Agricultural Museum	Nyssa	Malheur	Eastern	Agriculture	Collection includes early farm and ranch equipment; restored sheep wagons, historical photographs of Nyssa, Adrian and the surrounding area, Oregon Trail history
Original Wasco County Courthouse	The Dalles	Wasco	Mt. Hood/ The Gorge	History	1859 courthouse with sheriff's office and three jail cells
Oswego Heritage Center	Lake Oswego	Clackamas	Portland Metro	History - Local	website
Pacific Maritime and Heritage Center	Newport	Lincoln	Coast	Maritime	website, operated by the Lincoln County Historical Society, maritime exhibits, local history and art
Pacific Northwest Truck Museum	Brooks	Marion	Willamette Valley	Transportation	Located on the grounds of Antique Powerland, vintage trucks, vans, semi-trailers and tractors
Pacific University Museum	Forest Grove	Washington	Portland Metro	History - Local	Part of Pacific University, open by appointment only; the history of the university; in Old College Hall, the oldest (1850) building at Pacific University; on the National Register of Historic Places
Patrick Hughes House	Sixes	Curry	Coast	Historic house	Built in 1898 by P.J. Lindberg; part of the "Historic Patrick Hughes Ranch"; listed on the National Register of Historic Places; run by Cape Blanco Heritage Society
Pendleton Air Museum	Pendleton	Umatilla	Eastern	History - Local, Military	https://Pendletonairmuseum.org Non-profit Blue Star museum featuring military and aviation history museum with strong ties to WWII Doolittle Raiders, Triple Nickel & Army Air Corp Base Pendleton Field.
Pendleton Round-Up and Happy Canyon Hall of Fame	Pendleton	Umatilla	Eastern	Hall of fame - Rodeo	Cowboy and cowgirl memorabilia, Native American regalia, championship saddles, historical photographs and documents
Petersen Rock Garden & Museum	Redmond	Deschutes	Central		Miniature buildings, lagoons, bridges, gardens, churches, castles made of rock. Being substantially deteriorated, it is one of ten entries on the Historic Preservation League of Oregon's Most Endangered Places in Oregon 2011 list.
Philip Foster Farm	Eagle Creek	Clackamas	Portland Metro	Farm	Farm of Philip Foster, includes original 19th-century houses and barn, covered wagons, replica blacksmith shop and store, and heritage gardens
Phoenix Historical Museum	Phoenix	Jackson	Southern	History - Local	Operated by the Phoenix Historical Society
Pioneer Mothers Memorial Cabin Museum	St. Paul	Marion	Willamette Valley	Historic house	Log cabin with pioneer artifacts, in Champoeg State Heritage Area
Pioneer-Indian Museum	Canyonville	Douglas	Southern	History - Local	Operated by the South Umpqua Historical Society, pioneer and Native American artifacts
Pitney House Museum	Junction City	Lane	Willamette Valley	Historic house	Run by the Junction City Historical Society, 1870s period home with Danish settler artifacts, also adjacent jail
Polk County Museum	Rickreall	Polk	Willamette Valley	History - Local	Website; Includes exhibits on agriculture, logging, and the Kalapuya tribe that occupied Polk County
Port Orford Lifeboat Station Museum	Port Orford	Curry	Coast	Maritime	Displays about the lifeboat station, in a 1934 building closed in 1970; hiking trails; listed on the National Register of Historic Places
Prewitt-Allen Archaeological Museum	Salem	Marion	Willamette Valley	Archaeology	Part of Corban University, archaeological artifacts from the Middle East and Greece
Rail Depot Museum	Troutdale	Multnomah	Portland Metro	Railroad	In 1894, Coxey's Army, a band of unemployed men, went into the railyard and hijacked a train; the present building was built in 1907, the year the previous one burnt down; a Union Pacific caboose is in the parking lot; in Depot Park; run by the Troutdale Historical Society
Railroad Park	Medford	Jackson	Southern	Railroad	website, 49-acre city park with full size railroad cars, a caboose, a hopper car, a locomotive, HO Scale model trains, working telegraph system, museum operated by the Southern Oregon Railway Historical Society
Real Life Exhibit	Tigard	Washington	Portland Metro	Humanitarian Aid	Website; step into the lives and homes of people affected by crisis around the world. Part of Medical Teams International.
Rice Northwest Museum of Rocks and Minerals	Hillsboro	Washington	Portland Metro	Geology	Claims to have the "largest opal-filled thunderegg in the world", large pieces of crystallized gold, meteorites, dinosaur eggs and fossils
Ripley's Believe It or Not!	Newport	Lincoln	Coast	Amusement	
Rinehart Stone House Museum	Vale	Malheur	Eastern	Oregon Trail / House museum /	Local history items and photographs, exhibits on the Oregon Trail in an 1872 sandstone building that was a wayside stop for travelers until the early 20th century, a shelter for settlers during the Northern Paiute uprising of 1878, also field headquarters for General O. O. Howard, on the National Register of Historic Places
Rogue River Museum	Gold Beach	Curry	Coast	Multiple	Natural history and history of the Rogue River; run by a for-profit boat excursion company; free admission
Rogue River Ranch		Curry	Coast	Historic house	Pioneer ranch house complex
Rorick House Museum	The Dalles	Wasco	Mt. Hood/ The Gorge	Historic house	1850 period house operated by the Wasco County Historical Society
Santiam Historical Society Museum	Stayton	Marion	Willamette Valley	History - Local	
Sandy Historical Museum	Sandy	Clackamas	Portland Metro	History - Local	Website; run by the Sandy Historical Society
Schmidt House Museum	Grants Pass	Josephine	Southern	Historic house	Run by the Josephine County Historical Society, early 20th-century period house, includes antique toy collection
Schminck Memorial Museum	Lakeview	Lake	Southern	History - Local	Includes Native American and pioneer artifacts, antique household items and furnishings, operated by the Oregon State Daughters of the American Revolution
Schneider Museum of Art	Ashland	Jackson	Southern	Art	Website; part of Southern Oregon University
Science Factory Children's Museum & Planetarium	Eugene	Lane	Willamette Valley	Children's / Science - Science center	Hands-on science museum for children
ScienceWorks Hands-on Museum	Ashland	Jackson	Southern	Science	Hands-on science museum for all ages. Includes rotating exhibits, DaVinci's Garage (a maker/tinkering space), an under-5 play area and permanent exhibits focusing on physics.
Scio Historical Depot Museum	Scio	Linn	Willamette Valley	History - Local	Memorabilia from the area, including clothing, farm implements and household goods; in the original 1890s West Scio railroad depot
Seaside Historical Society Museum	Seaside	Clatsop	Coast	History - Local	Website, local history and Native American artifacts, Butterfield Cottage depicts beach cottage and rooming house of 1912
Shelton-McMurphey-Johnson House	Eugene	Lane	Willamette Valley	Historic house	The "Castle on the Hill," built in 1888, a Queen Anne style Victorian mansion
Sherman County Historical Museum	Moro	Sherman	Eastern	History - Local	Website; includes farm machinery, tools, household items, memorabilia from Sherman County's early settlers, Native American items
Sherwood Heritage Center	Sherwood	Washington	Portland Metro	History	website; Museum and living history site in two historical buildings; train exhibit
Shedd Museum	Shedd	Linn	Willamette Valley	History - Local	Housed in the former Bank of Shedd, near home of the pioneer Shedd family; community memorabilia, including Civil War and Oregon Trail items
Silverton Country Museum	Silverton	Marion	Willamette Valley	History - Local	website; Silverton area history; operated by the Silverton County Historical Society in the 1908 Ames/Warnock House
Siuslaw Pioneer Museum	Florence	Lane	Coast	History - Local	Website, Siuslaw River and its pioneers, logging, agriculture, blacksmithing, transportation, Native American artifacts
Spray Pioneer Museum	Spray	Wheeler	Eastern	History - Local	Includes pioneer items, photographs and farm implements
Springfield Museum	Springfield	Lane	Willamette Valley	History - Local	In the 1911 Oregon Power Company transformer station, listed on the National Register of Historic Places.
Stevens-Crawford Heritage House	Oregon City	Clackamas	Portland Metro	Historic house	Website; 1908 period home with original furnishings, oddities, personal belongings, and kitchen utensils of one of the Oregon Territory's earliest families, operated by the Clackamas County Historical Society
Sumpter Museum and Public Library	Sumpter	Baker	Eastern	History - Local / Natural history	History and natural history of the Sumpter Valley
Sumpter Valley Gold Dredge	Sumpter	Baker	Eastern	Industry - Mining	Historic gold dredge, museum and park
Talent Historical Society Museum	Talent	Jackson	Southern	History - Local	
Tamastslikt Cultural Institute	Pendleton	Umatilla	Eastern	Ethnic - Native American	Tamastslikt history and culture; associated with the Wildhorse Resort & Casino
Think Link Discovery Center	La Grande	Union	Eastern	Children's	Website
Thompson's Mills State Heritage Site	Shedd	Linn	Willamette Valley	Industry/ State History	Oregon's oldest water-powered mill. Guided tours, self-guided tours, mill operates on water power and electric power. Pioneer orchards and gardens under restoration, heritage turkeys, ducks and chickens, grounds open for picnicking and fishing.
Tillamook County Pioneer Museum	Tillamook	Tillamook	Coast	History - Local	Website; North Oregon coastal history and natural history are combined in the former courthouse in downtown Tillamook. Founded in 1935.
Tillamook Air Museum	Tillamook	Tillamook	Coast	Aviation	Located in a WW II blimp hangar, includes over 30 War Birds and memorabilia
Toledo History Center	Toledo	Lincoln	Coast	History - Local	Logging, railroad, marine industry, boatbuilding and settlement history of the Toledo area
Train Mountain Railroad	Chiloquin	Klamath	Southern	Railroad	Miniature hobbyist railroad and museum with antique full size railroad rolling stock and artifacts
Traveling Children's Heritage Museum	Greenleaf	Lane	Willamette Valley	Children's / History - Local	Museum run by area teachers that can be moved from location to location in its cargo trailer; has a model covered wagon, canvas lodging tent, historical artifacts, oral histories, late-19th-century photographs
Tualatin Heritage Center	Tualatin	Clackamas	Portland Metro	History - Local	Operated by the Tualatin Historical Society
Umatilla Museum and Historical Foundation	Umatilla	Umatilla	Eastern	History - Local	Website
Umpqua Discovery Center	Reedsport	Douglas	Coast	Natural history / History - Local	Website; Nature exhibits and history exhibits about the Kuuich tribe, fur traders and European settlers of the Lower Umpqua River
Umpqua River Lighthouse and Coastal History Museum	Winchester Bay	Douglas	Coast	Maritime	History of the lighthouse, area Coast Guard history and local history; in a working lighthouse and adjacent former Coast Guard Station
Union County Museum	Union	Union	Eastern	History - Local	website, cowboys, cattle, natural and cultural history of the Grande Ronde Valle, agriculture, timber, transportation, pioneers, mining
University of Oregon Museum of Natural and Cultural History	Eugene	Lane	Willamette Valley	Natural history / History	Oregon's landscapes, climate, and ecosystems, fossils, geology, cultures and ecosystems of the Arctic, culture through archaeological sites,
Upper Rogue Historical Society Museum	Trail	Jackson	Southern	History - Local	Artifacts and pictures from the Upper Rogue; in a former tavern, formerly known as the Trail Creek Tavern Museum
Uppertown Firefighter's Museum	Astoria	Clatsop	Coast	Fire fighting	Fire-fighting equipment from 1879 to 1963; hand-pulled, horse-drawn, and motorized fire engines; fire fighting memorabilia and photos; operated by the Clatsop County Historical Society
U.S. Cavalry and American Indian Museum	Blue River	Lane	Willamette Valley	Multiple	History of the U.S. Cavalry from 1861 to 1943, Native American daily life, spirituality, matriarchal society, tools, clothing, baskets, pottery
Vernonia Pioneer Museum	Vernonia	Columbia	Portland Metro	History - Local	Artifacts of local history and Native American artifacts
Waldport Heritage Museum	Waldport	Lincoln	Coast	History - Local	website, operated by the Alsi Historical and Genealogical Society
Wallowa Band Nez Perce Trail Interpretive Center	Wallowa	Wallowa	Eastern	Ethnic - Native American	Website; Wallowa Band Nez Perce culture and history
Wallowa County Museum	Joseph	Wallowa	Eastern	History - Local	
Watts House Pioneer Museum	Scappoose	Columbia	Portland Metro	History - Local	Run by the Scappoose Historical Society, local history and period displays in a 1902 Victorian house
Western Antique Aeroplane & Automobile Museum	Hood River	Hood River	Mt. Hood/ The Gorge	Aviation / Automobile	Focus on aircraft from 1903 to 1941, also light WWII Army, Army Air Corps, and naval aircraft, antique automobiles, military vehicles, aircraft engines.Website
Willamette Heritage Center	Salem	Marion	Willamette Valley	Multiple	Former Thomas Kay woolen mill (1889–1962); Jason Lee's Methodist mission to Oregon which settled in the Willamette Valley in 1834; mission houses, Oregon Trail settler's house, historic church and the structures, equipment, and original water-powered turbine of the mill and related artifacts
Willamina Museum of Local History	Willamina	Yamhill	Willamette Valley	History - Local	
William L. Holmes House at Rose Farm	Oregon City	Clackamas	Portland Metro	Historic house	Oldest American home in Oregon City
Wiseman Gallery	Grants Pass	Josephine	Southern	Art	Operated by Rogue Community College, aesthetic, cultural, and social works
Woodburn Historical Museum	Woodburn	Marion	Willamette Valley	History - Local	
Woodville Museum	Rogue River	Jackson	Southern	History - Local	Operated by the Woodville Historical Society
Yamhill Valley Heritage Center	McMinnville	Yamhill	Willamette Valley	History - Local	Operated by the Yamhill County Historical Society, includes antique farm equipment, a sawmill, schoolhouse
Yamhill County Historical Society Museum	Lafayette	Yamhill	Willamette Valley	History - Local	Includes tools, carriages, doctor's and dentist's equipment, pioneer bedroom, early 20th-century parlor, dolls, Yamhill County memorabilia, quilts, textiles, Native American baskets and tools
Yaquina Bay Light	Newport	Lincoln	Coast	Maritime	Lighthouse and period keeper's quarters rooms
Yaquina Head Interpretive Center	Newport	Lincoln	Coast	Maritime	Lighthouse and interpretive center
Yaquina Pacific Railroad Historical Society	Toledo	Lincoln	Coast	Railroad	Website; outdoor railroad and logging "Heritage Square"; static display of 1922 Baldwin Steam engine, 1923 railway Post Office car, 1907 caboose, railroad artifacts
Yaquina River Museum of Art	Toledo	Lincoln	Coast	Art	Website; paintings by artists inspired by the land and people of the Yaquina River watershed
Zimmerman House	Gresham	Multnomah	Portland Metro	Historic house	Turn-of-the-century farmstead house with furnishings spanning over 100 years

== Museums and organizations encompassed by Antique Powerland Museums ==
Antique Powerland Museums, according to its website, "encompasses 14 additional museums and heritage organizations operating in partnership", which are not listed in the sortable table above (except as noted):

- Antique Caterpillar Machinery Museum
- Antique Implement Society
- Branch 15 - Early Days Gas Engines & Tractor Association
- Brooks Historical Society Inc.
- Northwest Blacksmith Association
- Northwest Vintage Car and Motorcycle Museum
- Oregon Electric Railway Museum (listed above)
- Oregon Fire Service Museum and Learning Center
- Oregon Tractors Pullers, Inc.
- Oregon Two Cylinder Club
- Pacific Northwest Truck Museum (listed above)
- Western Steam Fiends Association, Inc.
- Willamette Valley Model Railroad Museum
- Willow Creek Railroad

== Oregon regions ==
The region designations used in the table above follow the Oregon Museums Association regions (the state tourism authority uses slightly different regions):

- Central:
  - All of Crook, Deschutes, Jefferson counties
  - Most of Wasco County except the northern part (such as the communities along Interstate 84)
- Coast:
  - All of Clatsop, Coos, Curry, Lincoln and Tillamook counties
  - Western parts of Douglas County, including Scottsburg (on Highway 38); and western parts of Lane County including Mapleton (on Highway 126
- Eastern:
  - All of Baker, Gilliam, Grant, Harney, Malheur, Morrow, Sherman County, Umatilla, Union, Wallowa, and Wheeler counties
- Mount Hood/The Gorge:
  - All of Hood River County
  - Parts of northern Wasco County, (including communities along Interstate 84), eastern parts of Multnomah and Clackamas counties, including areas east of U.S. Route 26 and communities along Interstate 84 east of Crown Point State Park, including Multnomah Falls and Bonneville.
- Portland Metro:
  - All of Columbia and Washington counties
  - Parts of Clackamas and Multnomah counties, including Sandy and Estacada and all areas west of them
- Southern:
  - All of Jackson, Josephine, Klamath, Lake counties
  - Most of Douglas County except Scottsburg and areas west of it
- Willamette Valley:
  - All of Benton, Linn, Marion, Polk, and Yamhill counties
  - Most of Lane County, except Mapleton and areas west of it

== Alternate names and changed names ==
Museums are sometimes known by more than one name, and they sometimes change their names. Here are some known variations of the names of museums in the above list (which uses each museum's most widely known name):

- Gateway to Discovery — the name used by the North Coast Land Conservancy for the Gateway Coastal Natural History Center
- Coos County Historical Society Museum – Coos Historical and Maritime Museum (2004 name change)
- Coos-Curry Museum – later split into what now are the Coos Historical and Maritime Museum and Curry Historical Society Museum
- Deepwood Estate – see Historic Deepwood Estate
- Heritage Museum – see Clatsop County Historical Society Heritage Museum
- Historic Patrick Hughes House – see Patrick Hughes House
- Hughes Historic House – see Patrick Hughes House
- Jordan Valley Owyhee Heritage Council Museum – see I. O. N. Jordan Valley Heritage Museum
- Old College Hall
- Telephone Pioneers Museum – see Qwest Pioneer Telephone Museum
- Tillamook Naval Museum – see Tillamook Naval Air Station
- Wasco County Historical Museum – part of the Columbia Gorge Discovery Center
- Yamhill Museum — see Yamhill County Historical Society Museum

== Defunct museums ==
- Columbia County Museum, St. Helens, As of March 2007, closed due to litigation
- Horner Museum, at Gill Coliseum in Corvallis, Oregon, closed 1995
- Jacksonville Museum, closed in 2009
- Sage Museum, Shaniko
- Pacific Northwest Museum of Natural History, Ashland
- Working Wonders Children's Museum, Bend, closed in 2009
- Jensen Arctic Museum, Monmouth, closed in 2013, collection moved to the Museum of Natural and Cultural History (MNCH) at the University of Oregon in Eugene.
- Pioneer Telephone Museum, Eugene, abruptly closed in 2016 for unknown reasons

== See also ==
- List of museums in Portland, Oregon
- List of historical societies in Oregon
- Nature Centers in Oregon
- Lists of Oregon-related topics
