= Cawein =

Cawein is a surname. Notable people with the surname include:

- Kathrin Cawein (1895–1996), American printmaker and etcher
  - Kathrin Cawein Gallery of Art
- Madison Cawein (1865–1914), American poet
