= National Register of Historic Places listings in Columbia County, Oregon =

Location of Columbia County in Oregon

This list presents the full set of buildings, structures, objects, sites, or districts designated on the National Register of Historic Places in Columbia County, Oregon, United States, and offers brief descriptive information about each of them. The National Register recognizes places of national, state, or local historic significance across the United States. Out of over 90,000 National Register sites nationwide, Oregon is home to over 2,000, and 13 of those are found partially or wholly in Columbia County.

This National Park Service list is complete through NPS recent listings posted March 14, 2025.

== Current listings ==
	Name on the Register	Image	Date listed	Location	City or town	Description
1	Dr. Charles G. and Lucinda McBride Caples Farmstead	Dr. Charles G. and Lucinda McBride Caples Farmstead	September 21, 2005 (#05001060)	1925 1st Street; 45°53′25″N 122°48′29″W	Columbia City	Charles Caples (1832–1906) was the first physician in Columbia County and built this home in 1870. Lucinda McBride Caples (d. 1916) served as a midwife and had family connections to many prominent Oregonians of the period. Charles, Lucinda, and the extended Caples family made important contributions to the early development of the town, including establishment of its first school.
2	Clatskanie IOOF Hall	Clatskanie IOOF Hall	March 7, 2012 (#12000078)	75 S. Nehalem Street; 46°06′13″N 123°12′14″W	Clatskanie	
3	Cox–Williams House	Cox–Williams House	November 1, 1982 (#82001501)	280 S 1st Street; 45°51′45″N 122°47′51″W	St. Helens	
4	Thomas J. Flippin House	Thomas J. Flippin House	March 7, 1979 (#79002048)	620 Tichenor Street; 46°06′03″N 123°12′28″W	Clatskanie	
5	John and Carolena Heimuller Farmstead	John and Carolena Heimuller Farmstead	February 28, 2011 (#11000049)	32600 SW J. P. West Road; 45°45′18″N 122°53′48″W	Scappoose vicinity	
6	Longview Bridge	Longview Bridge	July 16, 1982 (#82004208)	On Washington Highway 433 spanning the Columbia River; 46°05′58″N 122°58′00″W	Rainier	
7	George F. Moeck House	George F. Moeck House	April 14, 1978 (#78002283)	713 B Street, W. 46°05′28″N 122°56′42″W	Rainier	
8	Oregon–American Lumber Company Mill Office	Oregon–American Lumber Company Mill Office	December 5, 2002 (#02001485)	511 E Bridge Street; 45°51′27″N 123°10′52″W	Vernonia	
9	Portland and Southwestern Railroad Tunnel	Portland and Southwestern Railroad Tunnel	August 17, 1981 (#81000481)	Along the Scappoose–Vernonia Highway; details of the specific location are restricted.	Scappoose vicinity	The Portland and Southwestern Railroad's 1910–1920 construction of this timber-lined tunnel across the Nehalem Divide was an unusual step for a logging railroad, which would typically rely on less permanent infrastructure. The tunnel and rail line were abandoned in 1945 as the timber industry transitioned to log transport by truck.
10	St. Helens Downtown Historic District	St. Helens Downtown Historic District	October 25, 1984 (#84000137)	Roughly Strand, 1st, 2nd, 3rd, Cowlitz, and St. Helens Streets, and Columbia Boulevard; 45°51′50″N 122°47′56″W	St. Helens	
11	United States Post Office (Scappoose)	United States Post Office (Scappoose)	January 31, 2017 (#100000618)	52643 Columbia River Highway; 45°45′34″N 122°52′43″W	Scappoose	This 1966 post office is an intact example of the facilities built by the Post Office Department in the late 1950s and the 1960s. These buildings, mostly of a modest, Modern style, mark a period in post office design between the PWA-led monumental buildings of the Great Depression and the 1971 postal reorganization.
12	James Grant Watts House	James Grant Watts House	November 28, 1980 (#80003308)	206 SE 1st Street; 45°45′22″N 122°52′36″W	Scappoose	
13	Woodbine Cemetery – Green Mountain Cemetery	Woodbine Cemetery – Green Mountain Cemetery	August 9, 2001 (#01000829)	75900 Larson Road; 46°05′56″N 122°59′52″W	Rainier vicinity	

== See also ==
- National Register of Historic Places listings in Oregon
- Listings in neighboring counties: Clark, Clatsop, Cowlitz, Multnomah, Tillamook, Wahkiakum, Washington
- Historic preservation
- History of Oregon
- Lists of Oregon-related topics
