= Seabury C. Mastick =

American politician (1871–1969)

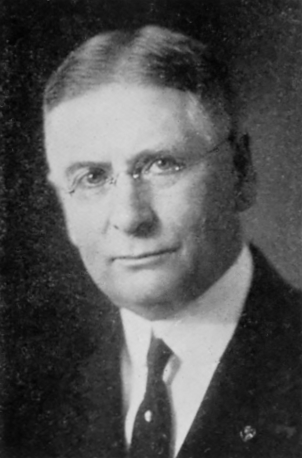

Member of the New York State Senate
- In office 1923–1934
- Constituency: 26th District

Member of the New York State Assembly
- In office 1921–1922
- Constituency: 3rd District

Personal details
- Born: Seabury Cone; July 19, 1871 San Francisco, California, US
- Died: August 21, 1969 (aged 98) Manchester, England
- Party: Republican
- Spouses: Agnes Eliza Warner (m. 1896; died 1963) Kathrin Cawein (m. 1964)
- Education: Oberlin College; University of California Hastings School of Law; Columbia University
- Occupation: Lawyer, politician, military officer
- Awards: Conspicuous Service Cross (1923)

Seabury Cone Mastick (July 19, 1871 – August 21, 1969) was an American lawyer and politician from New York.

== Life ==
Seabury Cone was born in San Francisco on July 19, 1871, the son of William Henry Cone and Laura Jeanette (Mastick) Cone. After the death of his parents, he was adopted by his uncle Seabury L. Mastick and his wife Mary Wood Mastick. He attended Hopkins Academy in Oakland, California, and graduated A.B. from Oberlin College in 1891. He graduated LL.B. from University of California Hastings School of Law in 1894, and A.M. from Oberlin College the same year. He was admitted to the bar, and practiced law in San Francisco until 1896.

On October 1, 1896, he married Agnes Eliza Warner (1872–1963), a fellow student at Oberlin from Arlington, New York. The couple settled in Pleasantville, and Mastick practiced law in New York City, specialising in patent law. From 1912 to 1917, he studied chemistry at Columbia University, and in 1916 published Chemical Patents.

From 1917 to 1920, he served in the United States Navy, eventually becoming a lieutenant commander. In the Navy, he developed high velocity star shell artillery ammunition used for illuminating purposes, for which he was awarded the Citation Star. In 1923, he was awarded also the Conspicuous Service Cross. Afterwards he engaged in the manufacture of chemicals, and was President of Westvaco Chlorine Products from 1922 to 1927.

Mastick was a member of the New York State Assembly (Westchester Co., 3rd D.) in 1921 and 1922.

He was a member of the New York State Senate (26th D.) from 1923 to 1934, sitting in the 146th, 147th, 148th, 149th, 150th, 151st, 152nd, 153rd, 154th, 155th, 156th and 157th New York State Legislature. He was Chairman of the New York State Commission for the Revision of the Tax Laws from 1930 to 1938.

On August 21, 1940, he was appointed as Supervisor of the Town of Mount Pleasant.

Pacific University conferred the honorary degree of D.Sc. on him in 1952; and Wagner College the honorary degree of LL.D. in 1953.

His wife Agnes died on November 8, 1963, and he remarried to Kathrin Cawein (1895–1996) on April 3, 1964.

He died on August 21, 1969, in Manchester, while on vacation in England.

New York State Assembly
| Preceded by Edward J. Wilson | New York State Assembly; Westchester County, 3rd District; 1921–1922 | Succeeded by Milan E. Goodrich |
New York State Senate
| Preceded by Holland S. Duell | New York State Senate; 26th District; 1923–1934 | Succeeded by James A. Garrity |
