= Roberta Conner =

Tribal historian, activist, and indigenous leader

- Sísaawipam
- Born: Roberta Leigh Conner; May 31, 1955 (age 71); Pendleton, Oregon, US
- Education: Bachelor of Science Degree, University of Oregon, 1977. Master of Management, Atkinson Graduate School at Willamette University, 1984
- Occupations: Tribal Historian, Director of the Tamástslikt Cultural Institute, Writer, Activist
- Employer(s): United Indians of All Tribes Foundation, U.S. Small Business Administration, Tamástslikt Cultural Institute
- Awards: Ecotrust Indigenous Leadership Award, 2007 Buffet Award for Leadership in Conservation, 2007

Roberta "Bobbie" Conner, also known as Sísaawipam, is a tribal historian, activist, and indigenous leader who traces her ancestry to the Umatilla, Cayuse, and Nez Perce tribes. Conner is known for her work as the Director of the Tamástslikt Cultural Institute in Pendleton, Oregon, which seeks to protect, preserve, and promote the culture of the Umatilla, Cayuse, and Walla Walla peoples. In her role at the Tamástslikt Cultural Institute Conner has worked to educate the public on and preserve Indigenous culture through the "We Are," "We Were," and "We Will Be" series of exhibits, and has mentored young scholars interested in tribal cultural preservation. Conner has also sought to educate the public and fight for Native American rights in her personal life as an activist, with a special emphasis on the impact of the division into Tribal Nations and segregation into boarding schools on indigenous cultures, tribal land rights, sustainability, and the repatriation of human remains and funerary objects to Native American lands.

== Early life and education ==
Born on May 31, 1955, in Pendleton Oregon, Conner spent her early life living on the Umatilla Indian Reservation in Eastern Oregon. When Conner was thirteen she was given her Indian name "Sísaawipam" by her grandmother. Conner was also influenced by her grandfather, who grew up fishing in the Wallowas and worked to gather his familial and tribal histories. After completing High School Conner attended the University of Oregon's School of Journalism, where she earned a Bachelor of Science Degree in 1977. She later went on to attend the Atkinson Graduate School at Willamette University, where she received a Master of Management in 1984.

== Career ==
From 1977 until 1982 Conner worked for the United Indians of All Tribes Foundation in Seattle, where she provided assistance to Indian education grantees in the Pacific Northwest. After graduating from Willamette University, Conner took on a position at the U.S. Small Business Administration in Denver, Washington D.C., and Sacramento, where she worked until 1997 as a Presidential Management Intern, Branch Manager, and eventually as a district director. In 1997 Conner moved back to Oregon and joined the Tamástslikt Cultural Institute, first as the Chief Financial Officer then being promoted to Director only four months before its opening. Conner has served as the Director of the institute since, where she has worked to promote and protect the cultures of the Umatilla, Cayuse, and Walla Walla peoples. In addition to her official post at the institute Conner has also served on a number of boards and committees, such as the Oregon Parks and Recreation Commission, the Oregon Council for the Humanities Board, the Governors Task Force for Cultural Development, the Wallowa Homeland Project, the Oregon Cultural Trust, the Smithsonian's National Museum of the American Indian, the Wallowa-based Tamkaliks Celebration Committee, and the board of the American Alliance of Museums. Conner also served as the vice chair of the National Council of the Lewis and Clark Bicentennial Board of Directors, the co-chair of the Circle of Tribal Advisors, and the Vice Chair of Eastern Oregon University's inaugural Board of Trustees. Conner is also enrolled at the Confederated Tribes of Umatilla. For her achievements in her field Conner received the Ecotrust Indigenous Leadership Award in 2007. Conner was also recognized for her work as a recipient of the 2007 Buffet Award for Leadership in Conservation.

== Works ==
In addition to her professional career and her activism, Roberta Conner has also published several works on Native American history. Conner contributed an essay called "Our People Have Always Been Here" to the book Lewis and Clark Through Indian Eyes, a collection of reflections on the Lewis and Clark Expedition by Native American writers published in 2008, in which she discusses the effects of the expedition on the tribes of the Columbia Plateau. Conner also contributed the introduction to the book The Cayuse Indians: Imperial Tribesmen of Old Oregon, written by Robert H. Ruby and John Arthur Brown, which tells the history of the Cayuse people.
