= Cox–Williams House =

Historic house in Oregon, United States

- U.S. National Register of Historic Places
- U.S. Historic district – Contributing property
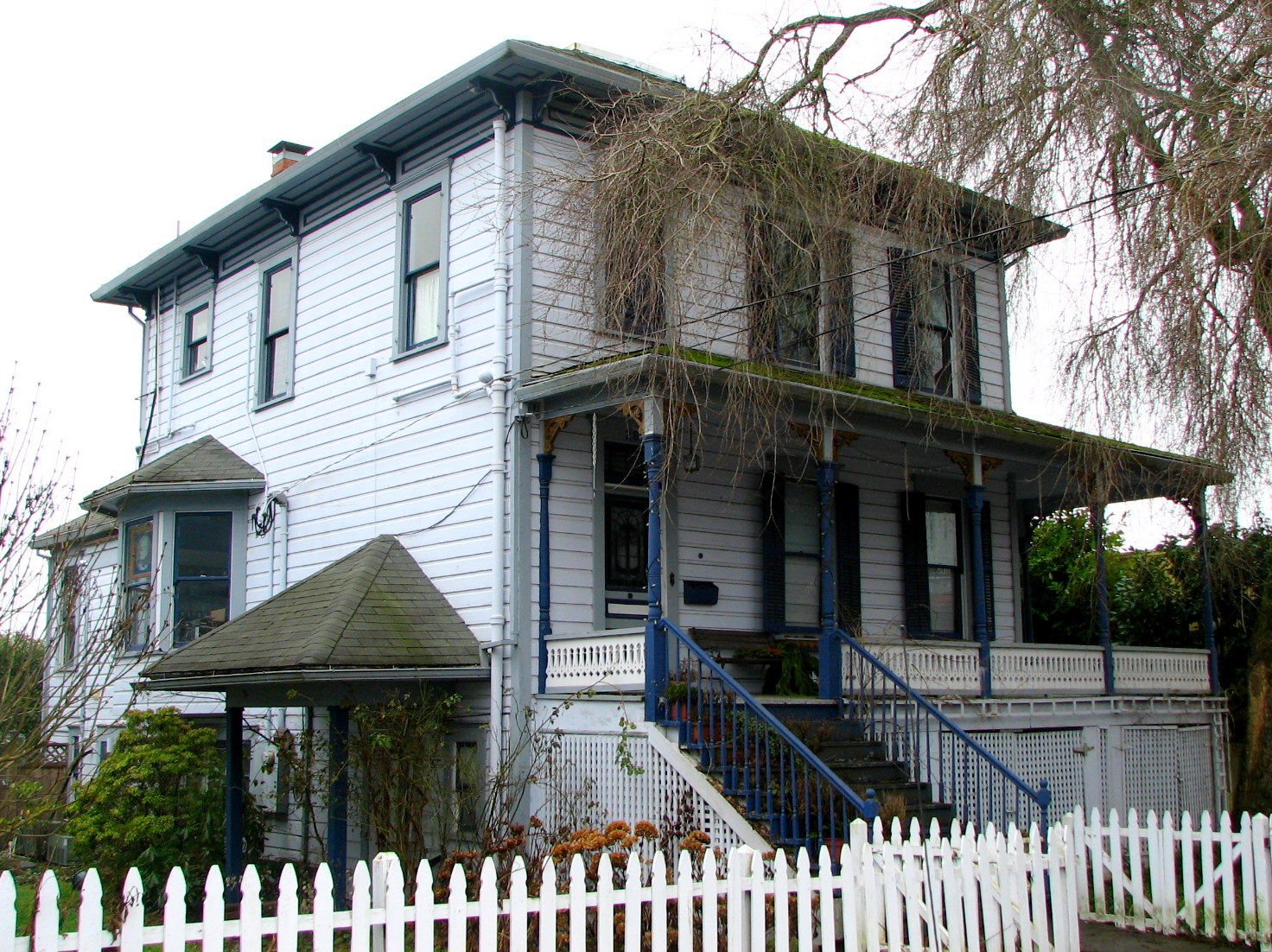
- The Cox–Williams House in 2009

- Location within Oregon Location within the United States
- Location: 208 S. 1st Street; St. Helens, Oregon
- Coordinates: 45.862593°N 122.797522°W
- Built: 1890
- Architectural style: Italianate
- Part of: St. Helens Downtown Historic District (ID84000137)
- NRHP reference No.: 82001501
- Added to NRHP: November 1, 1982

The Cox–Williams House is a historic house, located in St. Helens, Oregon, United States. It was listed on the National Register of Historic Places on November 1, 1982. It is also listed as a contributing resource in the National Register-listed St. Helens Downtown Historic District.

== See also ==
- National Register of Historic Places listings in Columbia County, Oregon
