= First Bank of Joseph =

- U.S. National Register of Historic Places
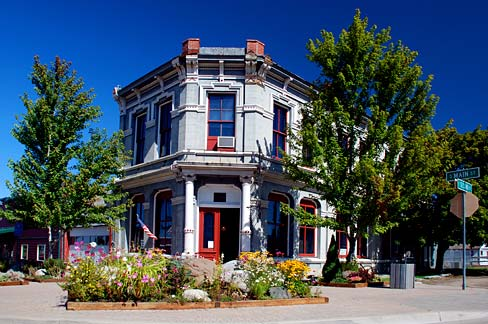

- Location within Oregon Location within the United States
- Location: 2nd and Main Sts., Joseph, Oregon
- Coordinates: 45°21′3″N 117°13′43″W
- Area: 0.1 acres (0.040 ha)
- Built: 1887
- Architectural style: Italianate, High Victorian Italianate
- NRHP reference No.: 78002324
- Added to NRHP: February 23, 1978

The First Bank of Joseph, at 2nd and Main Sts. in Joseph, Oregon, is a 25-by-91-foot (7.6 m × 27.7 m) historic building that was built in 1887. It was listed on the National Register of Historic Places in 1978.

According to its NRHP nomination, it is "a fine example of High Victorian Italianate Commercial architecture. Although the style was common in Portland and the Willamette Valley, in the isolated town of Joseph in the northeast corner of the state, such a fine example of the style is quite unusual."

It was converted to a physician's office and surgery in 1917; in 1927 the city took it over and used it as a community center with an upstairs performing arts theater. The building served as the city hall and library before 1973. After being vacant for several years, the building was renovated and, at the time of NRHP nomination, served as the Wallowa County Museum.
