= Jensen Arctic Museum =

Museum at Western Oregon University

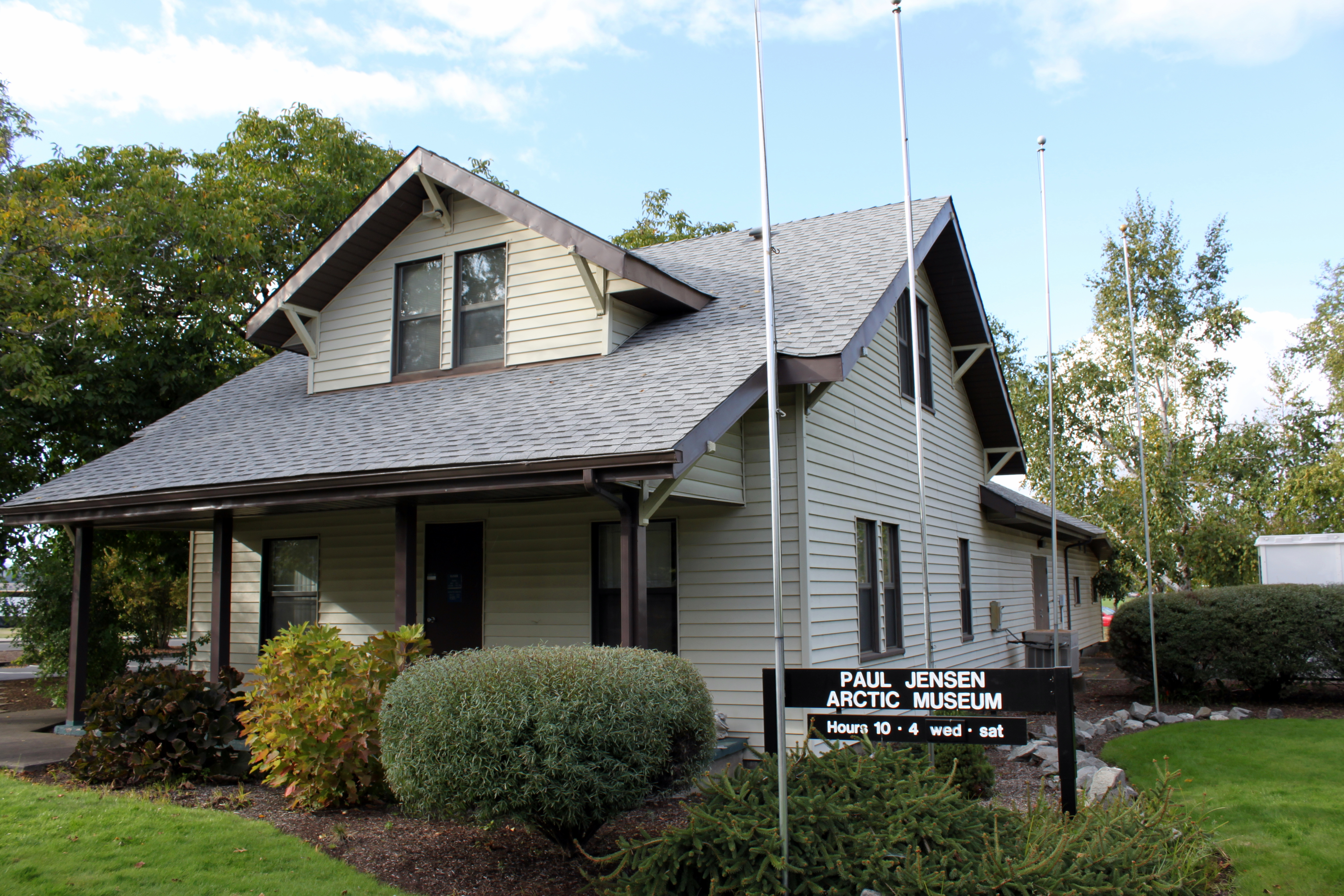
- Established: 1985
- Location: Monmouth, Oregon, United States
- Coordinates: 44.85215°N 123.24245°W
- Type: Arctic
- Visitors: 4,000 (2006–07)
- Curator: Roben Jack
- Website: website

The Paul H. Jensen Arctic Museum was a museum focused on the culture and environment of the Arctic in Monmouth in the U.S. state of Oregon. Located on the campus of Western Oregon University (WOU), the museum opened in 1985 with 3,000 artifacts collected by its late founder and namesake. The museum housed 5,000 artifacts and had exhibits on the wildlife of the Arctic along with displays that demonstrate the culture of the Inuit and Eskimo peoples of Alaska. The museum was one of only two museums focused on life in the Arctic located in the lower 48 states, and the only one on the West Coast. In 2013, WOU announced that the Jensen Museum would close its doors and the collections would move to the University of Oregon Museum of Natural and Cultural History (MNCH) at the University of Oregon in Eugene, which also has substantial Arctic collections.

== History ==
Jensen Arctic Museum was founded in June 1985 by Paul Jensen with artifacts he collected from Alaska. The artifacts were collected over 25 years while he was a researcher and teacher, with most items in the collection coming from gifts from native Alaskans. Jensen, a then retired professor at Western Oregon, served as the curator and director of the museum until his death in 1994. By 1993 the collection had grown to 3,000 artifacts and the museum had 7,000 visitors annually.

To celebrate the ten-year anniversary in 1995, the museum held a party featuring traditional Eskimo dancers. The museum received $5,000 in a federal grant in 1997 to allow it to improve its preservation of artifacts.

In January 2005, the museum sponsored the Whale in Science and Culture Symposium which featured speakers from the Oregon Coast Aquarium and Oregon State University's former president John V. Byrne among others. Each year the museum hosted a traditional salmon bake as a fundraiser, with 300 pounds of salmon cooked each year. The 28th annual salmon bake was held in 2013, when it was announced that the museum collection would move to the MNCH at the University of Oregon, the official repository for anthropological collections owned by the state of Oregon. Jon Erlandson, director of the MNCH, said that Arctic cultures and environments are rapidly changing and that the Jensen Arctic Collection holds priceless records of those changes that will be used for a variety of research and public education purposes.

== Collections ==
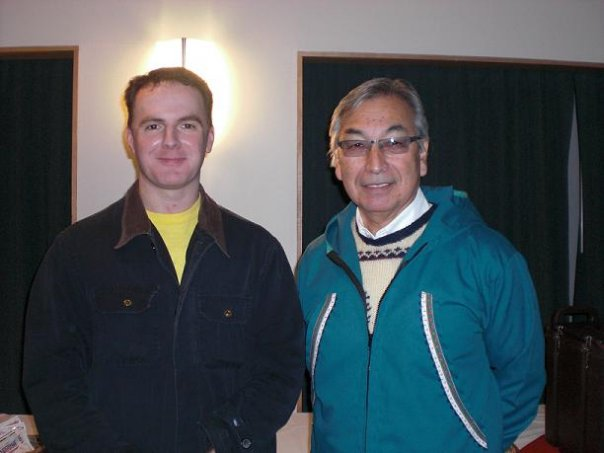
William L. Iggiagruk Hensley visits the Jensen Arctic Museum and poses with an employee.

Focused on the culture of the Inuit and Eskimos of Alaska, the museum housed over 5,000 artifacts in a former home on the campus of Western Oregon University in Monmouth. Included among the artifacts are items that demonstrate the natural environment of these native Alaskans. To showcase the environment, the museum had a room dedicated to Arctic wildlife. This life-sized diorama is called the Circumpolar Room and had an automated system that provides a narrative on the animals of the Arctic while lights illuminate busts of these animals. Animals on display included musk ox, wolves, Arctic fox, a polar bear, brown bears, a snowy owl, and caribou.

An extraordinary feature of the Jensen collection is a 27-foot-long (8.2 m) umiak, an Inuit boat with a frame constructed of driftwood and covered with walrus skins. This boat was given to Jensen by those inhabiting St. Lawrence Island in the Bering Sea, and he used the boat to circle the island during a native hunt. Other large items include a traditional Inuit home constructed of stones, hides, whalebone, and driftwood as well as an 11-foot (3.4 m) long sled and a sod house.

The museum included displays that demonstrate the daily lives of the Inuit and Eskimos, primarily the Inupiaq and Yupik Eskimos. These included exhibits on the clothing and artwork. Artifacts include ivory carvings, parkas, jackets made of seal, wolf, and bear skins, a yo-yo-type children's toy, and an anchor made from a whalebone. Other items in the collection include ropes, ivory from mammoth and mastodon tusks, animal bones, ceremonial masks carved from wood or bone, wooden dolls, mukluks, combs carved from ivory, knives, and harpoon heads among others. There is also a dog sled, kayak, snowshoes, baskets, and toys along with artwork. Artwork consists of drawings on sealskins using ink, with some pieces dating to the 1930s.

== Namesake ==
The museum was named after the founder, Paul Henry Jensen, an immigrant from Denmark, who as a child in Denmark had several classmates who were Inuit. Jensen was born on August 17, 1907, in Teestrup, Denmark, and immigrated to Canada in 1925, only to return in 1927. He served seven months in the army as required by law before immigrating to the United States in 1928. Jensen landed at Ellis Island in 1928 and then moved to Montana before starting college first at Spokane College in Washington State. In 1935, he graduated from Midland College in Nebraska with a bachelor's degree, followed by a doctorate in 1938 from the University of North Dakota. He married Arlene Munkres and they had two sons and three daughters.

After some graduate work at the University of Washington and Oregon State University, Jensen began field work in the Arctic. Beginning in 1962, he worked to improve the cultural resources of the Eskimo, bringing over 3,000 people to Oregon as well establishing seven libraries in Alaskan villages. In all he spent over 30 years teaching Eskimo children in Alaska. In 1966, he was hired at Western Oregon State College (now Western Oregon University) as a researcher, and in 1968 became a professor at the school. Jensen retired from teaching in 1979. For his work with native Alaskans, he was named as an honorary member of the Alaska Council of Elders in 1984. To the Eskimos he was known as Angyalik, which translates as captain of the ship. The next year he founded the museum with his artifacts and served as curator and director until he died on September 26, 1994.
