= Dorris Ranch Living History Farm =

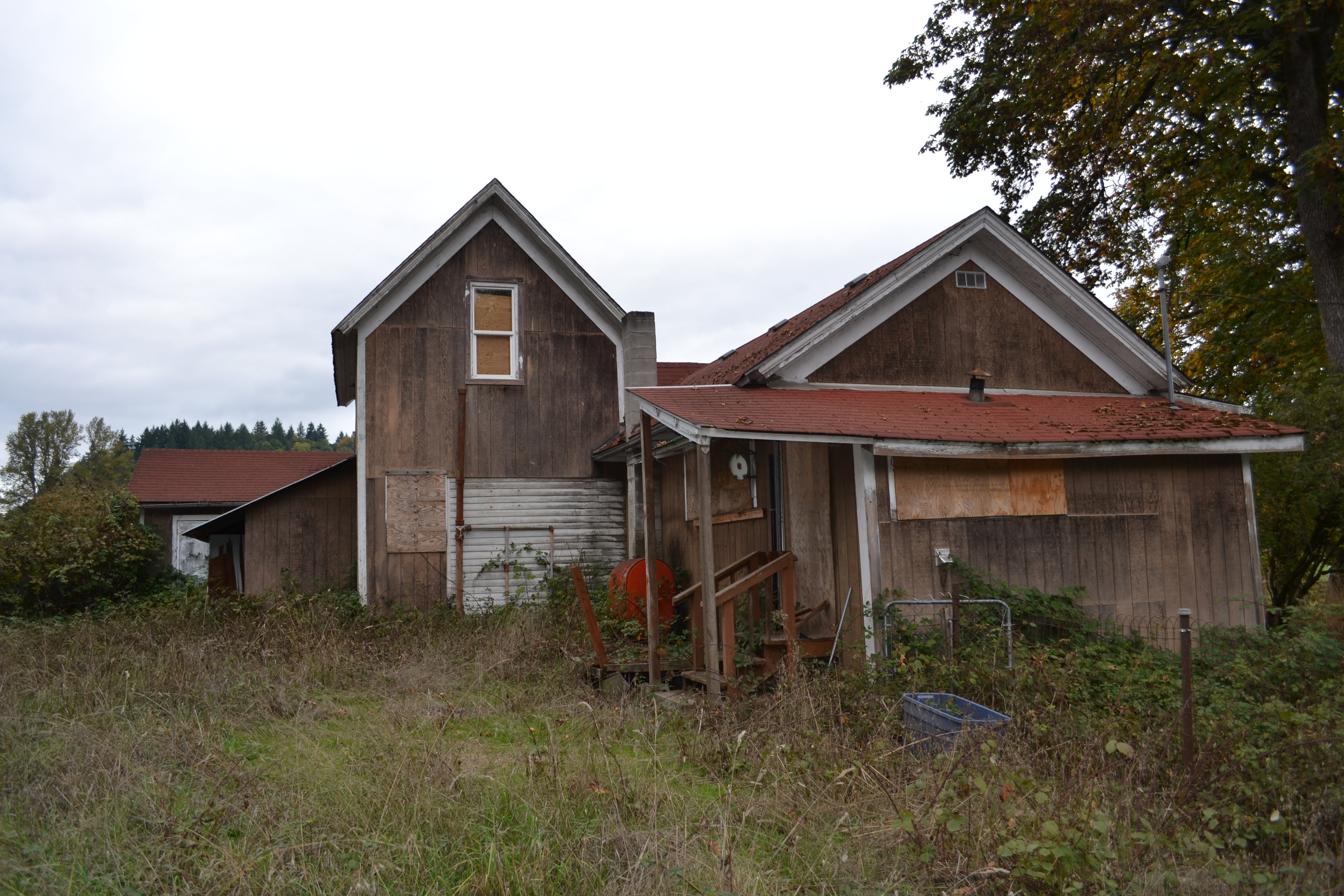
- Homestead House

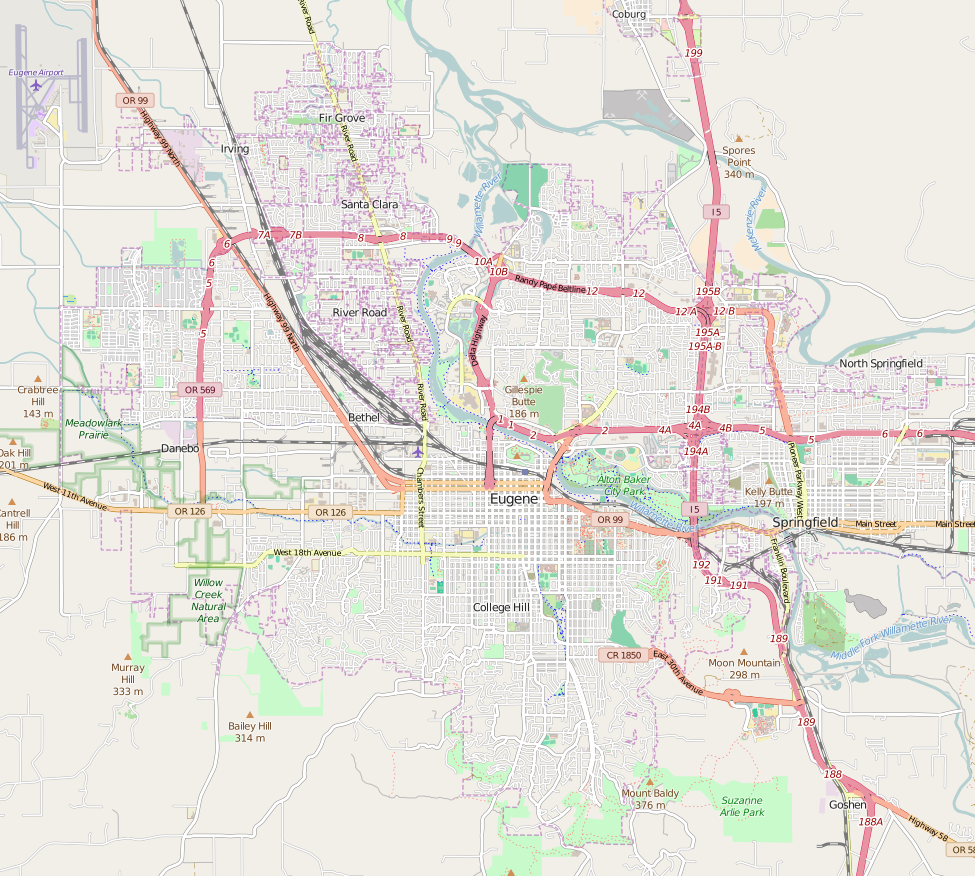
- Location within Eugene OR Location within Oregon
- Coordinates: 44°01′44″N 123°01′04″W

Dorris Ranch is a 268-acre (108-hectare) municipal park and commercial filbert orchard just south of downtown Springfield, Oregon, United States. It is operated by the Willamalane Park and Recreation District. The park's trails pass through riparian woodland and oak prairie habitats. The park also serves as the western access point of the paved, 4-mile-long Middle Fork mixed-use path, which runs to Clearwater Park.

Dorris Ranch is recognized as the first commercial filbert orchard (started in 1892) in the United States and is listed on the National Register of Historic Places. More than half of all the commercial filbert trees now growing in the U.S. originated from Dorris Ranch nursery stock.

== History ==
The property on which Dorris Ranch is located was originally settled in 1851 by the William Masterson family. The Masterson's 1857 house in Eugene is a city-designated landmark. In 1892, George Dorris and his wife Lulu bought the property. Willamalane park district has owned the site since 1972. The district conducts living history activities to teach students about the Kalapuya, Lewis and Clark, and the lifestyles of trappers and pioneers.

=== Orchard replacement ===
In November 2024, roughly 40 acres (16 hectares) of filbert trees were removed due to Eastern filbert blight. In January 2025, 3,500 blight-resistant filbert trees were planted.

== See also ==
- Benjamin Franklin Dorris House, NRHP-listed property associated with the Dorris family
- Dorris Apartments, NRHP-listed property associated with the Dorris family
- George Dorris, descendant of the Dorris family
- National Register of Historic Places listings in Lane County, Oregon
