= Caples House Museum =

Historic house in Oregon, United States

- Dr. Charles G. and Lucinda McBride Caples Farmstead
- U.S. National Register of Historic Places
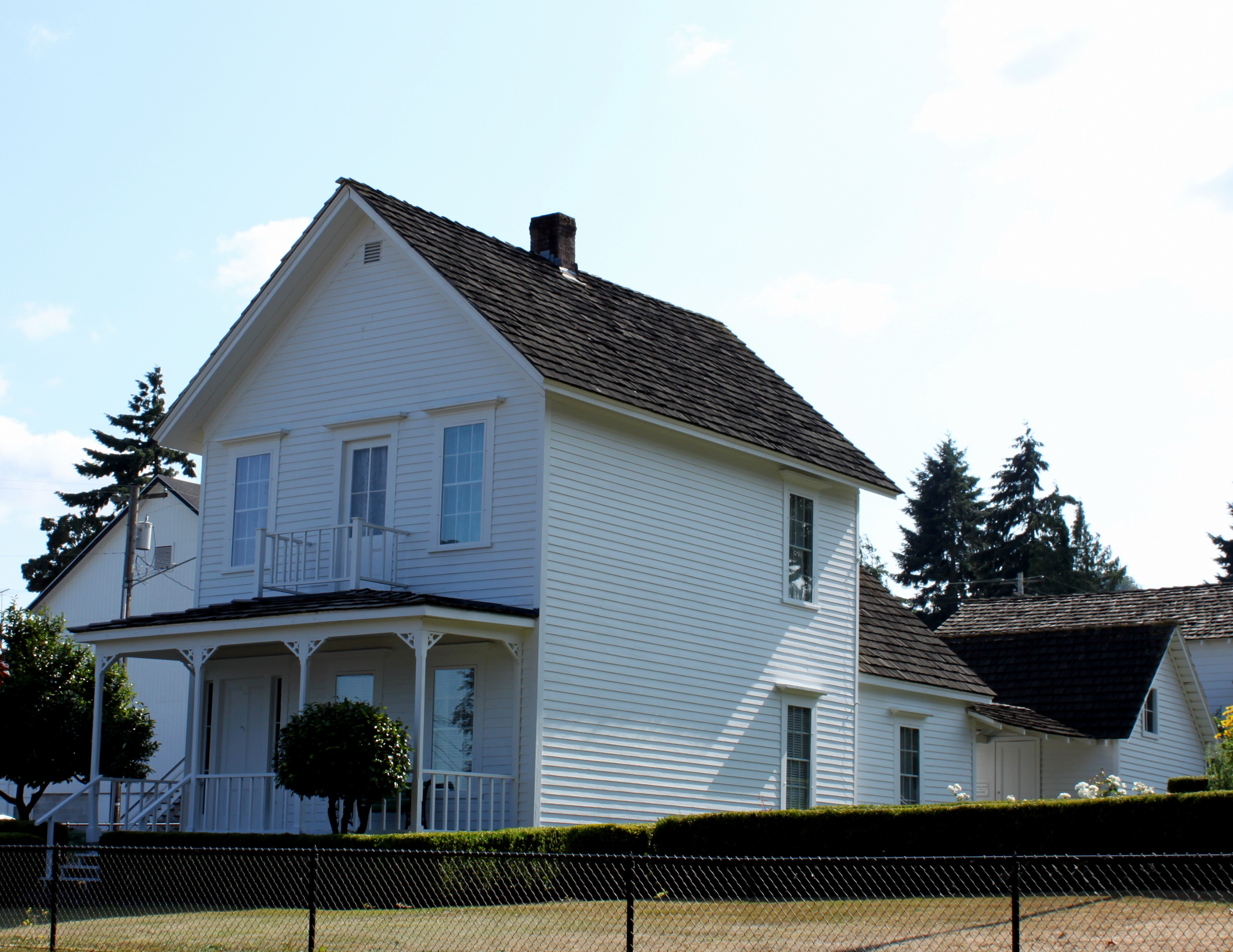
- The Caples house in 2009
- Location: 1925 1st Street; Columbia City, Oregon
- Coordinates: 45°53′25″N 122°48′29″W
- Area: Less than 1 acre (0.40 ha)
- Built: 1870
- Architectural style: Classical Revival
- NRHP reference No.: 05001060
- Added to NRHP: September 21, 2005

The Caples House Museum, also known as the Dr. Charles G. and Lucinda McBride Caples Farmstead, is a historic house museum in Columbia City, Oregon, United States. Dr. Charles Caples and Lucinda McBride Caples emigrated across the Oregon Trail as children and married in Oregon in 1855. Charles (1832–1906) was the first physician in Columbia County and built his home in 1870 during the early years of Columbia City. He and the Caples family made important contributions to the development of the town, including establishment of its first school. Lucinda (d. 1916) served as a midwife and her husband's medical assistant, and had family connections to many prominent Oregonians of the period. In 1959, the Caples' daughter, Dell Caples Houghton, bequeathed the house and its immediate surroundings to the Daughters of the American Revolution (DAR) for use as a museum. As of 2003, the property included the historic house, toolshed, and barn, a remnant portion of the Caples' historic apple and pear orchard, and four non-historic buildings including a gift shop and social hall. The house and toolshed remain in excellent historic condition.

The house was added to the National Register of Historic Places in 2005. The DAR continues to operate the property as a museum as of 2018.

== See also ==
- National Register of Historic Places listings in Columbia County, Oregon
