= Willamalane Park and Recreation District =

Government agency in Oregon, United States

Agency overview
- Formed: September 29, 1944
- Jurisdiction: Springfield, Oregon, Oregon
- Headquarters: 250 S. 32nd Street, Springfield, Oregon, 97478
- Employees: 327
- Annual budget: $12,748,741
- Agency executive: Michael Wargo, Executive Director
- Website: http://www.willamalane.org

Willamalane Park and Recreation District maintains and operates recreation facilities, community centers, pools, parks, trails, and natural areas in Springfield. In addition, the district provides recreational activities, volunteer opportunities, and childcare. Willamalane is a special tax district, separate from the City of Springfield, Oregon, governed by a five-member, elected board of directors and managed by an executive director

== Programs ==
Willamalane offers:

Programs for Kids

- Classes for all ages
- Kids Club after-school care
- Camps and no-school day care
- Swim lessons and recreation swims
- After-school sports programs
- Two50 youth center
- Preschool

Programs for Adults

- Classes ranging from dog obedience to art, language, cooking, moutdoors, dance and a full range of fitness classes.
- Water fitness
- Adaptive recreation for adults with disabilities

Major Special Events

- MEGGA Hunt, March or April, Lively Park
- Children's Celebration, July, Island Park
- Haunted Hayride, October, Dorris Ranch
- Turkey Stuffer, November, Lively Park

== Parks and Trails ==
Arrow Park, 2500 Otto St.

Bluebelle Park, 50th Place & Bluebelle Way

Bob Artz Memorial Park, 7807 Thurston Road. Baseball/softball diamonds.

By-Gully Bike/Jog Path, Mill Street, Anderson Lane

Clearwater Park, 2400 Clearwater Lane. Boat landing, fishing.

Dorris Ranch, 205 Dorris St. Historic filbert orchards, trails, fast forest, historic village with replica pioneer cabin, trapper's cabin and longhouse.

Douglas Gardens Park, 3455 S. Redwood Drive

Eastgate Woodlands/East Alton Baker Park, 512 Aspen St.

EWEB Path, Pioneer Parkway to 35th Street

Gamebird Park, 1500 Mallard Ave.

Georgia Pacific Natural Area, South of 3203 Jasper Road

Guy Lee Park, 890 Darlene Ave.

Harvest Landing, Harvest Lane

Island Park, 200 W. B St.

Jack B. Lively Memorial Park, 6100 Thurston Road. Picnic shelters, dog park, large playground, walking trail.

James Park, 4141 E. 19th Ave.

Jasper Meadows Park, 57th St.

Jesse Maine Memorial Park, South 69th Place

Kelly Butte Park Overlook, 937 Summit Blvd.

Marylhurst Park, 859 18th Street

Meadow Park, 851 Mill St.

Menlo Park, 1080 Cottonwood Ave.

Middle Fork Path, Clearwater Lane

Millrace Park, 200 S. Mill St.

Pacific Park, 2163 Shady Lane Dr.

Page Park, 1300 Hayden Bridge Road

Pride Park, 277 S. 34th St.

Quartz Park, 2300 S. 60th Ave.

Rob Adams Park, 890 Mountaingate Drive

Robin Park, 2950 Wayside Loop

Royal Delle Park, 401 Blackstone St.

Thurston Park, 6329 F St./747 64th St.

Thurston Hills Natural Area, 7575 McKenzie Highway

Tyson Park, 3405 E St.

Volunteer Park, 4350 Mt. Vernon Road

Wallace M. Ruff Jr. Memorial Park, 66th Street. Magnolia arboretum.

Weyerhaeuser McKenzie Natural Area, 3809 Marcola Road

West D Street Greenway, Aspen Street-Riverview Street

Willamalane Park, 1276 G St. Large playground. skate park.

Willamalane Sports Park, 400 S. 32nd St. Four lighted artificial turf sports fields and playground adjacent to Bob Keefer Center for Sports and Recreation.

Willamette Heights Park, 508 Valley View Ave.

William S. Fort Memorial Park, 300 58th St.

== Facilities ==
Bob Keefer Center for Sports and Recreation, 250 S. 32nd St. Three hardwood basketball courts, a new Fitness Center, new sport courts, climbing wall, bouldering wall, indoor tennis, youth center.

Willamalane Adult Activity Center, 215 W. C St. Computer center, wood shop, classrooms, stage and hundreds of programs aimed at adults 50 and older.

Splash at Lively Park, 6100 Thurston Road. Indoor wave pool with waterslide, kiddie pool, lap pool, adult spa.

Willamalane Park Swim Center, 1276 G St. Competition lap pool, diving, warm-water pool with waterslide.

Camp Putt Adventure Golf Park, 4006 Franklin Blvd. (privately owned, but operated by Willamalane)

== History ==
On Sept. 29, 1944, voters in Springfield, Oregon approved a proposal to organize Oregon's second special-purpose park and recreation district. Much of this was due to the pioneering efforts of then Lane County District Attorney William S. Fort. Its first fiscal year began the following July with Willamalane having neither a budget nor property. The district was first formed to serve a population of only 3,800 people. By the close of the 1940s, Springfield, had doubled in size to approximately 3 square miles and a population of nearly 10,000.

=== 1940s ===
Voters organize and pass a park and recreation district measure to encompass the Springfield and Maple School districts.

Walter Hansen becomes Willamalane's first superintendent in 1945. Irene Squires becomes Willamalane's superintendent in 1947.

First annual budget of $25,000 is proposed.

Willamalane Park and James Park are purchased. The former for approximately $200, the latter for $10.

Willamalane Park is developed with the aid of a $25,000 gift from the Booth-Kelly Lumber Company.

Board of Directors increases from three to five members.

=== 1950s ===
Veterans Memorial Association donates the uncompleted Memorial Building to Willamalane.

Willamalane Pool opens as an outdoor facility in 1951.

Clayton Anderson becomes Willamalane's superintendent in 1952.

The Willamalane Golden Age Club forms and continues into the 1980s, after the Willamalane Senior Adult Activity Center is built. The club is the only organized senior group in Oregon and provides the impetus for developing programs of interest to senior adults.

The first Program Guide is mailed to district patrons. It is a double-sided, one-page bulletin sponsored and printed by Weyerhaeuser.

A broken gas main near the Memorial Building causes a major gas explosion causing $10,000 in damage. The building custodian is hospitalized.

Willamalane's preschool program opens at the Memorial Building. Basketball, tennis, and other programs begin.

Grand opening of The Lounge, a center for teens. For a period in the 1960s, the lounge was known as the Sugar Shack.

District annexes area north to McKenzie River in the Wayside Lane and McKenzie Manor areas.

Additional annexation to the north and west increased district area by 20 percent.

Robin Park and Gamebird Park are donated to the district.

Willamalane acquires Island Park.

=== 1960s ===
Menlo Park, Guy Lee Park, and a portion of Bob Artz Memorial Park are donated to the District. Kelly Butte and Willamette Heights Park sites are acquired for $1 each from the city of Springfield. A portion of Island Park is acquired from Lane County, which includes the future site of the Senior Adult Activity Center.

Royal Delle Park opens in 1960.

Willamalane acquires 21 other park sites.

Willamalane Park Pool cover construction begins.

Mushball leagues are formed and continue for 14 years until the switch in the 1970s to slow pitch softball.

Willamalane Swim Club beats world record for marathon swim — 103 miles in 66 consecutive hours (the equivalent of the distance from Willamalane Pool to Portland).

Willamalane Art League goes independent and becomes the Emerald Empire Arts and Crafts Association.

First Willamalane egg hunt.

Robert Artz becomes Willamalane's superintendent in 1960. Robert Haworth becomes Willamalane's superintendent in 1967. Gary Walker becomes Willamalane's superintendent in 1969.

The mayor of Springfield appoints committee to explore the feasibility of city operation of the park district; however, studies show that funding and services would be reduced.

=== 1970s ===
In 1970, Springfield's population stands at 26,874, more than a 100 percent increase from 1950.

Willamalane creates the first after-school recreation programs at Maple and Brattain elementary schools.

Senior Citizens' Advisory Council is formed and senior programs are expanded. The Senior Adult Activity Center is completed.

District purchases the Dorris Ranch property and the north portion of Island Park.

New recreation programs are introduced to meet the needs of swing-shift workers. Late-night sports leagues are formed (basketball, bowling, and softball) that practice and play between 11 p.m. and 4 a.m.

Willamalane Diving Club member Mark Bradshaw sets a new division record at the Oregon Junior Olympic Diving Championships and, at the Oregon Indoor Diving Championships, he is named the "Most Outstanding Male Diver in Oregon."

Major remodeling and renovation begin at Willamalane Pool.

Voters approve an annexation of the east end of Springfield. Willamalane's service district increases in size by more than 50 percent.

=== 1980s ===
Survey shows that twice as many people use Senior Adult Activity Center as originally anticipated.

Thurston Park property site is donated.

Fire causes $75,000 in damage to the Memorial Building. Building is renovated and rededicated.

Daniel Plaza becomes Willamalane's superintendent in 1982.

District acquires Jack B. Lively Memorial Park land at South 34th Street.

In 1989 Lively Park Swim Center (later called Splash! at Lively Park) opens to the public. It is the first indoor wave pool in the Northwest.

In 1985, Springfield, Ore. celebrates its centennial.

In 1986 Willamalane wins the National Gold Medal Award as the outstanding park and recreation department in the United States in the 20,000-50,000 population category.

The National Register of Historic Places lists Dorris Ranch in its registry.

=== 1990s ===
Willamalane Pool bathhouse renovation is completed. The facility reopens and is renamed Willamalane Park Swim Center.

The Teen Center opens with coordination of the district, the city of Springfield, Ore., concerned citizens and interested teens.

Willamalane co-sponsors the first annual Filbert Festival, held at Island Park.

The district's first annual Haunted Hayride is held at Dorris Ranch.

A vintage 1910 house (Tomseth House) was given to the Dorris Ranch Foundation for relocation to Dorris Ranch as on-site offices.

Clearwater Park is acquired from Lane County.

Wallace M. Ruff Jr. Memorial Park and Pierce Park land are donated to the district.

Willamalane acquires West D Street Greenway and East Alton Baker Park/Eastgate Woodlands.

Willamalane purchases two acres for Jesse Maine Memorial Park.

Willamalane acquires 11 acres on 79th Street from Springfield School District in Bob Artz Memorial Park trade.

Voters reject a bond measure to replace the failing roof at Willamalane Pool. The facility is closed due to flood damage in the pool tank and rain damage to the roof structure. A few months later, voters approve a bond measure to replace the pool roof by a margin of 63 percent. However, fewer than 50 percent of the electorate cast ballots and the vote is ruled invalid. As a result, the pool roof is removed and facility opens as an outdoor pool. The following winters, voters approve a bond measure to replace the pool roof and make other improvements.

=== 2000s ===
Bob Keefer becomes Willamalane's superintendent in 2000.

Willamalane Park Swim Center reopens as an indoor facility.

The skatepark at Willamalane Park is completed and the grand opening ceremony gets a visit from internationally acclaimed Tony Hawk and his crew.

East Alton Baker Park is renamed The Whilamut Natural Area of East Alton Baker Park, honoring the Kalapuya people and their language.

In 2004 Morrisette Field is dedicated and opens at the 32nd Street Community Sports Park. It is the first artificial turf sports field in Springfield.

The district broke ground on a new community center at this site. The center will replace the Memorial Building Community Center and the Administration Center.

Willamalane's 20-year Comprehensive Plan secures approval, charting a course for parks and recreation in Springfield for the next 20 years.

Volunteers construct a replica pioneer cabin at Dorris Ranch, similar to the cabin that housed Oregon Trail pioneers William and Eliza Masterson when they first homesteaded the property in the 1850s. The project is followed by the construction of a smithy, a trapper's cabin and a longhouse.

Willamalane purchases the former Regional Sports Center. A remodeled 97,000-square-foot building is named Willamalane Center for Sports and Recreation.

Willamalane constructs the first phases of the Middle Fork Path, which runs along the Middle Fork of the Willamette River from Clearwater Park to Dorris Ranch.

Springfield Public Schools leases the Memorial Building and offers alternative and special education classes.

== See also ==
- Hayden Bridge (Springfield, Oregon)
