= Tamástslikt Cultural Institute =

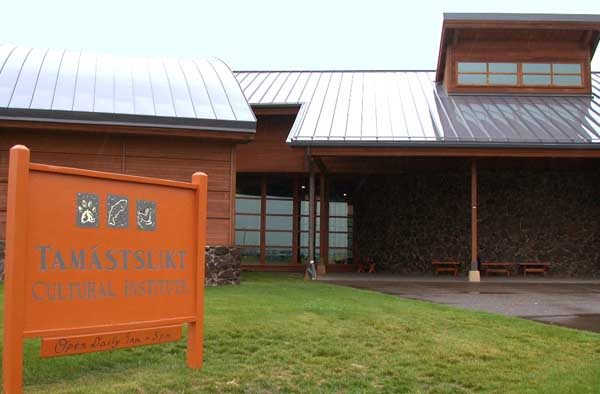
- Tamástslikt Cultural Institute
- Established: 1998
- Location: Pendleton, Oregon, United States
- Coordinates: 45.650953°N 118.670951°W
- Type: Cultural museum
- Director: Roberta Conner
- Curator: Randall Melton
- Website: http://www.tamastslikt.org/

The Tamástslikt Cultural Institute is a museum and research institute located on the Umatilla Indian Reservation near Pendleton in eastern Oregon. It is the only Native American museum along the Oregon Trail. The institute is dedicated to the culture of the Cayuse, Umatilla, and Walla Walla tribes of Native Americans. The main permanent exhibition of the museum provides a history of the culture of three tribes, and of the reservation itself. The museum also has a second hall for temporary exhibitions of specific types of Native American art, craftwork, history, and folklore related to the tribes.

== History ==
The widely celebrated Oregon Trail sesquicentennial in 1993 served as a platform for the Confederated Tribes of the Umatilla Indian Reservation to present their vision for the future, and convey their interpretation of the past. The original proposal for the Tamástslikt Cultural Institute site detailed a $13 million Oregon Trail interpretive center that would “tell the story of the Oregon Trail from a Native American perspective,” and be an economic and cultural stimulus. The Tribes anticipated the interpretive center to increase local investments and create “more than 800 full-time jobs.” The initial funding strategy included federal funds, local fund raising, grants, video poker profits, and “the commitment of timber from the U.S. Forest Service,” in constructing the interpretive center. After three years of lobbying, the Confederated Tribes were denied federal funding on the basis that the Interior Department's budget did not "include any money for Indian interpretive centers.” Shortly after the decision, the Oregon Legislature allocated a minimum of “$666,000 in lottery funds” to the construction of the Oregon Trail Interpretive center.

The Confederated Tribes of the Umatilla Indian Reservation presented a living history exhibit during the summer of 1993 at Fallen Field, in order to share Native American history and culture that predated the Oregon Trail. On August 12, 1993, “the Oregon Trail Sesquicentennial wagon train was stopped by Indians on horseback at the east boundary of the Umatilla Indian Reservation,” in order to draw attention to the lack of federal funding for the Tribes’ Oregon Trail interpretive center. Antone Minthorn, the chairman of the General Council for the Confederated Tribes of the Umatilla Indian Reservation, spoke to those on the Wagon Train and the gathered crowd. In his speech, he noted that the Tribes “raised more than $4 million – more than the three companion trail projects in Baker City, The Dalles and Oregon City combined,” all of which received federal funding. Minthorn's speech focused on the importance of the proposed interpretive center to the Tribes and surrounding area:

Our vision was to create an interpretive center, telling the Tribes’ story to visitors from all over the world. This vision calls for not only exhibits, but also for an on-going center of learning and research for Indians and non-Indians for all time ... It is difficult to overstate the importance of this project to both the Tribe and this region as a whole. The Umatilla Tribes currently are attempting to deal with an unemployment rate of 28 per cent, and an average annual income of $8,000.

Minthorn's symbolic protest called for “nation-wide support” in presenting “a different perspective of Manifest Destiny.”

In December 1993, the plans for the circular interpretive center were unveiled. Created by exhibit designer Jean Jacques Andre, the permanent exhibit planned to “focus on the Tribes before the white man’s arrival, the current reservation and the tribe’s vision for the future,” and include a section on the Oregon Trail “and its impacts on the tribal way of life.” The original funding strategy evolved to include private funding, and the Tribes used illustrated plans for the interpretive center to increase support.

In May 1994, Representative Bob Smith endorsed the interpretive center, and testified before the House Appropriations Subcommittee on Interior “in support of a $2 million request for the Oregon Trail Interpretive Center on the Umatilla Indian Reservation.” Community support efforts continued, and on September 14, 1994, the East Oregonian printed a full page description of the Tamustalik Cultural Institute, which included sketches and contribution information. The same month, a “$6.5 million loan guarantee by the Bureau of Indian Affairs” provided the financial backing the Tribes needed to move forward on construction. On June 9, 1995, a ground-breaking ceremony was held for the Tamustalik Cultural Institute, which was attended by over 300 people. As reported by the Confederated Umatilla Journal, the ceremony “was performed by Tribal elders and students from the Tribes’ Head Start Preschool Program. Special drums were made for the boys, who were led in a song by Jay Minthorn. The girls broke ground with miniature root diggers, made especially for the occasion.” The building site was later prepared by the Oregon National Guard. Roberta Conner was announced as the first director of Tamástslikt Cultural Institute in February of 1998, and oversaw the final preparations of the institute. After ten years of planning, a “special opening ceremony was held July 24 for the tribal community, which then had a week to explore its new facility before the doors opened to the public July 31.” Within the first three weeks of opening, approximately 4,000 people visited the Tamástslikt Cultural Institute.

== Naming ==
The site was initially to be named The Oregon Trail on the Umatilla Indian Reservation Interpretive Institute. Tribal elders deliberated, and decided a shorter name would be more practical. The name Tamásclikt, from the Walla Walla North East Sahaptin dialect, was suggested by Átway Celia Bearchum.

Tamásclik, a verb, means to “turn over,” as in the turning of the seasons, or years. The English spelling is Tamástslik, and the addition of a ‘t’ to the end changes the word from a verb to a name. Linguist Dr. Noel Rude made an orthographic correction to the name. The final product was the name Tamástslikt (Tuh-must-slickt), which means “interpreting our own story.”

== Mission ==
The mission of the Tamástslikt Cultural Institute is “To preserve and perpetuate the diverse cultures and histories of the indigenous people now known as the Cayuse, Umatilla and Walla Walla Tribes,” and “To educate people about our cultures, histories and contemporary lives.”

== Facilities ==
The Tamástslikt Cultural Institute is a 45,000 square foot building constructed with “native stone and wood.” The institute includes 15,000 square feet of permanent and temporary exhibit space. Additional on-site facilities include archive vaults, the Research Library, the Museum Store, the Kinship Café, and designated meeting areas.

=== Meeting areas ===
There are five designated meeting areas accessible by the public within the Tamástslikt Cultural Institute: the Gallery, the Classroom (694 usable square feet), the Conference Room (305 usable square feet), the Multipurpose Theater (1600 usable square feet), and the Celilo Lobby (2300 usable square feet). The Coyote Theater projects a short gallery introduction which is led by the guide “Spilyáy, the magical coyote.” The Celilo Lobby is "a basalt-lined circular lobby featuring a floor-to-ceiling mural of Celilo Falls."

== Collections ==
In 2003, the Tamástslikt Cultural Institute had “more than 2,500 artifacts in its collection area," which are stored in multiple vaults and the Research Library. In 2011, Tamástslikt Cultural Institute added "five artifact donations and 220 books to the collection" and received "Dr. Theodore Stern archival materials on long-term loan from University of Oregon Special Collections." Collections include baskets, lithics, regalia, glass plates, audio and video recordings, local and tribal newspapers, genealogical and obituary records on tribal members, papers, books, historic and contemporary photographs, and modern artwork and beadwork from community members.

== Special events ==
The Tamástslikt Cultural Institute holds Kids Day Camps, Craft Lessons, a Community Academy, Kids Powwows, and other special events on a seasonal basis. Tamástslikt also frequently hosts guest lectures that range from related museum work to sustainability and economics.

== Conservation and sustainability ==
The Tamástslikt Cultural Institute participates in conservation efforts and strives for sustainability. Early in 2011, the Kinship Café “renounced Styrofoam” and committed to the use of biodegradable containers. Past improvements to the facility include the sealing of soffit vents, the installation of energy usage monitors, energy efficient lighting, and motion-activated fixtures, and the decentralization of large boilers. During the ten-year span from 2003 to 2013, the Tamástslikt Cultural Institute “successfully reduced electrical usage by 55% and natural gas usage by 75%.”

Tamástslikt Cultural Institute subscribes to the triple bottom line, or “people, planet, and profit” approach put forth by John Elkington.

=== Wind turbine ===
A 50 kilowatt wind turbine is to be constructed in 2013. The turbine will be funded by “grant money from Pacific Power’s Blue Sky Fund and Oregon’s wind energy incentives,” and “will be congruent with Confederated Tribes of the Umatilla Indian Reservation wind policy – which is against wind farms but for wind power.”

== Museum governance ==
The Tamástslikt Cultural Institute is "tribally owned and operated" by the Confederated Tribes of the Umatilla Indian Reservation, which totaled 2,860 enrolled members at the close of 2011.

== Collaborations and auxiliary projects ==
=== National Park Service ===
The Tamástslikt Cultural Institute “collaborated with the National Park Service and their contractors on new film projects for Whitman Mission National Historic Site, Nez Perce National Historic Park, and Big Hole National Battlefield,” and “began agreement to provide long term storage for Frenchtown Historic Site artifacts” in 2011.

=== Homeland Heritage Oregon Trail maps ===
The Cayuse, Umatilla and Walla Walla Homeland Heritage Corridor map was developed by the Tamastslikt Cultural Institute. The institute published 300,000 maps in 2011.

=== Confederated Tribes of the Umatilla Indian Reservation ===
In conjunction with the Confederated Tribes of the Umatilla Indian Reservation, the Tamástslikt Cultural Institute is contributing to efforts to rename Oregon places containing the word “squaw” with indigenous names.

== Reciprocal partnerships ==
In 2005, the Tamástslikt Cultural Institute “entered into reciprocal membership agreements” with the Oregon Historical Society and Washington State Historical Society, which extends “free admission to their museums for members of any one of the respective institutions.” This agreement was made in honor of the Lewis and Clark bicentennial and Walla Walla Treaty Council sesquicentennial. The museums collaborated previously in 2001 to develop a Dale Chihuly exhibit, and participated in artifact loans.

== Gallery ==
Tamástslikt Logo

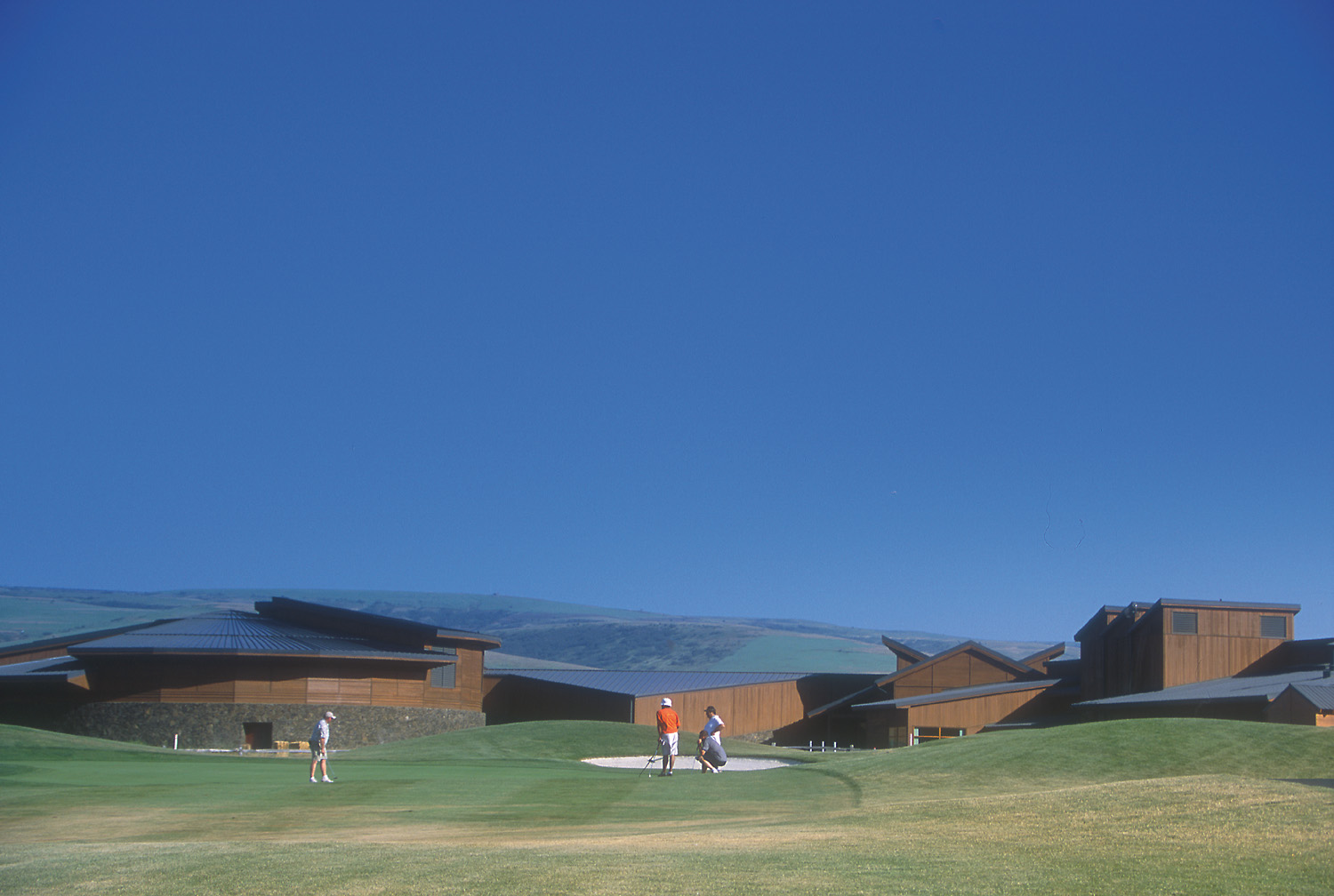
The Tamástslikt Cultural Institute
