= Patrick Hughes House =

Historic house in Oregon, United States

- U.S. National Register of Historic Places
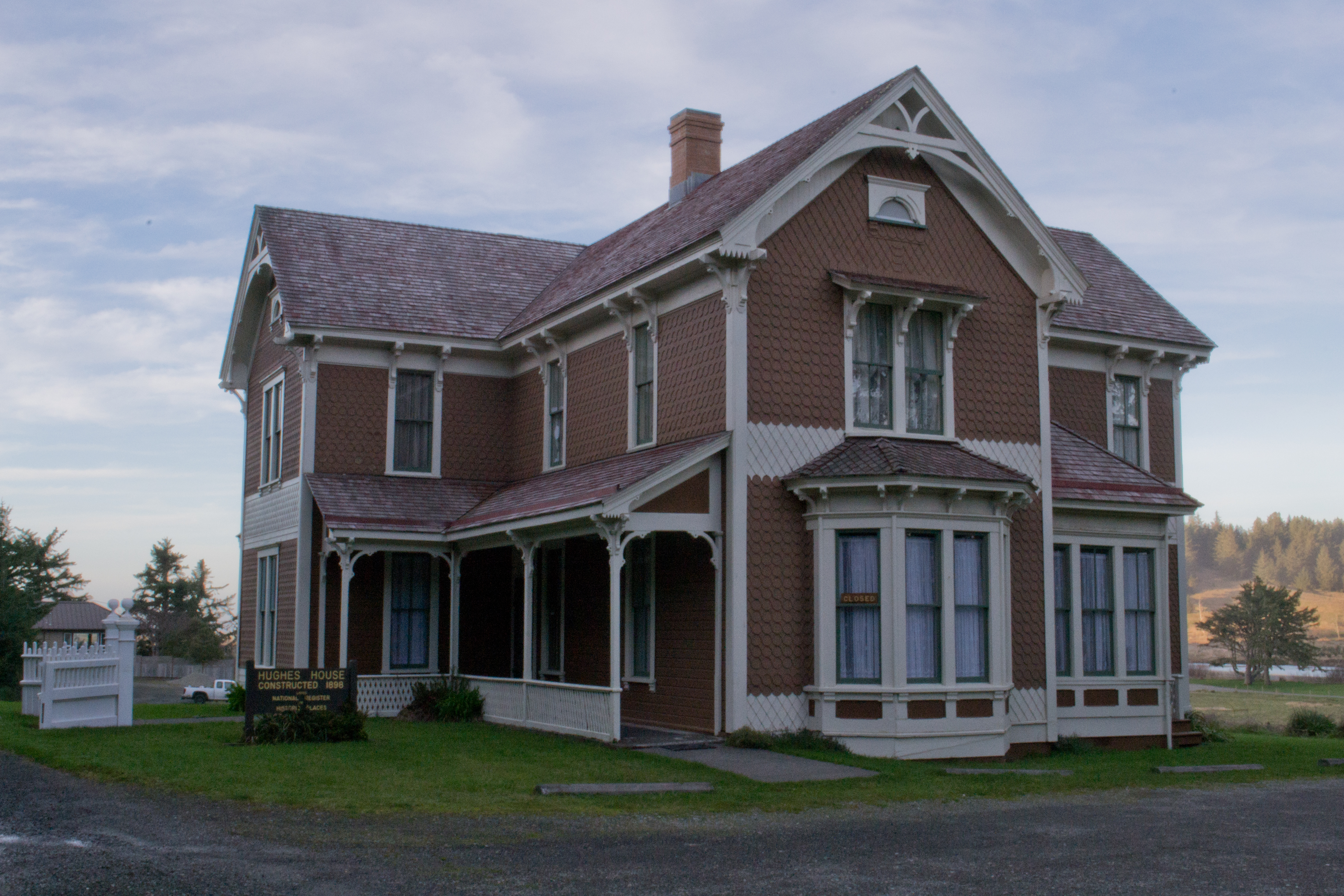
- Patrick Hughes House in 2012

- Location within Oregon Location within the United States
- Nearest city: Sixes, Oregon
- Coordinates: 42°50′33″N 124°32′13″W
- Area: 2.5 acres (1.0 ha)
- Built: 1898
- Built by: Peter John Lindberg
- Architect: Peter John Lindberg
- Architectural style: Stick/Eastlake, Queen Anne
- NRHP reference No.: 80003310
- Added to NRHP: November 28, 1980

The Patrick Hughes House, also known as Hughes Ranch and the Historic Hughes House, is a historic Queen Anne-style house built in 1898 on Cape Blanco in the U.S. state of Oregon. The Hughes family owned over 2,000 acres (810 ha) and operated a dairy farm on Cape Blanco.

It is now operated as a historic house museum by the Cape Blanco Heritage Society.

The house was added to the National Register of Historic Places in 1980.
