= Thomas J. Flippin House =

Historic house in Oregon, United States

- U.S. National Register of Historic Places
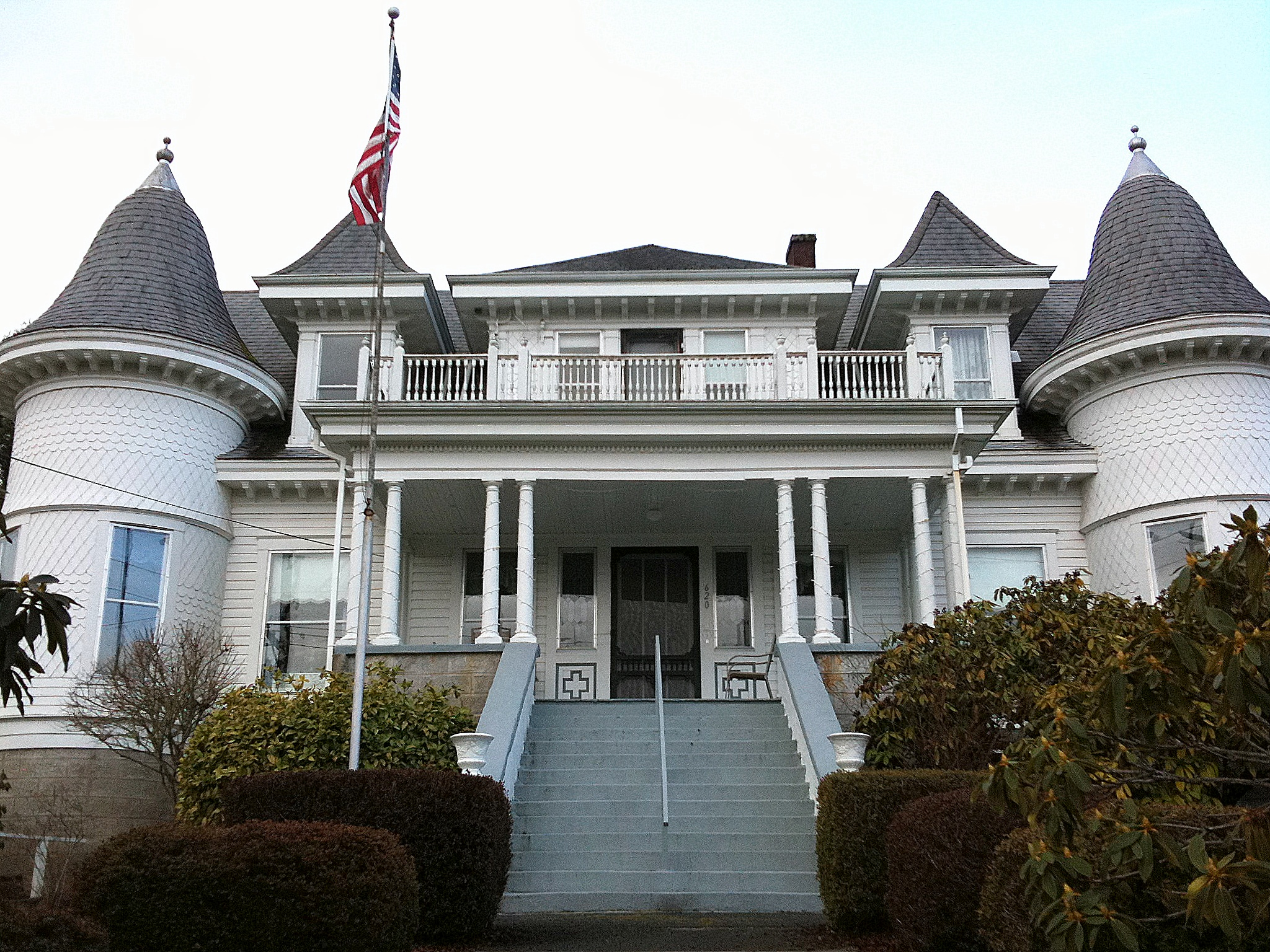
- Location: 620 Tichenor Street; Clatskanie, Oregon
- Coordinates: 46°06′03″N 123°12′28″W
- Built: 1900
- Architectural style: Queen Anne Shingle Style
- NRHP reference No.: 79002048
- Added to NRHP: March 7, 1979

The Thomas J. Flippin House, also known as the Clatskanie Castle or simply The Castle by some and the Flippin Castle by others, is a 14-room, shingle-style Queen Anne structure in Clatskanie, Oregon. The house was commissioned in 1898 by Thomas J. Flippin, son of Oregon pioneers and founder of the West Oregon Lumber Company. The San Andreas, California, firm of Markwell and Sons built the house, covered in hand-cut shingles made by a brother of Thomas Flippin. The Flippin family occupied the home even before construction ended in 1900.

Thomas Flippin had begun his lumber career as a skid greaser on a bull-team skid row, and the completion of his new home represented not only a perch above the town of Clatskanie but also a place above local society. The Flippins were not happy in their new home, and remained there only three years before vacating the house and ending their marriage. The house passed through several hands and served as an apartment building prior to being restored. It was added to the National Register of Historic Places in 1979.

== See also ==
- National Register of Historic Places listings in Columbia County, Oregon
