= Favell Museum =

Native American museum in Oregon

- Favell Museum of Western Art and Indian Artifacts
- Location in Oregon
- Established: April 15, 1972
- Location: 125 West Main Street; Klamath Falls, Oregon, U.S.
- Coordinates: 42.2222°N 121.7865°W
- Type: Western art, Native American history
- Collections: Over 100,000 Native American artifacts; contemporary Western art; miniature firearms collection
- Collection size: 100,000+ items
- Founders: Gene and Winifred Favell
- Architect: Nina Pence
- Owner: Favell Museum Inc. (Non-profit)
- Parking: On-site surface lot
- Website: favellmuseum.org

The Favel Museum (also known as the Favel Museum of Western Art and Indian Artifacts) is a Native American and contemporary Western Art museum located in Klamath Falls, Oregon.

== Founders ==
The museum is named after Gene and Winifred Favel, the founders of the Favel Museum.

=== Gene Favell ===
Gene Favell was born in Lakeview, Oregon. He served as an electronics technician's mate in the United States Navy from 1944 to 1947. He later attended Stanford University, graduating with a bachelor's degree in economics and a minor in American history. Favell died at his home in Klamath Falls on July 13, 2001.

=== Winifred Favell ===
Winifred Favel was born Winifred Lamm in Chiloquin, Oregon. She graduated from Klamath Union High School and earned a bachelor's degree from Stanford University, where she met Gene Favell. She died in Medford, Oregon, on October 20, 2024.

== Collection ==
Items in the museum's collection are drawn from the indigenous tribes from North and South America including items from the Nicolarsen Cave excavation. The museum has over 100,000 artifacts, some dating back 12,000 years ago The collection is broken up into:

- Native American Artifacts: Includes a range of stone tools and weapons, such as arrowheads, obsidian knives, and spear points. The centerpiece is a Fire Opal Arrowhead, which was found in Nevada's Black Rock Desert in 1910.
- Contemporary Western Art: Includes work from over 300 major Western artists that document landscapes and people of the American frontier. Major Artists include Charles M. Russell, John Clymer, and Frank McCarthy. A significant collection involves miniature paintings and sculptures which depict wildlife, landscapes, and pioneer life.
- Specialized Collections: The Favell Museum is home to a collection of miniature firearms. These are functional weapons with live ammunition.
- Public Galleries: A year-round space that features regional artists, original paintings, and sculptures for purchase.

== Operations ==
The Favell Museum operates as a non-profit organization and does not receive government subsidies. Funding for its operations is primarily generated through a membership program, gift shop revenue, and art sales.
