= John M. Moyer House =

Historic house in Oregon, United States

- U.S. National Register of Historic Places
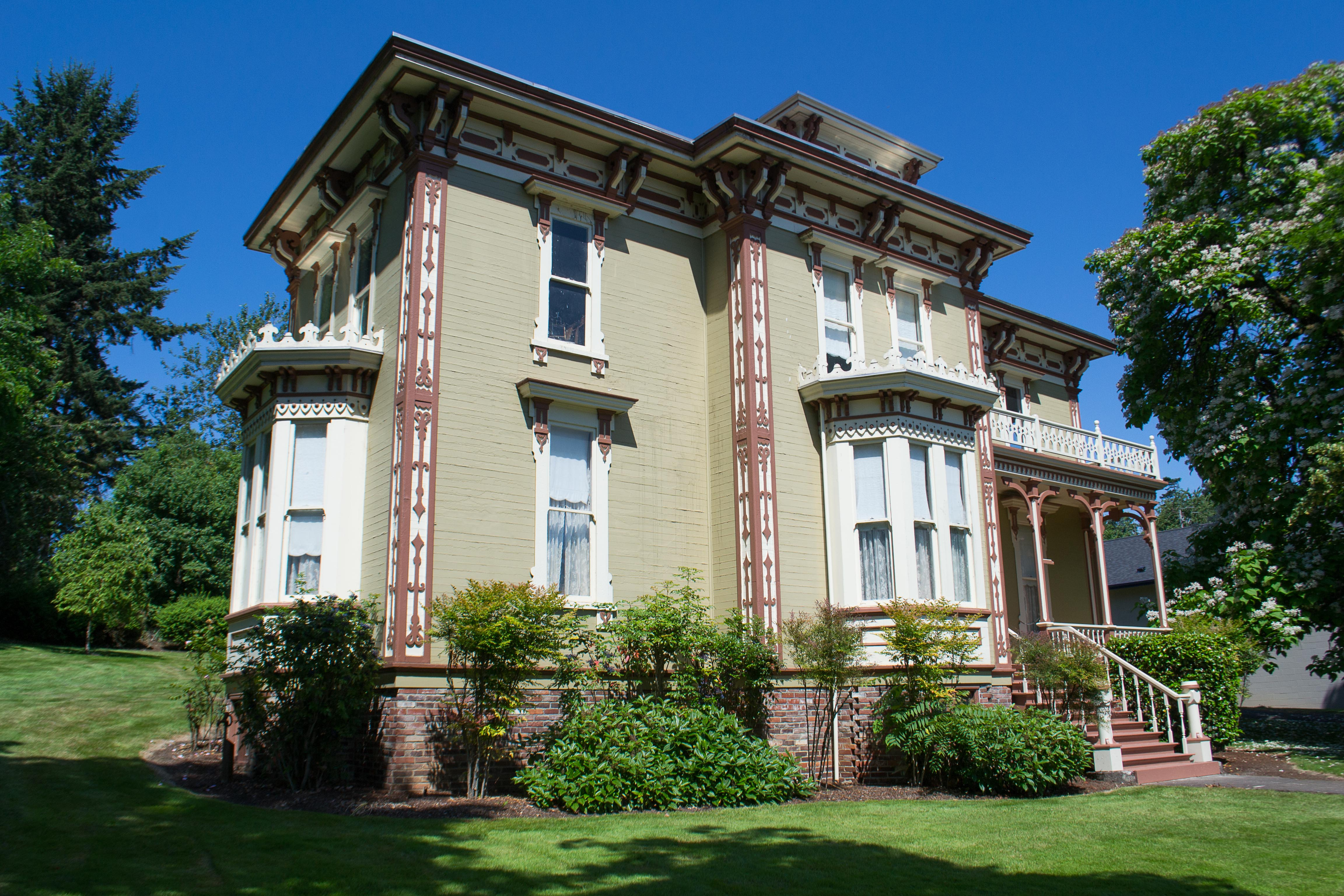

- Location within Oregon Location within the United States
- Location: 204 Main St., Brownsville, Oregon
- Coordinates: 44°23′35″N 122°59′3″W
- Area: 0.7 acres (0.28 ha)
- Built: 1881
- Built by: Moyer, John M.
- Architectural style: Italian Villa
- NRHP reference No.: 74001693
- Added to NRHP: January 21, 1974

The 1881 John M. Moyer House was built by Linn County, Oregon, pioneer John Moyer. The house was donated to the Linn County Historical Society in 1962 under a grant from the Hill Family Foundation. The Society has furnished the house with late 19th-century Victorian pieces and offers tours on weekends.

In 1974 the Moyer House was placed on the National Register of Historic Places.

A carpenter by trade, Moyer began planning the house in 1878 in the Italian villa style. George F. Colbert, a friend of Moyer, helped with construction.
