= Kathrin Cawein Gallery of Art =

Coordinates: 45°31′17″N 123°06′30″W

The Kathrin Cawein Gallery of Art, named in honor of the artist, Kathrin Cawein, is an Oregon artistic institution affiliated with Pacific University in Forest Grove, Oregon.
