= Vernonia Pioneer Museum =

- Oregon–American Lumber Company Mill Office
- U.S. National Register of Historic Places
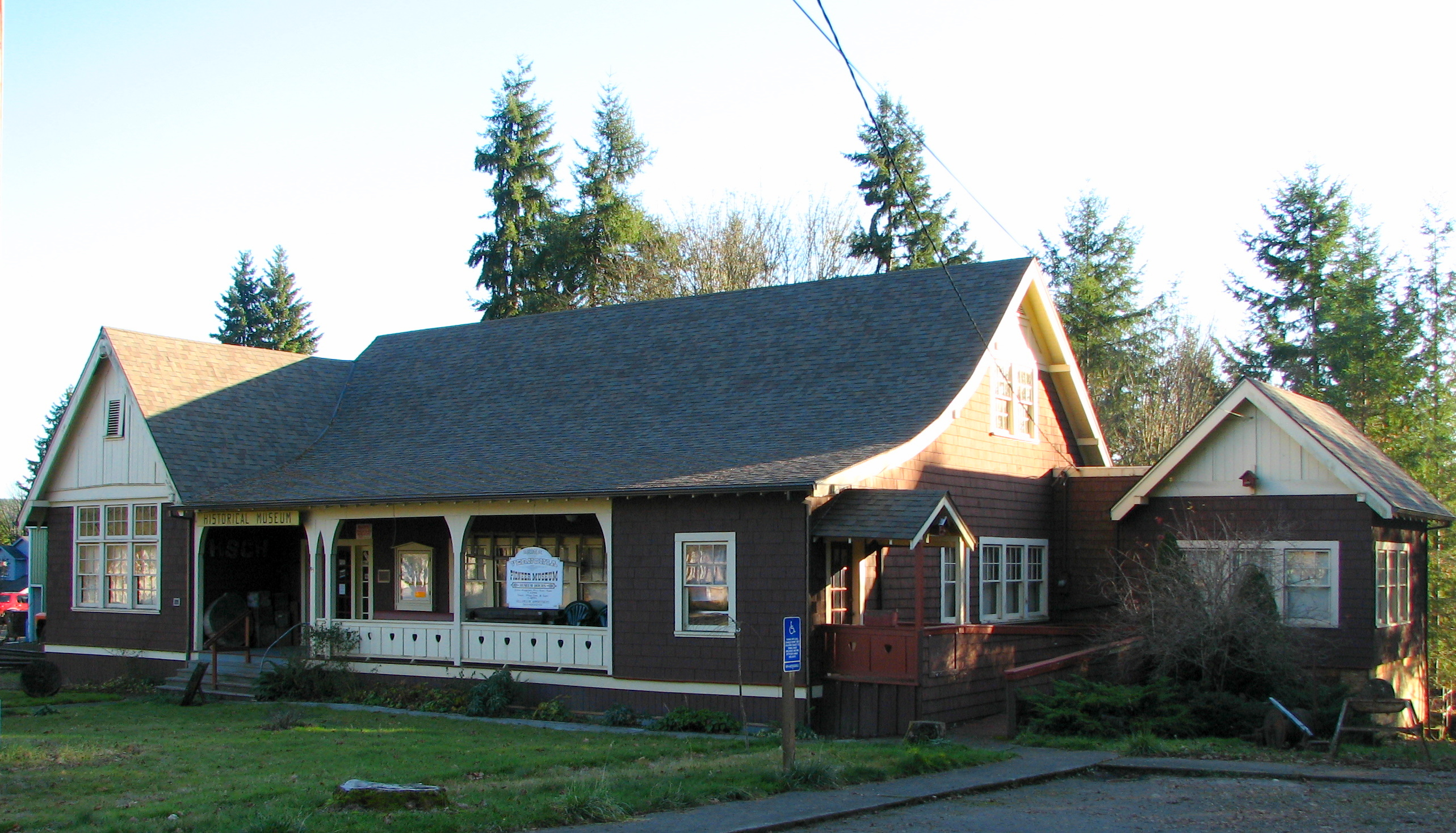
- Location: 511 E. Bridge Street; Vernonia, Oregon
- Coordinates: 45°51′26″N 123°10′52″W
- Built: ca. 1924
- Architectural style: Craftsman bungalow
- NRHP reference No.: 02001485
- Added to NRHP: December 5, 2002

The Vernonia Pioneer Museum is a history museum, located in Vernonia, Oregon, United States. The building that houses the museum is listed on the National Register of Historic Places as the Oregon–American Lumber Company Mill Office.
