= Kathrin Cawein =

American printmaker

- Born: May 9, 1895; New London, Connecticut
- Died: 1996
- Education: Art Students League of New York
- Known for: Etching
- Movement: Realism

Kathrin Cawein (1895–1996) was an American printmaker known for her etchings. Her style was realist and her subjects were mainly landscapes and interiors. Early in her career, her work received praise from one critic for its "adroit handling of color and good drawing — a technique that seems to express personal engaging conceptions." Critics also considered her prints to be "striking" and having a "high level of workmanship."

== Artistic career ==
Between 1927 and 1932 Cawein was a student at the Art Students League of New York where the prominent etchers, Joseph Pennell and Harry Wickey were instructors. During this time she joined the Philadelphia Society of Etchers and, in 1930, participated in its annual exhibition at the Philadelphia Print Club. Her first year out of school was an unusually busy one. Late in 1932 she had participated in a two-person exhibition in the parish house of a church in her hometown, and during the following year her work appeared in group exhibitions at the Cronyn & Lowndes Galleries (Manhattan), the Art Students League (Manhattan), Grant Studios (Brooklyn), and, under the auspices of the Arts and Crafts Guild, at Westchester County Center (White Plains). Writing in the New York Evening Post, Margaret Breuning said Cawein's prints in the Cronyn & Lowndes show revealed "an adroit handling of color and good drawing — a technique that seems to express personal engaging conceptions." The Art Students League exhibition was one she had herself organized. In addition to some of her own prints it contained more than 200 prints in a variety of styles and media by a large group of artists, including Gifford Beal, John Sloan, Peggy Bacon, Anne Goldthwaite, Reginald Marsh, and Warren Chappell. (Note: Other participants in the show that Cawein arranged included Cecil C. Bell (printmaker and illustrator), Ilse Bischoff, Ernesto de Blanck (son of the Cuban musician couple Hubert and Olga de Blanck), Eugene C. Fitsch (French-born illustrator, set designer, and theater artist), Virginia Lee Kiser (painter and etcher), and Margery Ryerson (painter known for her portraits of children).)

Kathrin Cawein, South Window, etching, about 1934, 8 x 6 inches

Kathrin Cawein, Telegraph Hill, San Francisco in 1859, drypoint on paper, about 1936, 7 x 11 7/8 inches

Kathrin Cawein, Gurgling Rillo, etching, about 1935, 15 x 19 inches

Her pace hardly slackened over the next few years. From the end of 1933 through the beginning of 1937 she participated in shows at the Art Institute of Chicago, the Philadelphia Print Club, the Roerich Museum, the National Arts Club, the New York Water-Color Club, the Texas Centennial Exposition, and six other venues. (Note: The event at the Art Institute of Chicago was a juried show called the International Exhibition of Contemporary Prints held in conjunction with the Chicago World's Fair. The six other venues were American Society of Etchers, the Temporary Galleries of the Municipal Arts Committee (exhibition space provided to New York artists by the city at no charge) Arts Guild of North Riding (White Plains, New York), the Federation of Westchester County Artists (New York), the Philadelphia Society of Etchers, Northwest Printmakers (Seattle), and the 8th Street Playhouse.) She continued to show during the remainder of career, but notices of exhibitions were much less common in those years. (Note: A search made on January 16, 2019, in a well-regarded database of newspapers from New York and neighboring states returned only four articles on exhibitions of Cawein's work after 1936. These were a 1944 joint exhibition at Free World House (a facility in Greenwich Village sponsored by the Free World Association, dedicated to furthering collective security and supporting the Atlantic Charter), the annual exhibition of the National Association of Women Artists (1947), and two shows sponsored by the Westchester Federation of Women's Clubs, one in 1950), and the other in 1952.)

Cawein's early work earned awards. Her 1934 etching "South Window" (shown at left) appeared in a juried show called the International Exhibition of Contemporary Prints, held at the Art Institute of Chicago in conjunction with the Chicago World's Fair. In 1936 her drypoint, "Telegraph Hill, San Francisco, in 1869" (shown at right) won the Frederick Talcott Prize, an award given annually by the Society of American Etchers for the best print by a non-member to be shown at its annual exhibition. In 1944 her drypoint sketch, "Uncle Clarence's Barn, Fairfield, N.Y." received honorable mention in the annual exhibition put on by the National Association of Women Artists. In 1947 an etching of Cawein's won an award at the 55th Annual Exhibition of the National Association of Women Artists.

Cawein seems not to have sold her prints through commercial dealers, instead taking advantage of shows held by non-profit organizations where works on display were offered for sale. Over the years, she became a member of quite a few associations that served this purpose. Her memberships included the Society of American Etchers, National Association of Woman Artists, Chicago Society of Etchers, Philadelphia Society of Etchers, Society of Graphic Artists, and Art Students League.

Although primarily known for her etchings, Cawein also worked in other print media including drypoint, aquatint and woodcut and also made drawings and pastels. Her subjects were mainly landscapes and interiors, only occasionally including figures. Critics considered her prints to be "striking" and having a "high level of workmanship." Her etching "Gurgling Rillo" (shown at left) was said to employ light and shadow in a manner that "surpasses photographic technic and tells a story."

== Personal life ==
Kathrin Cawein, Pleasantville, etching, about 1935, 8 1/2 x 6 1/4 inches

Cawein's father was Henry Cawein, born May 1857 in Pfalz, Bavaria. Her mother was Barbara Franz Cawein, born July 1857 in the same place. They were married on November 14, 1878, in a Protestant ceremony in a Bavarian church. Henry Cawein died soon after the couple emigrated to New York City in about 1879.

Cawein had a brother John A. Cawein (also known as Albert), born September 14, 1880, in Manhattan, died November 20, 1956, and a sister, Olga E. Cawein, born February 1890 in New London, Connecticut. Olga married Henry W. (Harry) Flechsenhaar on May 12, 1917.

During the years from 1911 to 1920 Cawein and her sister lived with their widowed mother in the Bronx and worked as piano roll editors. In 1920 Cawein and her mother moved from the Bronx to live with Olga, and Olga's husband in a house on Bear Ridge Road in Pleasantville, New York. In 1930, then studying at the Art Students League, Cawein lived with her mother in a house by the train station near the center of the village of Pleasantville. After this move, she made etchings of Pleasantville scenes, including the one shown at right.

At about this time, Cawein became the protégé of a wealthy Pleasantville couple, Seabury C. Mastick and his wife Agnes Warner Mastick and in 1932 the Masticks hosted a reception for her and another Pleasantville artist to open an exhibition of their work that was held in the parish house of a local church. In 1946 Cawein moved again, this time to a studio and residence on Mountain Road in Pleasantville. In 1956 and again in 1960 she traveled to Europe with the Masticks, as their assistant and traveling companion. In 1964, a year after Agnes Mastick's death, she and Seabury Mastick married. (Note: In 1995 a reporter said that Cawein had formed a friendship with Agnes and that, having looked after her at the end of her life, Cawein did the same for her husband, marrying him in order "to take care of him.") Although Cawein had no direct connection with Pacific University in Forest Grove, Oregon, she became a benefactor of the school after receiving her inheritance from the Mastick estate. Her donations included a contribution to the endowment fund from the sale of the Mastick home in Pleasantville, the establishment of a scholarship fund, and both ownership of her etching plates and the receipts from sale of prints made from them. (Note: Cawein's decision to make major contributions to Pacific University stemmed from her friendship with Agnes Warner Mastick, whose brother, Franklin Warner, had been a university trustee in the 1940s and 1950s.) In 1984 the university honored Cawein by establishing the Kathrin Cawein Gallery of Art, funded by matching grant funds from the Oregon Arts Commission.

Other names: Cawein's given name was often misspelled in the press. Both Katherine and Kathryn were common.
