= List of cities and unincorporated communities in Oregon =

Oregon in United States.

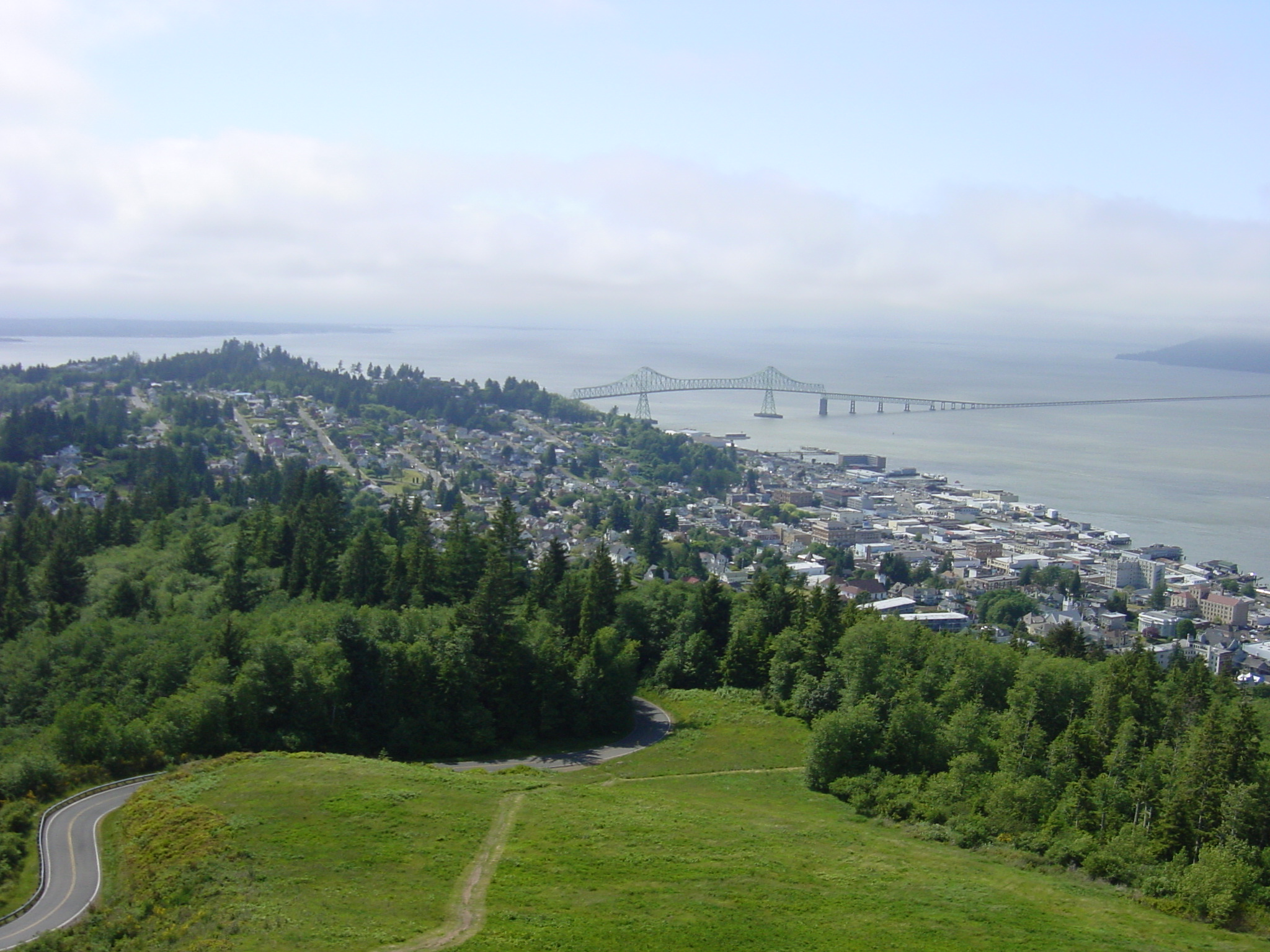
Astoria

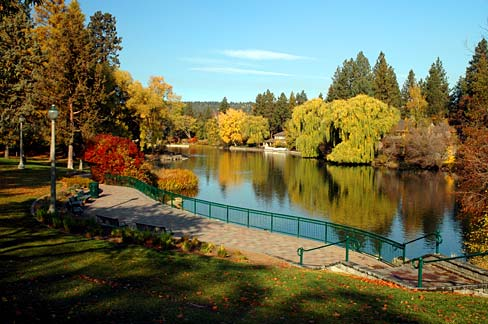
Bend

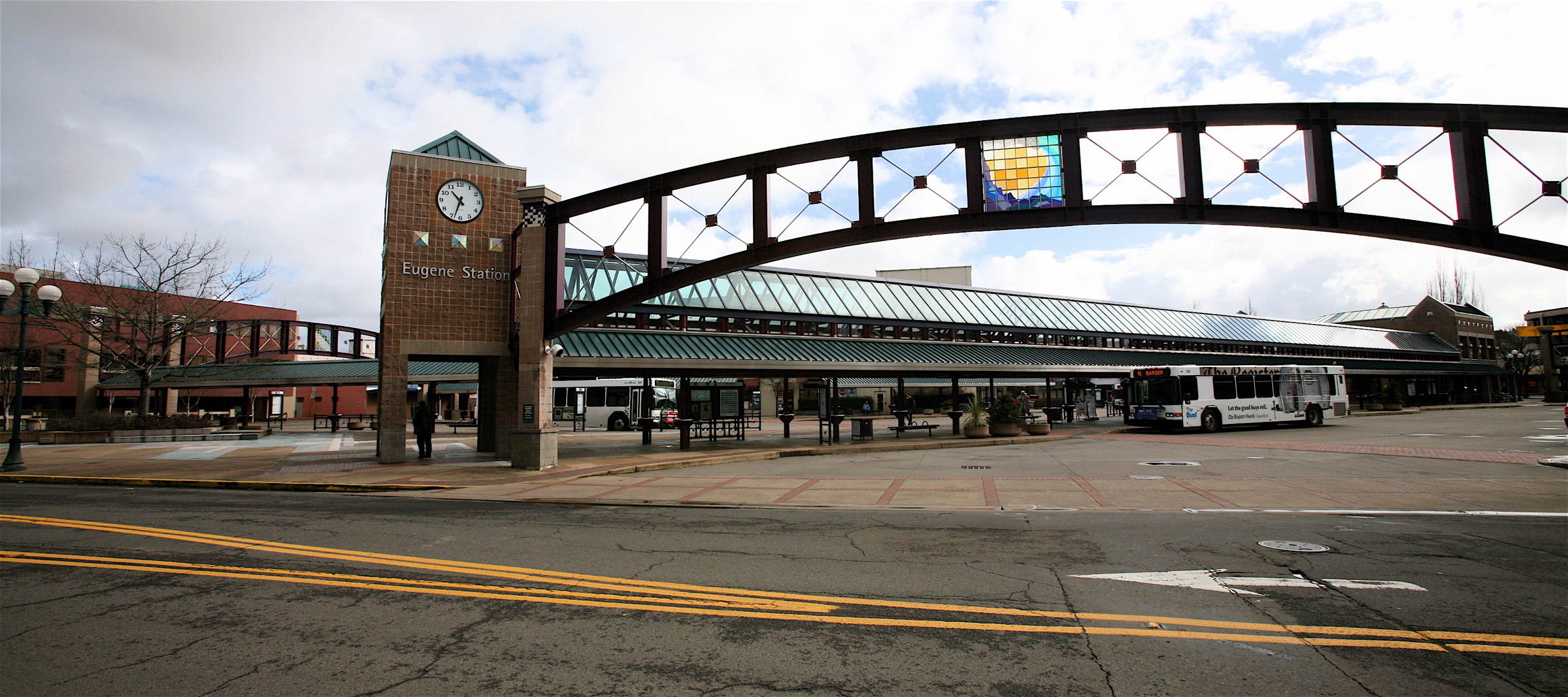
Eugene

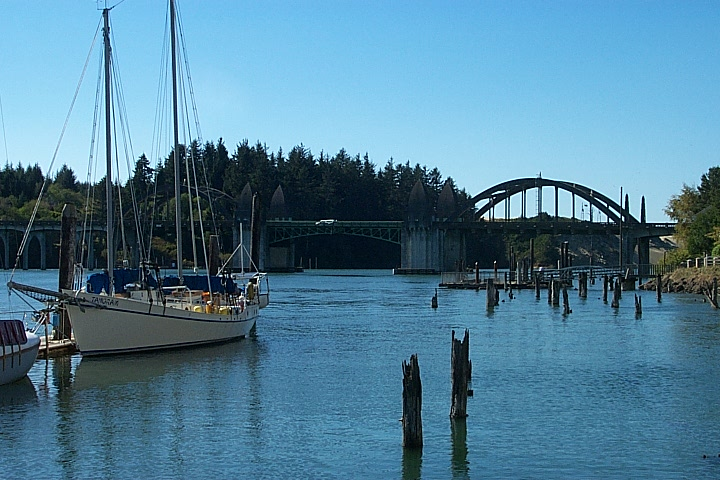
Florence

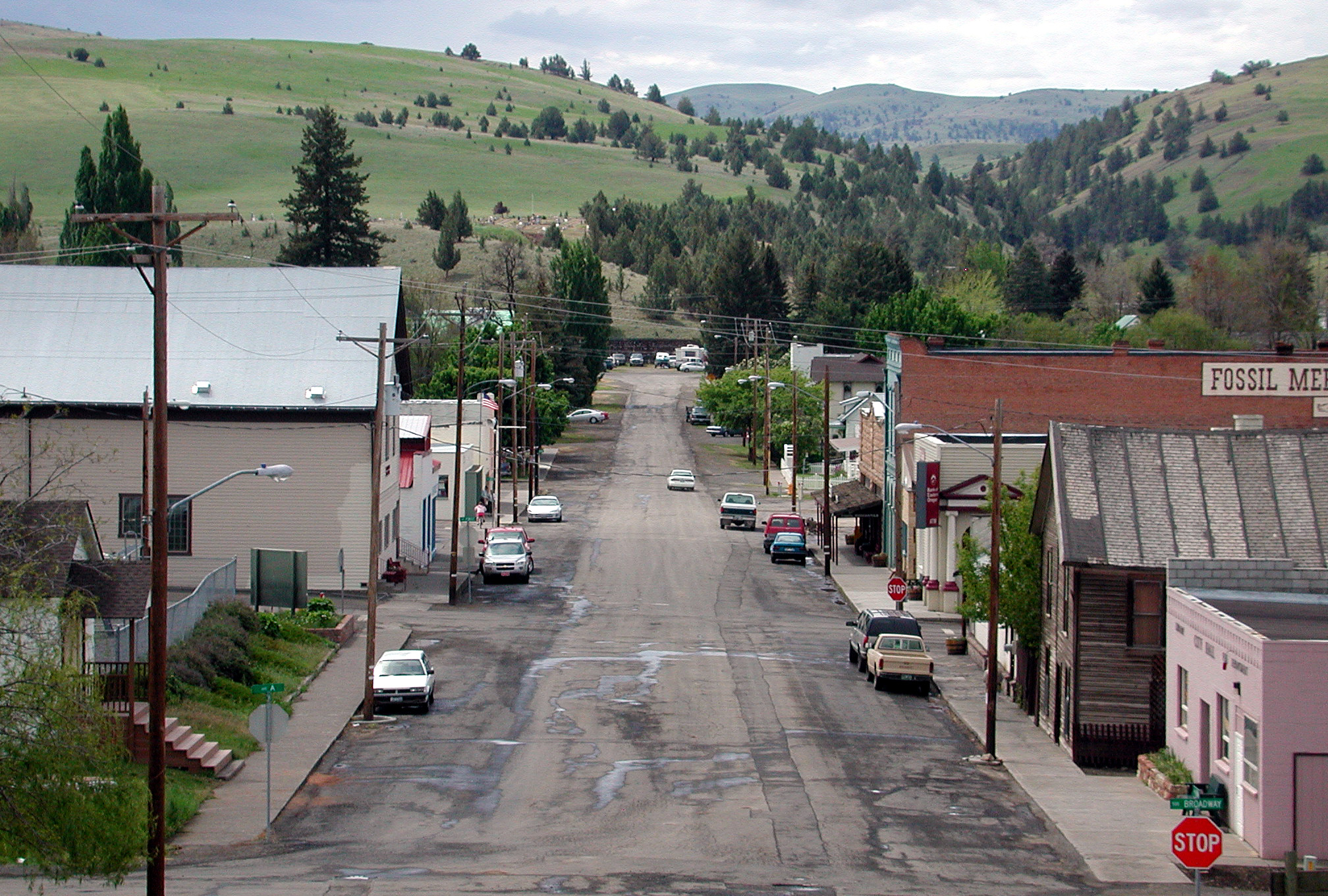
Fossil

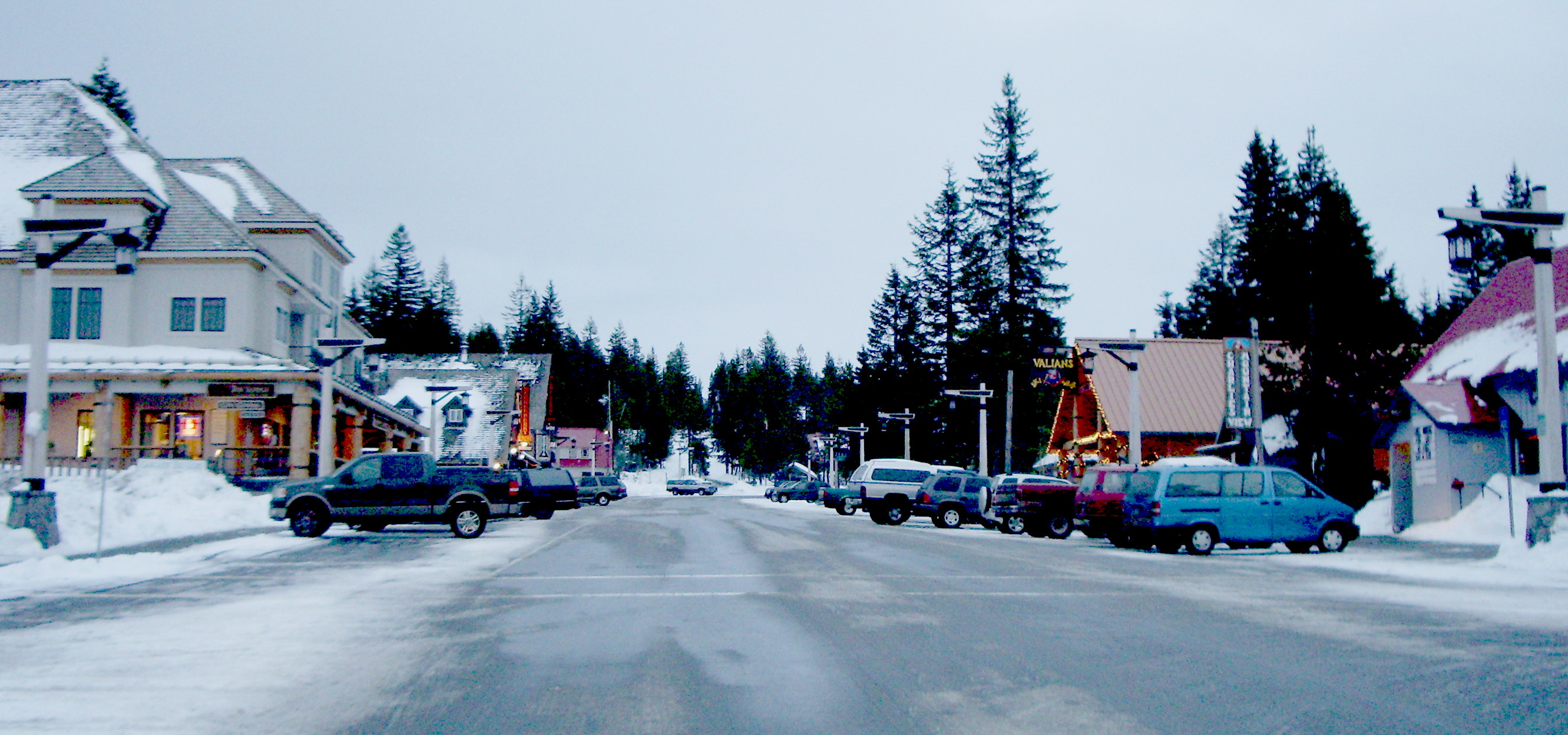
Government Camp

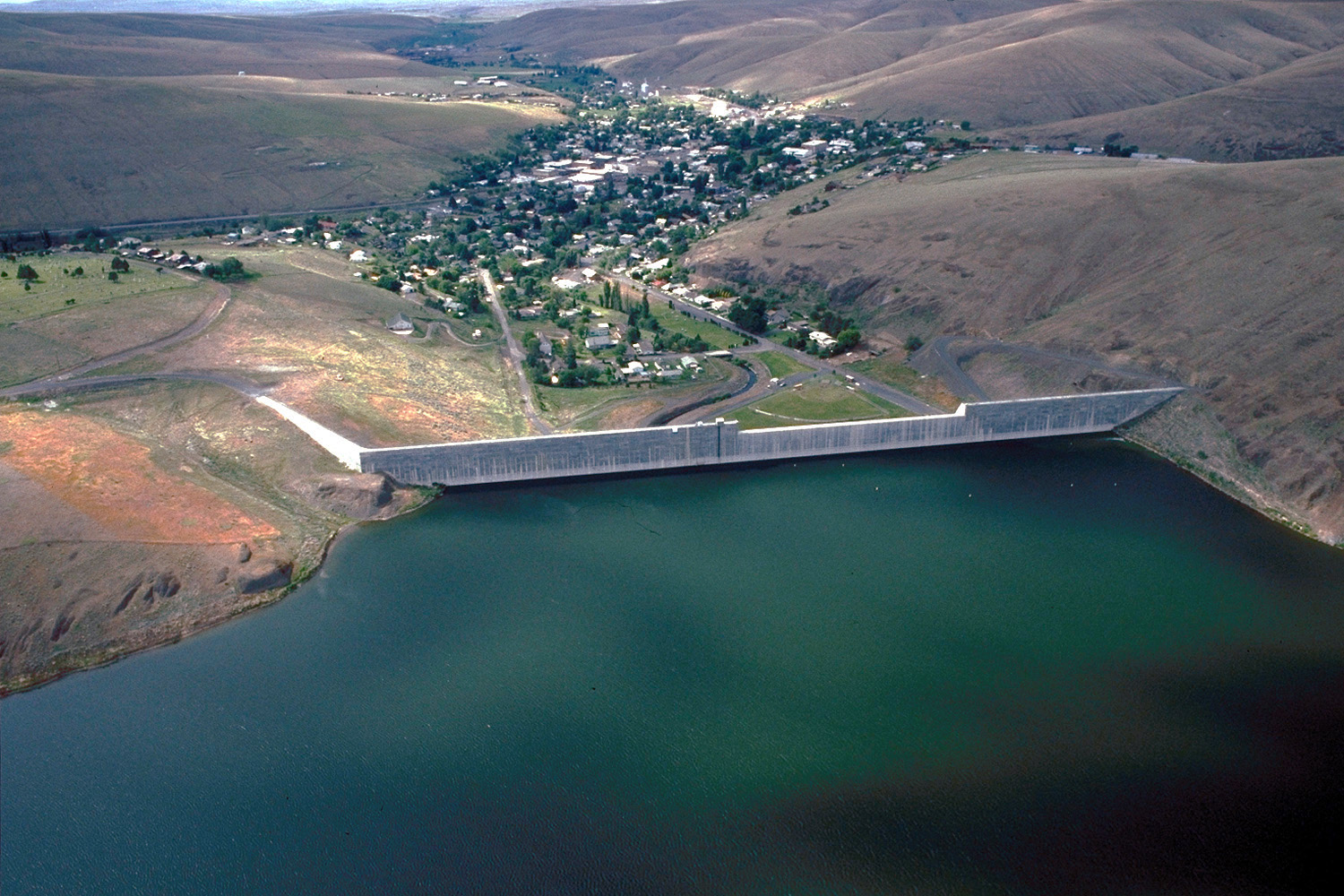
Heppner

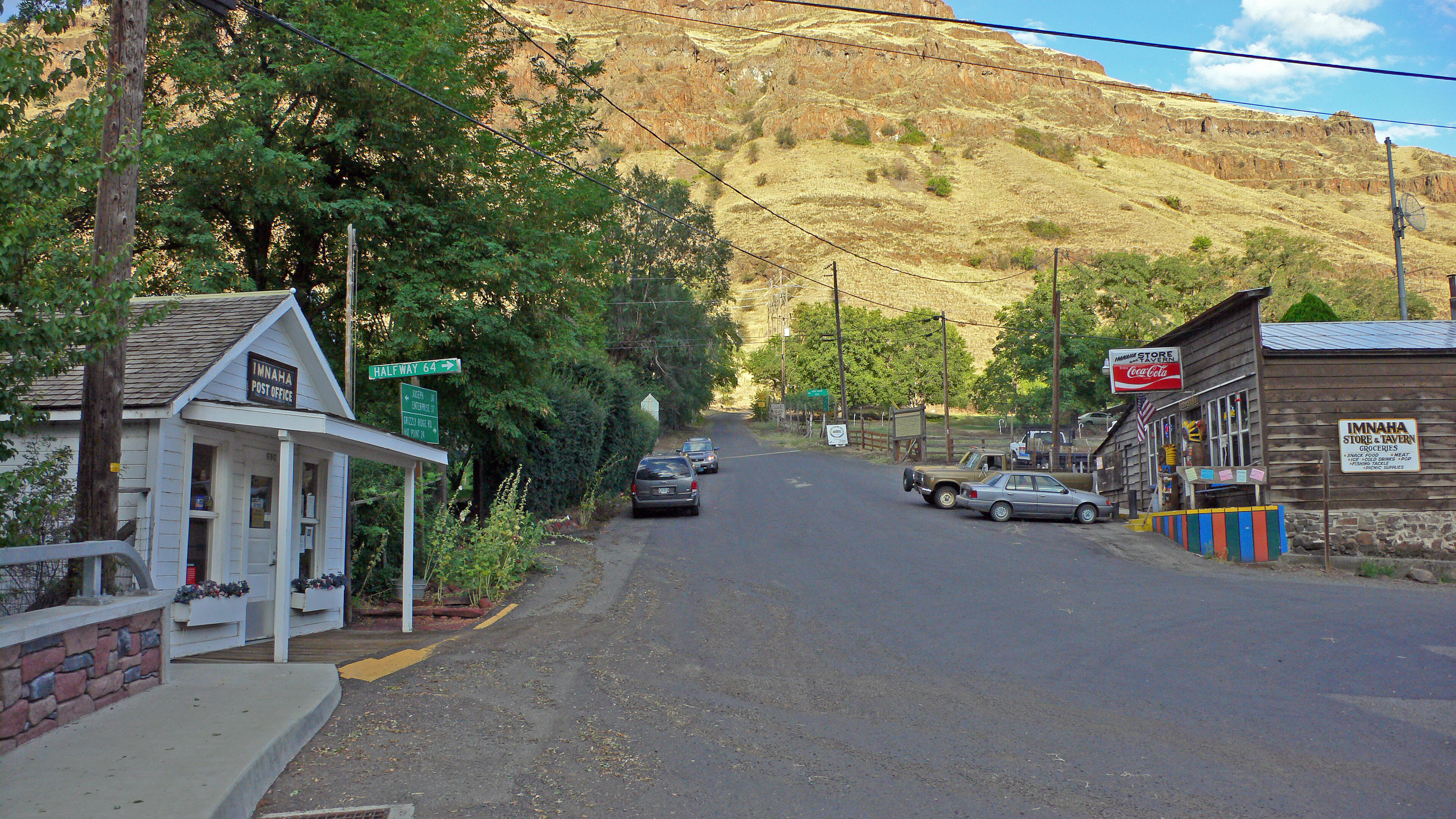
Imnaha

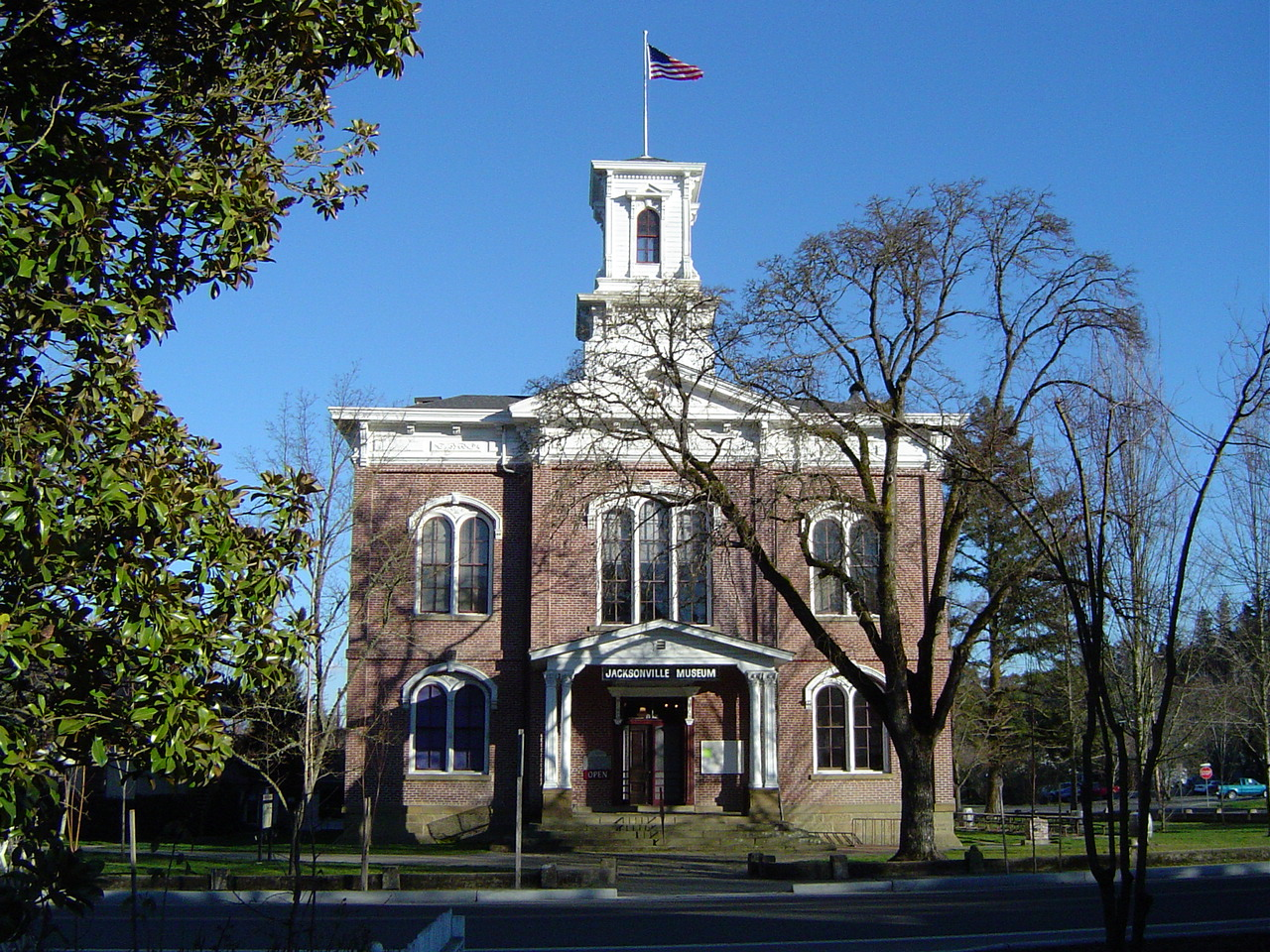
Jacksonville

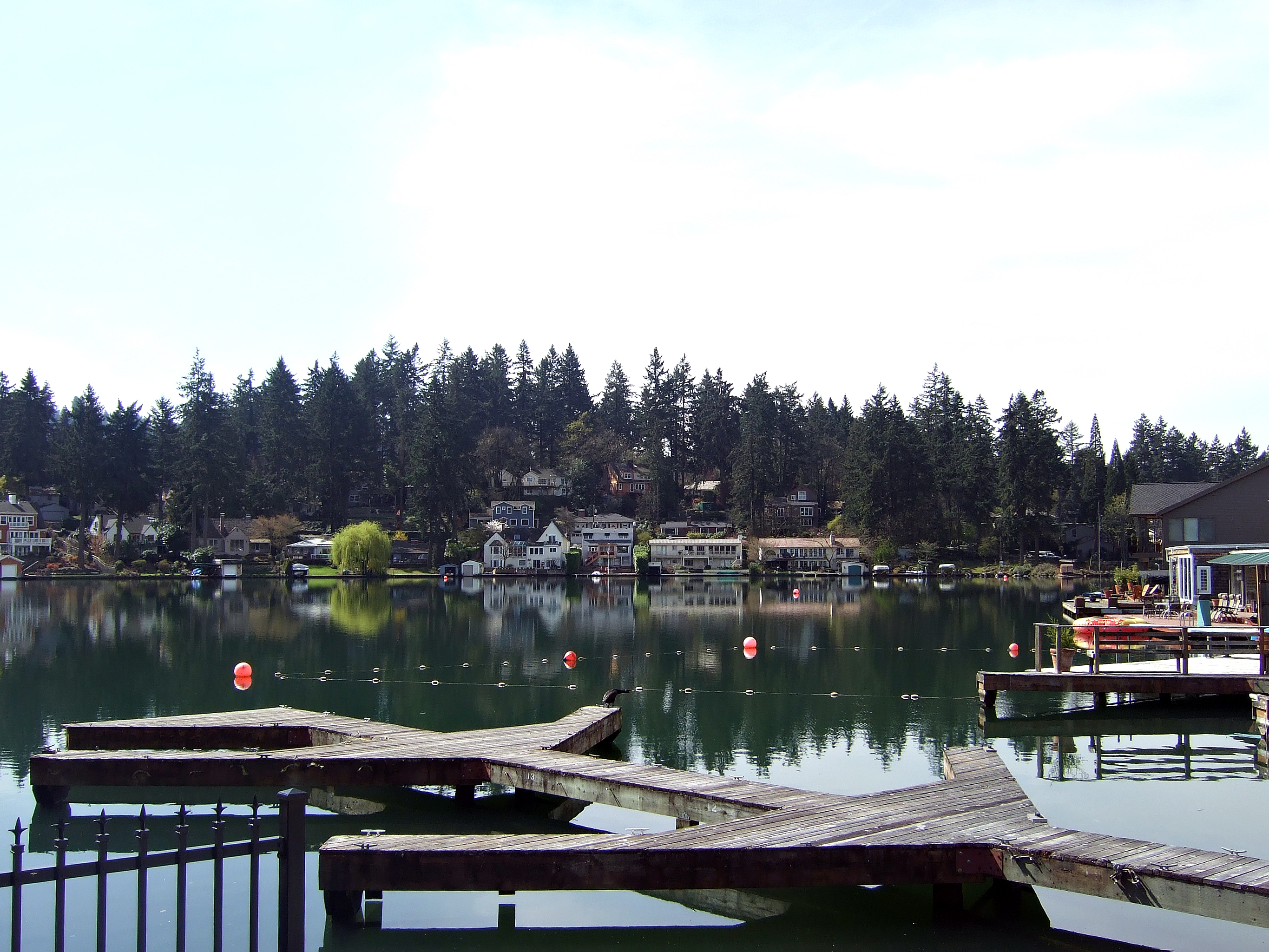
Lake Oswego

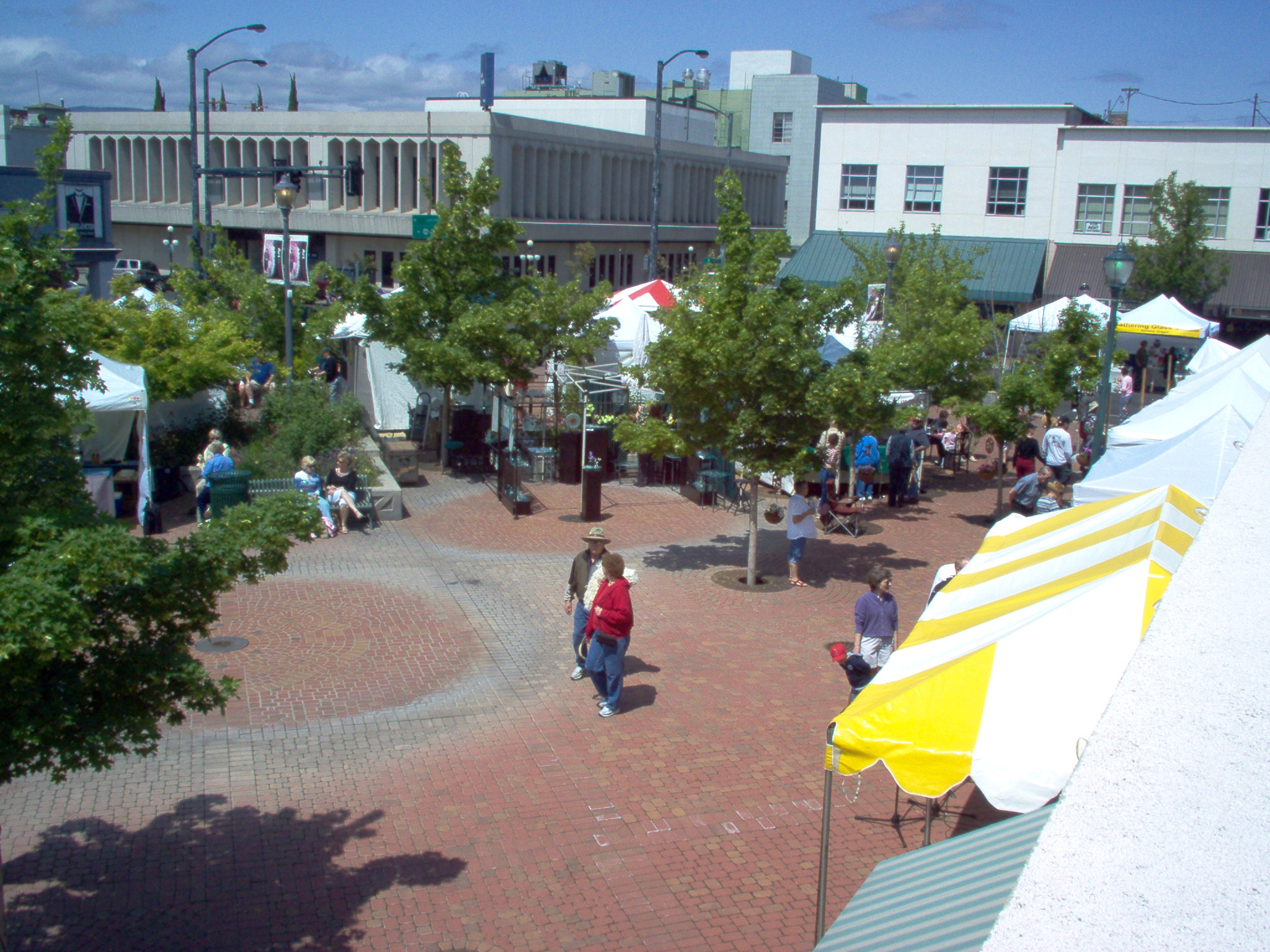
Medford

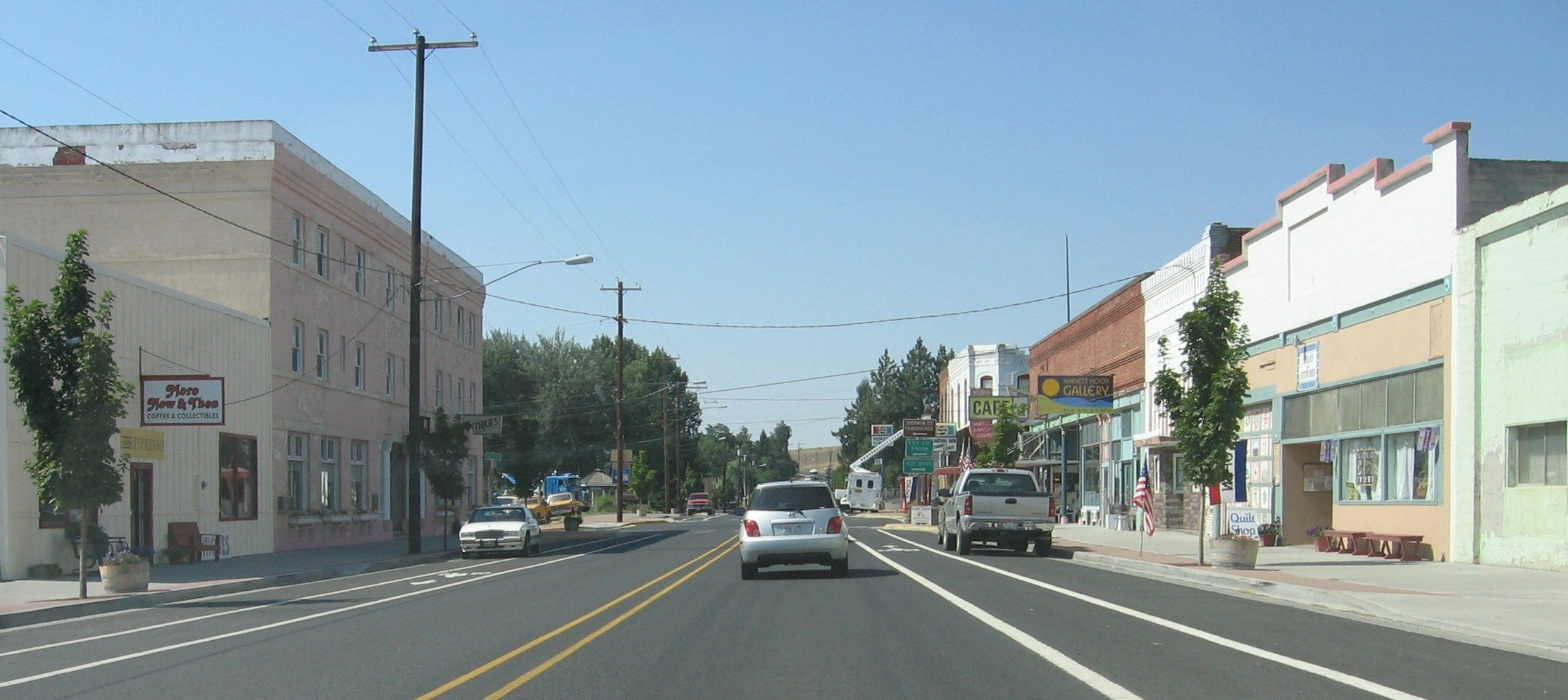
Moro

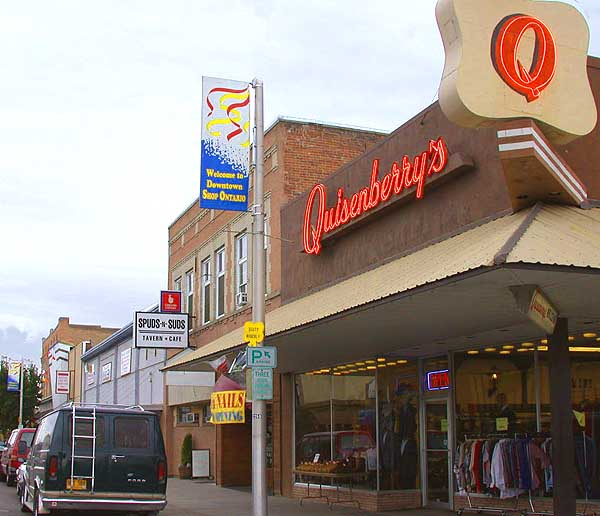
Ontario

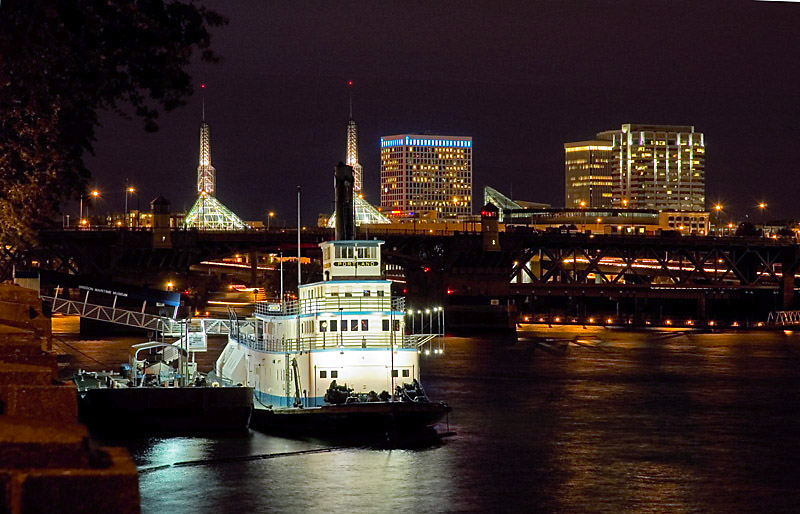
Portland

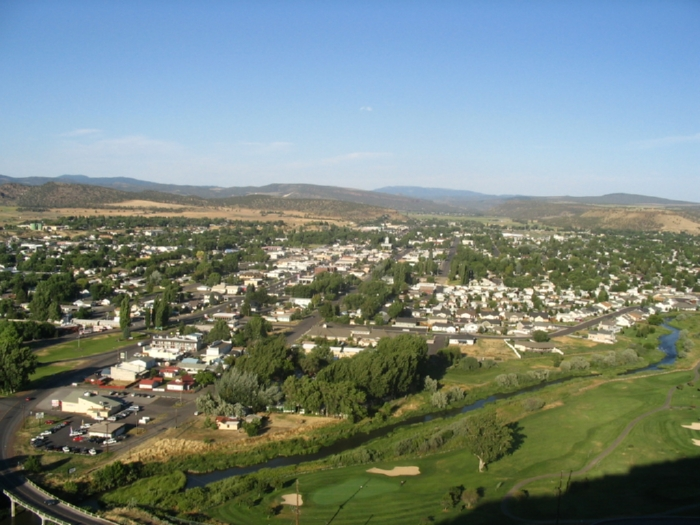
Prineville

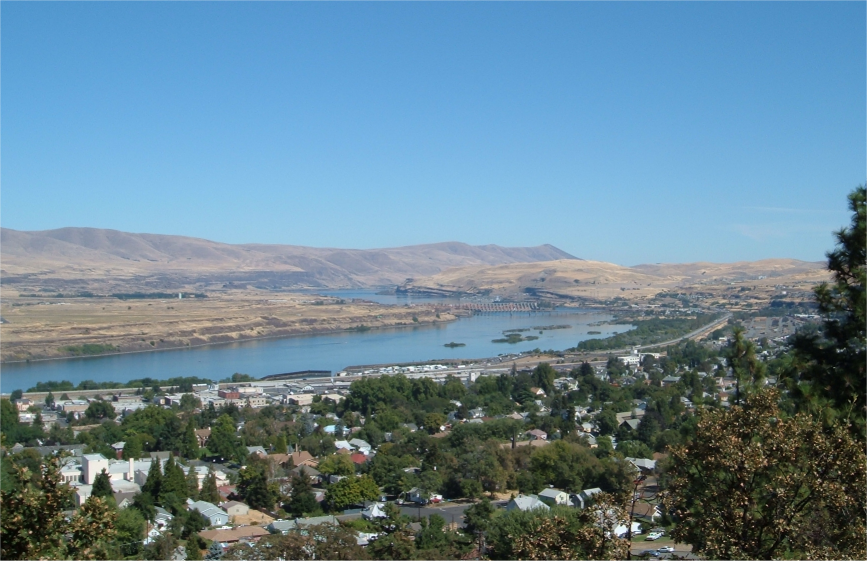
The Dalles

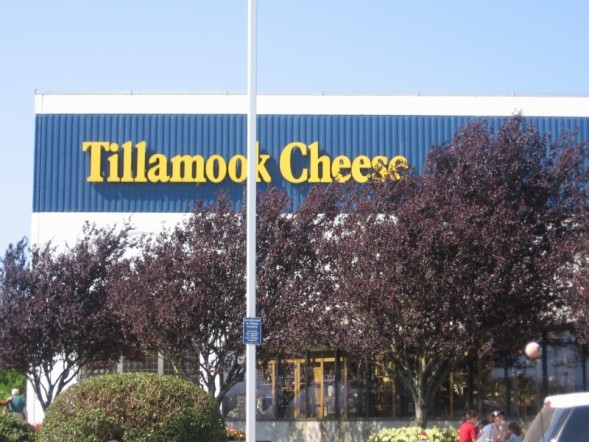
Tillamook

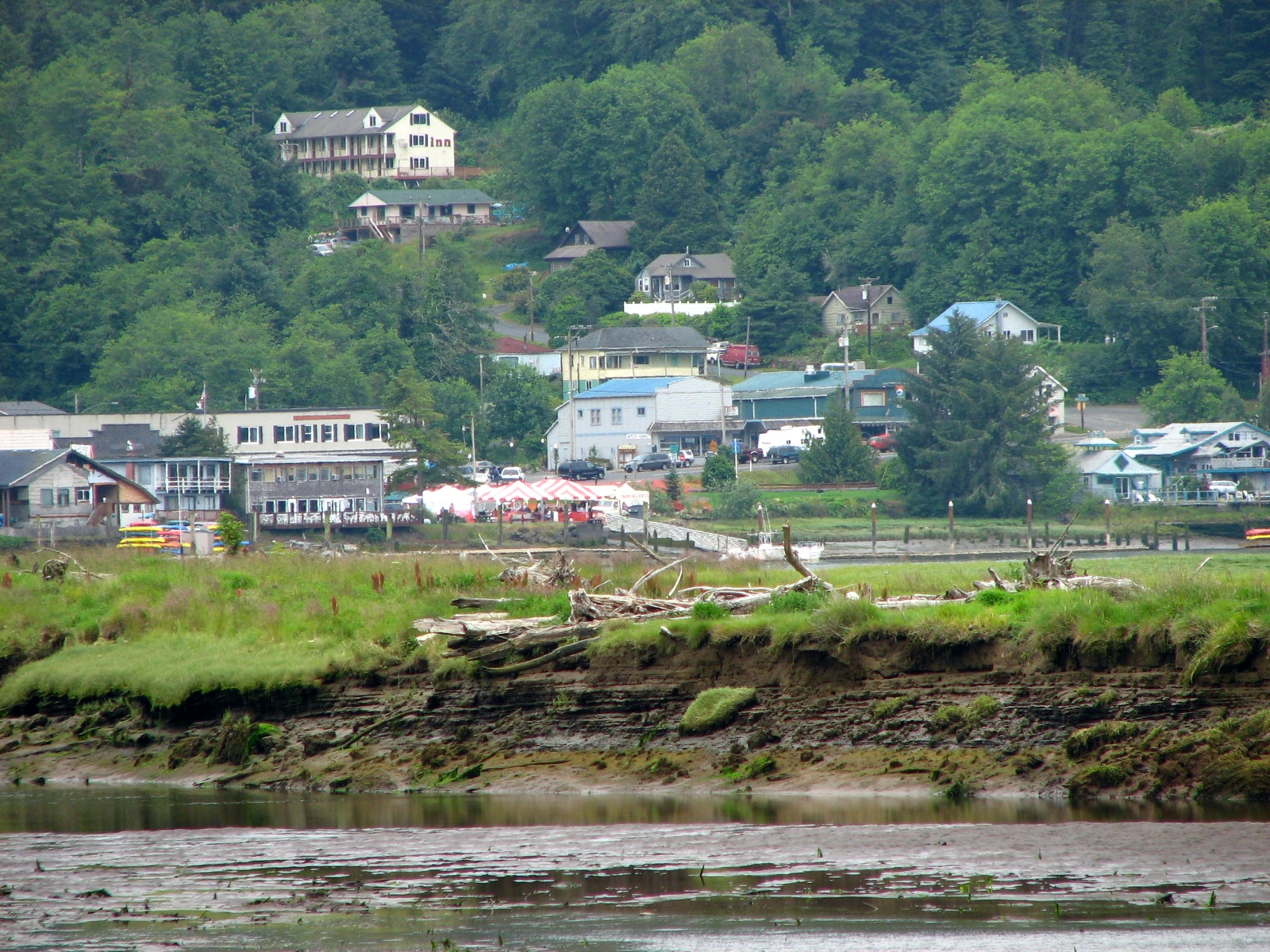
Wheeler

This list of cities and unincorporated communities in the U.S. state of Oregon includes all incorporated cities and many unincorporated communities, arranged in alphabetical order. Unincorporated communities are identified with italic type.

Cities are the only form of municipal government incorporated in Oregon. While villages and hamlets exist in Oregon, they are created by Clackamas County only, and do not resemble municipalities due to the limited nature of their powers and their lack of home-rule charters.

This list does not distinguish villages, hamlets, and other forms of local organization in Oregon; they are shown below as unincorporated communities and are shown in italics. In addition, some formerly freestanding communities have been partially or wholly subsumed by neighboring cities or abandoned and turned into ghost towns; these also are represented in italics but are marked an asterisk (*) to distinguish them from unincorporated communities.

== A ==
Ada – Adair Village – Adams – Adel – Adrian – Ady – Agate Beach – Agness – Airlie – Albany – Albina* – Alfalfa – Algoma – Alicel – Alma – Allegany – Aloha – Alpine – Alsea – Altamont – Alvadore – Amity – Andrews – Anlauf – Antelope – Antone – Apiary – Applegate – Arago – Arch Cape – Arlington – Arock – Ash – Ashland – Ashwood – Astoria – Athena – Auburn – Aumsville – Aurora – Austa – Austin – Austin Junction – Azalea

== B ==
Bacona – Baker City – Ballston – Bandon – Banks – Barlow – Barton – Barview (Coos County) – Barview (Tillamook County) – Bates – Bay City – Bayocean* – Beatty – Beaver – Beaver Hill – Beaver Marsh – Beavercreek – Beaverton – Beech Creek – Belknap Springs – Bellevue – Bellfountain – Bend – Bethany – Bethel – Beulah – Beverly Beach – Biggs Junction – Bingham Springs – Birkenfeld – Blachly – Black Butte Ranch – Black Rock – Blakeley – Blalock* – Blodgett – Blooming – Blue River – Bly – Boardman – Bonanza – Bonneville – Bonita – Bonny Slope – Boring – Bourne – Boyd – Breitenbush – Bridal Veil – Bridge – Bridgeport (Baker County) – Bridgeport (Polk County) – Brighton – Brightwood – Broadbent – Brockway – Brogan – Brookings – Brooks – Brothers – Brownlee – Brownsmead – Brownsville – Buchanan – Buena Vista – Bull Mountain – Bull Run – Buncom – Bunker Hill – Burlington (Linn County)* – Burlington (Multnomah County) – Burns – Burns Junction – Burnt Woods – Butte Falls – Butteville – Buxton

== C ==
Cabell City* – Cairo – Camas Valley – Camp Sherman – Canary – Canby – Canemah* – Cannon Beach – Canyon City – Canyonville – Cape Meares – Carlton – Carnation – Carpenterville – Carson – Carus – Carver* – Cascade Locks – Cascade Summit – Cascadia – Castle Rock (Morrow County)* – Cave Junction – Cayuse – Cazadero – Cecil – Cedar Hills – Cedar Mill – Celilo Village – Central Point – Champoeg – Charbonneau – Charleston – Chehalem – Chemawa – Chemult – Cherry Grove – Cherryville – Cheshire – Chiloquin – Chitwood – Christmas Valley – Clackamas – Clarno – Clatskanie – Clear Lake – Clem – Clifton (Clatsop County) – Clifton (Hood River County) – Cloverdale (Deschutes County) – Cloverdale (Lane County) – Cloverdale (Tillamook County) – Coburg – Cold Springs – Colton – Columbia City – Condon – Coos Bay – Cooston – Copper (Jackson County)* – Copper (Wallowa County)* – Copperfield* – Coquille – Corbett – Cornelius – Cornucopia – Corvallis – Cottage Grove – Cottrell – Courtrock – Cove – Crabtree – Crane – Crawfordsville – Crescent – Crescent Lake – Crescent Lake Junction – Creswell – Crooked River Ranch – Crow – Crowley (Malheur County) – Crowley (Polk County) – Culp Creek – Culver – Curtin – Cushman – Cutler City*

== D ==
Dairy – Dale – Dallas – Damascus – Danner – Dawson – Days Creek – Dayton – Dayville – Deadwood – Dee – Deer Island – Deerhorn – Delake* – Dellwood – Denio – Denmark – Depoe Bay – Detroit – Dexter – Diamond – Diamond Lake – Dillard – Dilley – Disston – Divide* – Dixie (Baker County) – Dixie (Grant County)* – Dixie (Washington County)* – Dodson – Dolph – Donald – Donnybrook – Dora – Dorena – Drain – Drew – Drewsey – Dryden – Dufur – Dundee – Dunes City – Dunthorpe – Durham – Durkee

== E ==
Eagle Creek – Eagle Point – East Portland* – Eastside* – Echo – Eddyville – Eightmile – Elgin – Elk City – Elkhead – Elkton – Ella – Ellendale* – Elmira – Elmonica – Elsie – Empire* – Enterprise – Eola – Estacada – Eugene

== F ==
Fairbanks – Fairview – Falcon Heights – Fall Creek – Falls City – Farmington – Ferndale – Fields – Finn Rock – Fisher – Five Corners – Flagg – Flavel* – Flora – Florence – Forest Grove – Fort Klamath – Fort Rock – Fort Stevens* – Foss – Fossil – Foster – Four Corners (Jackson County) – Four Corners (Marion County) – Fox – Franklin – Frankport* – Frenchglen – Friend

== G ==
Galena* – Gales Creek – Galice – Garden Home–Whitford – Gardiner – Garibaldi – Gaston – Gates – Gateway – Gaylord – Gearhart – Gervais – Gibbon – Gilchrist – Gladstone – Glenada – Glenbrook – Glencoe* – Glendale – Gleneden Beach – Glenwood (Lane County) – Glenwood (Washington County) – Glide – Goble – Gold Beach – Gold Hill – Golden* – Goldson – Gopher* – Gopher Flats – Goshen – Government Camp – Grand Ronde – Granite – Grants Pass – Grass Valley – Gravelford – Green – Green Acres – Greenberry – Greenhorn – Greenleaf – Greenville – Gresham

== H ==
Hadleyville – Hager – Haines – Halfway – Halsey – Hamilton – Hamlet – Hammond* – Hampton (Deschutes County) – - Happy Valley – Harbor – Hardman – Harlan – Harper – Harrisburg – Hatfield – Hauser – - Hayward – Hazeldale – Hebo – Heceta Beach – Helix – Helvetia – Henley – Heppner – Hereford – Hermiston – Hildebrand – Hilgard – Hillsboro – Hines – Hinkle – Holbrook – Holdman – Holland – Holley – Homestead – Hood River – Hopewell – Horse Heaven – Horton – Hot Lake – Hubbard – Huber – Hugo – Huntington

== I ==
Idanha – Idaville – Idiotville* – Idleyld Park – Illahe – Imbler – Imnaha – Independence – Indian Village – Indiola – Inglis – Inlow – Interlachen – Ione – Ironside – Irrigon – Irving – Island City – Izee

== J ==
Jacksonville – Jamieson – Jasper – Jean – Jeffers Garden – Jefferson – Jennings Lodge – Jewell – Jewell Junction – Jimtown – John Day – Johnson City – Jonesboro – Jordan – Jordan Creek – Jordan Valley – Joseph – Junction City – Juntura

== K ==
Kamela – Kansas City – Keasey – Keating – Keizer – Kellogg – Kelso – Keno – Kent – Kerby – Kernville – Kerry – Kimberly – King City – Kings Valley – Kingsley – Kingston – Kinton – Kinzua* – Kirk – Kirkpatrick – Klamath Agency – Klamath Falls – Klondike – Knappa

== L ==
La Grande – La Pine – Lacomb – Ladd Hill – Lafayette – Lake of the Woods – Lake Oswego – Lake Creek – Lakeside – Lakeview – Lakewood – Lancaster – Langell Valley – Langlois – Latham – Laurel – Laurel Grove – Laurelwood – Lawen – Leaburg – Lebanon – Lees Camp – Lehman Springs – Leland – Lemati* – Lena – Leneve – Lenz (Hood River County) – Lenz (Klamath County) – Leona – Lewis – Lewisburg – Lewisville – Lexington (Clatsop County)* – Lexington (Morrow County) – Libby – Liberal – Lime – Lincoln Beach – Lincoln City – Lindbergh – Linn City* – Linnton* – Linslaw – Little Albany – Little Alps – Locust Grove – Logan – Logsden – London Springs – Lone Elder – Lonerock – Long Creek – Lookingglass – Lorane – Lorella – Lostine – Low Pass – Lowell – Lukarilla – Lunnville – Luper* – Lyons

== M ==
Mabel – Macksburg – Macleay – Madras – Malabon* – Malin – Malone – Manhattan Beach – Manning – Manzanita – Mapleton – Marcola – Marial – Marion – Marion Forks – Marlene Village – Marmot – Marquam – Marshland – Marylhurst – Maupin – Maxville – Mayger – Mayville – Maywood Park – McCoy – McCredie Springs – McDermitt – McDonald – McEwen – McKay – McKee – McKee Bridge – McKenzie Bridge – McKinley – McLeod – McMinnville – McNary – McNulty – Meacham – Meda – Medford – Medical Springs – Mehama – Melrose – Melville – Merlin – Merrill – Metolius – Metzger – Middle Grove – Middleton – Midland – Midway – Mikkalo – Miles Crossing – Mill City – Millersburg – Millican – Millington – Millwood – Milo – Milton-Freewater – Milwaukie – Milwaukie Heights – Minam – Minerva – Mission – Mist – Mitchell – Modeville – Modoc Point – Mohawk – Mohler – Molalla – Molalla Prairie – Monitor – Monmouth – Monroe – Monument – Morgan – Moro – Mosier – Mount Angel – Mount Hood – Mount Hood Village – Mount Vernon – Mountain Air Park – Mountain View – Mountaindale – Mulino – Mulloy – Murphy – Myrick – Myrtle Creek – Myrtle Point

== N ==
Narrows – Nashville – Navy Heights – Neahkahnie Beach – Necanicum – Nedonna Beach – Needy – Nehalem – Nelscott* – Neotsu – Nesika Beach – Neskowin – Netarts – New Bridge – New Era – New Hope – New Pine Creek – New Princeton – Newberg – Newport – Newport Heights – Niagara – Nibley – Nimrod – Nolin – Nonpareil – North Albany – North Beach – North Bend – North Howell – North Plains – North Powder – Nortons – Norway – Norwood – Noti – Nye – Nyssa

== O ==
Oak Grove – Oak Hills – Oakland – Oakridge – Oatfield – O'Brien – Oceanlake* – Oceanside – Odell – Odessa – Olene – Olex – Olney – Ontario – Ophir – Oregon City – Orenco* – Oretown – Orleans* – Orodell – Ortley – Otis – Otis Junction – Otter Rock – Owyhee – Oxbow

== P ==
Pacific City – Paisley – Paradise – Parkdale – Paulina – Payette Junction – Pedee – Pelican City – Pendleton – Peoria – Perry – Perrydale – Philomath – Phoenix – Pilot Rock – Pine – Pine Grove (Hood River County) – Pine Grove (Klamath County) – Pine Grove (Wasco County) – Pine Ridge* – Pinehurst – Pistol River – Pittsburg – Placer – Pleasant Hill – Pleasant Valley (Baker County) – Pleasant Valley (Josephine County) – Pleasant Valley (Tillamook County) – Plush – Pocahontas – Pondosa – Port Orford – Portland – Post – Powell Butte – Powers – Prairie City – Pratum – Prescott – Prineville – Progress* – Prospect – Prosper – Provolt

== Q ==
Quartz Mountain – Quincy

== R ==
Rainbow – Rainier – Rajneeshpuram* – Raleigh Hills – Range – Redland – Redmond – Reedsport – Reedville – Remote – Rhododendron – Rice – Rice Hill – Richland – Richmond – Rickreall – Riddle – Rieth – Riley – Ripplebrook – Ritter – Rivergrove – Riverside (Clackamas County) – Riverside (Linn County) – Riverside (Malheur County) – Riverside (Umatilla County) – Riverside (Yamhill County) – Riverton – Riverview (Lane County) – Riverview (Multnomah County) – Riverview (Umatilla County) – Riverwood – Roads End* – Robinsonville* – Rock Creek (Baker County) – Rock Creek (Gilliam County) – Rockcreek – Rock Point – Rockaway Beach – Rocky Point – Rogue River – Rome – Rose Lodge – Roseburg – Rosedale – Round Prairie – Rowena – Rowland* – Roy – Ruch – Rufus – Ruggs

== S ==
Saginaw – Saint Benedict – Saint Helens – Saint Johns* – Saint Joseph – Saint Louis – Saint Paul – Salem – Salisbury – Salt Creek – Sams Valley – Sandy – Santiam Junction – Scappoose – Scholls – Scio – Scotts Mills – Scottsburg – Seal Rock – Seaside – Sellwood* – Selma – Seneca – Service Creek – Shadowood – Shady – Shady Cove – Shaniko – Shaw – Shedd – Sheridan – Sherwood – Shevlin* – Shipley* – Siletz – Siltcoos – Silver Lake – Silverton – Sisters – Sitkum – Sixes – Skipanon* – Sodaville – South Beach – South Lebanon – Southport* – Sparta – Sprague River – Spray – Springbrook* – Springdale – Springfield – Springwater – Stafford – Stanfield – Starkey – Starvation Heights – Stayton – Steamboat (Douglas County) – Steamboat (Jackson County) – Sterlingville – Sublimity – Sulphur Springs – Summer Lake – Summerville – Summit – Sumner – Sumpter – Sunny Valley – Sunnyside (Clackamas County) – Sunnyside (Umatilla County) – Sunriver – Sunset Beach – Suplee – Surf Pines – Susanville* – Sutherlin – Suver – Svensen – Sweet Home – Swisshome

== T ==
Table Rock – Taft* – Takilma – Talbot – Talent – Tallman* – Tangent – Telocaset – Tenmile (Coos County) – Tenmile (Douglas County) – Terrebonne – Thatcher – The Dalles – Thomas* – Three Rivers – Thurston* – Tide – Tidewater – Tiernan – Tierra Del Mar – Tigard – Tillamook – Tiller – Timber – Toledo – Tollgate – Tolo – Tolovana Park – Tonquin – Trail – Tri-City – Triangle Lake – Troutdale – Troy – Tualatin – Tumalo – Turner – Twickenham – Twin Rocks – Tygh Valley

== U ==
Ukiah – Umapine – Umatilla – Umpqua – Union – Union Creek – Unity

== V ==
Vale – Valley Falls – Valley Junction – Valsetz – Van – Vanport* – Vaughn – Venator – Veneta – Verboort – Vernonia – Vida – Voltage

== W ==
Waconda – Wagontire – Walden – Waldo – Waldport – Walker – Wallowa – Walterville – Walton – Wamic – Wapinitia – Warm Springs – Warren – Warrendale – Warrenton – Waterman – Wasco – Wauna – Waterloo – Weatherby – Wecoma Beach* – Wedderburn – Welches – Wemme – Wendling – West Haven-Sylvan – West Linn – West Salem* – West Scio – West Side – West Slope – West Stayton – West Union – Westfall – Westfir – Weston – Westport – Wheatland – Wheeler – White City – Whiteson – Whitney – Wilbur – Wilderville – Wilkesboro – Willamina – Willamette* – Williams – Willowcreek – Wilsonville – Wimer – Winchester – Winchester Bay – Wingville – Winston – Witch Hazel* – Wolf Creek – Wonder – Wood Village – Woodburn – Woods – Woodson – Worden – Wren – Wyeth

== Y ==
Yachats – Yamhill – Yaquina – Yarnell* – Yoder – Yoncalla – Yonna

== Z ==
Zena – Zigzag – Zumwalt*

== See also ==
- List of cities in Oregon
- List of counties in Oregon
- List of census-designated places in Oregon by population
- List of ghost towns in Oregon
- Oregon statistical areas
- Lists of populated places in the United States
- Lists of Oregon-related topics

== Notes and references ==
- Unless otherwise noted, all incorporated cities are included by reference to: "Oregon Blue Book (online edition)". Oregon Blue Book. Oregon State Archives.
