= Riverview, Oregon =

Riverview may refer to one of these locales in the U.S. state of Oregon:

- Riverview, Lane County, Oregon
- Riverview, Multnomah County, Oregon
- Riverview, Umatilla County, Oregon
- Riverview, an alternate name for Adrian, Oregon
