= Yarnell =

Yarnell may refer to:

== Places in the United States ==
- Yarnell, Arizona
- Yarnell, Oregon
- Yarnell, Pennsylvania
- Yarnell, Wisconsin

== People with the name Yarnell ==
- Carolyn Yarnell (born 1961), American composer and visual artist
- Jesse Yarnell (1837–1906), American journalist
- Harry E. Yarnell (1875–1959), American naval officer
- Lorene Yarnell (1944–2010), actress and mime artist
- Nate Yarnell (born 2002), American football player

== Other ==
- Yarnell Ice Cream Co.

== See also ==
- Yarnall, a surname
