= Millwood =

Millwood may refer to:

== Places ==
=== Australia ===
- Millwood, New South Wales
- Millwood, Queensland, a locality in the Toowoomba Region

=== Canada ===
- Millwood High School (Nova Scotia), Lower Sackville, Nova Scotia
- Millwood Junior School, Etobicoke, Ontario
- Mill Woods, Edmonton

=== South Africa ===
- Millwood, South Africa

=== United Kingdom ===
- Millwood, County Fermanagh, a townland in County Fermanagh, Northern Ireland

=== United States ===
- Millwood (Greensboro, Alabama), a historic property near Greensboro, Alabama
- Millwood Lake, in Arkansas
- Millwood, Georgia
- Millwood, Kansas
- Millwood, Kentucky
- Millwood, Massachusetts
- Millwood Township, Stearns County, Minnesota
- Millwood, New York
- Millwood, Ohio, an unincorporated community in Knox County
- Millwood Township, Guernsey County, Ohio
- Millwood Public Schools (Oklahoma), a school district in Oklahoma City
- Millwood, Oregon
- Millwood, Pennsylvania
- Millwood, South Carolina
- Millwood (Richland County, South Carolina) NRHP ruins of plantation house
- Millwood, Texas
- Millwood, Virginia
- Millwood, Washington
- Millwood, West Virginia

== People ==
- Millwood (surname)
