= Burlington, Oregon =

Burlington, Oregon may refer to:

- Burlington, Linn County, Oregon, a former community
- Burlington, Multnomah County, Oregon, a populated place
