= Carnation (disambiguation) =

Carnation refers to Dianthus caryophyllus, a flowering plant.

Carnation may also refer to:

== Other ==
- Carnation, Oregon, a U.S. unincorporated community
- Carnation, Washington, a U.S. city
- Carnation Revolution, a 1974 revolution in Portugal
- Carnation (TV series), a Japanese TV series
- 2S1 Gvozdika (Carnation), a Soviet 122-mm self-propelled howitzer

== Brands ==
- Carnation (brand), a food and drink brand
- Car-Nation (also known as "Carnation"), a 1910s automobile brand

== Colours ==
- Carnation (colour), the colour of the flower of a carnation plant
- Carnation (heraldry), the colour of flesh (pale pink)
- Carnation (painting), the colour of flesh

== Music ==
- The Carnations, a Canadian indie rock band
- Carnation (album), a 2002 album by Astrid Williamson
- "Carnation" (song), a 2011 song by Ringo Sheena
- "Carnation", a song by The Jam originally released on The Gift
