= Alvin Clark =

Alvin Clark may refer to:

- Alvin Clark (schooner), a nineteenth-century schooner salvaged in 1969
- Alvin Clark (horseman), trainer of Grey Invader who ran in the Hong Kong Cup
- Alvin Clark, keyboardist on and producer for The Monochrome Set's album Love Zombies
- Alvin Clark, producer of X's album Live at the Whisky a Go-Go
- Alvin Clark, engineer on Buck-O-Nine's album Twenty-Eight Teeth
- Alvin Clark, father of American diplomat Alvin M. Owsley
- Alvin Clark, laid out Grandview, Iowa in 1841

== People with the given names ==
- Alvin Clark Owsley, member of the Twenty-first Texas Legislature

== See also ==
- Alvan Clark, 19th-century astronomer and telescope-maker
  - Alvan Clark & Sons
- Alvan Graham Clark, his son, American astronomer and telescope maker
- Disappearance of Marvin Clark
