= Riverside, Oregon =

Riverside, Oregon may refer to one of these places in the U.S. state of Oregon:

- Riverside, Clackamas County, Oregon, an unincorporated historic community
- Riverside, Linn County, Oregon, an unincorporated community
- Riverside, Malheur County, Oregon, an unincorporated community
- Riverside, Umatilla County, Oregon, a census-designated place
- Riverside, Yamhill County, Oregon, an unincorporated historic community
- Riverside, former name of Riverwood, Oregon, an unincorporated community in Multnomah County
