= Disappearance of Marvin Clark =

Oldest active missing person case in the US

Marvin Clark
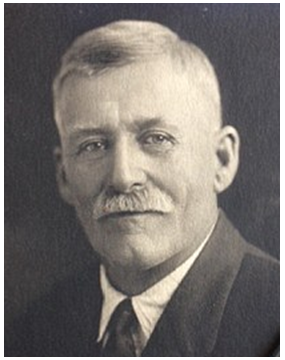
- Portrait of Clark
- Born: Marvin Alvin Clark c. 1852; Marion County, Iowa, U.S.
- Disappeared: October 30, 1926 (aged 73–74); Portland, Oregon, U.S.
- Status: Missing for 100 years and 21 days
- Height: 5 ft 8 in (1.73 m)

On October 30, 1926, Marvin Alvin Clark, an American man, disappeared under mysterious circumstances while traveling to visit his daughter in Portland, Oregon during the Halloween weekend. Clark's case is considered the oldest active missing person case in the United States.

Clark left his home in Tigard, Oregon, that afternoon to meet his daughter in downtown Portland. He never arrived, and no family members had contact with him that day. Several witnesses later claimed to have seen him at a bus terminal, dressed in a dark suit and slacks. More than a week later, on November 9, Clark's wife, Mary, received a postcard from Bellingham, Washington, apparently sent by her husband. Witnesses in Bellingham reported seeing him there on November 2 and 3.

In 1986, loggers discovered a skeletal human remains in a wooded area between Portland and Tigard. The remains were estimated to be been between 35 and 55 years old, and several personal items dating to the late 19th and early 20th centuries were found nearby. These artifacts led detectives to suspect the remains might be Clark's, and the possible connection drew national attention in 2011. However, DNA in 2018 confirmed that the remains were not his. Clark's whereabouts remain unknown.

== Timeline ==
=== Background ===
According to U.S. census records, Marvin Alvin Clark was born circa 1852 in Marion County, Iowa. (Note: While the National Missing and Unidentified Persons System notes Clark's age as 69 at the time of his disappearance, United States Census records from 1920 list his birth year as 1852.) Both of his parents were from New York. Clark moved to Oregon with his wife, Mary, by 1910; the 1910 census lists him as a resident of Holbrook. He was at one time the town marshal of Linton, a district that would eventually become part of Portland.

=== Disappearance ===
On October 30, 1926, Clark left his home in Tigard around 1 p.m. to visit his daughter, Mrs. Sidney McDougall, who managed the Hereford Hotel at 735 Hoyt Street in Northwest Portland. Clark was last seen wearing a dark in color suit and hat. The first report of his disappearance, published November 6 in The Morning Oregonian, stated that he had traveled by stagecoach, a later report said he had traveled by bus.

This was the last reported sighting of Clark. Newspaper accounts noted that he suffered from paralysis that limited the use of his right arm and that he walked with a limp, details police hoped would help generate leads. His daughter offered a $100 reward ($1,819 in 2025) for information leading to his discovery.

On November 9, The Bellingham Herald reported that Clark's wife, Mary, had received a "disconnected" postcard reportedly written by her husband that was postmarked in Bellingham, Washington, and that witnesses had seen Clark at two hotels in the area on November 2 and 3. The article stated: "The letter indicated that the aged man's mind is wandering as it was badly jumbled despite the fact that Clark is highly educated, being a graduate of two universities."

=== 1986 discovery of John Doe ===
In 1986, nearly sixty years after Clark's disappearance, loggers discovered a nearly complete human skeleton in the woods between Tigard and Portland. Although no identification was found with the body, an 1888 Liberty Head nickel, a 1919 penny, a pocket watch, leather shoes, a Fraternal Order of Eagles pocket knife, and four tokens with the inscription "D&P" were found near the remains. A .38 caliber revolver and a spent shell were also recovered. A pair of wire‑rimmed glasses was found as well. Upon autopsy, state medical examiner Dr. Karen Gunson observed a bullet hole in the skull and ruled the death a suicide. The estimated age of the John Doe was 35 to 55 years old.

Several days after the discovery, Clark's granddaughter, Dorothy Willoughby, came forward, suspecting the John Doe may have been her missing grandfather, but a positive identification could not be made at the time. Willoughby died in 1991.

=== Subsequent developments ===
In 2011, Dr. Niki Vance of the Oregon state medical examiner's office revisited Clark's missing person file, and forensic pathologists were able to retrieve sufficient DNA from the skeletal remains, which had remained in storage since 1986. A 2014 article in The Oregonian stated that examiners were unable to locate maternal descendants of Clark to make a positive identification. "They're looking for a maternal link," Vance said. "Someone on his mother's side, and following that lineage to shore it up. There's an association there but it's not strong at this point."

In 2018, KOIN-TV reported that Pam Knowles, a great-great-granddaughter of Clark, provided DNA samples along with her son to determine whether the remains belonged to Clark. These samples were sent to the University of North Texas for comparison, where it was determined that the remains were not Clark's. As of 2018, the identity of the John Doe remains unknown. The DNA samples provided by Knowles and her son remain on file with the National Missing and Unidentified Persons System database for potential future comparison.

Rian Hakla, a Multnomah County police officer, stated: "If at any point in the future bones are sent in and it's Marvin, we will get a positive identification. And who's to say he won't get found by a hunter or a landscaper or developer or something like that happens. So, there's a chance he could be found."

== See also ==
- List of people who disappeared
