= Troll Bridge (Oregon) =

Art installation near Portland, Oregon

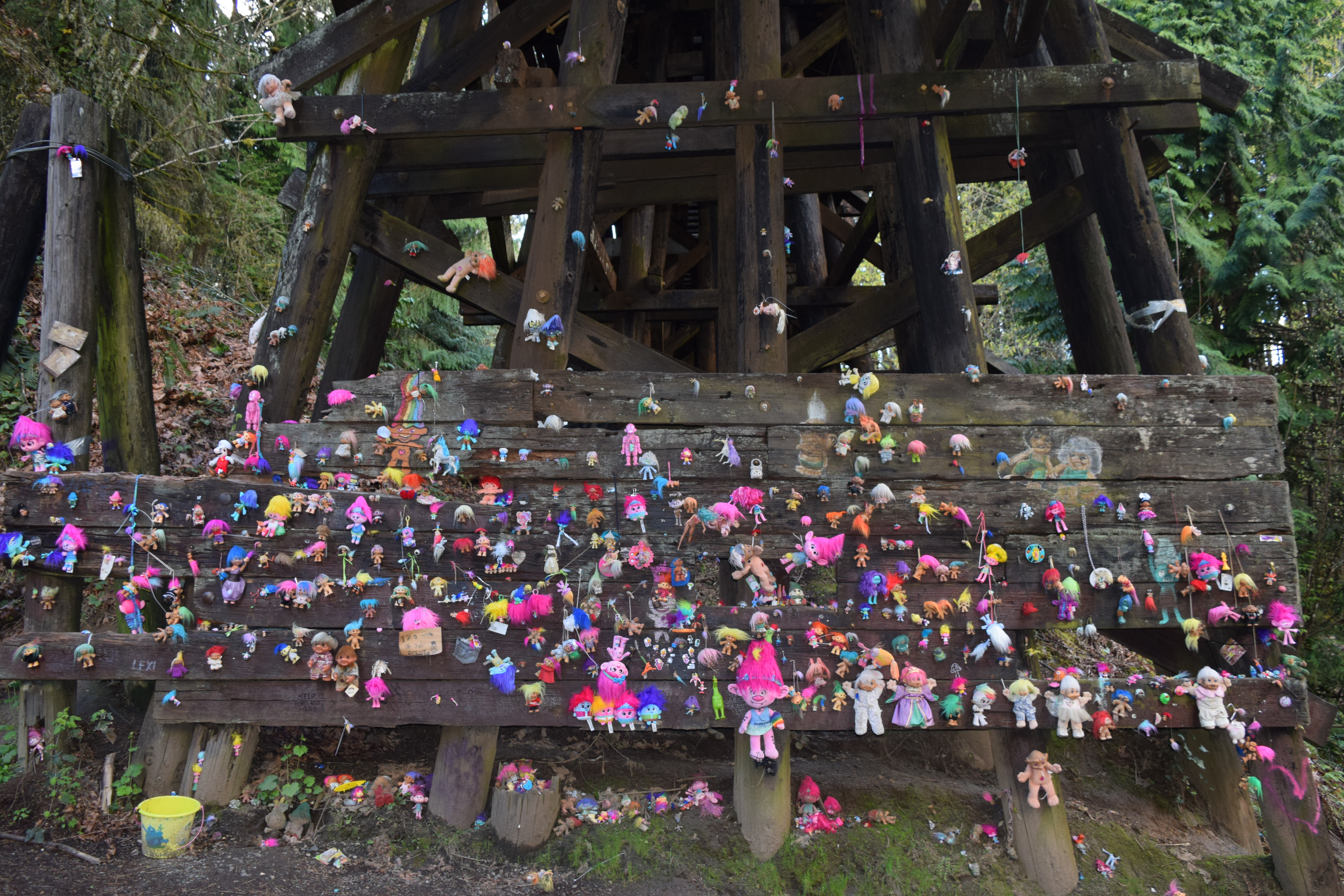
- The bridge in 2024
- Location: Burlington, Oregon, U.S.
- Location within Oregon
- Coordinates: 45°38′50″N 122°50′54″W

The Troll Bridge is an art installation in Burlington, Oregon, an unincorporated community near Portland. The bridge is a Portland and Western Railroad trestle that is decorated with troll dolls, paintings, and similar decorations.

== History ==
The first troll dolls were placed on the bridge in the early 2000s by a mom as a way to surprise her children, who would greet an imaginary troll every time they drove under it. Unknown people added a toy goat and a painting of trolls. Slowly, additional trolls were added to the bridge. Occasionally, some are stolen and others are added, resulting in differing amounts of trolls at different times.
