= Mayville, Oregon =

Unincorporated community in the state of Oregon, United States

- Unincorporated community
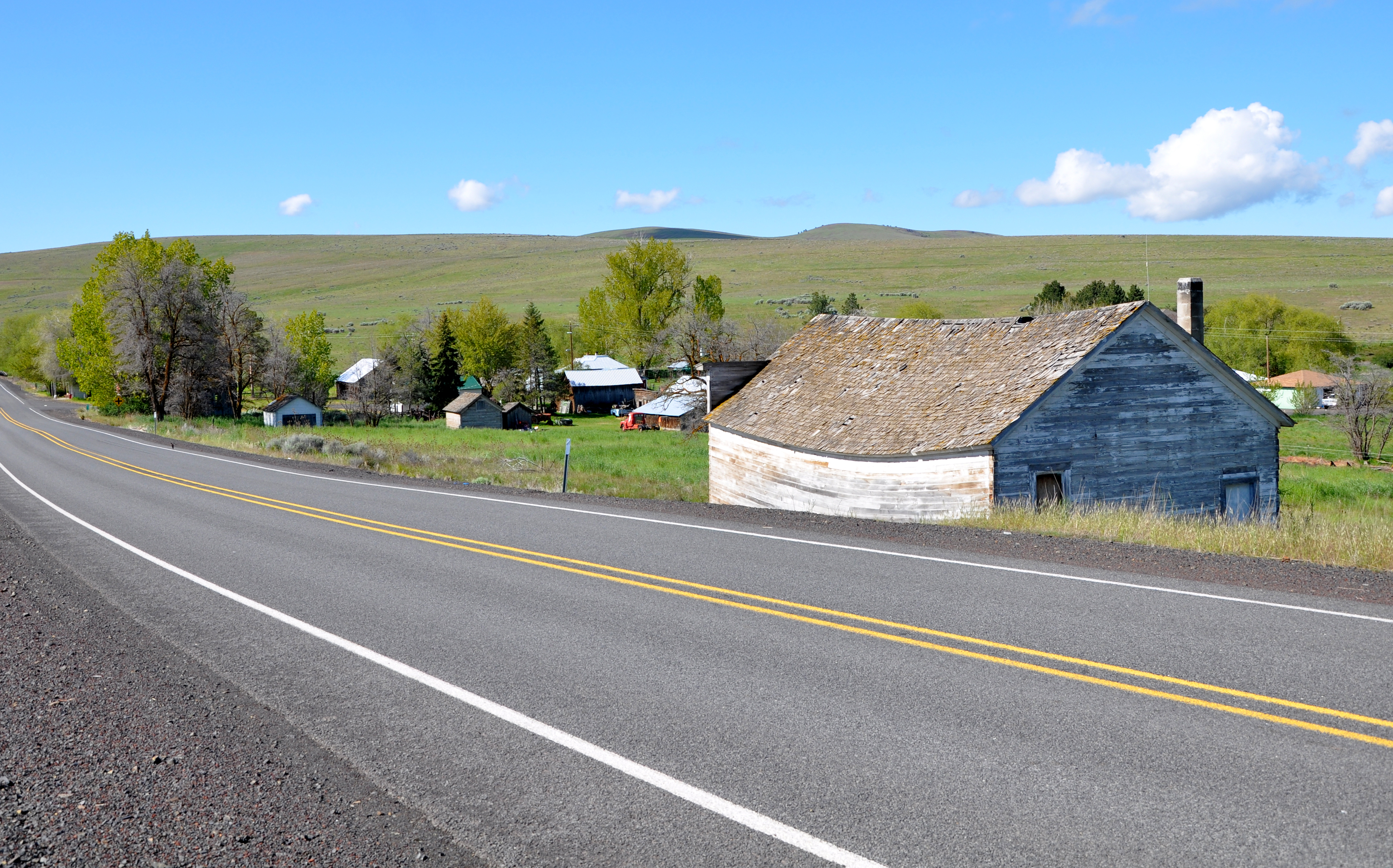
- Mayville from Oregon Route 19
- Interactive map of Mayville, Oregon
- Coordinates: 45°04′56″N 120°11′32″W
- Country: United States
- State: Oregon
- County: Gilliam
- Elevation: 2,963 ft (903 m)
- Time zone: UTC-8 (Pacific (PST))
  - Summer (DST): UTC-7 (PDT)
- ZIP code: 97830
- Area codes: 458 and 541
- GNIS feature ID: 1123881

Mayville is an unincorporated community in Gilliam County, Oregon, United States. It is located on Oregon Route 19. According to 1909 Oregon law, Mayville was the permanent meeting place of the board of commissioners of Gilliam and Wheeler counties. They met in Mayville each year to elect the president of the board. A post office was established in Mayville and "put in operation in October 1884 with Samuel Thornton postmaster." The community's name was originally made by Thornton's wife.

== See also ==
- List of cities and unincorporated communities in Oregon
