= Verboort, Oregon =

Unincorporated community in the state of Oregon, United States

Coordinates: 45.549559°N 123.086774°W

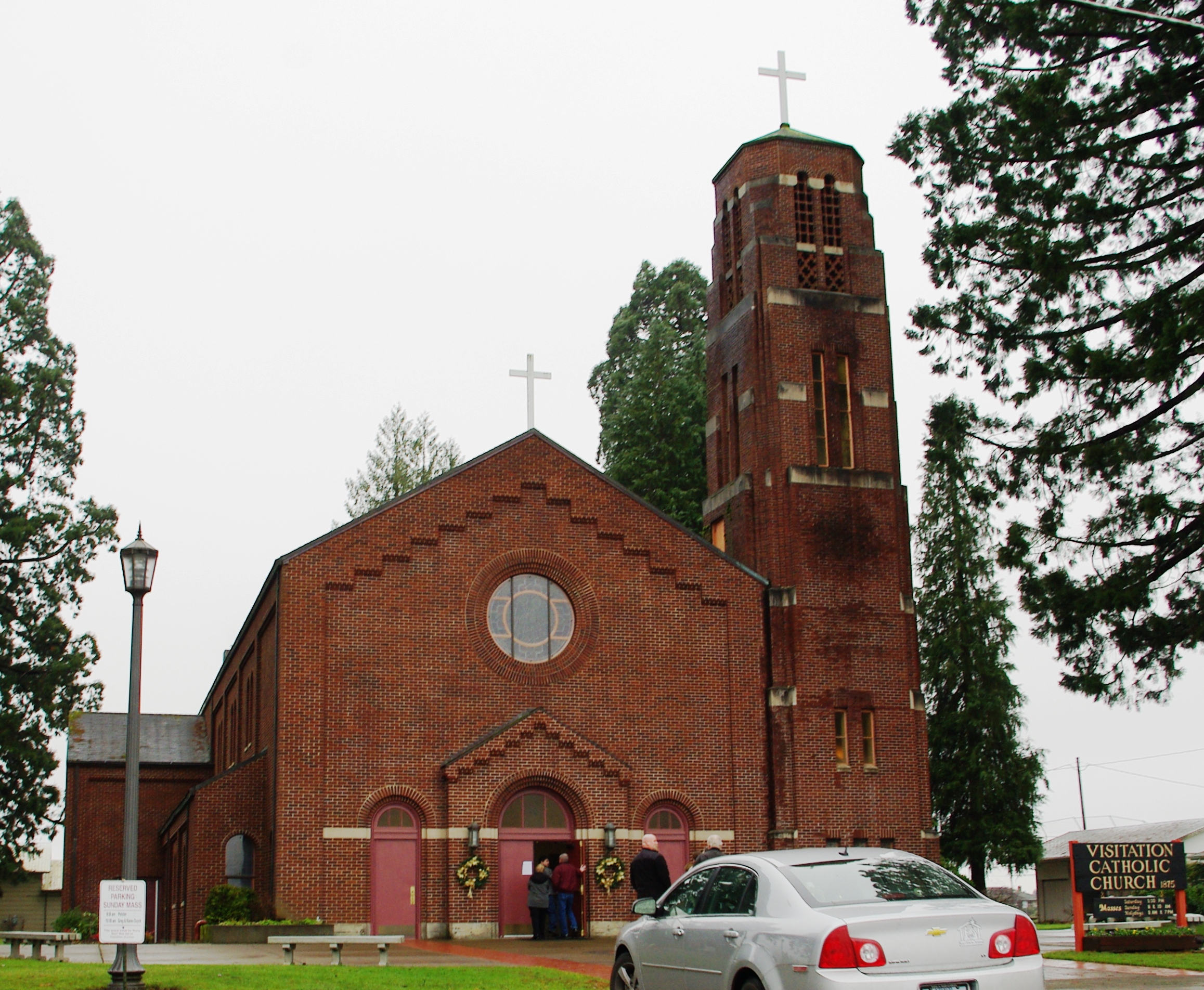
Visitation Catholic Church in Verboort

Verboort is an unincorporated community in Washington County, Oregon, United States. It is located approximately two miles (3.2 km) northeast of Forest Grove, one mile (1.6 km) east of Oregon Route 47 in the Tualatin Valley. The community is part of the Forest Grove Rural Fire Protection District.

== History ==
Verboort was named for early settler Father William Verboort in 1876. Verboort post office was established in 1893 and ran intermittently until 1919.

The community was founded by six Dutch Catholic families. The group was led by John Verboort, who had traveled from the Netherlands with his family and first settled in Wisconsin. In 1875, the group, unhappy with the soil and weather in Wisconsin, bought 550 acres (220 ha) of land in the Verboort area and shared a large house. Father William Verboort, son of John, joined family later that year. Father Verboort and the community built St. Francis Xavier Church, and an informal school was founded at the same time. In 1883, a new church was built and named Our Lady of the Visitation, while the old church was converted into a schoolhouse. The Sisters of St. Mary of Oregon established a convent in Verboort in 1891, and by longstanding tradition, local families provide the sisters with produce. In 1922, the school at Verboort and the Sisters of St. Mary who taught there were affected by the Oregon Compulsory Education Act, which was later overturned by the United States Supreme Court. The current Visitation Church building, with 150-foot (46 m) sequoias on either side, was constructed in 1959. The sequoias were planted in 1888 by John Porter, who brought the seeds back to Oregon from California after returning from the California Gold Rush of 1849.

The church at Verboort established successful missions in Hillsboro, Cornelius, Forest Grove, and Roy (another Dutch Catholic community), which all became self-supporting parishes.

== Arts and culture ==
=== Annual cultural events ===
The annual Verboort Sausage and Sauerkraut Festival, founded in 1934, is held on the first Saturday in November; proceeds go to the upkeep of the church school. The festival, with its sausage and sauerkraut dinner, attracts between 7,800 and 10,000 people each year, while the line for purchasing bulk sausage and sauerkraut starts forming four or five hours before sunrise. In 2008, 15 tons of sausage and 2,000 pounds (910 kg) of sauerkraut were produced for the event. The sausage is smoked using green vine maple wood.

=== Museums and other points of interest ===
Along with the Catholic church and its pioneer cemetery, notable sites in the community include the 1864 house of Henry Black, on whose Donation Land Claim the Verboort family originally settled, the 1921 William Hermans Granary, the 1921 Verboort Garage and General Repairing building, and the 1876 Martin Hermens House and Farm.

== Notable people ==
Major league baseball All-Star pitcher Larry Jansen, member of the Oregon Sports Hall of Fame, was from Verboort.
