= Thatcher, Oregon =

Coordinates: 45.564836°N 123.141498°W

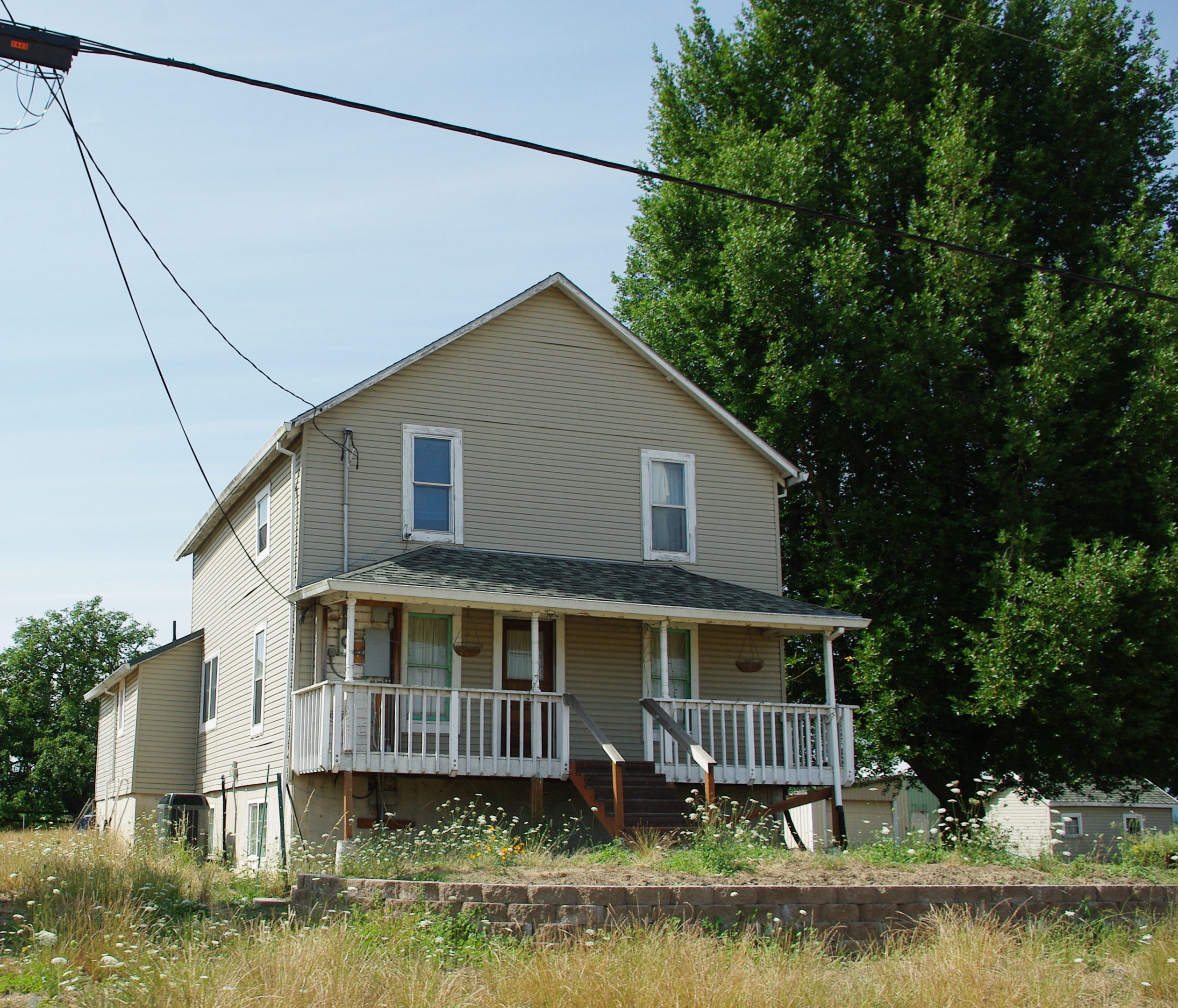
A house at Thatcher along Kansas City Road

Thatcher is an unincorporated historic community in Washington County, Oregon, United States. It was located approximately three miles north of Forest Grove at the intersection of Hillside and Thatcher roads. The area is part of the Forest Grove Rural Fire Protection District.

The community was named after pioneers Harmon and Jemima Thatcher, who came from Indiana soon after their marriage in 1847, first settling in Yamhill County, and later taking up a Donation Land Claim in the area that now bears their name.

A Thatcher post office was established in 1895 and closed in 1902, with the introduction of rural free delivery. According to author Ralph Friedman, as of 1990, nothing remained at the site to indicate a settlement was there

The Thatcher post office was located at 5901 Thatcher Road. The building that formerly housed the post office and the surrounding land was purchased by Carl and Wilma Mayer in 1941. It became their personal family residence until their deaths in 1996. The main post office building is set to be demolished in May 2014. Directly across the road from the old post office building is the Thatcher Grange Hall. The post office land is still owned by descendants of Carl and Wilma Mayer.
