= Norwood, Oregon =

Unincorporated community in the state of Oregon, United States

- Unincorporated community
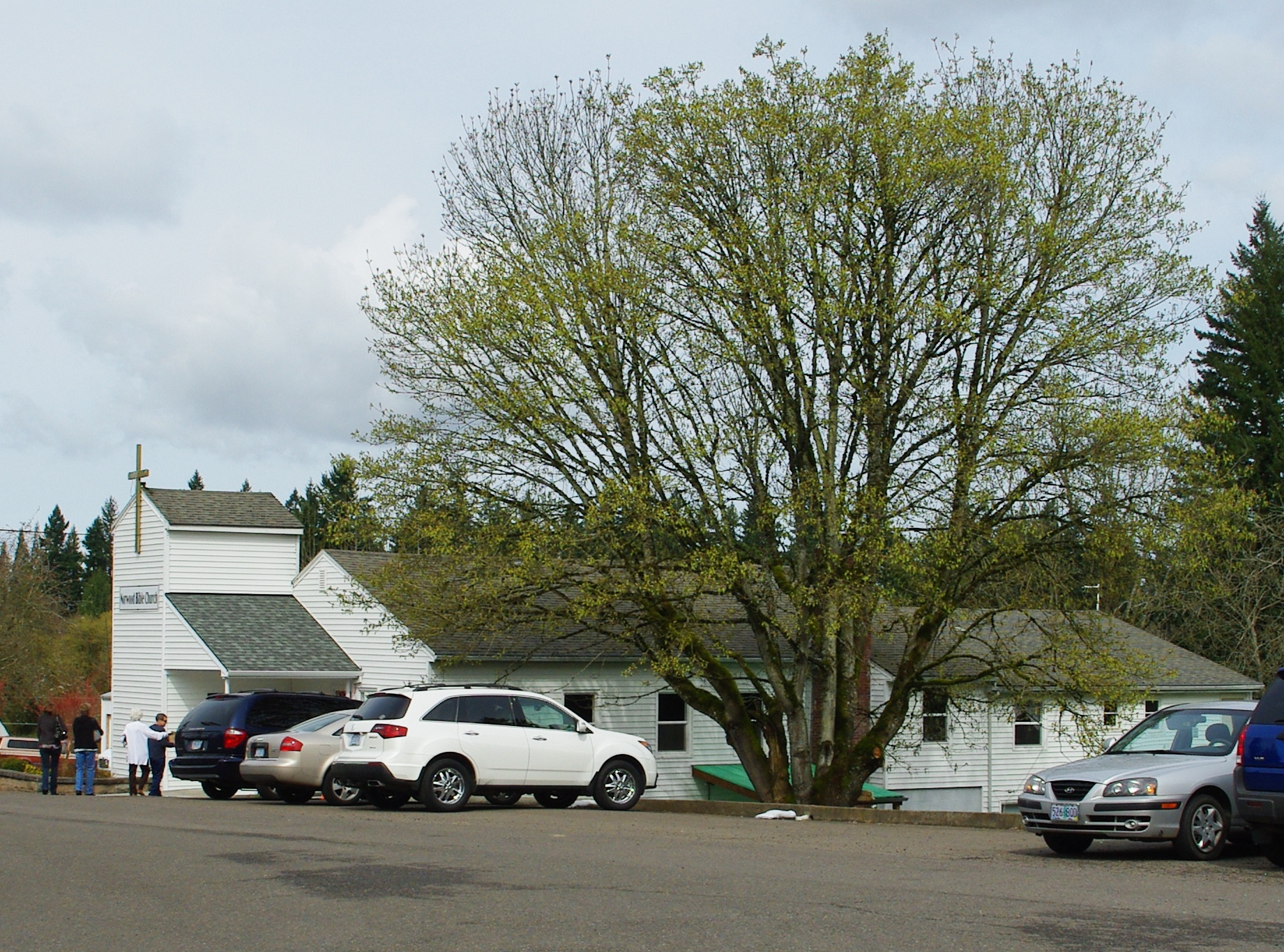
- Norwood Bible Church

- Location within Oregon Location within the United States
- Coordinates: 45.359°N 122.754°W
- Country: United States
- State: Oregon
- County: Washington
- Elevation: 305 ft (93 m)
- Time zone: UTC-8 (Pacific (PST))
  - Summer (DST): UTC-7 (PDT)
- ZIP code: 97062
- Area codes: 503 and 971

Norwood is an unincorporated community in Washington County, Oregon, United States. It is North and South of Tualatin, Oregon and North of Wilsonville, Oregon.
