= Burlington, Multnomah County, Oregon =

Unincorporated community in the state of Oregon, United States

Coordinates: 45°38′46″N 122°50′33″W

Burlington is an unincorporated community in Multnomah County, in the U.S. state of Oregon. It is located southeast of Holbrook on U.S. Route 30 near its intersection with Cornelius Pass Road.

Burlington is home to the Troll Bridge, a historic trestle bridge decorated with toy trolls and paintings.

== History ==
Burlington was platted in 1909. The community had a depot on the railroad. It was a station on the Oregon Electric Railway.
