= Yarnall =

Yarnall is a surname. Notable people with the surname include:

- Bert Yarnall (1892–1943), Scottish footballer
- Celeste Yarnall (1944–2018), American actress
- D. Robert Yarnall (1878–1967), American mechanical engineer
- Ed Yarnall (born 1975), American baseball player
- John Yarnall (1786–1915), American military officer
- Rusty Yarnall (1902–1985), American baseball player

== See also ==
- C. Yarnall Abbott (1870–1938), American painter
- Robert Yarnall Richie (1908–1984), American photographer
