= Elmonica, Oregon =

Unincorporated community in the state of Oregon, United States

Elmonica
- Unincorporated community
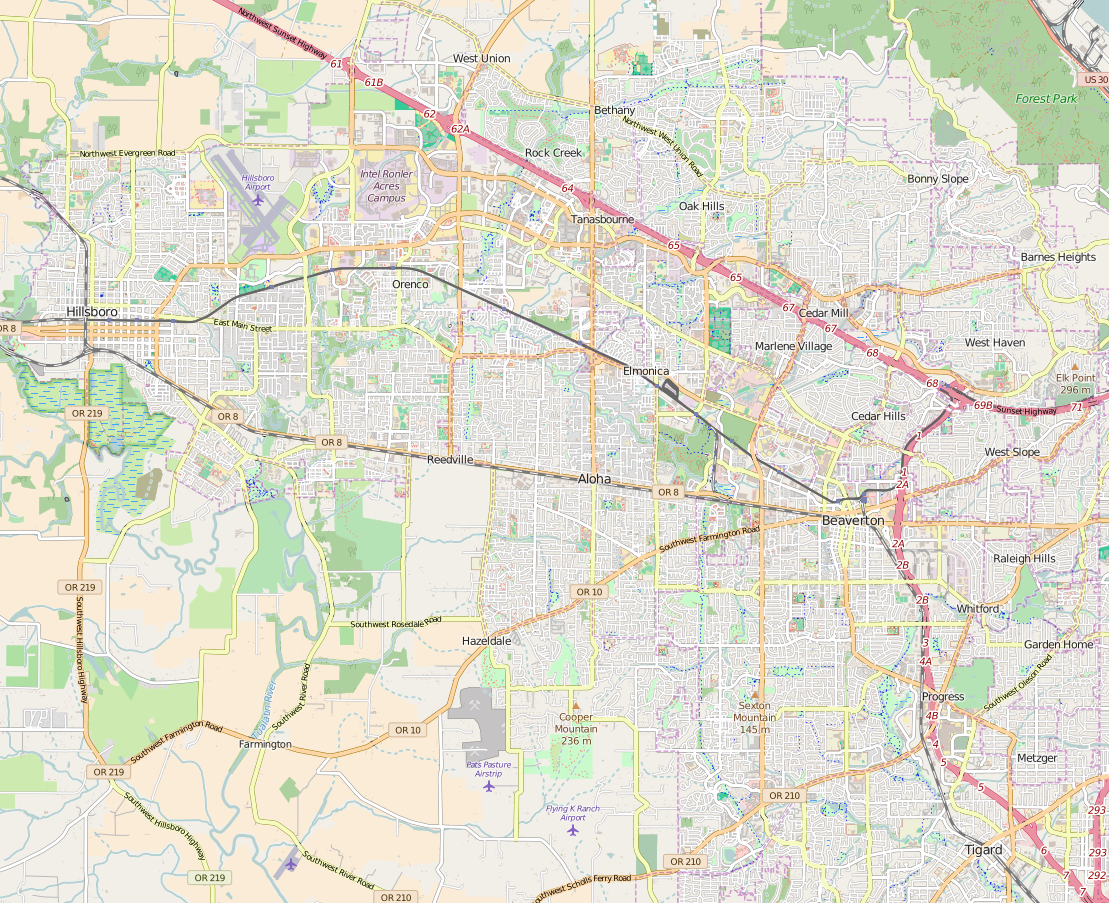
- Location within Washington county
- Coordinates: 45°30′45″N 122°51′17″W
- Country: United States
- State: Oregon
- County: Washington
- Time zone: UTC-8 (Pacific (PST))
  - Summer (DST): UTC-7 (PDT)
- GNIS feature ID: 1637844

Elmonica is an unincorporated community in Washington County, Oregon, United States, located partially in the northwest area of Beaverton. The community is named for a station on the old Oregon Electric Railway, derived from the names of the daughters of an owner of land along the route.

Samuel B. Stoy, a Portland insurance executive, owned property along the proposed OE line and only gave permission for the railroad to go through his property if the company agreed to name the station after his daughters, Eleanor and Monica. After the station was named Elmonica, this then led to the area around the station becoming known as Elmonica as well.
