= Bacona, Oregon =

Unincorporated community in the state of Oregon, United States

Bacona
- Unincorporated community
- Location within Oregon
- Coordinates: 45°46′37″N 123°7′19″W
- Country: United States
- State: Oregon
- County: Washington
- Elevation: 2,034 ft (620 m)
- Time zone: UTC-8 (Pacific (PST))
  - Summer (DST): UTC-7 (PDT)
- ZIP Codes: 97109
- GNIS feature ID: 1135823

Bacona is an unincorporated community in northern Washington County, Oregon, United States.

== History ==
The Bacona post office operated from May 24, 1897, until January 31, 1934. Bacona was named for the first postmaster, Cyrus Bacon. Before then, the area was known as Myrtle Point. In part due to the Tillamook Burn of 1933, the community went into a decline and now has very few inhabitants, down from a peak of 70 in 1915.

A sawmill, owned by Peter Hoffman, operated in the area and employed eight men.
