= Peoria, Oregon =

Unincorporated community in the state of Oregon, United States

- Census-designated place
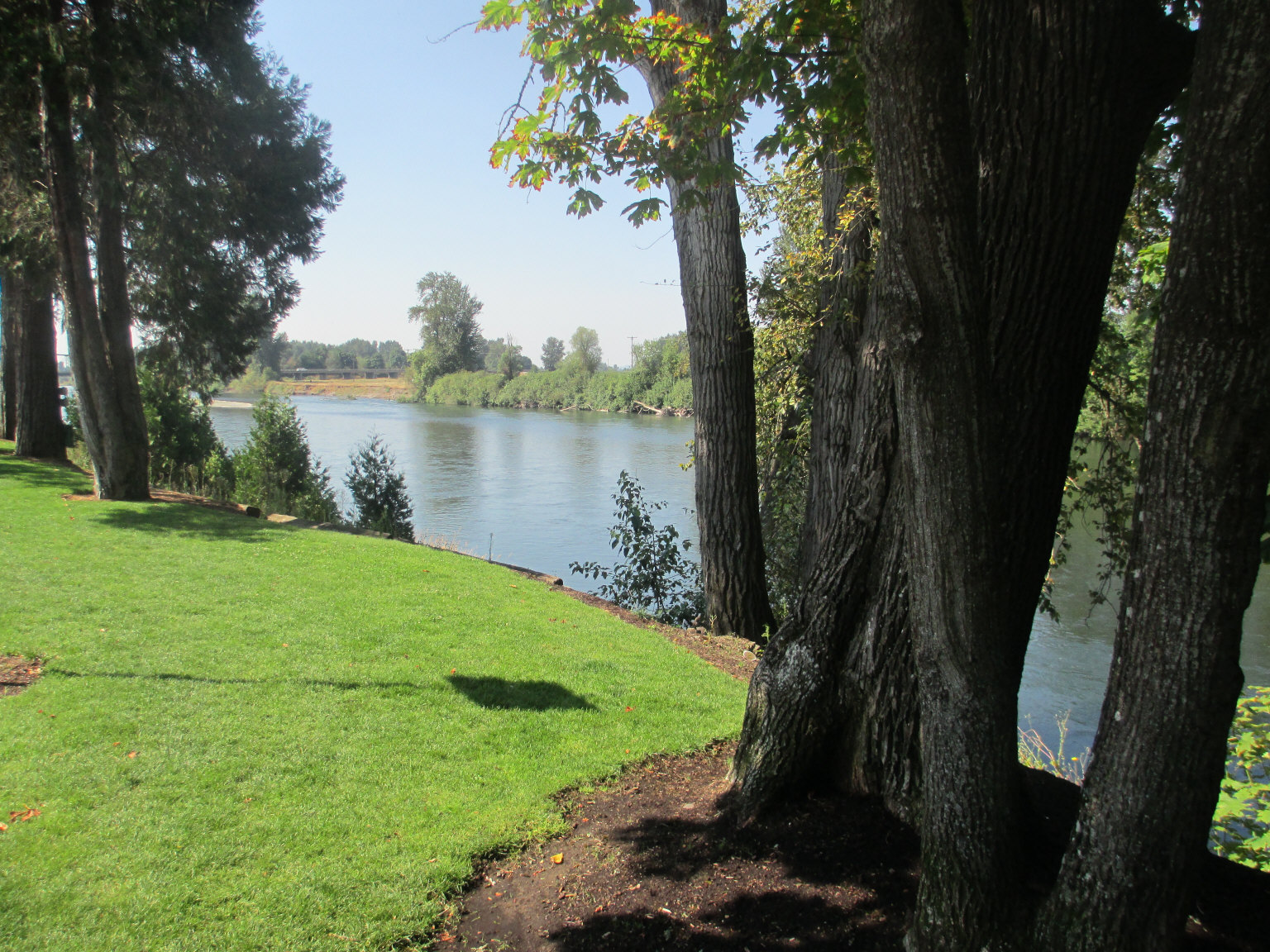
- Willamette River at Peoria

- Location within Oregon Location within the United States
- Coordinates: 44°27′03″N 123°12′15″W
- Country: United States
- State: Oregon
- County: Linn

Area
  - Total: 0.47 sq mi (1.23 km^{2})
  - Land: 0.47 sq mi (1.23 km^{2})
  - Water: 0 sq mi (0.00 km^{2})
- Elevation: 259 ft (79 m)

Population (2020)
  - Total: 103
  - Density: 216.8/sq mi (83.72/km^{2})
- Time zone: UTC-8 (Pacific)
  - Summer (DST): UTC-7 (Pacific)
- Area code: 541
- FIPS code: 41-57300
- GNIS feature ID: 2584420

Peoria is an unincorporated community and census-designated place (CDP) in Linn County, Oregon, United States. It is on the right bank of the Willamette River at river mile 141 between Eugene and Corvallis. Lacking stores and services, it is a cluster of houses plus a county park along Peoria Road, about 8 miles (13 km) south of Oregon Route 34 and 12 miles (19 km) north of Harrisburg. As of the 2020 census, Peoria had a population of 103.

== History ==
Peoria, named for Peoria, Illinois, was first settled in 1851 by H. A. McCartney. By 1875, the community was prosperous enough to have four grain warehouses and a school with 60 pupils. However, after the Oregon and California Railroad established a line through Shedd and Halsey further east, business in Peoria declined.

A post office in this vicinity opened in 1855 under the name "Burlington". The name was changed to "Peoria" in 1857, and the office closed in 1900. Through the early decades of the 20th century, a river ferry operated out of Peoria.

== Demographics ==
Historical population
Census	Pop.	Note	%±
2020	103		—
U.S. Decennial Census
