= Millwood (surname) =

Millwood is a surname. Notable people with the surname include:

- Ezroy Millwood (1942–2012), Jamaican businessman
- Kevin Millwood (born 1974), American baseball pitcher
- Machel Millwood (born 1979), Jamaican soccer player
