= Lehman Springs, Oregon =

Unincorporated community in the state of Oregon, United States

- Unincorporated community
- Location within Oregon Location within the United States
- Coordinates: 45°09′10″N 118°39′43″W
- Country: United States
- State: Oregon
- County: Umatilla
- Elevation: 4,357 ft (1,328 m)
- Time zone: UTC-8 (Pacific (PST))
  - Summer (DST): UTC-7 (PDT)
- ZIP code: 97880
- Area codes: 458 and 541
- GNIS feature ID: 1144928

Lehman Springs is an unincorporated community in Umatilla County, Oregon, United States. Lehman Springs was named after pioneer James Lehman. Its post office was established on September 8, 1899, and it closed on February 29, 1928. Lehman Springs is now served by the Ukiah post office.
