= Mulloy, Oregon =

Unincorporated community in the state of Oregon, United States

- Unincorporated community
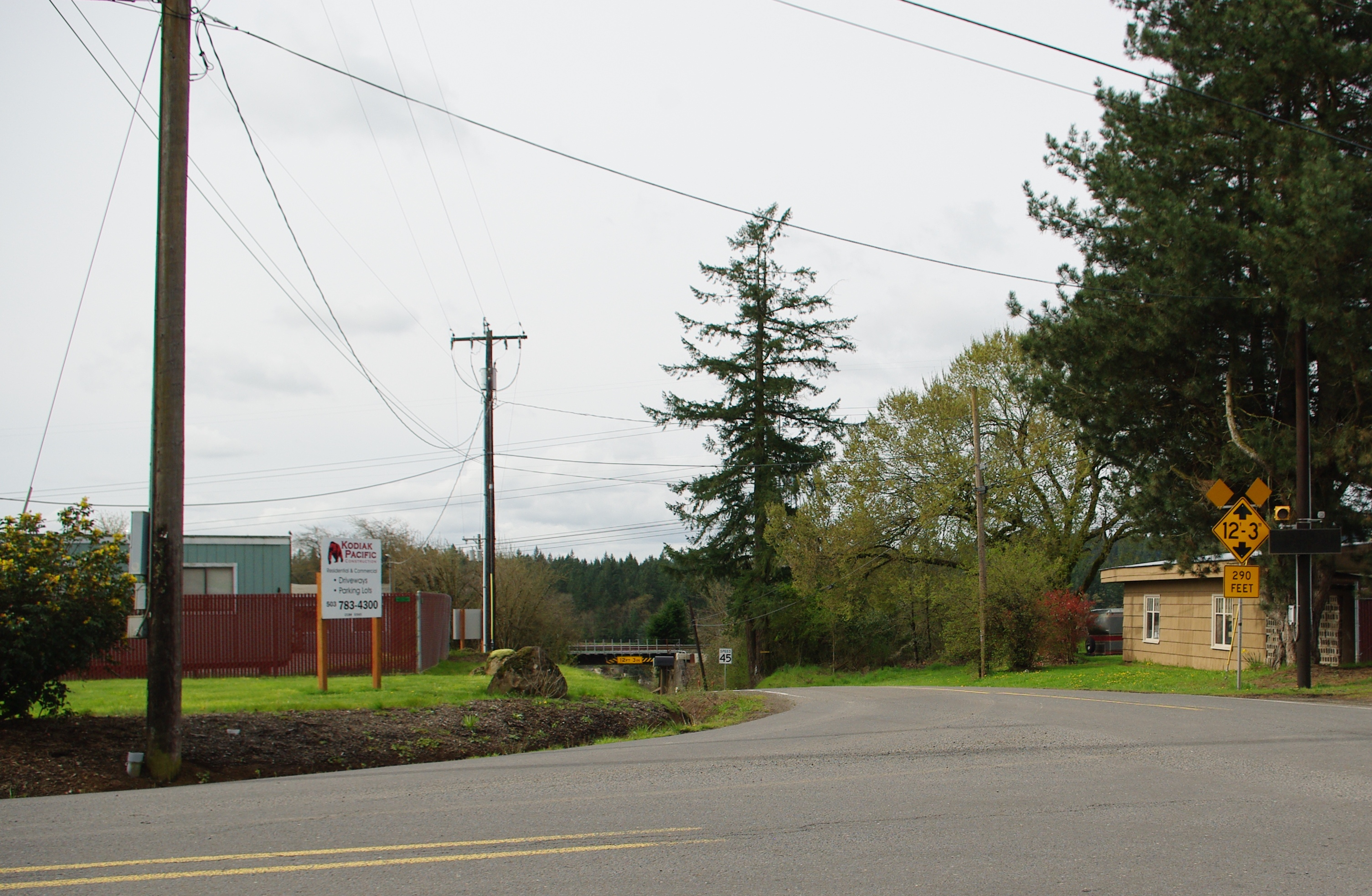
- Intersection of Grahams Ferry Road and Clutter Road at Mulloy

- Location within Oregon Location within the United States
- Coordinates: 45.3337302°N 122.7903740°W
- Country: United States
- State: Oregon
- County: Washington
- Elevation: 213 ft (65 m)

Population (1920)
  - Total: 59
- Time zone: UTC-8 (Pacific (PST))
  - Summer (DST): UTC-7 (PDT)
- ZIP code: 97140
- Area codes: 503 and 971

Mulloy is an unincorporated community in Washington County, Oregon, United States, with a population of 59 in 1920.
