= Carnation (painting) =

Carnation (Latin, caro, carnis, “flesh”), in painting, refers to the representation of color of flesh. It is also used in describing a painting or drawing to signify the undraped parts of a figure.

== Usage ==
The use of carnation requires very attentive study and great skill in the painter. It varies with the gender of the individual, with the classes and countries to which the subjects belong, with the passions, the state of the health, etc. The cheeks are, in a healthy subject, of a lively red; the breast, neck and upper part of the arms of a soft white; the belly yellowish. At the extremities the color becomes colder, and at the points assumes a violet tint, on account of the transparency of the skin. All these shades require to be softly blended. Two faults in carnation are mainly to be avoided: hardness, the fault of the masters of the 15th century, and too great weakness. Guido Reni not infrequently painted his flesh so it appeared almost bloodless. The French school has gone furthest in this respect. The flesh of the followers of this school often looks like porcelain or wax. Titian and Rubens are unrivaled in their rendering of carnation.
