= Roy, Oregon =

Unincorporated community in the state of Oregon, United States

- Unincorporated community
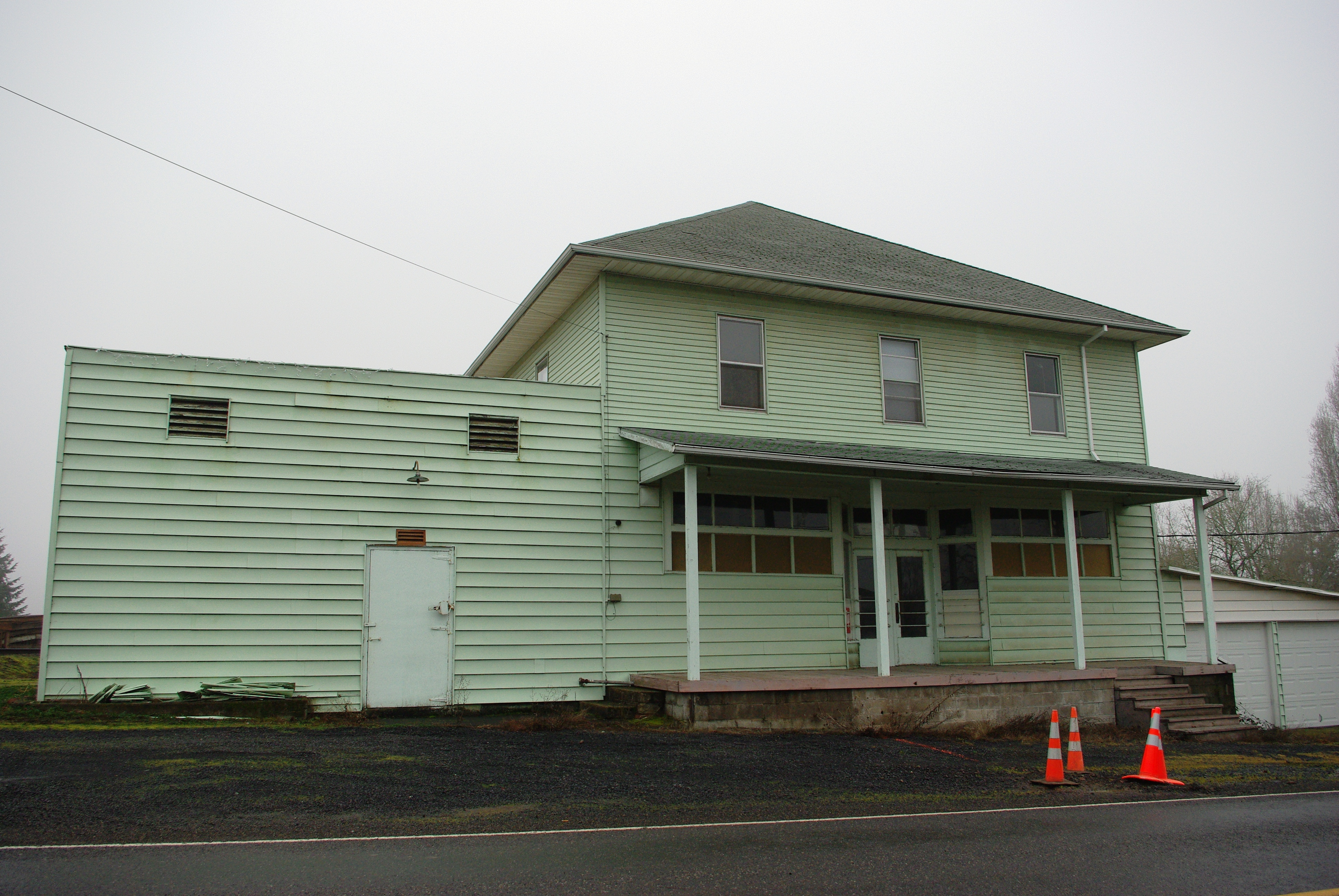
- Former store in Roy

- Location within the state of Oregon Roy, Oregon (the United States)
- Coordinates: 45°35′40″N 123°4′56″W
- Country: United States
- State: Oregon
- County: Washington
- Time zone: UTC-8 (Pacific (PST))
  - Summer (DST): UTC-7 (PDT)
- ZIP code: 97106
- Area codes: 503 and 971
- GNIS feature ID: 1163236

Roy is an unincorporated historical community in Washington County, Oregon, United States. It is located south of the Sunset Highway (U.S. 26) and southeast of the city of Banks.

Circa 1905, representatives of the Pacific Railway and Navigation Company, interested in putting a rail line through from Hillsboro to Tillamook on the coast, began approaching farmers living northeast of Greenville. With the railroad coming through the Tualatin Valley a mile north of the Vandervelden farm, William Vandervelden and his sons, J.W. and Frank, decided to buy land around the intended railway went through Lewis Roy's place, thus the road crossing was called Roy. The railroad went through that region in 1907, and a new church was built north of the tracks in 1908. Roy post office was established in 1907 and named for the Roy family, who were local pioneers.

In 1908, a Catholic school called St. Ferdinand's opened in the local church. A standalone wood-framed school opened in September 1912, which was renamed as St. Francis of Assisi Catholic School in 1920. The railroad reached Roy in 1912. St. Francis moved into a new brick building in 1951. Roy post office closed in 1955. Locations in Roy currently have Banks mailing addresses. Different parts of the area are served by the Forest Grove Rural Fire Protection District, Banks Rural Fire Protection District, and Washington County Fire District 2.
