= Riverwood, Oregon =

Unincorporated community in the state of Oregon, United States

- Unincorporated community
- Location within Oregon Location within the United States
- Coordinates: 45°26′38″N 122°39′49″W
- Country: United States
- State: Oregon
- County: Multnomah
- Elevation: 436 ft (133 m)
- Time zone: UTC-8 (Pacific (PST))
  - Summer (DST): UTC-7 (PDT)
- ZIP code: 97219
- Area codes: 503 and 971
- GNIS feature ID: 1166703

Riverwood (formerly Riverside) is an unincorporated community in Multnomah County, Oregon.

== See also ==
- Riverside, Oregon (disambiguation)
