= Lunnville, Oregon =

Unincorporated community in the state of Oregon, United States

- Unincorporated community
- Location within Oregon Location within the United States
- Coordinates: 45°21′01″N 123°10′29″W
- Country: United States
- State: Oregon
- County: Yamhill
- Elevation: 187 ft (57 m)
- Time zone: UTC-8 (Pacific (PST))
  - Summer (DST): UTC-7 (PDT)
- ZIP code: 97148
- Area codes: 503 and 971
- GNIS feature ID: 1163115

Lunnville is an unincorporated community in Yamhill County, Oregon, United States.
