= Yarnell, Oregon =

- Location within Oregon Location within the United States
- Coordinates: 44°4′59″N 122°57′44″W
- Country: United States
- State: Oregon
- County: Lane
- Established: 1901
- Elevation: 472 ft (144 m)
- Time zone: UTC-8 (Pacific (PST))
  - Summer (DST): UTC-7 (PDT)
- GNIS feature ID: 1130823

Yarnell is an unincorporated historic locale in Lane County, Oregon, United States. It was located about 5 miles south of Mohawk, in the Mohawk Valley.

Yarnell was a station on the now-defunct Marcola line of the Southern Pacific Railroad. It was established in 1901, and was likely named for Jere Yarnell, a local resident listed as living in the area in the 1880 census. There was a Yarnell covered bridge about a mile north of the station that carried Hill Road over the Mohawk River. The bridge was built in 1916 and demolished in 1958. In 1915 there was a Yarnell School.
