= McKee, Oregon =

Unincorporated community in the state of Oregon, United States

- Unincorporated community
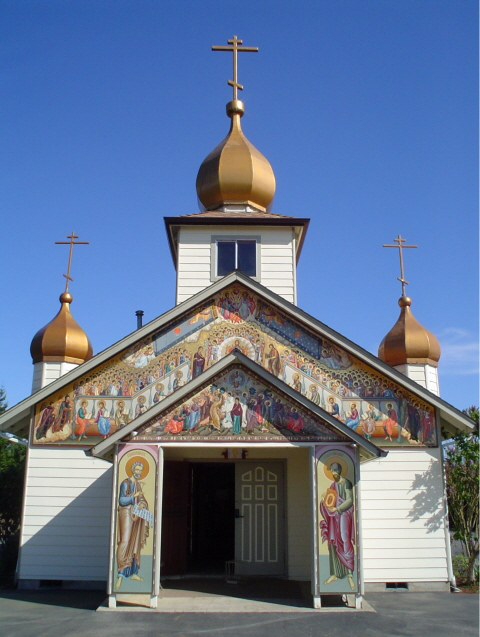
- Old Believer church in McKee

- Location within Oregon Location within the United States
- Coordinates: 45°05′59″N 122°48′29″W
- Country: United States
- State: Oregon
- County: Marion
- Elevation: 180 ft (55 m)
- Time zone: UTC-8 (Pacific (PST))
  - Summer (DST): UTC-7 (PDT)
- ZIP code: 97071
- Area codes: 503 and 971
- GNIS feature ID: 1130469

McKee is an unincorporated community in Marion County, Oregon, United States. Its post office was established on March 12, 1888, and David McKee was the first postmaster. It closed in June 1924.
