= Carnation, Oregon =

Unincorporated community in the state of Oregon, United States

Carnation
- Unincorporated community
- Location within the state of Oregon Carnation (the United States)
- Coordinates: 45°30′27″N 123°06′09″W
- Country: United States
- State: Oregon
- County: Washington
- Time zone: UTC-8 (Pacific (PST))
  - Summer (DST): UTC-7 (PDT)

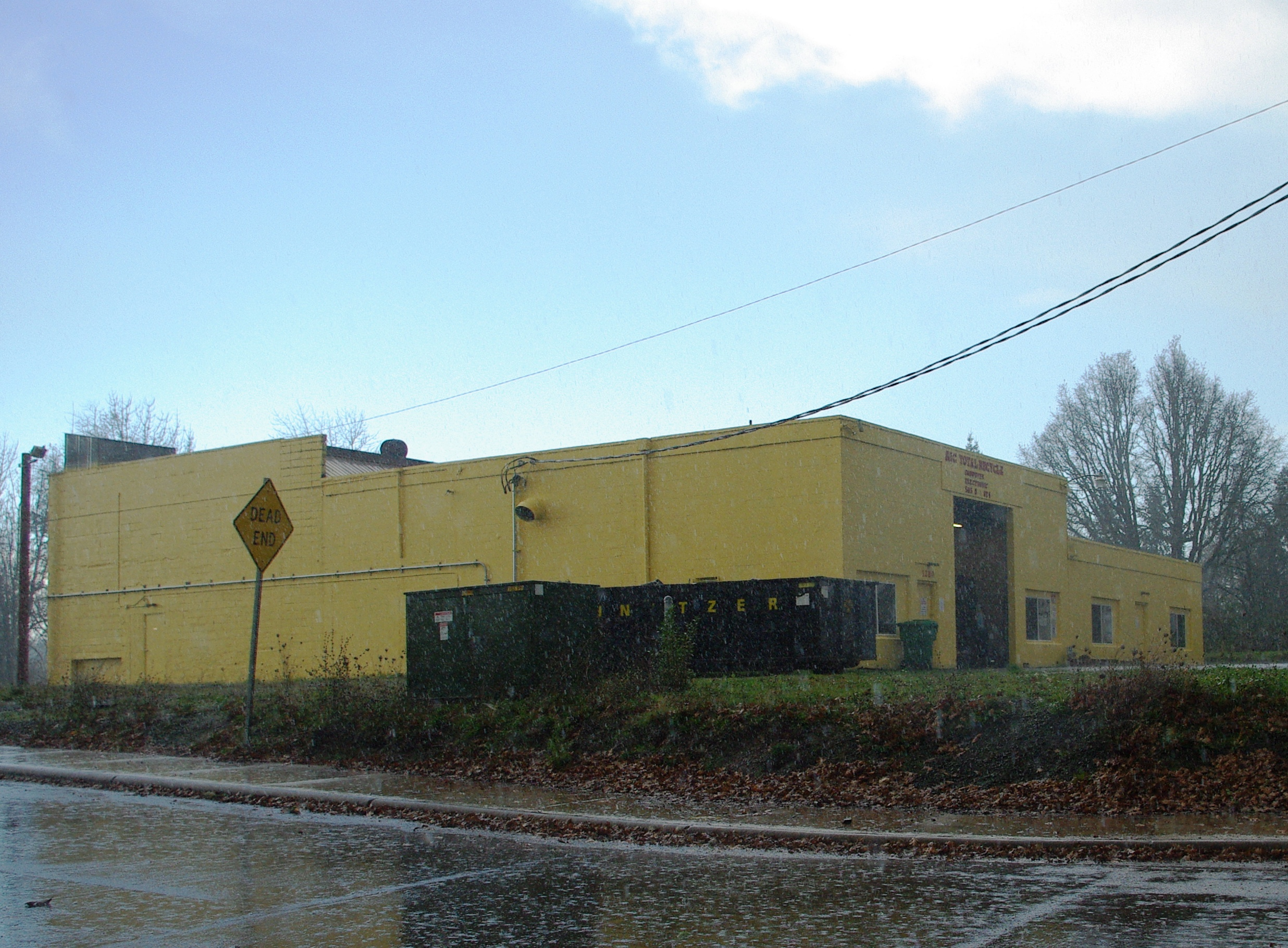
A building in Carnation

Carnation is an unincorporated community in Washington County, Oregon, United States. Carnation lies on Oregon Route 47, on the south side of Forest Grove. Originally called South Forest Grove by white settlers, it was later dubbed Carnation after the flagship product of the Pacific Coast Condensed Milk Company, later called the Carnation Milk Products Company, which opened Oregon's largest condensery there in 1902. The company was lured by the confluence of easy rail transportation and plentiful dairy suppliers.

The community had its own post office during 1905–1906, and again from 1914–c. 1933. The original post office was established on May 20, 1905, in the store of Clarence L. Bump, who was also the first postmaster.

The Oregon & California Railroad built its depot in Carnation, which was linked to downtown Forest Grove by a streetcar starting in May 1906. The transportation company that managed the streetcar went out of business in 1911, and the line was discontinued.

The area is now part of the Forest Grove Rural Fire Protection District. Addresses here are listed as part of Forest Grove.

The area is home to the historic Alvin T. Smith House and the SakéOne brewery, kura and tasting room.
