= Mohawk, Oregon =

Unincorporated community in the state of Oregon, United States

- Unincorporated community
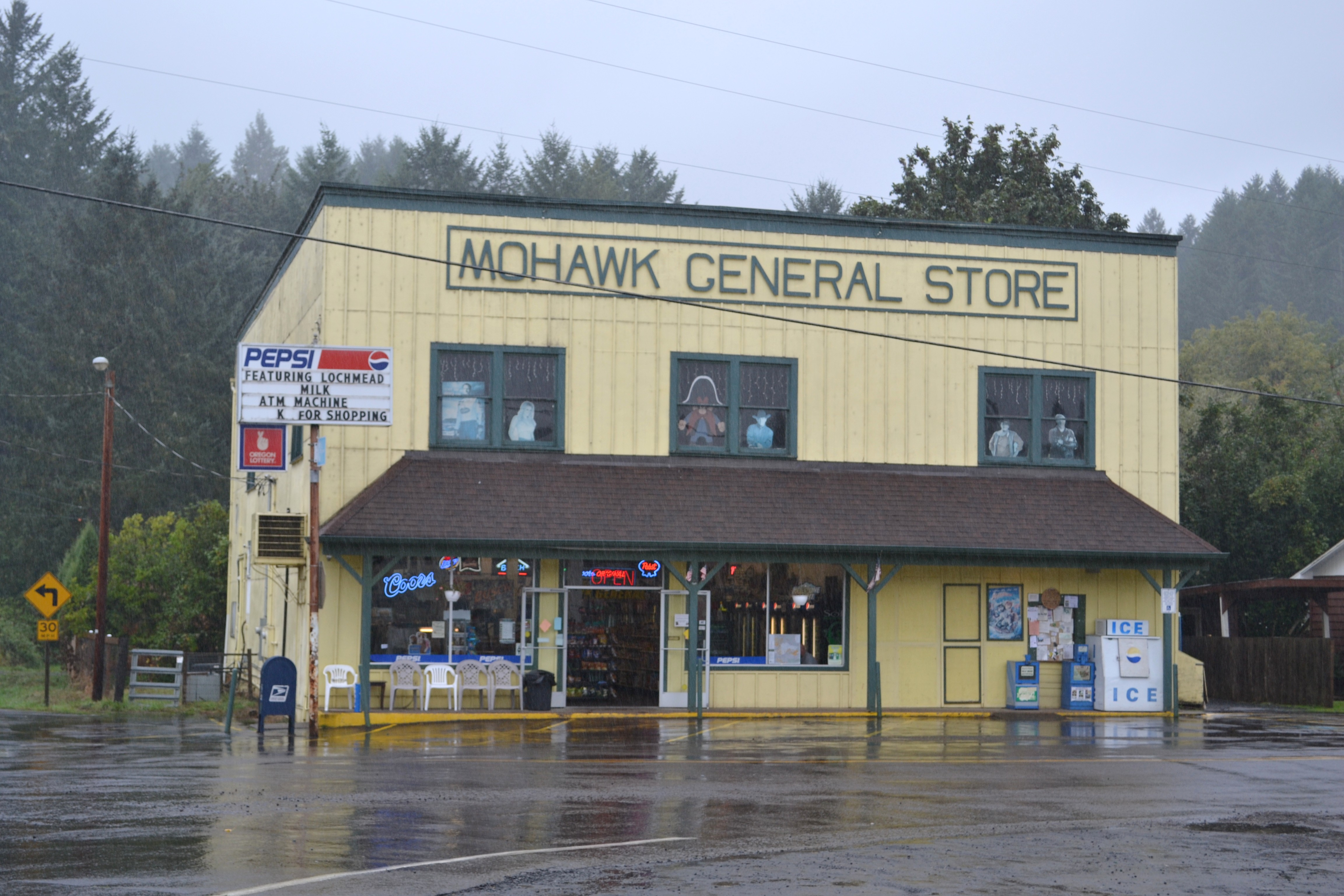
- Mohawk General Store

- Location within Oregon Location within the United States
- Coordinates: 44°8′32″N 122°54′58″W
- Country: United States
- State: Oregon
- County: Lane
- Elevation: 509 ft (155 m)
- Time zone: UTC-8 (Pacific (PST))
  - Summer (DST): UTC-7 (PDT)
- ZIP code: 97478
- Area codes: 458 and 541
- GNIS feature ID: 1158097

Mohawk is an unincorporated community in Lane County, Oregon, United States, on the Mohawk River, about seven miles upstream from Springfield.

When a post office was established at this locale in 1862, it was named "Mohawk" after the river. The post office operated intermittently, and after being converted to a rural station in 1958, it was finally terminated in 1961. When the Southern Pacific Railroad established a station on the Marcola line there, it was named "Donna". Historically there was also a nearby locale known as "Mohawk Post".
