= Burlington, Linn County, Oregon =

Unincorporated community in the state of Oregon, United States

Coordinates: 44.4470670°N 123.2053742°W

Burlington is an unincorporated historic community Linn County, in the U.S. state of Oregon. It was located about a mile downriver from Peoria.

== History ==
The town began with a ferry across the Willamette River run by John Smith, and a store owned by John Donald. James Freeman platted the townsite in 1853, at which time it had two houses, two stores, a blacksmith shop, and the ferry. The river silted up and made the boat landings inaccessible so the town's population soon dwindled. Some of the buildings were moved to Peoria. Burlington post office was established in 1855 and ran until 1857 when it was renamed Peoria and likely moved to the other town. Burlington was located on the Donation Land Claim of James Martin who came to Oregon from Little York, Illinois. A family tradition among Martin's descendants holds that Burlington was named after Burlington, Iowa, the nearest market town to Little York. Today Burlington, Oregon is considered a ghost town.

== See also ==
- Historic ferries of Oregon
