= Riverview, Umatilla County, Oregon =

Riverview, Oregon
- Unincorporated community
- Location within the state of Oregon
- Coordinates: 45°55′09″N 119°11′47″W
- Country: United States
- State: Oregon
- County: Umatilla
- Elevation: 417 ft (127 m)
- Time zone: UTC-8 (Pacific (PST))
  - Summer (DST): UTC-7 (PDT)
- Area codes: 458 and 541
- GNIS feature ID: 1167815
- Coordinates and elevation from Geographic Names Information System

Riverview is an unincorporated historic community in Umatilla County, Oregon, United States. Riverview was a station of the Union Pacific Railroad, near the Columbia River and north of U.S. Route 730.
