= Riverside, Yamhill County, Oregon =

Unincorporated community in the state of Oregon, United States

Riverside
- Unincorporated community
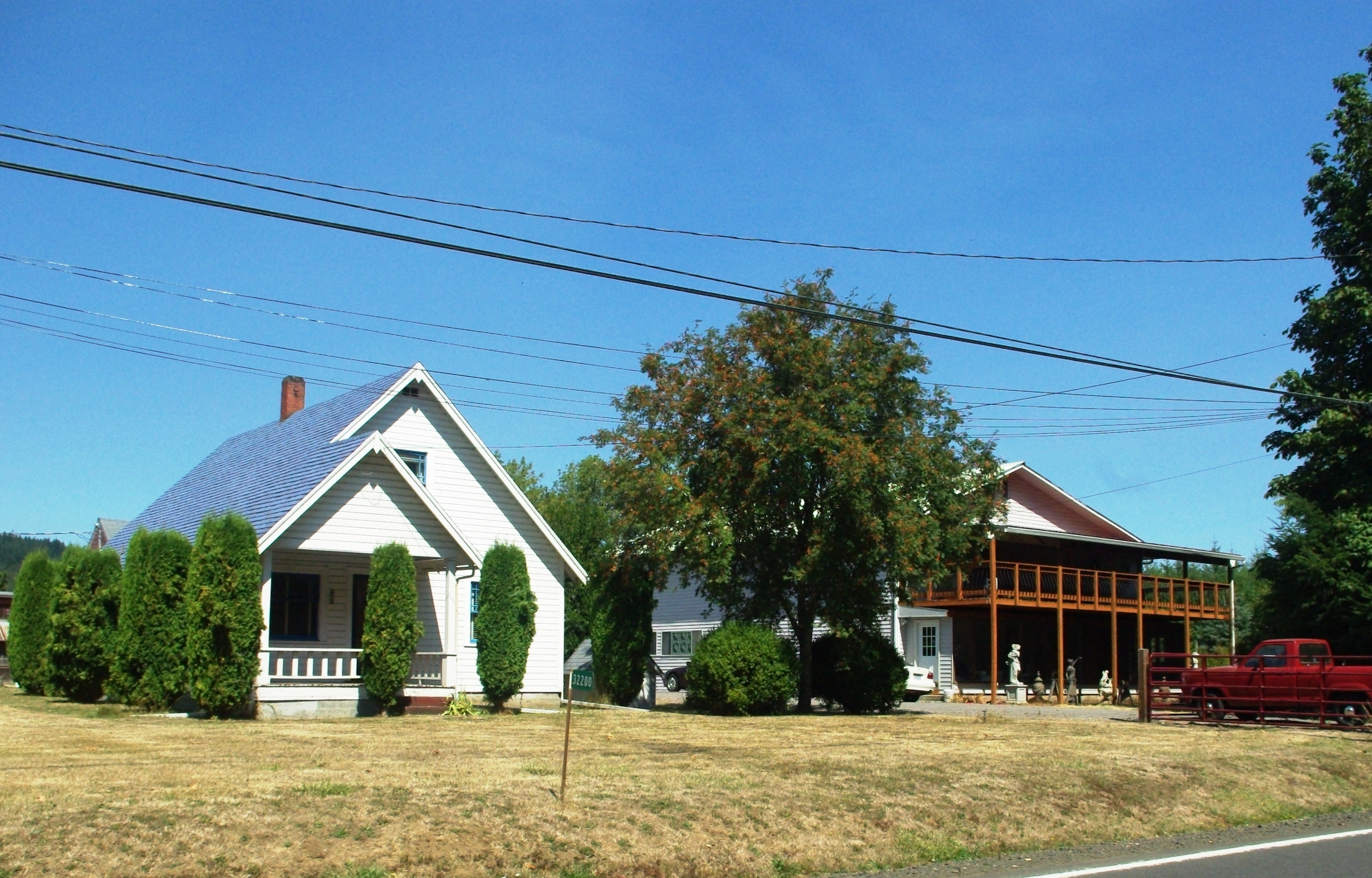
- Houses in the community

- Location within the state of Oregon Riverside (the United States)
- Coordinates: 45°05′19″N 123°27′09″W
- Country: United States
- State: Oregon
- County: Yamhill
- Elevation: 213 ft (65 m)
- Time zone: UTC-8 (Pacific (PST))
  - Summer (DST): UTC-7 (PDT)
- GNIS feature ID: 1163488

Riverside is an unincorporated historic locale in Yamhill County, Oregon, United States. It lies at an elevation of 213 feet (65 m).
