= Riverview, Multnomah County, Oregon =

Unincorporated community in the state of Oregon, United States

Riverview, Oregon
- Unincorporated community
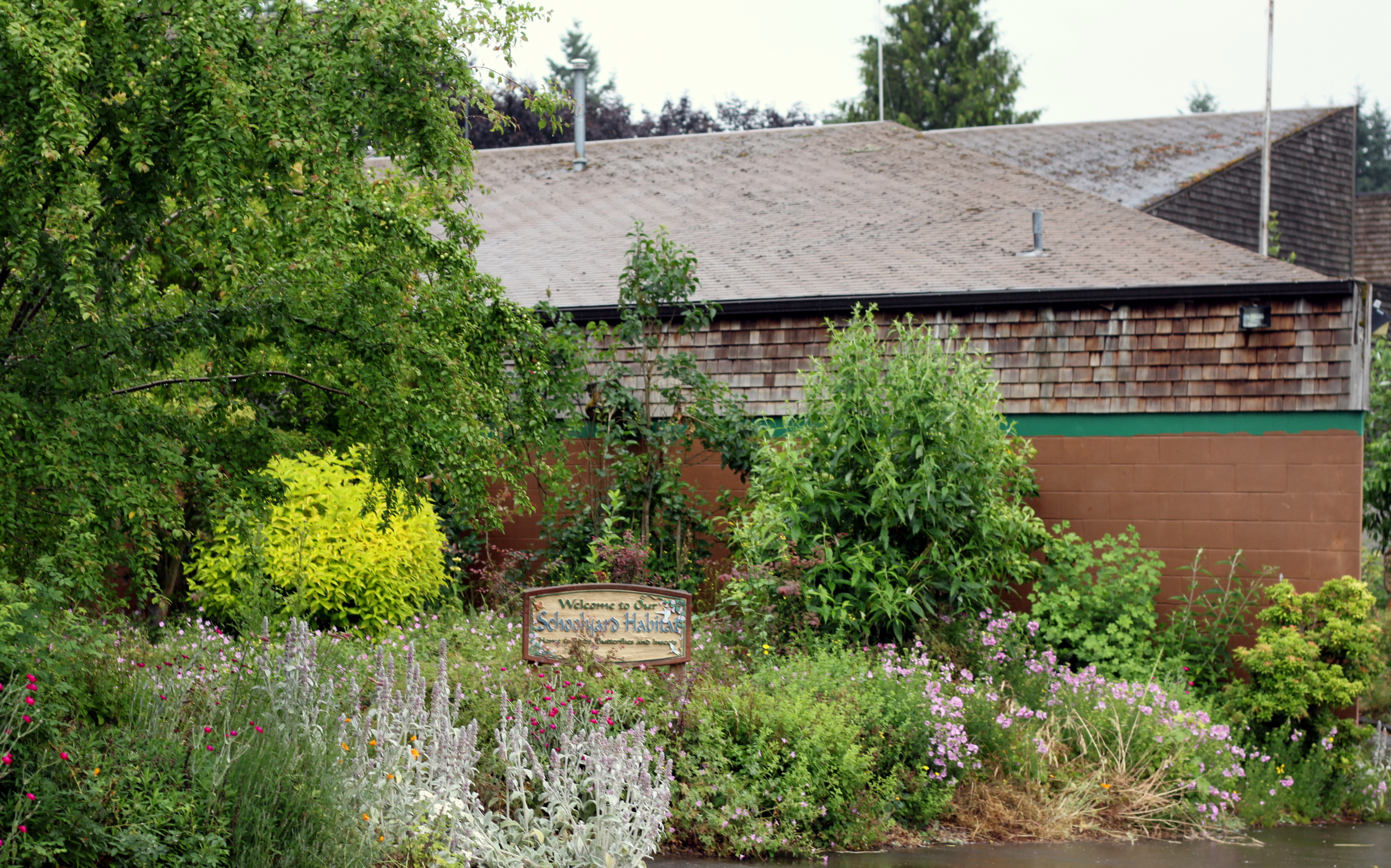
- Sauvie Island School near Riverview

- Location within Oregon Location within the United States
- Coordinates: 45°39′50″N 122°49′14″W
- Country: United States
- State: Oregon
- County: Multnomah
- Elevation: 16 ft (4.9 m)
- Time zone: UTC-8 (Pacific (PST))
  - Summer (DST): UTC-7 (PDT)
- GNIS feature ID: 1164011

Riverview was an unincorporated community on Sauvie Island in Multnomah County, Oregon, United States. However, according to the United States Geological Survey, a settlement named Riverview may not have existed in this location.
