= Millwood, Oregon =

Unincorporated community in the state of Oregon, United States

- Unincorporated community
- Location within Oregon Location within the United States
- Coordinates: 43°23′06″N 123°32′46″W
- Country: United States
- State: Oregon
- County: Douglas
- Elevation: 371 ft (113 m)
- Time zone: UTC-8 (Pacific (PST))
  - Summer (DST): UTC-7 (PDT)
- ZIP code: 97486
- Area codes: 458 and 541
- GNIS feature ID: 1136544

Millwood is an unincorporated community in Douglas County, Oregon, United States. W.B. Clarke, a sawmill builder, named the community, and was the first postmaster of its post office, which operated from June 7, 1886 to July 31, 1931.
