= Holbrook, Oregon =

Unincorporated community in the state of Oregon, United States

Coordinates: 45.659838°N 122.863436°W

Holbrook is an unincorporated community in Multnomah County, Oregon, United States. It is located on U.S. Route 30 about 15 miles northwest of Portland between the Tualatin Mountains and the Multnomah Channel south of Sauvie Island. Holbrook's elevation is 135 feet above sea level.

The community was named for pioneer Philo Holbrook, who owned a farm nearby. Holbrook had a post office from 1887 to 1933.
