= Forest Grove Fire and Rescue =

Coordinates: 45.51865°N 123.1097°W

Operational area
- Country: United States
- State: Oregon
- City: Forest Grove

Agency overview
- Established: February 4, 1894
- Annual calls: 3,307 (2013)
- Employees: 21 (Career - 2015)
- Annual budget: $3,265,402 (2015)
- Staffing: Combination
- Fire chief: Michael Kinkade

Website
- www.forestgrove-or.gov/city-hall/fire-department/fire-department.html

Forest Grove Fire and Rescue is the municipal fire department for the city of Forest Grove, Oregon. Started in 1894, the department has two stations used to provide fire fighting and emergency medical services to both the city and the Forest Grove Rural Fire Protection District. The department also provides administrative support to the neighboring Cornelius Fire Department.

== History ==
Forest Grove started a volunteer fire department on February 4, 1894, with combination of two fire companies. The department was created after bucket brigades were determined to be inefficient, and the two fire companies spent too much time fighting each other. One of the first chiefs was J. G. Lenneville, who was first elected to the post in 1901, and served through at least 1923. In December 1907, the city purchased a hose wagon for $100. The city replaced the fire bell that had been housed at a church and at the Old College Hall at Pacific University with an electric siren in October 1925. A 1907 steamer used by the Portland Fire Bureau was bought by Forest Grove in 1933 for $150, and is still owned by the fire department.

In 1956, the Forest Grove Rural Fire Protection District merged into Forest Grove Fire Department. Following the May 1980 eruptions of Mount St. Helens, the city used the department to clean the ash off of city streets. As of 1980, the Rural District covered 88 square miles (230 km^{2}) and paid 39% of the combined entities' costs, though split capital expenditures at 50–50. At that time the combined department had 11 paid and 45 volunteer firefighters.

One of the largest fires in the city came on July 14, 1982, when four downtown stores were burned, which required four alarms to contain. Firefighters from Gaston, Banks, Hillsboro, Cornelius, and Washington County Fire District 2 all helped put out the fire that caused $800,000 in damage. By 1983 the Rural District had shrunk to 80 square miles (210 km^{2}) with 6,000 residents. The department converted an old 1973 Seagrave into a new pumper truck in 1984, saving $40,000 over buying a new piece of apparatus.

The Spring Break Quake in 1993 damaged the main fire station on Ash Street in downtown, which was later repaired. In late 2006 and early 2007 the department was surrounded by turmoil concerning then chief Bob Mills as well as forgeries by Gary Clay Davis on fire inspection reports. The city was contracted by neighboring Cornelius in 2010 to provide administrative support to that city's combined city and rural fire department. In 2012, the department added living quarters to Station 7 in Gales Creek.

== Apparatus and stations ==
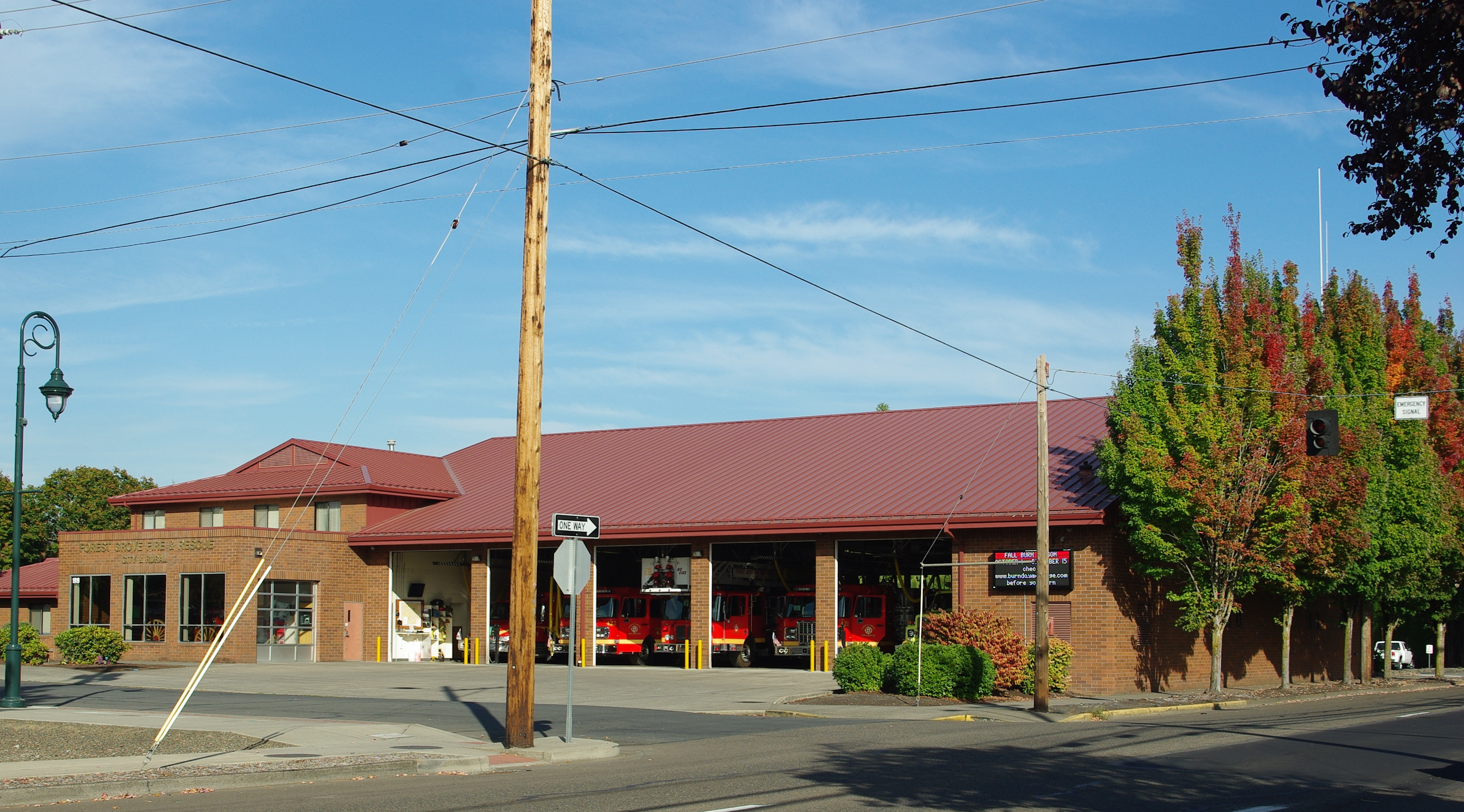
Main station on Ash Street

The department maintains two stations. The main station is located in downtown Forest Grove on Ash Street, which also houses the 1907 American LaFrance steamer. A second station is located in rural Gales Creek west of the city. The Gales Creek station, number 7, is staffed entirely by volunteers.

== Organization ==
Forest Grove Fire is led by Fire Chief Michael Kinkade. The service area for the rural district includes the communities of Gales Creek, Dilley, and Verboort. For 2013, the department had a total of 3,307 service calls, of which 2,297 were for emergency medical services and only 110 for fires. Of the 3,307 total calls, 2,794 were in the City of Forest Grove, while 408 were in the Rural Protection District.

== See also ==
- Firefighting in Oregon
