= Scroggins =

Scroggins may refer to:

- Scroggins (surname)
- Scroggins Aviation, an American aviation special effects company
- Scroggins, Texas, an unincorporated community in the United States
- USS Scroggins (DE-799), Buckley-class destroyer escort of the United States Navy.

== See also ==
- Scroggin, a type of snack mix
- Scoggins
- Scogin
