= Scroggins (surname) =

Scroggins is a surname. Notable people with the surname include:

- Deborah Scroggins (born 1961), American journalist and author
- Lee Scroggins (born 1981), English footballer
- Mike Scroggins (born 1964), American professional ten pin bowler
- Ted H. Scroggins (1918–1942), United States Navy sailor
- Tracy Scroggins (1969–2026), American football player

== See also ==
- Scoggins
- Scroggins (disambiguation)
