= Cook Park =

Cook Park may refer to:

- Cook Park, Orange, a park in New South Wales, Australia
- Cook Park, St Marys, a multi-use venue in New South Wales, Australia
- Rodney Cook Sr. Park, Atlanta, Georgia, U.S.
- Cook Park, Tigard, oldest park in Tigard, Oregon, U.S.

== See also ==
- Mount Cook National Park (disambiguation)
- Cook Park Library, a facility in the Cook Memorial Public Library District in Libertyville, Illinois, United States
