= Scoggins =

Scoggins is a surname, and may refer to:

- Carl Scoggins, American drummer
- Charles Elbert Scoggins (1888–1955), American writer
- Eric Scoggins (1959–2009), American football player
- Gustavus Scoggin, an American pioneer for whom Scoggins Creek and Scoggins Dam are named
- Jerry Scoggins (1913–2004), American country singer
- Jim Scoggins (1891–1923), American baseball player
- Justin Scoggins, American mixed martial arts fighter
- Mitchell Scoggins, American politician
- Myles W. Scoggins (21st century), 16th president of the Colorado School of Mines
- Ralph Scoggins, American politician
- Roy Scoggins, English cricketer
- Tracy Scoggins (born 1953), American actress

Scoggins may also refer to:

- Fictional village in Minnesota from Nelson Tethers: Puzzle Agent and Puzzle Agent 2.
- Scoggins Creek in Oregon, U.S.

== See also ==
- Scroggins (disambiguation)
