= West Union Baptist Church =

Historic church in Oregon, United States

- U.S. National Register of Historic Places
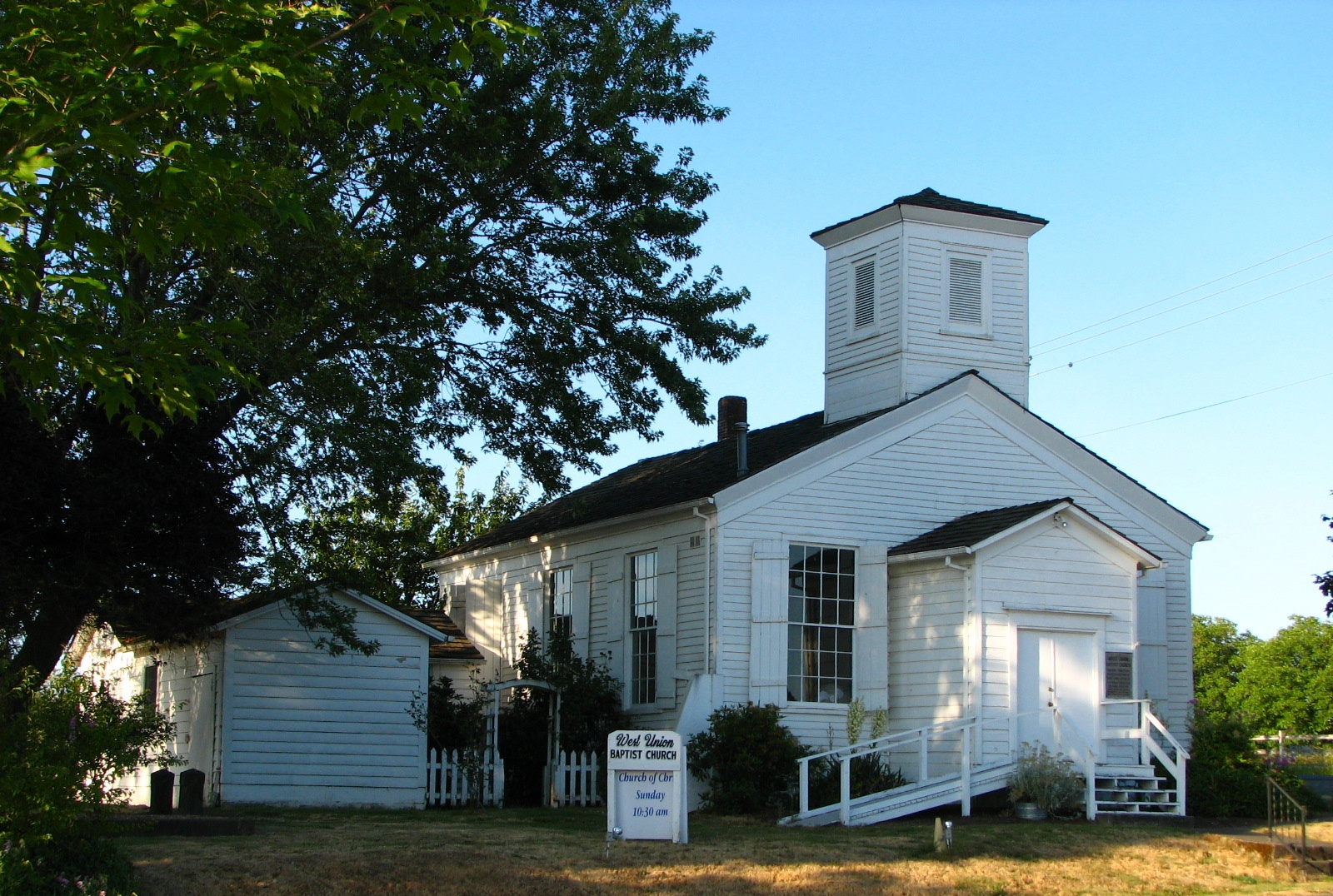
- Location: 22365 NW West Union Road; Hillsboro, Oregon
- Coordinates: 45°34′25.42″N 122°54′24.98″W
- Built: 1853
- Architect: William Kane
- Architectural style: Classical Revival
- NRHP reference No.: 74001725
- Added to NRHP: July 10, 1974

West Union Baptist Church is a Baptist congregation and historic church structure in West Union, Oregon, United States.

== History ==
The Baptist congregation was founded in 1844 and met in the home of pioneer David Thomas Lenox until 1853, when he donated 2 acres (8,100 m^{2}) of his land for a church and cemetery. The one-story, Classical Revival style building was built of hand-sawn lumber on what is now West Union Road for a little over $1,500. The 30- by 40-foot (12 m) structure has cedar rafters, fir joists and sills of hand-hewn fir logs. On December 25, 1853, the building was dedicated by the Reverend Ezra Fisher. It is the oldest Baptist society and the oldest Protestant church building still standing west of the Rocky Mountains. Pioneers Caleb Wilkens and George W. Ebbert are buried at the cemetery, which is the oldest cemetery in the state.

The church was listed on the National Register of Historic Places in 1974 and is currently maintained by the American Baptist Churches of Oregon. Previously the otherwise unused building was the site of an annual memorial meeting, but the church now holds regular Sunday services.

== See also ==
- Imbrie Farm
