= West Union, Oregon =

Unincorporated community in the state of Oregon, United States

- Unincorporated community
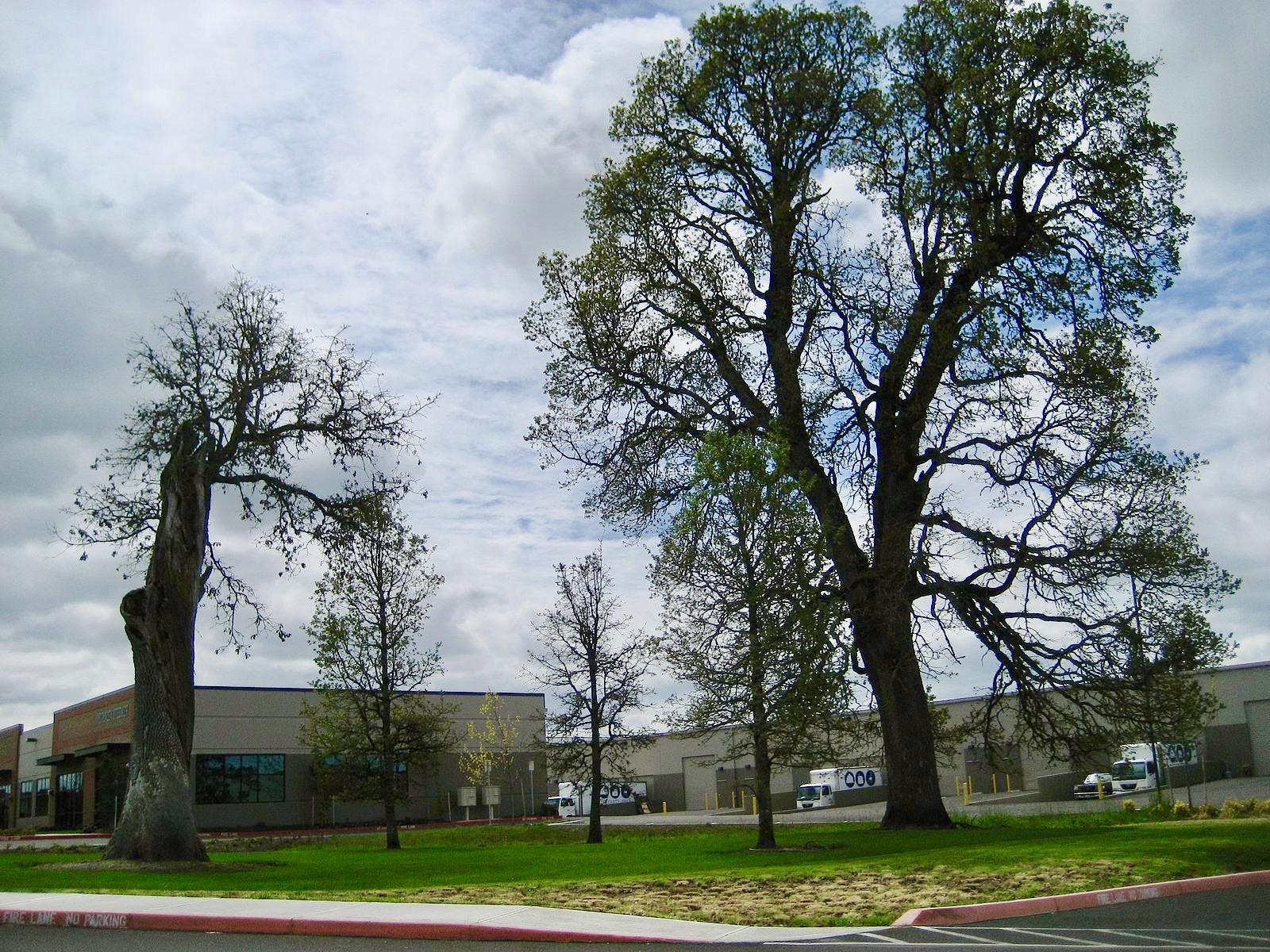
- The five oaks that gave West Union its name

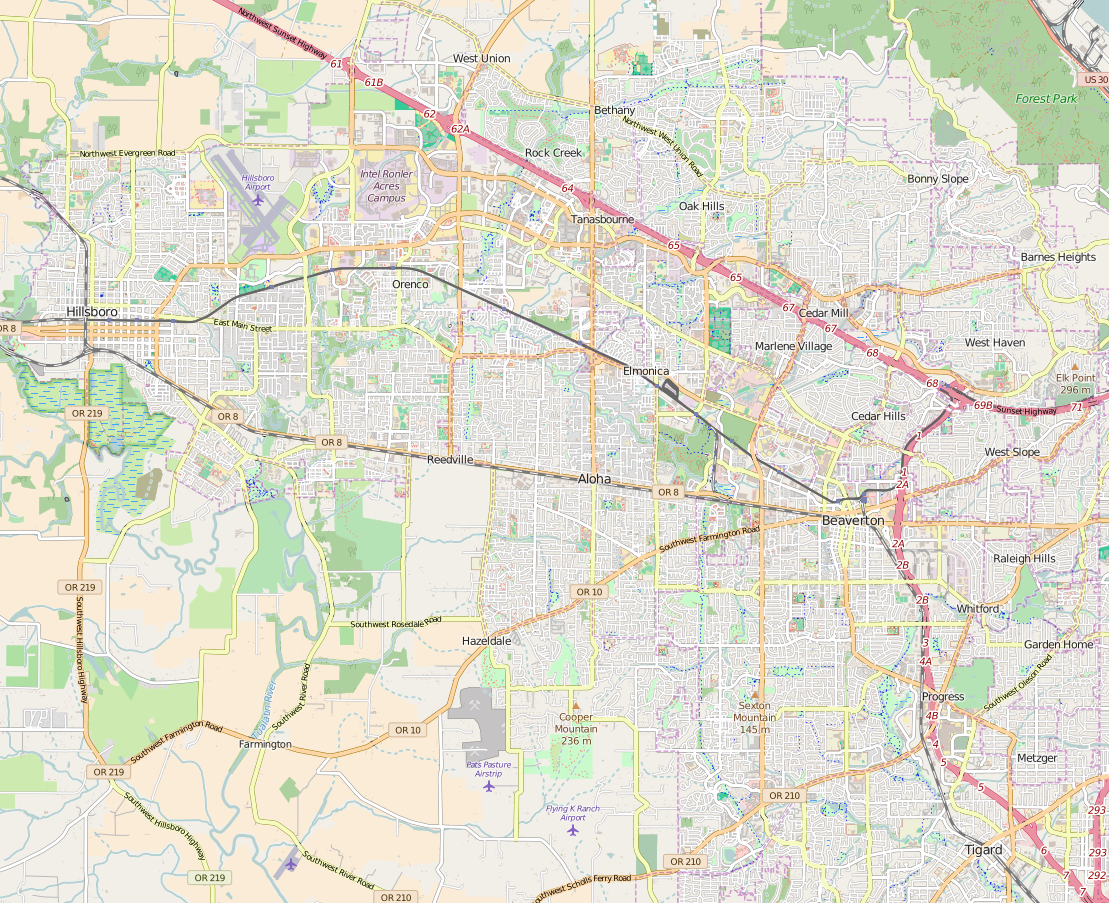
- Location within the Hillsboro area West Union, Oregon (Oregon) West Union, Oregon (the United States)
- Coordinates: 45°33′59″N 122°53′38″W
- Country: United States
- State: Oregon
- County: Washington
- Elevation: 249 ft (76 m)
- Time zone: UTC-8 (Pacific (PST))
  - Summer (DST): UTC-7 (PDT)
- ZIP codes: 97123
- Area codes: 503 and 971
- GNIS feature ID: 1163344

West Union is an unincorporated community in Washington County, Oregon, United States. Founded in 1851, the community had the first school district in the county; it also contains the oldest cemetery in the state and the oldest Baptist church west of the Rocky Mountains. It is located north of Hillsboro near the intersection of West Union Road and Cornelius Pass Road north of the Sunset Highway. The name comes from a grove of five oak trees that was used as a meeting place of early settlers, or the "union of the west." West Union had a post office from 1874 to 1894.

== Geography ==
As defined by the county, the community is located south of West Union Road and north of the Sunset Highway (U.S. Route 26). The eastern boundary is Cornelius Pass Road. West Union is situated on small hills and flat plains with Dawson Creek and Waible Gulch draining the area, both part of the drainage area of the Tualatin River. The community is located 249 feet (76 m) above sea level.

The general community of West Union encompasses a larger area that includes areas to the north and east of the county-defined community area. Since 1983, portions of the community planning area have been annexed into the city of Hillsboro. The population in 1983 was 35 people.

== Government ==
There is no community government for West Union. The community is served by Clean Water Services for municipal sewer, and fire protection is provided by Washington County Fire District 2. West Union lies within District 4 of the Washington County Board of Commissioners and is represented by Andy Duyck. Municipal water service is available from the Tualatin Valley Water District.

== School ==
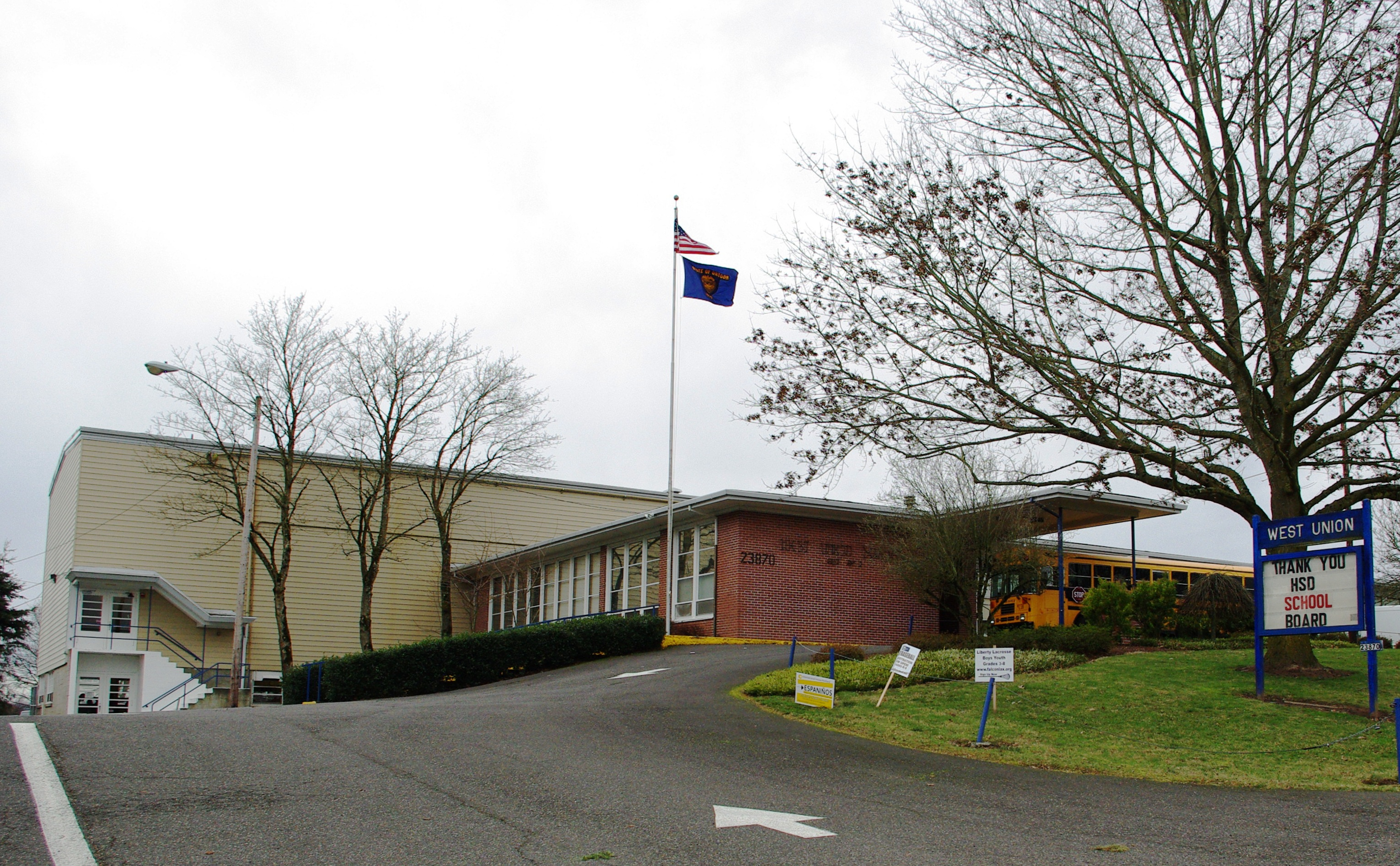
West Union Elementary School

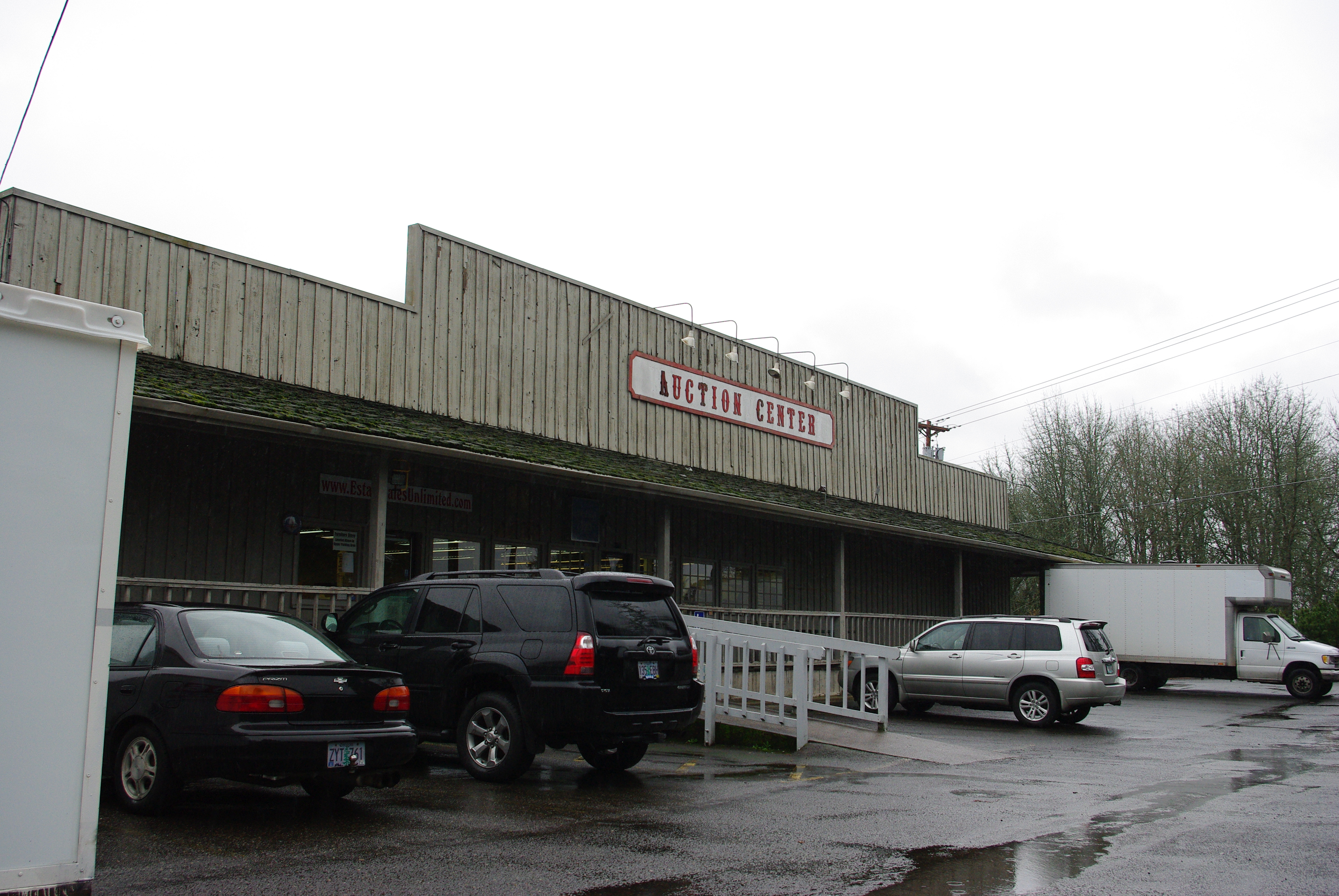
Former grocery store at West Union Road and Cornelius Pass Road

West Union started the first school district in Washington County. The first meeting of the school board was on November 12, 1851. School District No. 1 was directed by David Thomas Lenox, James W. Chamberlain, and Caleb Wilkens, and the school was built on the land claim of the Holcomb family. Classes began in October 1852 after a school was completed on May 17, 1852. Miss E. H. Lincoln was paid $100 for a 12-week term to be the first teacher at the school.

In 1892, the original school was replaced; this second building remained in use until 1949. The current school building opened in 1948. The school district was merged into the Hillsboro School District in 1996. Liberty High School was built in the area in 2003.

== Church ==
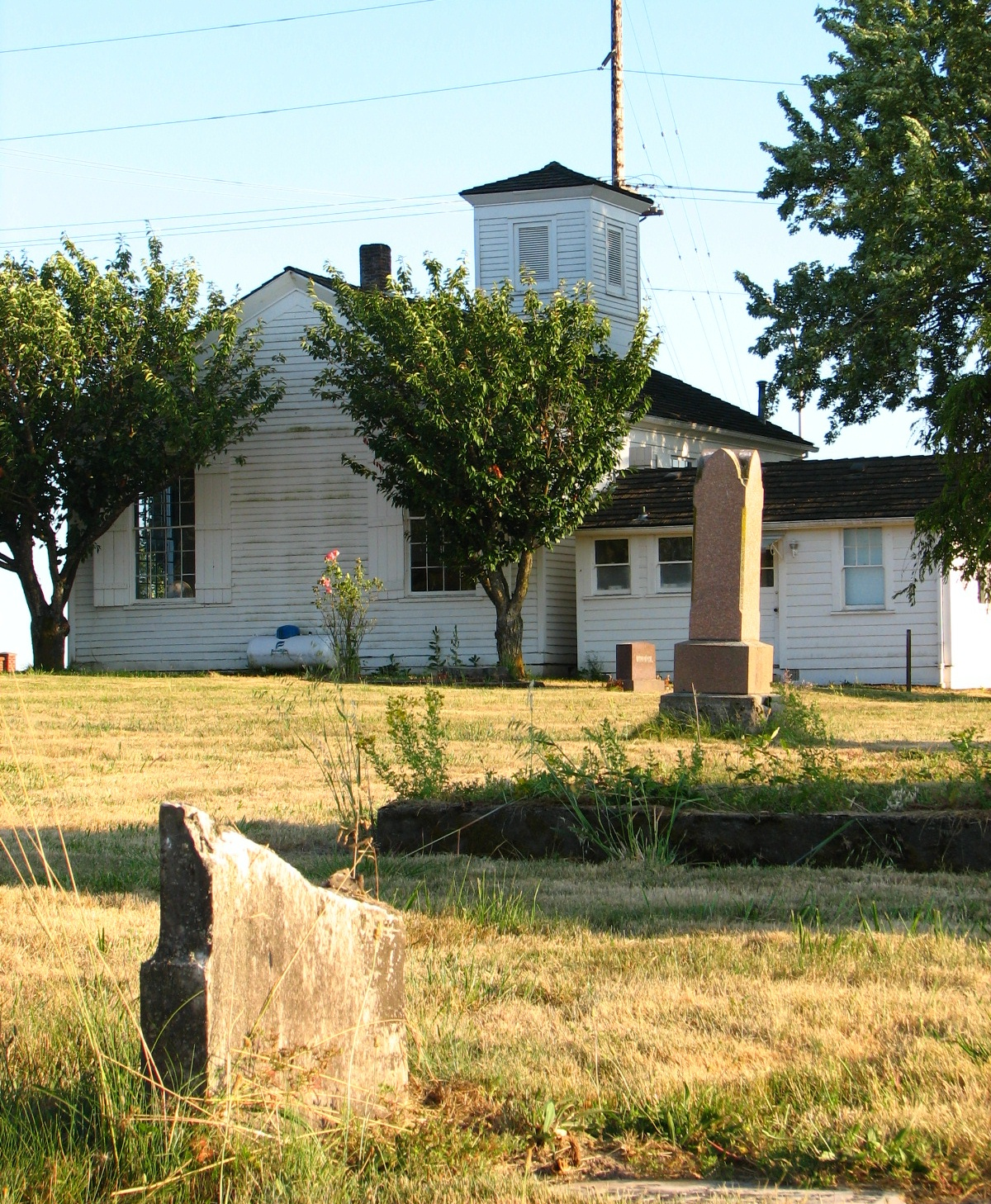
West Union Baptist Church and cemetery

West Union Baptist Church was founded in 1844 and the current building was completed in 1853, making it the oldest Baptist church west of the Rocky Mountains. The adjoining cemetery is the oldest in the state. The church was listed on the National Register of Historic Places in 1974.
