= Lee Falls =

Waterfall on the Tualatin River in Washington County, Oregon

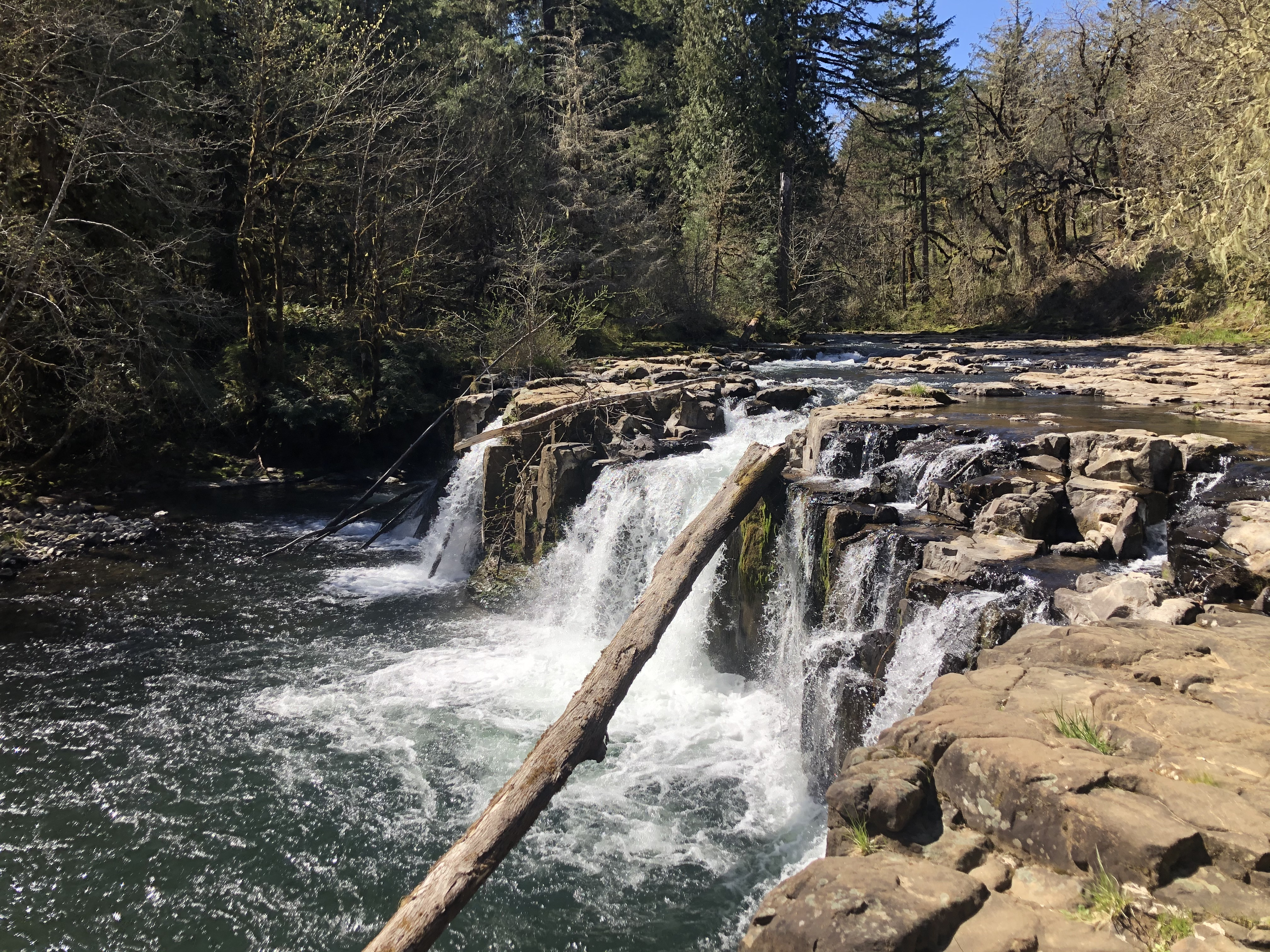
- Lee Falls in April 2021.
- Interactive map of Lee Falls
- Location: Washington County, Oregon, United States
- Coordinates: 45°27′55″N 123°17′05″W
- Type: Block
- Elevation: 395 ft (120 m)
- Watercourse: Tualatin River

Lee Falls is a waterfall on the Tualatin River in Washington County in the U.S. state of Oregon. Named after 19th century sawmill owner James A. Lee, it is located alongside Southwest Lee Falls Road on private timber land. The falls pour over a basalt rock formation. Unusually for the region, the falls are wider than they are tall. A swimming hole is present beneath the falls. Downstream are Little Lee Falls and the unincorporated community of Cherry Grove. Upstream is Ki-a-Kuts Falls.

== Gallery ==
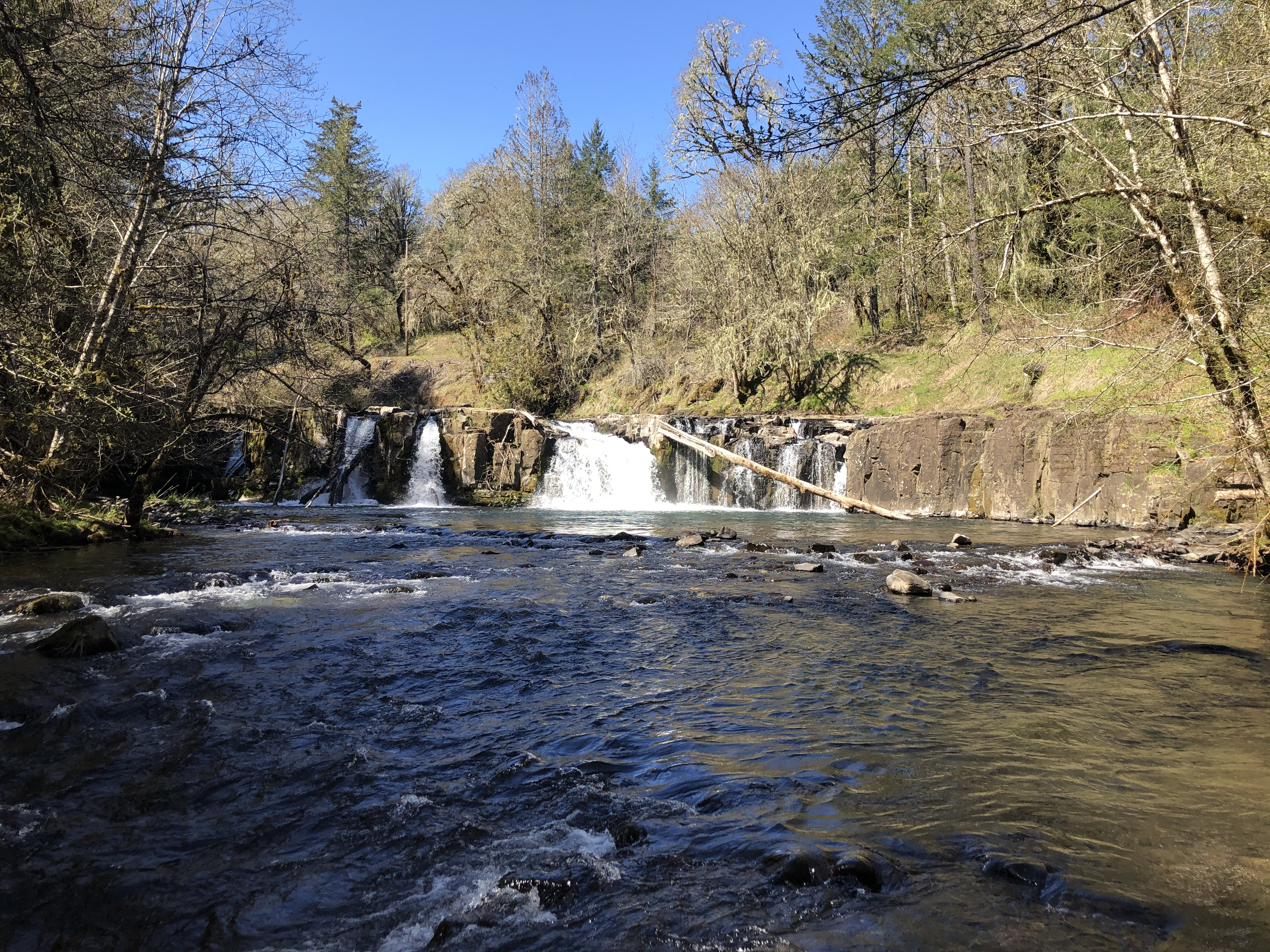
Looking upstream towards the falls

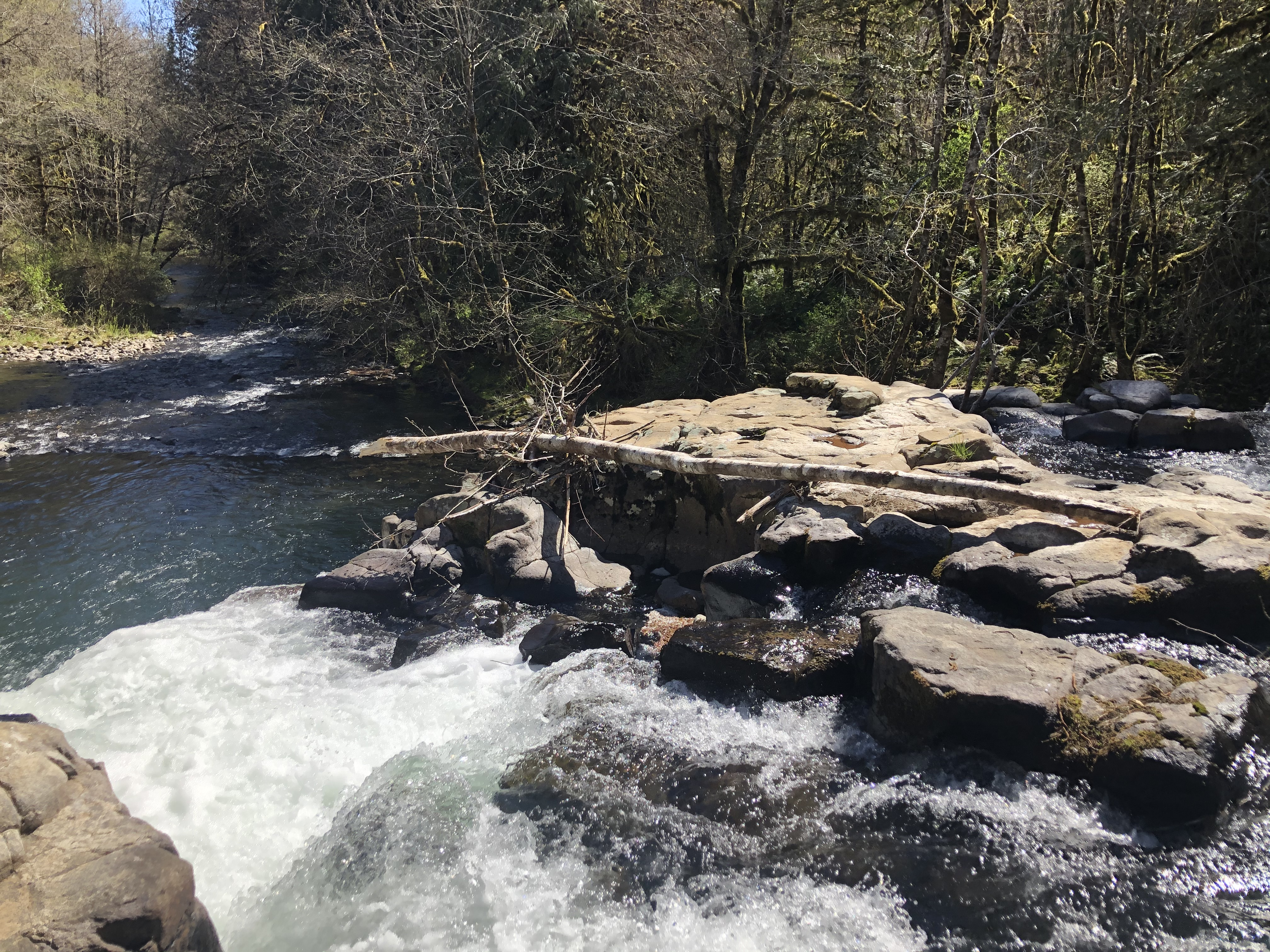
Above the falls

== See also ==
- List of waterfalls in Oregon
