= List of parks in Tigard, Oregon =

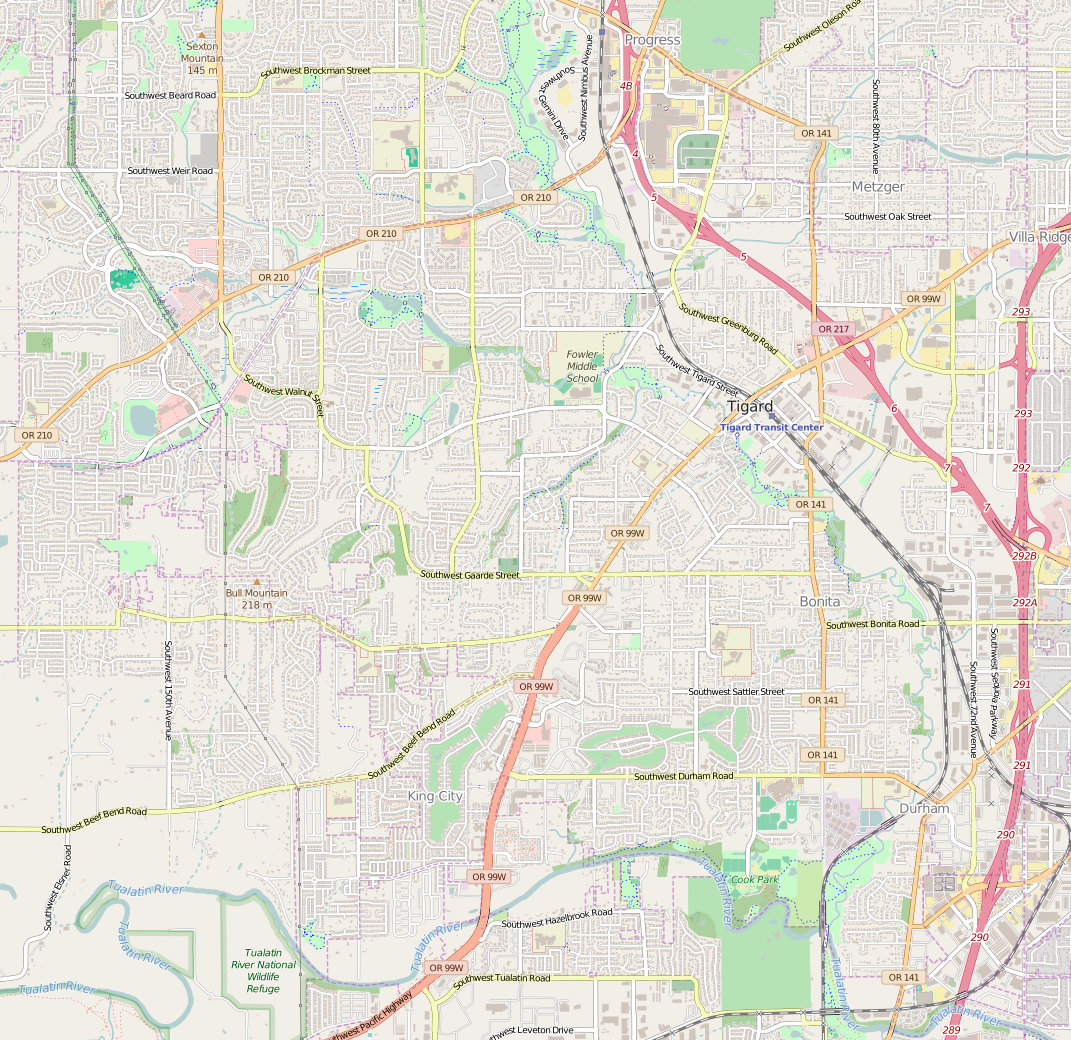
City of Tigard Parks. Green dots are developed sites while red dots are undeveloped sites.

This is a list of parks managed by the City of Tigard, in the U.S. state of Oregon.

The City of Tigard Public Works department (specifically the Parks & Recreation division) oversees developed 36 sites encompassing 550 acres.

== Sites ==
Name	Class	Acres	Website
Amelia Park	Neighborhood Park	0.94	Link
Ash Avenue Dog Park	Specialty Park	0.29	Link
Bear Park	Neighborhood Park	0.40	-
Blueberry Hill Park	Community Park	8.10	Link
Bonita Park	Neighborhood Park	5.57	Link
Bull Mountain Park	Neighborhood Park	10.00	Link
Commercial Park	Neighborhood Park	0.73	Link
Cook Family Park	Community Park	86.98	Link
Dirksen Nature Park	Community Park	48.79	Link
East Butte Heritage Park	Neighborhood Park	3.00	Link
Elizabeth Price Park	Neighborhood Park	2.54	Link
Englewood Park	Linear Park	17.76	Link
Fanno Creek House	Specialty Park	1.63	Link
Fanno Creek Park	Linear Park	30.60	Link
Greenfield Community Garden	Neighborhood Park	0.17	Link
Jack Park	Neighborhood Park	7.10	Link
Jim Griffith Memorial Skate Park	Specialty Park	0.45	Link
Liberty Park	Neighborhood Park	0.28	Link
Metzger Community Garden	Neighborhood Park	0.00	Link
Metzger School Park	Neighborhood Park	3.24	Link
Northview Park	Neighborhood Park	3.50	Link
Orchard Park	Neighborhood Park	1.95	Link
Potso Dog Park	Specialty Park	2.59	Link
River Terrace Crossing Park	Neighborhood Park	2.17	Link
Roshak Park	Neighborhood Park	1.43	Link
Rotary Plaza	Specialty Park	0.20	Link
Sabrina Park	Neighborhood Park	1.36	Link
Senn Park	Specialty Park	0.25	Link
South River Terrace Park	Neighborhood Park	2.42	-
Summerlake Park	Community Park	30.26	Link
Sunrise Park	Neighborhood Park	25.47	Link
Tigard Street Trail	Linear Park	4.67	Link
TriMet Trail	Linear Park	0.98	-
Universal Plaza	Specialty Park	1.18	Link
Windmill Park	Specialty Park	0.13	Link
Woodard Park	Neighborhood Park	19.26	Link

== Undeveloped Sites ==
The City of Tigard also manages four undeveloped park sites:

Name	Class	Acres	Website
Bagan Park	Undeveloped	8.25	Link
Cach Nature Park	Undeveloped	16.00	Link
Cinema Redevelopment Site	Undeveloped	9.25	Link
Steve Street Future Park Site	Undeveloped	28.40	Link
