= Blooming, Oregon =

Unincorporated community in the state of Oregon, United States

Coordinates: 45.487338°N 123.051217°W

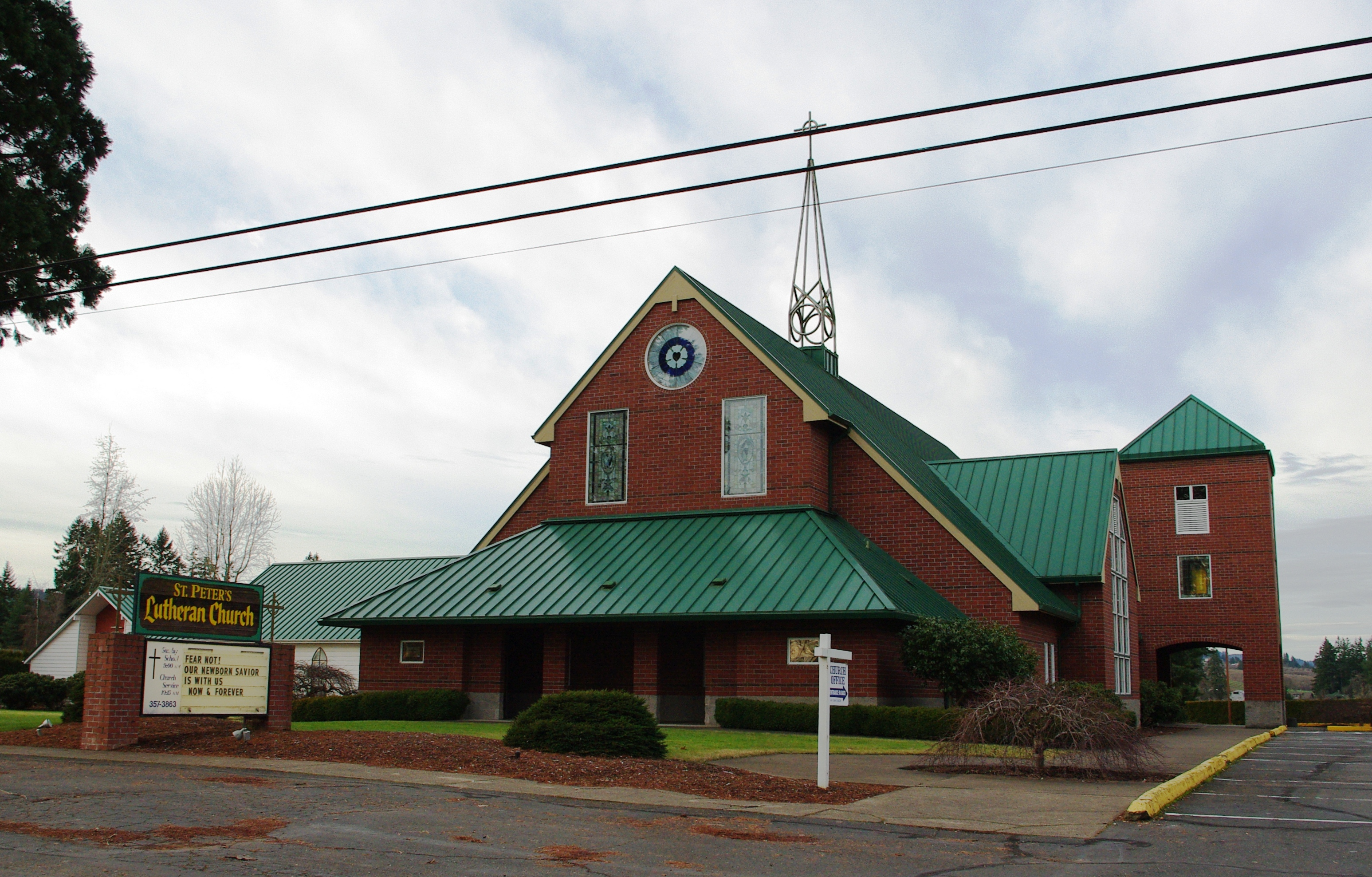
St. Peter's Lutheran Church

Blooming is an unincorporated community in Washington County, Oregon, United States near the Tualatin River, about two miles south of Cornelius. Its elevation is 190 feet (58 m). There are several plant nurseries in the area.

The Blooming area was originally known as "the German Settlement" for a group of German immigrants who had settled there. Rev. Paul of St. Peter's Lutheran Church renamed the community "Blooming", for the area's flowers and as an indicator of the town's good prospects. Blooming post office ran from 1895 to 1904.

The center of the community was St. Peter's Evangelical Lutheran Church, which is the second-oldest congregation of the Lutheran Church–Missouri Synod in the Pacific Northwest. The church was founded and the original church building constructed in 1882; a portion of the current church was built in 1923.

Blooming has a Cornelius ZIP code.
