= Ki-a-Kuts Falls =

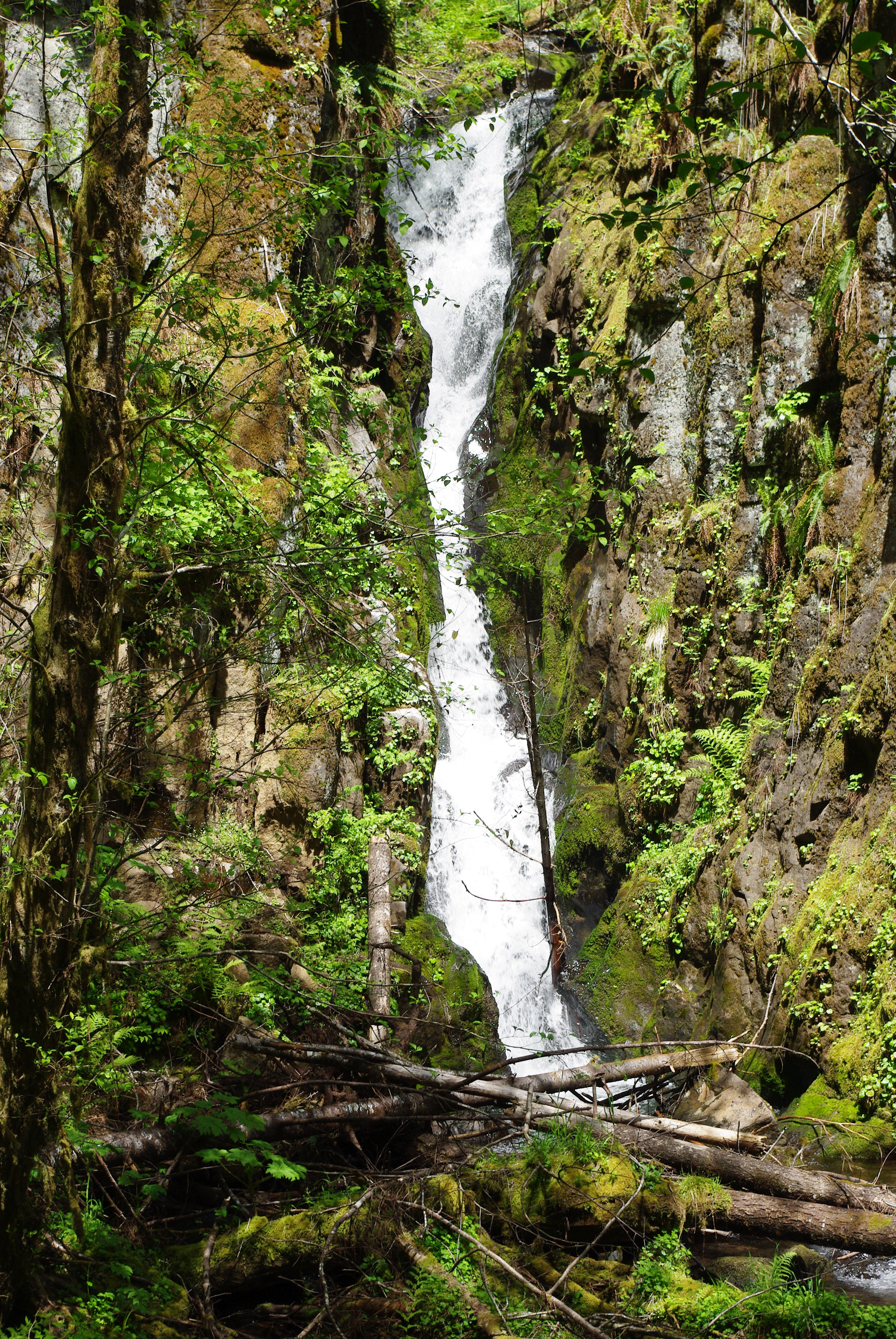
- Ki-a-Kuts Falls in late spring
- Interactive map of Ki-a-Kuts Falls
- Location: Washington County, Oregon, United States
- Coordinates: 45.4665°N 123.387890°W
- Type: Cascade
- Elevation: 1,299 ft (396 m)
- Total height: 40 ft (12 m)
- Number of drops: 1
- Watercourse: Tualatin River

Ki-a-Kuts Falls is a 40-foot (12 m) tall waterfall on the Tualatin River in Washington County, Oregon, United States. Discovered in 1993 in the more remote upper stretch of the river, the falls were named after the last chief of the local band of Native Americans, Chief Ki-a-Kuts of the Atfalati. The water descends in a single fall down a narrow channel in the basalt cliffs overhanging the river at that spot.

== History ==
In July 1993, a group of eight hikers from the Tualatin Riverkeepers group were exploring the upper reaches of the Tualatin River, the only river in Washington County. During that hike the group stumbled upon the then uncharted falls while hiking in the river approximately 1.5 miles (2.4 km) directly north of Barney Reservoir. After returning home, the group worked to have the waterfall added to maps and to be officially named by the United States Board on Geographic Names and the state level names board. Early options included Lost Falls and Riverkeepers Falls before the group decided to honor the former inhabitants of the Tualatin Valley. The state naming board accepted the name on June 10, 1999.

On June 21, 1999, the cascade was dedicated as Ki-A-Kuts Falls in a ceremony featuring officials from the Confederated Tribes of the Grand Ronde. The falls were named after the final chief of the Atfalati band of the Native Americans that were part of the Kalapuya language group. The Atfalati inhabited the Tualatin Valley prior to the arrival of Euro-American settlers and were devastated by diseases from the Columbian Exchange in the early 19th century. The survivors of the epidemics were forced off their ancestral lands and relocated to the Grand Ronde Indian Reservation in what is now Polk County along with several other bands of Native Americans.

== Details ==
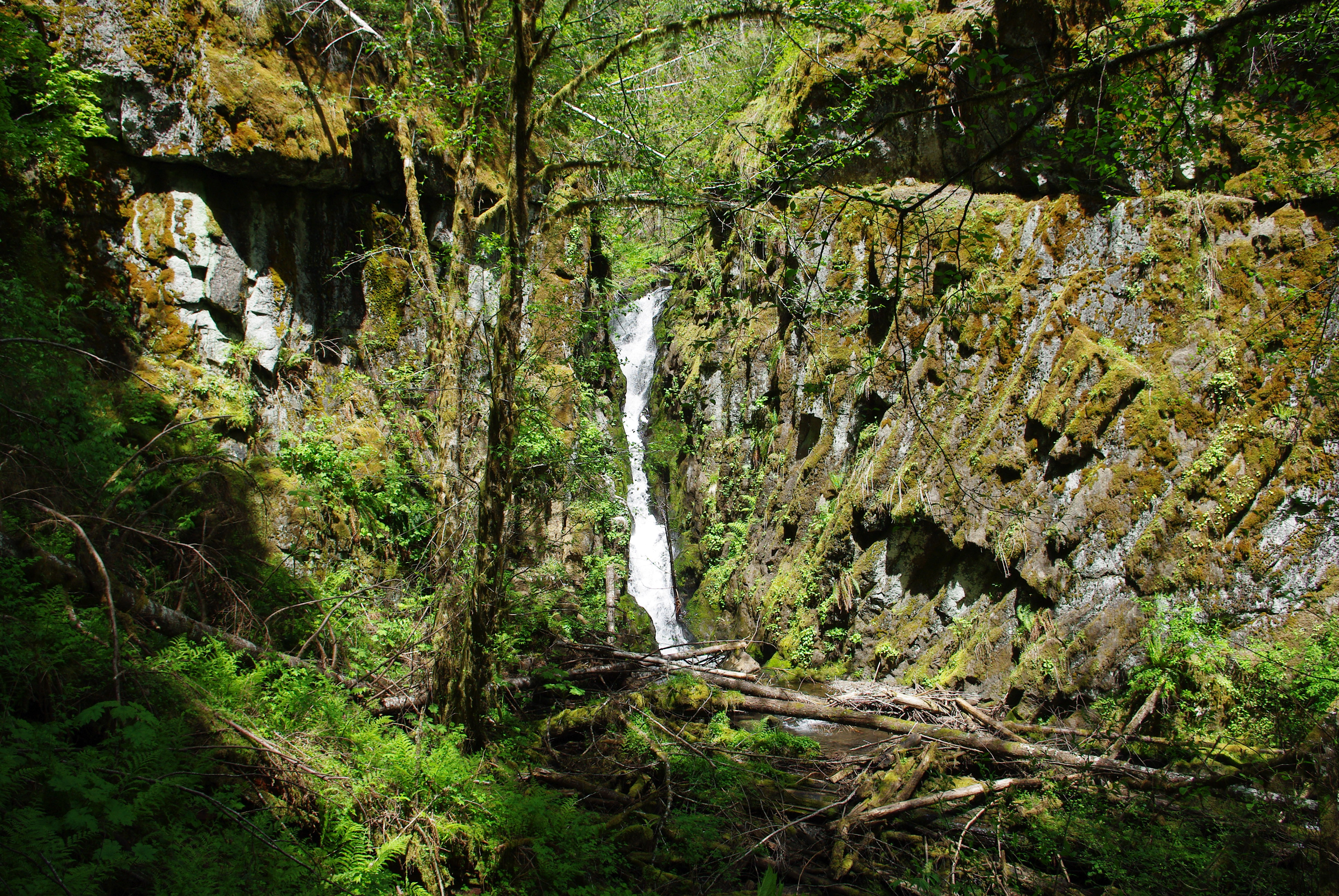
Wide view of the falls

Ki-a-Kuts Falls stands 40 feet (12 m) tall and travels down a narrow rock chute in a single cascade over basalt cliffs. They end in a pool of water at the base, with views obscured by trees. Views are further obscured by a bend in the river at that point, which helped keep the falls concealed behind cliffs and thus unnoticed by modern explorers and off of maps. The falls are located 1,700 feet (520 m) upriver (west) of the Tualatin River’s confluence with Maple Creek and 1.4 miles (2.3 km) north of Barney Reservoir at an elevation of 1,299 feet (396 m). This is west of Henry Hagg Lake and the city of Gaston and about 3.5 miles (5.6 km) east of the county line with Tillamook County within the Tillamook State Forest.

Most place names with hyphens are rejected by the Board of Geographic Names, but the board made an exception due to the request to honor the Native American chief. Additionally, the Confederated Tribes of the Grand Ronde requested the last word be spelled with a K instead of a C as originally proposed.
