= Oregon City College =

School in Oregon, USA

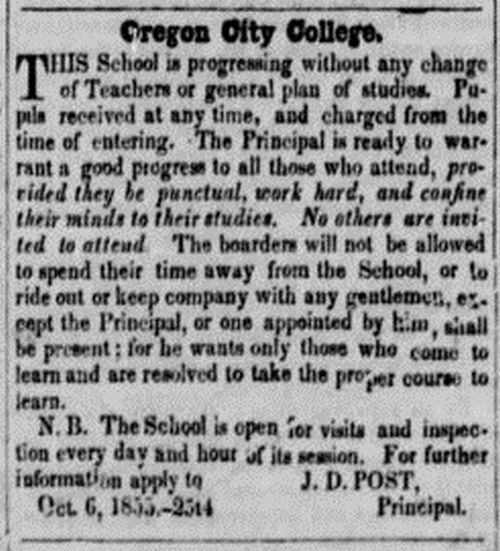
- College advertisement in the Oregon Argus
- Type: Private
- Active: 1849–1858
- Affiliations: Baptist
- Location: Oregon City, Oregon, United States; 45.359242°N 122.600451°W
- Fate: Assets from the school were given to McMinnville College (now Linfield College)

Oregon City College was a short-lived school in what is today the U.S. state of Oregon. Organized by the Baptist Church in 1849, it was located in Oregon City and is partly a predecessor to Linfield College.

== History ==
On September 21, 1849, the Oregon Baptist Educational Society was started in what was then the Oregon Territory. On September 27, 1849, a meeting of the group was held and they decided to build a school on the east bank of the Willamette River, approximately eight miles north of its confluence with the Calapooia River, and established a board of trustees. The Rev. Ezra Fisher was asked to start the school, but when he went to the planned site it was not available and instead he started to teach school inside the Oregon City Baptist Church while leaders contemplated what to do for a permanent site. Meanwhile, the Rev. Richmond Cheadle was tasked with raising $2,000 to pay for construction of a school building.

The society then met again on February 8, 1850, and Oregon City was selected as the permanent home for the school, which had grown to about 50 students. At the meeting the society also hired Cheadle to raise $4,000 for the school building and decided to request textbooks and a bell from the Baptist Home Missionary Society. On February 15, 1850, the school was named as Oregon City College. Soon after, Hezekiah Johnson, Ezra Fisher, and Joseph Jeffers purchased a 51-acre (21 ha) property and donated it to the school, while Dr. John McLoughlin donated a single lot in Oregon City. The trustees decided to build the first building on the town lot, with plans calling for a two-story structure measuring 22 feet (6.7 m) by 42 feet (13 m).

When school resumed in September 1850, the building was still under construction. The California Gold Rush and the Donation Land Claim Act led to a decline in students, with enrollment dropping to around 50 in February 1851. That fall, women were no longer allowed to attend, and George Chandler and James Read took over as teachers from Rev. Fisher. Due in part to low enrollment, both teachers left the following year and eventually Erasmus D. Shattuck became the teacher until a Baptist from the east could arrive, who was Rev. J.D. Post who started in early 1854. Meanwhile, the building was finished in 1852. After disagreements with the board of trustees, Post left the next year.

The school had never sought a charter from the legislature, but in January 1856, the Willamette Baptist Association organized Oregon City University and obtained a charter from the Oregon Territorial Legislature that transferred all assets of the former school to the new school. However, classes were held intermittently, and in 1858 the school closed.

== Legacy ==
After the school closed, the building slipped into disrepair and was taken over by vandals. In 1874, the building was torn down. The board of trustees for the college last met on June 16, 1888, in which it donated the school bell and two books to McMinnville College, now Linfield College, along with the proceeds of the sale of the school's property. Linfield considers Oregon City College as its forerunner Baptist institution.
