= George W. Ebbert =

American mountain man (1810–1890)

George Wood Ebbert

Participant at the Champoeg Meetings
- In office 1843–1843
- Constituency: Tualatin Plains

Constable in the Provisional Government of Oregon
- In office 1843–1844
- Preceded by: position created

Personal details
- Born: June 10, 1810 Augusta, Kentucky
- Died: October 1, 1890 (aged 80) Hillsboro, Oregon
- Spouse: Fanny Ebbert

George Wood "Squire" Ebbert (June 10, 1810 – October 1, 1890) was a mountain man and early settler in the Oregon Country. Born in Kentucky, he settled on the Tualatin Plains in what became Oregon and participated in the Champoeg Meetings that created a government prior to the formation of the Oregon Territory. During the Cayuse War he traveled with Joseph Meek across the Rocky Mountains to ask Congress for assistance with the war.

== Early life ==
Ebbert was born on June 10, 1810, in Augusta, Kentucky. His father died while Ebbert was still a boy, but left his mother well off financially. At age eight, he shot and killed a cow that had rampaged through the family home, earning him the nickname Squire. At age thirteen Ebbert became an apprentice machinist, but left with only three months to go of the seven-year apprenticeship to elope to St. Louis, Missouri with a woman against his mother's wishes. Ebbert's mother refused to attend their wedding, so he abandoned the plans and joined Milton Sublette as a fur trapper with the Rocky Mountain Fur Company. Later as a contract fur trapper, he worked for the Hudson's Bay Company between 1833 and 1836, arriving in the Oregon Country in 1833. Following work for that fur trading company, he worked as a blacksmith at the Whitman Mission and the mission of Henry H. Spalding at Lapwai from 1837 to 1838.

In 1839, Ebbert moved to the Willamette Valley and became the first white settler at Champoeg. After a short time farming there, he sold his land on the French Prairie in 1841 to Andre Longtain for 100 bushels of wheat. In 1841, Ebbert arrived on the Tualatin Plains in the Tualatin Valley north of Champoeg to settle. There he met with other early settlers of the Plains such as Joseph Gale, Robert Newell, and Joseph L. Meek among others.

== Political career ==
On May 2, 1843, at the Champoeg Meetings pioneer settlers voted to create a government, with Ebbert voting for the creation in a vote that passed 52 to 50. After the vote to create the Provisional Government of Oregon, Ebbert was elected as one of the constables for the government. His neighbor Joe Meek was elected as sheriff.

Following the Whitman Massacre in late 1847, the Provisional Legislature of Oregon authorized Joe Meek to travel east to Washington, DC, to ask for the creation of a federal territory with the start of the Cayuse War. On March 4, 1848, Meek set off with Ebbert accompanying him on the journey. The two arrived in St. Louis, Missouri, on May 4 with Meek representing himself as an envoy from the Republic of Oregon. Ebbert was never reimbursed for the expenses incurred on the trip.

== Later life ==
After returning from the nation's capitol, he settled on his farm with his wife Fanny. She was the sister of Meek's Native American wife Virginia, and George and Fanny had three children. Ebbert was one of the first purchasers of town lots in Hillsboro, Oregon, along with Ralph Wilcox, David T. Lenox, Alvin T. Smith, and others in the early 1850s. His land claim in Washington County was adjacent to what became the town of Orenco, Oregon, and is the site of much of the Orenco Station development in Hillsboro. George Ebbert died on October 1, 1890, and was buried at the West Union Baptist Church Cemetery in West Union, Oregon. The Washington County Museum has a George Ebbert Society.
