= David Thomas Lenox =

American judge

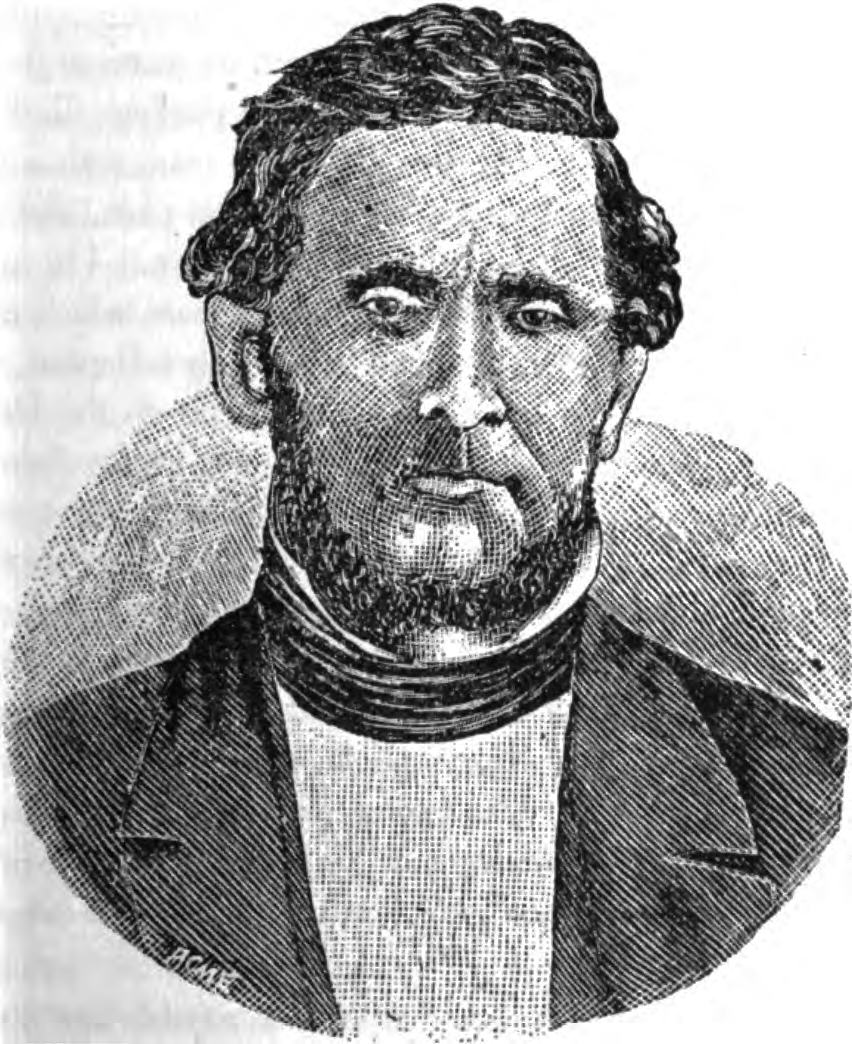

Probate Judge of Washington County
- In office 1850–1852

Personal details
- Born: December 8, 1802 Catskill, New York, U.S.
- Died: October 18, 1874 (aged 71) Weston, Oregon, U.S.
- Resting place: West Union Baptist Church Cemetery; 45.573737°N 122.90733°W
- Spouse: Louisa Swan

David Thomas Lenox (December 8, 1802 – October 18, 1874) was an American pioneer who settled in the Oregon Country where he organized the first Baptist Church west of the Rocky Mountains. A native of New York, he lived in Illinois and Missouri before he was captain of the first wagon train over the Oregon Trail to what became the state of Oregon. He also organized several schools and churches, and served as a judge and justice of the peace. In Oregon, he settled on the Tualatin Plains near what is now Hillsboro and later lived in Eastern Oregon.

== Early life ==
David Lenox was born in Catskill, New York, on December 8, 1802. His parents were English of the Scotch Methodist faith. He became an orphan at an early age, and had a limited education in the local schools. At 18 he left New York for Lexington, Kentucky, where he worked on a plantation. There he married the plantation owner’s daughter, Louisa Swan, in 1826. The couple had ten children.

The Lenox family moved to a farm at Rushville, Illinois, in 1829. There David Lenox farmed and served as a school teacher. He also converted to the Baptist sect in Rushville in 1832. In 1840, Lenox sold the farm and moved to Todds Creek in Platte County, where he bought timberland for $5 per acre. In Missouri he served as the clerk at his local church. After a couple years they decided their land would not be productive enough to sustain the family, and they resolved to immigrate to the Oregon Country.

== Oregon Trail ==
About 1843 Lenox was working as a contractor in Missouri (now Kansas) near Fort Leavenworth when he heard a speech about Oregon from Peter Hardeman Burnett. Lenox was already waiting to start for the Willamette Valley, but after the speech he signed up to travel with Burnett to Oregon. They formed a wagon train for the journey and hired a Mr. Gantt to lead the group to Fort Hall. On April 9, the party departed Platte City, Missouri on what was the first wagon train to cross the Oregon Trail all the way to Oregon. Burnett was selected as the captain of the wagon train at the beginning, but after one day he resigned and Lenox was elected as the new captain. After complaints that those traveling with livestock would slow down the entire group, the wagon train was split into two groups. The light column without the cattle was led by Lenox, and the cow column was captained by Jesse Applegate.

Despite Gannt being hired as the pilot, the Rev. Marcus Whitman arrived on May 15 at Westport, Missouri. Whitman arrived after his winter trip from his mission in the Oregon Country to Washington, D.C., and joined the group after they had started out. He was then hired to guide them all the way to the Columbia River, which was in addition to Gannt’s guide services. Asa Lovejoy also joined the group after he had returned east from Oregon with Whitman.

During the trip Lenox and Whitman insisted the wagon train not proceed on Sundays due to their religious beliefs. On August 29, Whitman left the group after Fort Hall to return to his mission after word had reached him of trouble with the natives, but promised to send back a Cayuse chief to guide them across the Blue Mountains and on to the Columbia. Whitman arrived at the Snake River and waited for the wagon train to catch up after surmising the crossing was more difficult than anticipated. After the crossing Whitman again left, and a Native American guide sent by Whitman arrived when the wagon train was at the Grande Ronde Mountains, and led them to the Whitman Mission. After one day at the mission, the group headed for the Columbia River without Whitman. At The Dalles the wagon train took rafts down the Columbia River to Fort Vancouver opposite the mouth of the Willamette River. Lenox arrived in Oregon City on the Willamette on November 26.

== Oregon ==
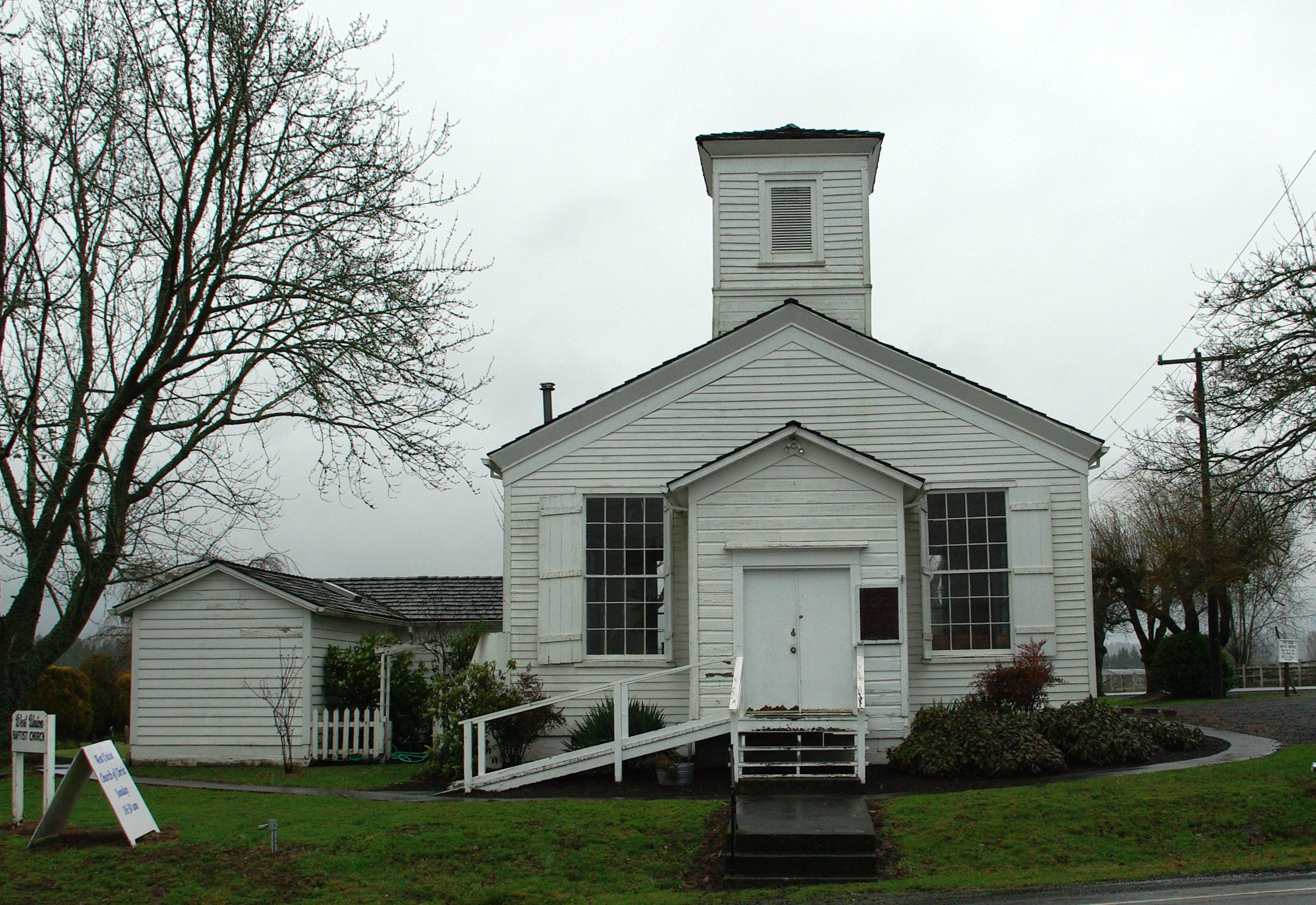
The West Union Baptist Church Lenox founded

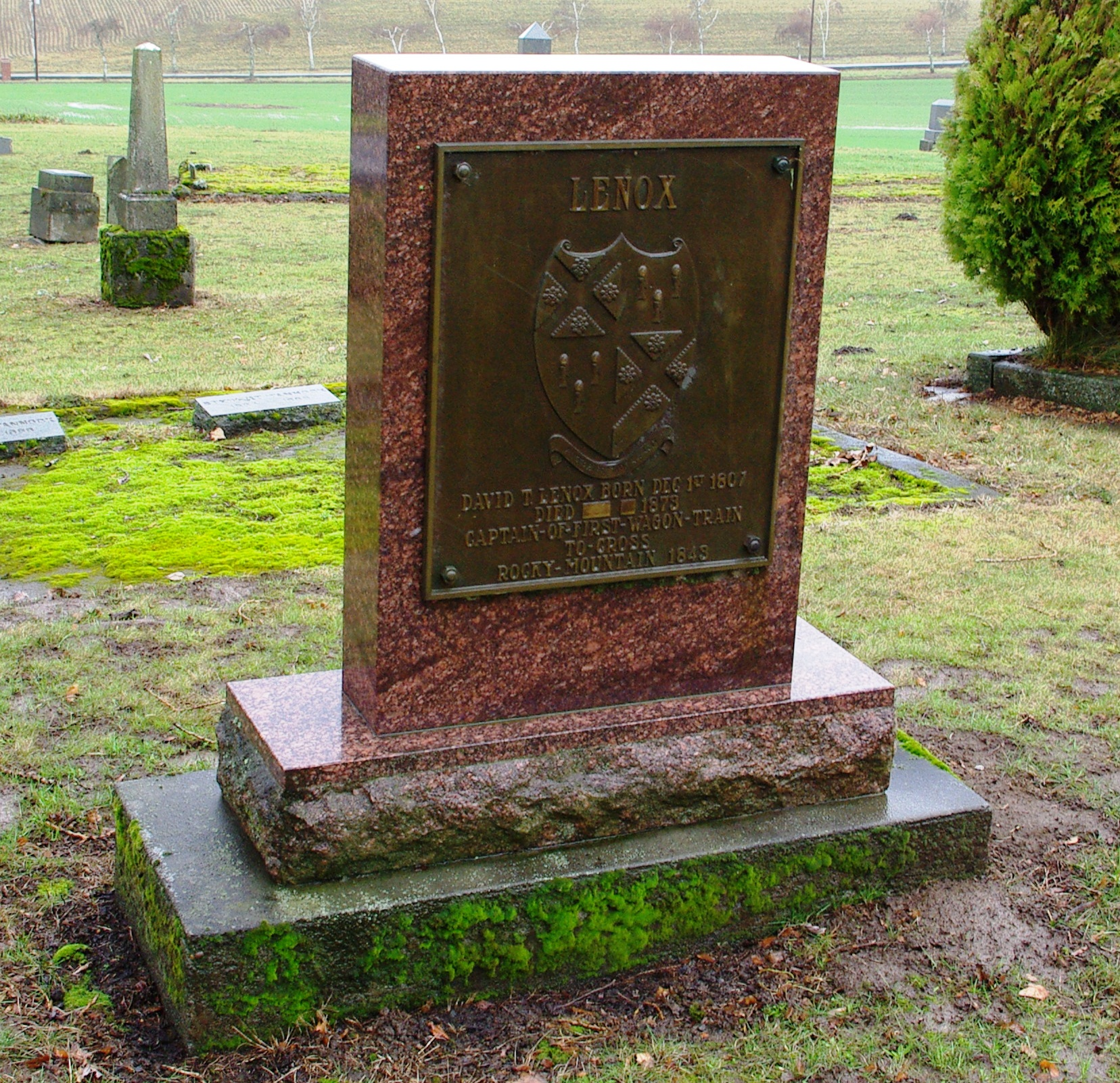
Plaque dedicated to Lenox at his gravesite

He settled first in 1844 on a land claim that he purchased near what is now Hillsboro, Oregon, in the community of West Union on the east Tualatin Plains, with that farm later known as the Joe Mecke farm. After a brief residence, he settled a 320-acre (130 ha) donation land claim nearby and farmed the land. Lenox brought the first corn to the Willamette Valley.

On May 25, 1844, he organized the West Union Baptist Church in his home, the first Baptist congregation west of the Rocky Mountains. Lenox donated the land for both the church and adjoining cemetery. The church is located where his original cabin was located. Lenox was selected as deacon of the congregation. Two of his daughters became the first Baptists baptized in Oregon when baptized in 1845.

In 1845, the Rev. Ezra Fisher and his family arrived at the Lenox home and spent the winter with the Lenoxes. That winter the cabin held the thirteen members of the Lenox clan, six members of the Fisher family, and a widow and her three children. The cabin measured 18 feet by 22 feet, and Lenox left the cabin in the spring for a new cabin, with the Fisher family remaining on the old cabin.

In 1847, Lenox helped to establish the Baptist Church in Oregon City. He helped establish the first Baptist Association on the west coast in 1848, and served as the clerk of that body. After farming at first, Lenox later ran a mercantile. On November 12, 1851, he helped found the West Union School District, the first in the county. He served on the first board of directors of the district along with Caleb Wilkins and James W. Chambers. Along with George W. Ebbert and Ralph Wilcox and several others, he was one of the first people to buy a lot in 1852 in what became the city of Hillsboro. In 1857, he and several others formed the West Union Institute to serve as a Baptist school. The school never held classes, and instead was transferred to a school in McMinnville run by Sebastian C. Adams and became the forerunner of Linfield College.

== Political career ==
In the June 3, 1845, elections for the provisional government, Lenox was a candidate to represent Tuality District in the legislature. He finished sixth in the voting, with David Hill, Morton M. McCarver, and J. W. Smith elected to the House of Representatives instead of Lenox. From 1847 to 1848 he was a justice of the peace in that district, and was a candidate to be a probate judge there in 1850. A Democrat, he served in that position, the only judge in what had become Washington County.

== Later life ==
Lenox moved to the Eastern Oregon city of Weston in 1870 where he purchased a farm. David Thomas Lenox died on October 18, 1874, near Weston at the age of 71. After his death he was buried on the farm, with the location of the gravesite at the Kees (or Blue Mountain) Cemetery later lost, but then rediscovered in 1924. In 1924, the Baptists of Oregon dedicated a monument in his honor at his gravesite. This group then moved his remains and their plaque in 1960 to the West Union Baptist Church Cemetery where his wife was buried.
