= South Saddle Mountain =

Mountain in Washington County, Oregon, United States

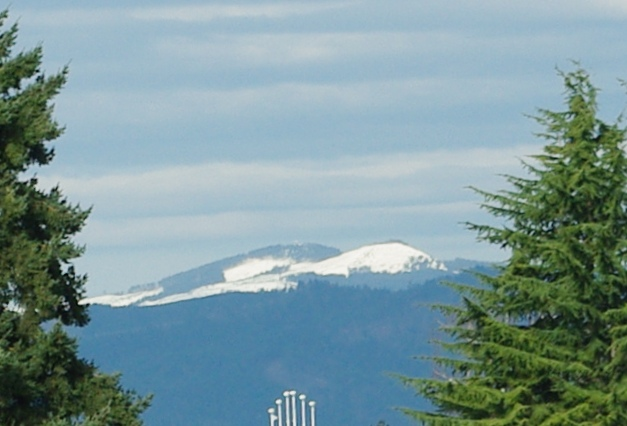
- The tops of the two peaks of the mountain.

Highest point
- Elevation: 3,465 ft (1,056 m) NAVD 88
- Prominence: 664 ft (202 m)
- Coordinates: 45°32′53″N 123°22′30″W

Geography
- Location within Oregon
- Location: Washington County, Oregon, U.S.
- Parent range: Northern Oregon Coast Range
- Topo map: USGS Roaring Creek

South Saddle Mountain is the tallest mountain in Washington County, Oregon, United States. Part of the Oregon Coast Range, the peak is located in the Tillamook State Forest in the northwest section of the state of Oregon. It is the eighth-highest peak of the Oregon Coast Range.

== History ==
South Saddle Mountain is one of 17 peaks in Oregon with the name Saddle. South Saddle was originally known as simply Saddle Mountain but in 1983 officially became South Saddle Mountain to avoid confusion with Saddle Mountain 33 miles (53 km) to the north in Clatsop County.

== Geology ==
Origins of the mountain begin around 40 million years ago during the Eocene epoch, when sandstone and siltstone formed in the region consisting of parts of the Northern Oregon Coast Range. Igneous rocks and basalt flows combined with basaltic sandstone to create much of the formations. Other sedimentary rock in the area formed more recently, around 20 million years ago. It is hypothesized that the region was an island during the Eocene.

== Area and access ==
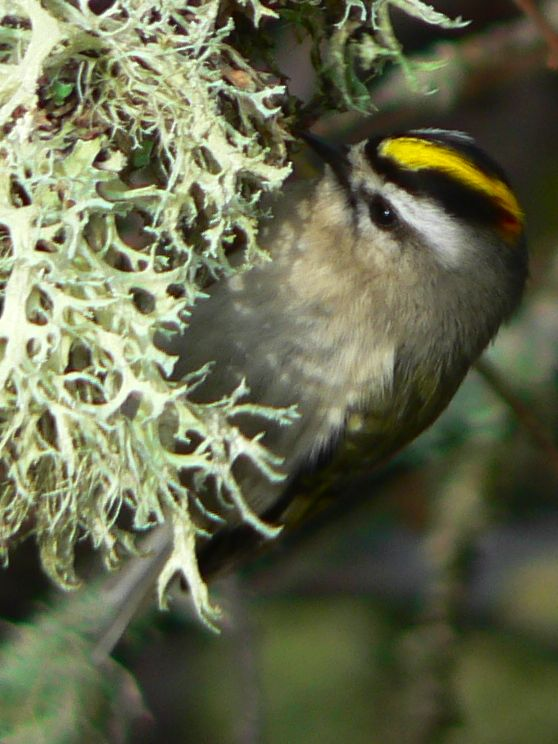
A golden-crowned kinglet.

The lower peak houses a microwave transmission tower, while the lower parts of the mountain are popular for bird watchers and off-road motorcycle enthusiasts. This 110-foot-tall (34 m) tower includes amateur radio repeaters and an AT&T microwave transmitter. Surrounding the mountain are forests of western hemlock and Douglas fir trees. Fauna in the area include a variety of birds such as hermit warbler, sooty grouse, chestnut-backed chickadee, golden-crowned kinglet, Steller's jay, and Pacific-slope flycatcher.

South Saddle Mountain is approximately 7 miles (11 km) due northwest of Henry Hagg Lake and due west of Forest Grove. From mile post 33 on Oregon Route 6 near Lees Camp, access is via Saddlemountain Road. Nine miles from Highway 6 is a gate, the summit is then 0.5 miles from that point. The lower peak containing the radio tower is in Tillamook County.

== See also ==
- Wilson River
