= Ezra Fisher =

American missionary

Reverend Ezra Fisher (1800–1874) was an American Baptist missionary and pioneer from Oregon.

== Biography ==
Ezra Fisher was born in Wendell, Massachusetts on January 6, 1800. He attended Amherst College beginning in 1822, graduating in 1828 after illness delayed his studies. He entered Newton Theological Seminary in 1829. In 1830, he was ordained as a minister and he married the same year. Fisher came to the Oregon Country in 1845, with the Rev. Hezekiah Johnson and their families as employees of the American Baptist Home Mission Society. The Fisher family spent winter in the cabin of fellow Baptist David T. Lenox and his family on the Tualatin Plains. Later, he joined the California Gold Rush and returned to Oregon with about $1,000 in gold. In 1850, he bought Sam Barlow's original land claim near Oregon City. He helped found Oregon City College, a predecessor of Linfield College. Fisher moved to The Dalles in 1861, where he preached and served as the Wasco County school superintendent.

== Legacy ==
Ezra Fisher is one of the 158 names of people important to Oregon's history that are painted in the House and Senate chambers of the Oregon State Capitol. Fisher's name is in the Senate chamber.

== See also ==
- West Union Baptist Church
