= Scoggins Creek =

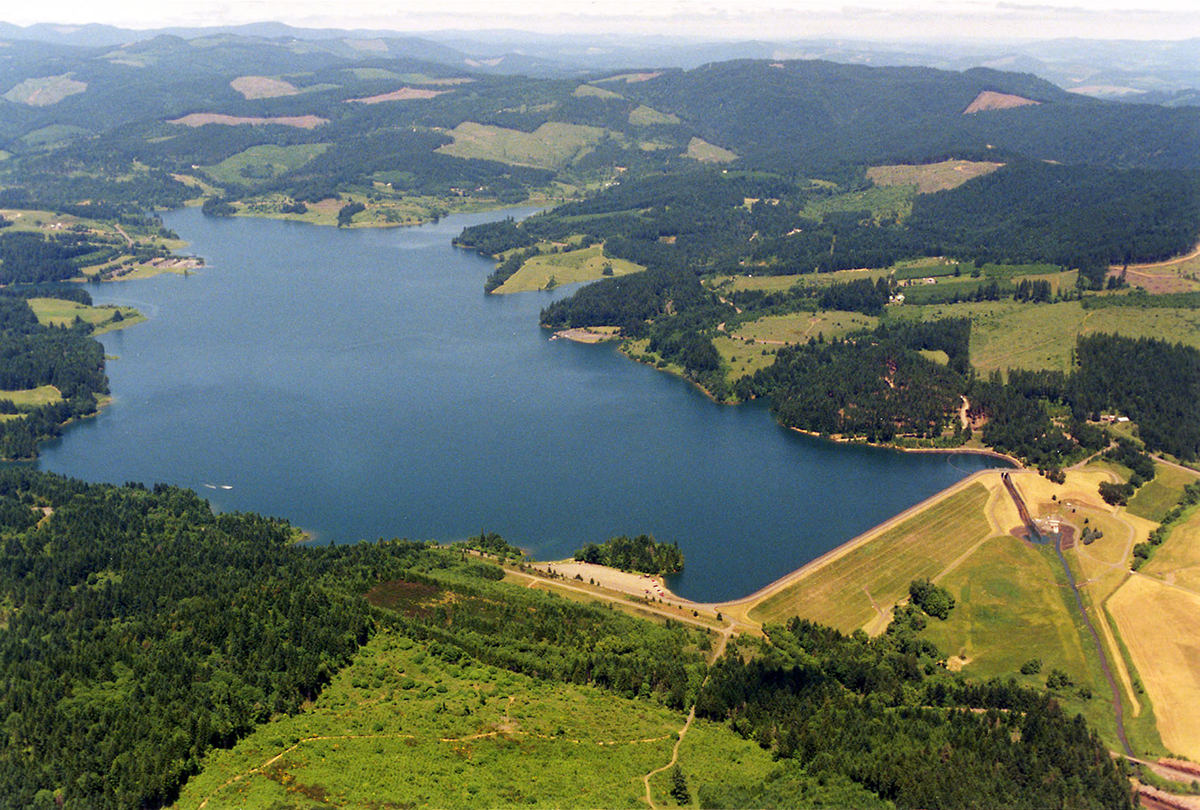
- Aerial view of Henry Hagg Lake and Scoggins Dam

- Location of the mouth of Scoggins Creek in Oregon
- Etymology: For pioneer settler Gustavus Scoggin

Location
- Country: United States
- State: Oregon
- Counties: Tillamook, Washington

Physical characteristics
- Source: Northern Oregon Coast Range
  - location: South Saddle Mountain, Tillamook County
  - coordinates: 45°33′16″N 123°22′23″W
  - elevation: 2,948 ft (899 m)
- Mouth: Tualatin River
  - location: between Dilley and Gaston, Washington County
  - coordinates: 45°27′36″N 123°07′33″W
  - elevation: 171 ft (52 m)
- Length: 19.2 mi (30.9 km)
- Basin size: 45.1 sq mi (117 km^{2})

Scoggins Creek, formerly known as "Scoggin Creek", is a 19-mile (31 km) tributary of the Tualatin River in Tillamook and Washington counties in the U.S. state of Oregon. It is named for pioneer settler Gustavus Scoggin.

Surrounded by lava and basalt flows and layers of sandstone, it flows generally southeast from near South Saddle Mountain in the Northern Oregon Coast Range and through a 1,700-foot (520 m)-wide valley to Henry Hagg Lake, an impoundment of Scoggins Dam. Just downstream from the lake, the creek empties into the Tualatin River about 20 miles (32 km) west of Portland, at an elevation of 171 feet (52 m). The creek enters the Tualatin River 60 miles (97 km) upstream of the Tualatin's confluence with the Willamette River.

The five named tributaries of Scoggins Creek from source to mouth are Fisher, Parsons, Wall, Tanner, and Sain creeks. Wall, Tanner, and Sain enter at Hagg Lake.

== See also ==
- List of rivers of Oregon
