= Shadowood, Oregon =

Unincorporated community in the state of Oregon, United States

- Unincorporated community
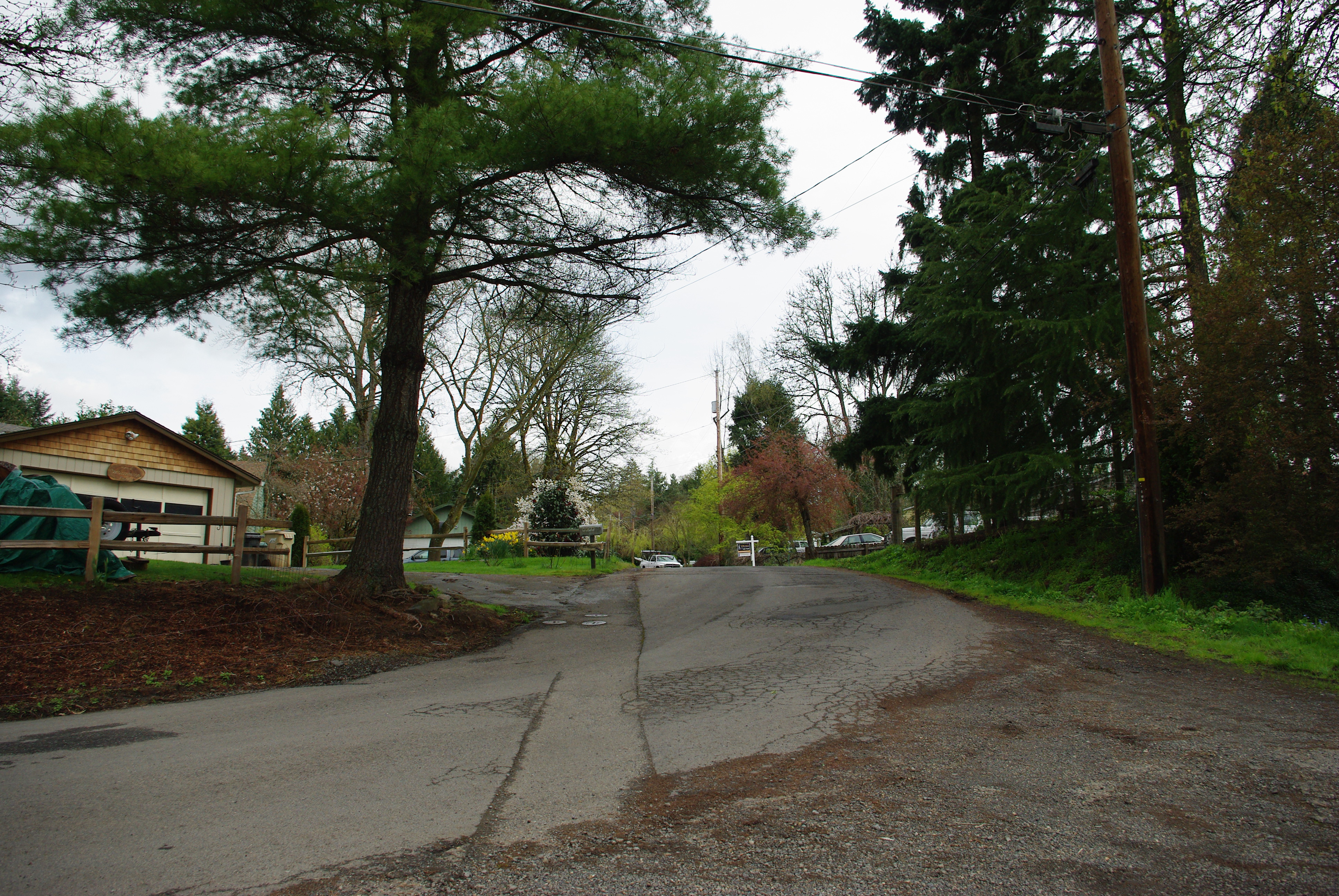
- Street in the community

- Location within Oregon
- Coordinates: 45°22′43″N 122°41′40″W
- Country: United States
- State: Oregon
- County: Clackamas
- Elevation: 190 ft (58 m)
- Time zone: UTC-8 (Pacific (PST))
  - Summer (DST): UTC-7 (PDT)
- ZIP code: 97068
- GNIS feature ID: 1136738

Shadowood is an unincorporated community in Clackamas County, Oregon, United States, about four miles south of Lake Oswego on the Tualatin River east of Shipley Bridge. Shadowood has a West Linn ZIP code.

The Shadowood area is a rural neighborhood comprising approximately 64 residences on both sides of a ravine formed by an unnamed creek and containing wetlands. The subdivision is served by a water system originally constructed in 1922 that started providing service in 1924.

The subdivision is named Shadow Wood Park and was originally a 1920s development of recreational retreats. The original residences were American Craftsman/Rustic-style log houses.
