= Scogin =

Scogin is a surname. Notable people with the surname include:

- Forrest Scogin, American clinical psychologist
- Josh Scogin (born 1981), American musician
