= Cook Park (Tigard, Oregon) =

Public park in Tigard, Oregon, U.S.

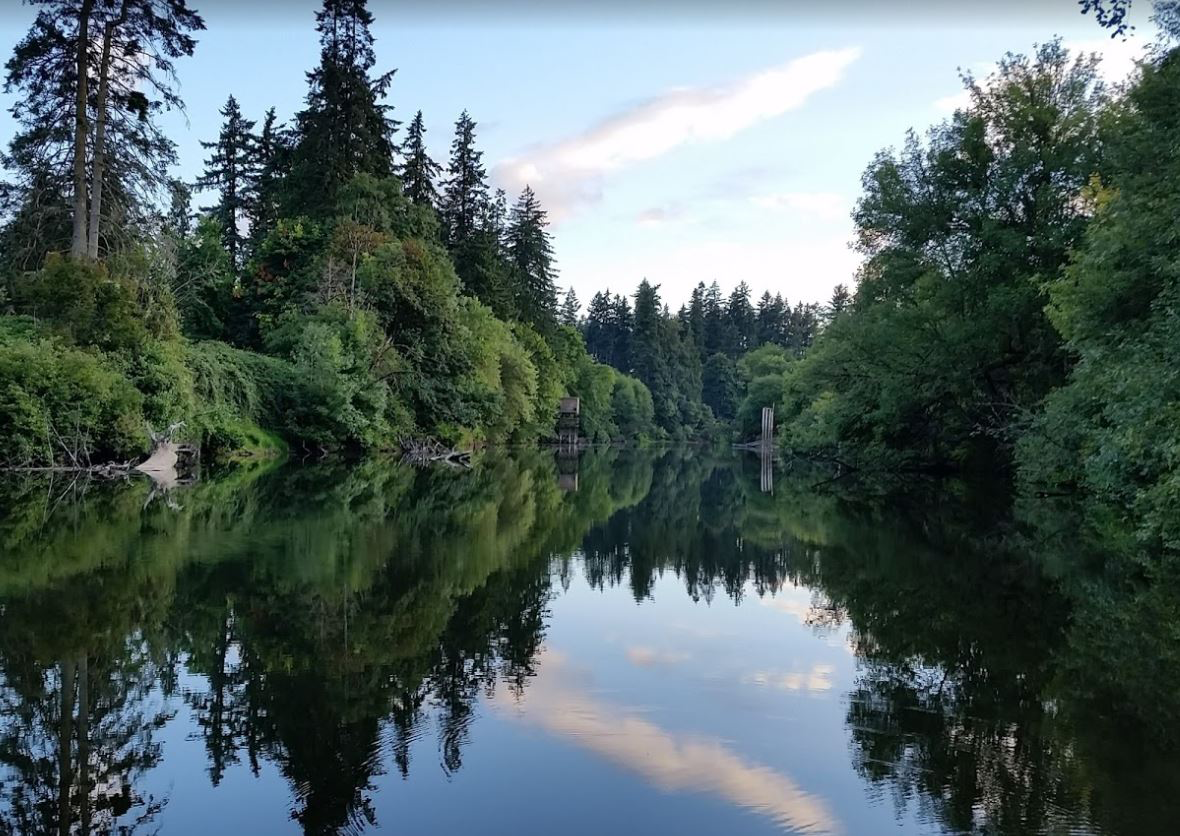
- Tualatin River, bordering the south end of Cook Park
- Interactive map of Cook Park
- Type: Community Park
- Location: 17005 SW 92nd Ave Tigard, OR 97224
- Coordinates: 45°23′48″N 122°46′21″W
- Area: 79-acre (32 ha)
- Created: ca. 1964
- Operator: City of Tigard Parks & Recreation
- Status: Daily, Dawn - Dusk

Cook Park, also known as Cook Family Park, is a 79-acre (32 ha) ADA accessible neighborhood park in Tigard, Oregon, United States. It features four baseball fields, a soccer field, basketball courts, a boat ramp, a butterfly garden, a horseshoe pit, multiple gazebos, paved and unpaved paths, playgrounds, picnic shelters and restrooms. The park is located south past Tigard High School at the end of SW 92nd Ave.

The park shares a name with the nearby neighborhoods as well.

== Landscape features ==
Cook Park is situated south of the Durham Advanced Wastewater Treatment Facility (WWTF) wetlands, which stretches along to the northeast end of the park between the Tualatin River and Tigard High School.

The Tualatin River Trail, which feeds through the entire south end of the park, connects to the Ki-a-Kuts Pedestrian Bridge which has connecting paths to Durham City Park and Tualatin Community Park.

The Oregon Festival Of Balloons is typically held on its two north fields.
