= Clean Water Services =

Coordinates: 45°30′06″N 122°59′23″W

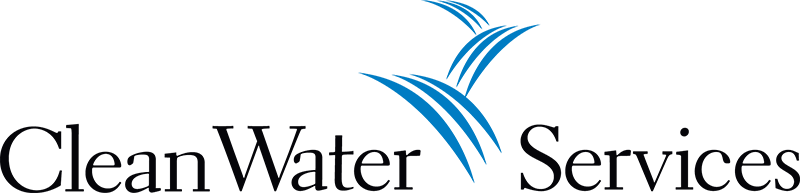
- Type: Public utility
- Genre: Wastewater treatment
- Founded: 1970; 56 years ago
- Headquarters: Hillsboro, Oregon, United States
- Area served: Washington County
- Website: cleanwaterservices.org

Clean Water Services is the water resources management utility for more than 600,000 residents in urban Washington County, Oregon, and small portions of Multnomah County, Oregon, and Clackamas County, Oregon, in the United States. Clean Water Services operates four wastewater treatment facilities, constructs and maintains flood management and water quality projects, and manages flow into the Tualatin River to improve water quality and protect fish habitat. They are headquartered in Hillsboro.

== History ==
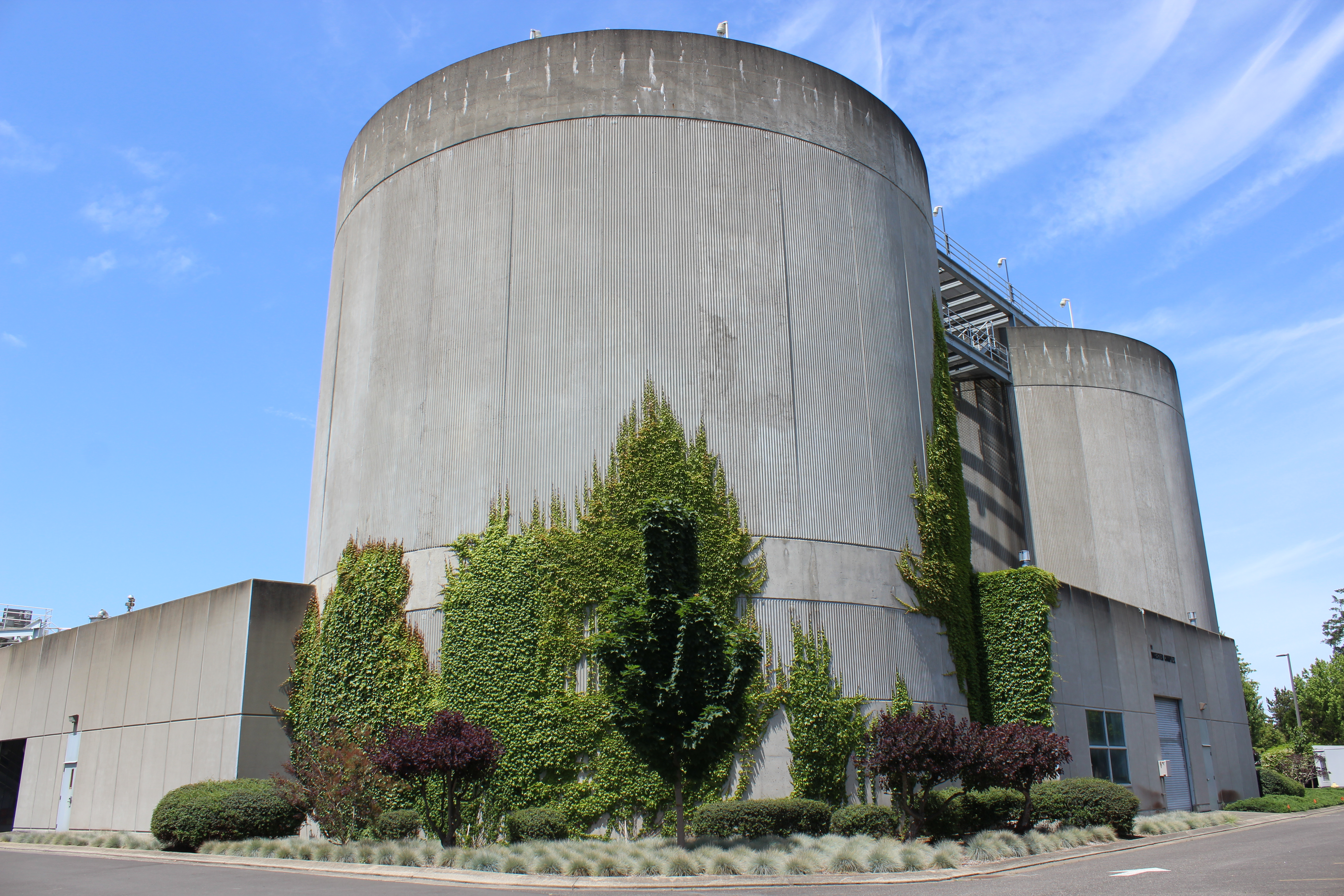
A photo from Clean Water Services' Rock Creek treatment facility

In 1969, Oregon's Department of Environmental Quality placed a temporary halt to new construction in Washington County. On February 3, 1970, ten cities and sixteen sanitary districts combined to form the Unified Sewerage Agency (USA). Later that year, voters in the new district approved a $36 million bond measure to consolidate, construct and upgrade USA's regional public wastewater treatment facilities. The Durham Wastewater Treatment Facility opened in 1976, which replaced 14 smaller treatment plants. Two years later six more treatment plants were replaced with the opening of the Rock Creek Wastewater Treatment Facility.

As population continued to grow in the service area of USA, the water quality of the Tualatin River worsened. In 1986, the Northwest Environmental Defense Center filed a lawsuit against the United States Environmental Protection Agency, prompting Total maximum daily loads for the Tualatin River. A Clean Water Act amendment added regulation of storm-water runoff, and the Rock Creek Facility achieved 99% removal of ammonia nitrogen. In 1988, the Tualatin Valley Water Quality Endowment Fund was established by the Northwest Environmental Defense Center lawsuit.

USA worked to maintain the quality of the Tualatin River by establishing Surface Water Management (SWM) utility for water quality and drainage in 1990, and began a $200 million facility expansion and upgrade program to meet compliance deadlines. That same year, the agency established the River Rangers program. USA began consumption-based rates and combined billing with water providers in 1994.

In July 2001, the Unified Sewerage Agency renamed itself as Clean Water Services at a cost of $60,000. Clean Water Services' Operations Building opened in 2003, which is used as a showcase of low impact development. The same year, the Administrative Building Complex opened. It was the first LEED Gold certified public building in Washington County. In 2004, the agency began a program to add shade along the watershed's streams and river by planting trees and shrubs to lower temperatures of the waterways. This program received approval from environmental regulators and was in lieu of spending $150 million to build chilling systems at the four treatment facilities.

The agency's Rock Creek facility won an EPA National Clean Water Act Recognition Award in 2006, and in 2008 the Durham facility's Influent Pump Station was the first to earn LEED Silver certification. The following year the Durham plant became the United States' first wastewater treatment plant to produce commercial fertilizer. In 2010, the Clean Water Institute was established by the agency.

== Services ==
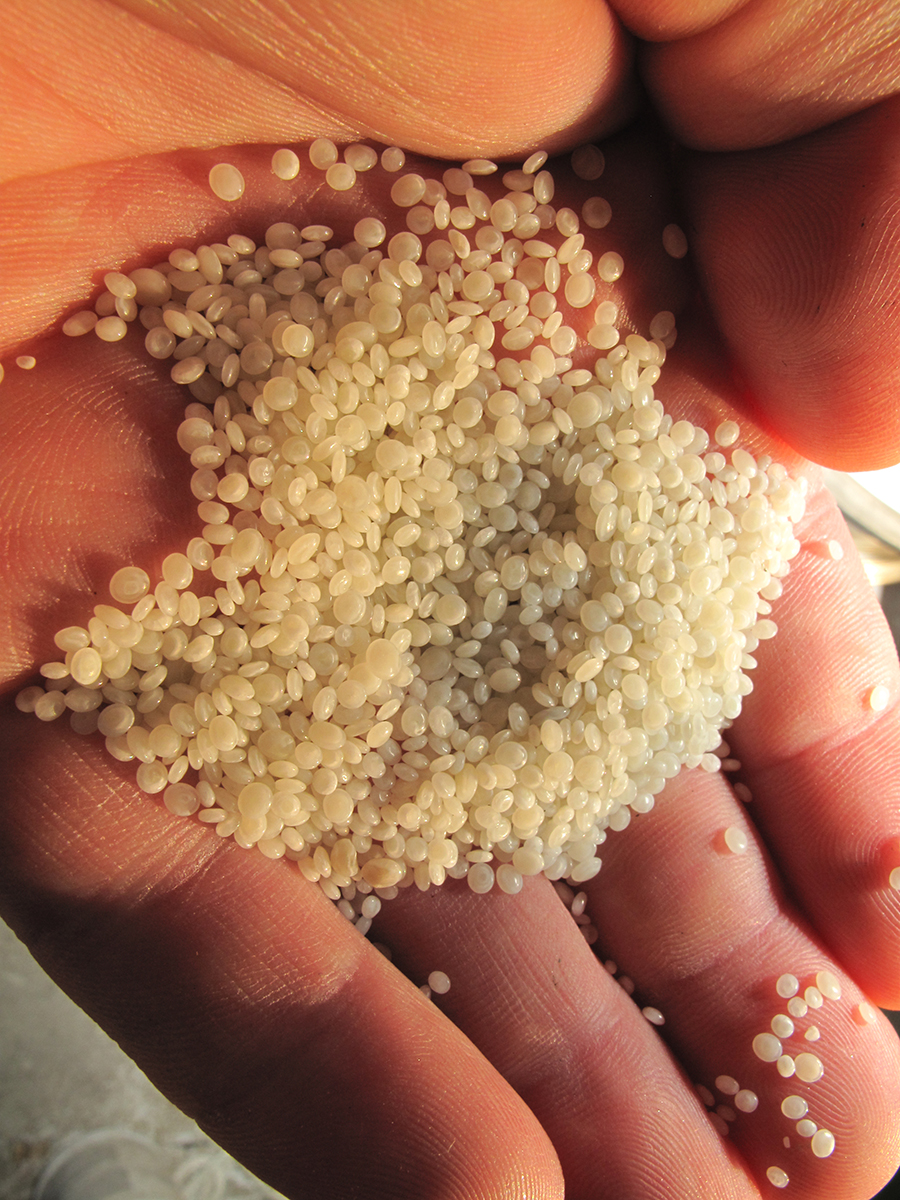
Ostara fertilizer in hand

Clean Water Services provides stormwater and wastewater services in partnership with 12 member cities that include; Beaverton, Tigard, Tualatin, Hillsboro, King City, Forest Grove, Sherwood, Cornelius, Banks, Gaston, Durham, and North Plains.

Clean Water Services is a special service district that serves as a separately managed and financed public utility. The Washington County Commissioners serve as the board of directors for Clean Water Services.

As a wastewater utility, Clean Water Services cleans more than 60 million US gallons (230,000 m^{3}) of wastewater a day. The wastewater treatment process uses physical, biological, and chemical treatment to clean wastewater to some of the highest standards in the nation. The cleaned wastewater is then released into the Tualatin River. The wastewater is collected by a vast network of more than 800 miles (1,300 km) of sewer lines and 39 pump stations and routed to one of four treatment plants—Durham, Rock Creek, Hillsboro and Forest Grove.

Ten percent of the wastewater treated by Clean Water Services is used for irrigation and in area wetlands during the summer months. Biosolids recovered through the treatment process are sold to farmers in the region as fertilizer. Additionally, the Durham Advanced Wastewater Treatment Facility is the first in the nation to recover fertilizer from a natural byproduct of wastewater treatment. In 2007 the Durham facility began working with Ostara Nutrient Recovery Technologies to construct a $2.5 million multi-reactor plant that allows the Durham facility to run part of its waste stream through special reactors that transform potentially damaging nutrients into environmentally friendly fertilizer, which Ostara sells commercially.

As a surface water management utility, The District's Stormwater Management (SWM) program improves water quality, protects fish habitat and manages drainage by operating and maintaining the stormwater conveyance system, establishing design and construction standards, regulating activities that can impact the watershed and enhancing streams and floodplains. Clean Water Services is the regional SWM utility for urban Washington County. In cooperation with Washington County and the 12 member cities Clean Water Services maintains and enhances the public drainage system to meet public needs and to comply with strict water quality regulations set for the Tualatin River drainage area by the Oregon Department of Environmental Quality (DEQ).

Clean Water Services offers a classroom educational program called River Rangers geared toward 4th-grade students. Environmental educators interactively teach students about the water cycle, watersheds, surface water pollution, water conservation and wastewater treatment. The 45-minute presentation is used to educate students about how people impact water quality through use of sewer and storm systems.

== Tualatin River ==
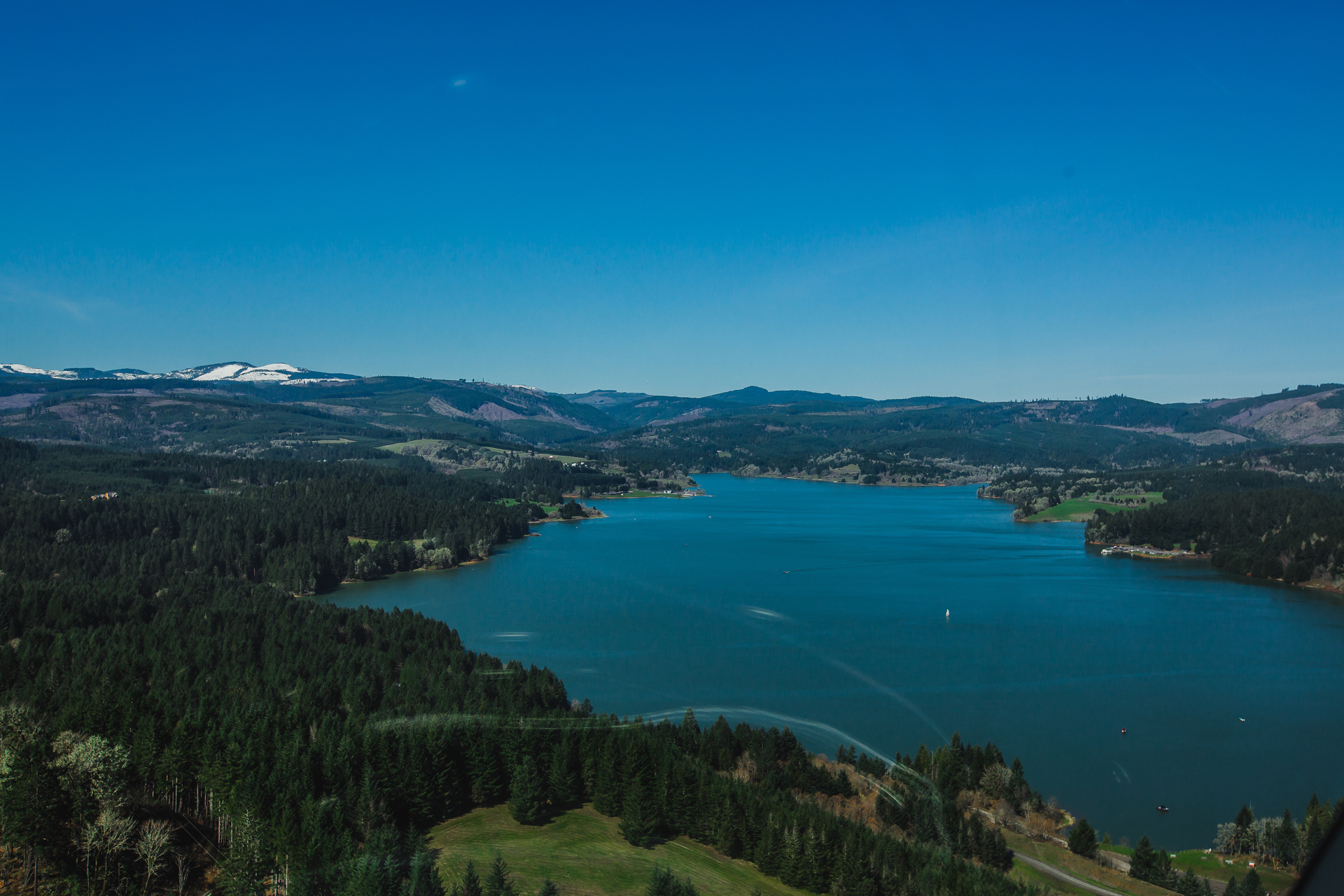
An aerial image of Hagg Lake

The 80-mile (130 km)-long Tualatin River meanders slowly through relatively flat terrain, draining more than 700 square miles (1,800 km^{2}) of forested, agricultural and urban areas before joining the Willamette River. The Tualatin is Washington County's only river, and it is used for the regional drinking water supply, agricultural irrigation, and recreational activities. Clean Water Services has worked to protect the health of the watershed through programs such as the planting of trees and shrubs along the water corridors.

== Water supply ==
As communities in the Tualatin Basin continue to grow, more water will be needed for municipal and industrial uses. In addition, more water is needed to augment flow in the Tualatin River and its tributaries for water quality. The two water supply options being considered assume aggressive conservation targets for homes and businesses, wastewater reuse, and aquifer storage and recovery.

These options are:

- A 40-foot (12 m) dam raise at Henry Hagg Lake with a raw water pipeline pumpback.
- A multiple source option that includes a 25-foot (7.6 m) dam raise at Hagg Lake with a raw water pipeline pumpback and expansion of the Willamette River Water Treatment Plant for municipal uses.

== Expense Controversy ==
In 2016, Clean Water Services created a captive insurance subsidiary incorporated in Hawaii with no employees overseen by the agency's executives who receive an additional $60,000 each for their board service. The water agency pays annual premiums to its insurance subsidiary. Because Hawaiian law requires at least one board meeting to be held in that state per year, the agency's executives are flown annually to 5-star resorts in Hawaii for their annual meeting, with the Executive Director flying first class, with the total cost of the 2023 trip being $42,000. The Executive Director also received premium accommodations costing $6,928. Because the insurance subsidiary is based in Hawaii, The subsidiaries' lawyer claims it is not subject to Oregon's Public records law, meaning any record held by the captive can be withheld from public disclosure.
