= Mount Cook National Park =

Mount Cook National Park may refer to the following:

- Mount Cook National Park, Australia
- Aoraki / Mount Cook National Park, New Zealand
