= USS Scroggins =

Buckley-class destroyer escort of the United States Navy

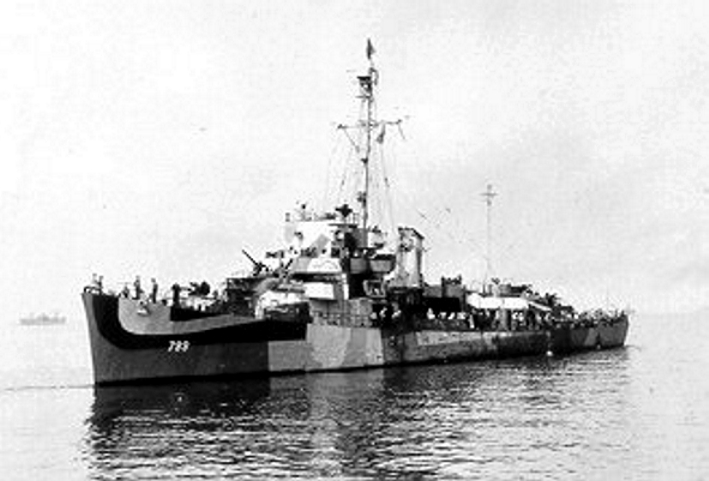

History

United States
- Builder: Consolidated Steel Corp., Orange, Texas
- Laid down: 4 September 1943
- Launched: 6 November 1943
- Commissioned: 30 March 1944
- Decommissioned: 15 June 1946
- Stricken: 1 July 1965
- Fate: Sold for scrap, 5 April 1967

General characteristics
- Displacement: 1,740 tons full; 1,400 tons, standard
- Length: 306 ft 0 in (93 m)
- Beam: 36 ft 9 in (11.20 m)
- Draft: 13 ft 6 in (4.11 m)
- Propulsion: GE turbo-electric drive; 12,000 shp (8.9 MW); two propellers
- Speed: 24 knots (44 km/h)
- Range: 4,940 nautical miles (9,150 km) at 12 knots (22 km/h)
- Complement: 15 officers, 198 men
- Armament: 3 × 3 in (76 mm) DP guns; 3 × 21 in (53 cm) torpedo tubes; 1 × 1.1 in (28 mm) quad AA gun; 8 × 20 mm cannon; 1 × hedgehog projector; 2 × depth charge tracks; 8 × K-gun depth charge projectors

USS Scroggins (DE-799) was a Buckley-class destroyer escort in service with the United States Navy from 1944 to 1946. She was scrapped in 1947.

== History ==
Scroggins was laid down on 4 September 1943 by the Consolidated Steel Corp., Orange, Texas; launched on 6 November 1943; sponsored by Mrs. Dartha Hardin, sister of Aviation Radioman Scroggins; and commissioned on 30 March 1944.

=== Battle of the Atlantic ===
After shakedown, Scroggins sailed on 1 June 1944 for the first of three convoy voyages from the east coast to Bizerte, Tunisia. On 12 November, after returning from her third voyage to the Mediterranean, Scroggins underwent refresher training at Casco Bay, Maine; and then arrived in Argentia, Newfoundland, on 18 December for antisubmarine duty. Except for short periods in port and six days of training off New London, Conn. between 12 and 17 March, she carried out antisubmarine patrols and sweeps in the approaches to Halifax, N.S., as part of a hunter-killer force until 18 April 1945. Between 30 April and 5 May, Scroggins carried out similar patrols off Long Island before proceeding to Norfolk. On V-E day, she was placed on four-hours notice in case she was needed to escort surrendered German submarines to United States ports, but did not have to get underway.

Scroggins departed Norfolk on 15 May to screen Guadalcanal (CVE-60) off Jacksonville while the escort carrier qualified pilots for carrier operations. Detached from this duty on 5 June, she then served as a seagoing training ship for the Naval Training Center at Miami, Fla., from 6 June to 17 July. After overhaul at New York and refresher training at Guantanamo Bay, Cuba, she served as a training ship with submarines at New London from 5 September to 9 December 1945. Between 9 January and 14 February 1946, the escort served as plane guard for Salerno Bay (CVE-110) off Norfolk, and then returned to New London for more submarine training between 26 February and 1 April.

=== Decommissioning and fate ===
The ship arrived at Green Cove Springs, Fla., on 2 May for inactivation; was decommissioned on 15 June 1946; and was placed in reserve there. Scroggins was struck from the Navy list on 1 July 1965 and sold on 5 April 1967 to the Peck Iron and Metals Co., Portsmouth, Virginia, for scrapping.

== Namesake ==
Ted H. Scroggins was born on 13 September 1918 in Tahlequah, Oklahoma. He enlisted in the United States Navy on 7 December 1939. Aviation Radioman Second Class Scroggins was awarded the Air Medal posthumously for his devotion to duty in the face of adverse weather and persistent enemy antiaircraft fire, during patrol missions and bombing attacks on Imperial Japanese Navy ships in Kiska Harbor. He was lost in action on 15 June 1942 on an air mission in the Aleutians.
