= Tualatin River =

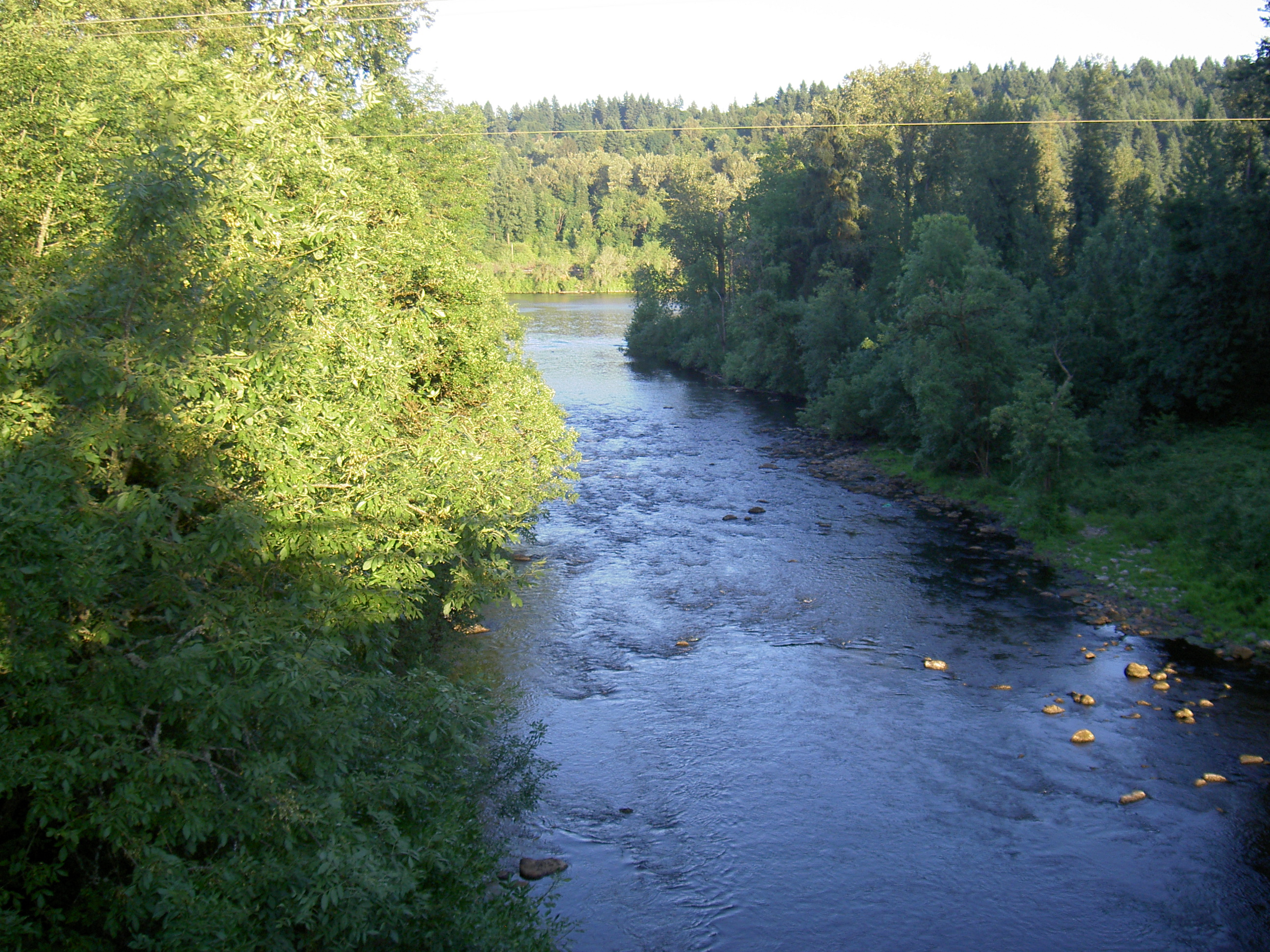
- Mouth of the Tualatin River

- Location of the mouth of the Tualatin River in Oregon
- Etymology: Probably an Indian word meaning "lazy" or "sluggish" but possibly meaning "treeless plain" for the plain near the river or "forked" for its many tributaries

Location
- Country: United States
- State: Oregon
- County: Washington, Clackamas

Physical characteristics
- Source: Northern Oregon Coast Range
  - location: near Windy Point, Tillamook State Forest, Washington County, Oregon
  - coordinates: 45°28′55″N 123°24′21″W
  - elevation: 1,978 ft (603 m)
- Mouth: Willamette River
  - location: near West Linn, Clackamas County, Oregon
  - coordinates: 45°20′17″N 122°39′05″W
  - elevation: 59 ft (18 m)
- Length: 83 mi (134 km)
- Basin size: 712 sq mi (1,840 km^{2})
- Discharge
  - location: near West Linn, 1.8 miles (2.9 km) from the mouth
  - average: 1,465 cu ft/s (41.5 m^{3}/s)
  - minimum: 0.20 cu ft/s (0.0057 m^{3}/s)
  - maximum: 26,400 cu ft/s (750 m^{3}/s)

The Tualatin River is a tributary of the Willamette River in Oregon in the United States. The river is about 83 miles (134 km) long, and it drains a fertile farming region called the Tualatin Valley southwest and west of Portland at the northwest corner of the Willamette Valley. There are approximately 500,000 people residing on 15 percent of the land in the river's watershed.

== Course ==
The Tualatin River arises near Windy Point on the eastern side of the Northern Oregon Coast Range. It begins in the Tillamook State Forest in Washington County and flows about 83 miles (134 km) to the Willamette River near West Linn in Clackamas County. Along the way, it falls from about 2,000 feet (610 m) above sea level to about 60 feet (18 m), most of that occurring in its first 15 miles (24 km). From the unincorporated community of Cherry Grove, 68 miles (109 km) from the mouth, the river falls only about 220 feet (67 m) in meanders that trend generally east across the relatively flat Tualatin Valley.

From its source, the river flows south for about 1 mile (1.6 km) before turning east to parallel to Blind Cabin Ridge, which is to the river's right. Shortly thereafter, the river plunges over the 40-foot (12 m) Ki-a-Kuts Falls, then receives Maple Creek from the left and then Sunday Creek, also from the left, at river mile (RM) 76.7 (RK 123.4). Lee Creek enters from the left and Patten Creek from the right before the river reaches Hillsboro Reservoir and then Haines Falls at about RM 73 (RK 117). Hillsboro Reservoir Road and Southwest Lee Falls Road run roughly parallel to the river along its left bank from the reservoir to the unincorporated community of Cherry Grove. Over the next stretch, the river runs roughly parallel to Hagerty Ridge, which is on the right. About 2 miles (3 km) further downstream, the river goes over Lee Falls and, shortly thereafter, Little Lee Falls before reaching Cherry Grove, which is on the river's left at the west end of Patton Valley. At Cherry Grove, the river passes under Roaring Creek Road, receives Roaring Creek from the right, passes under Bruce Road and Southwest S Road, and receives Hering Creek from the left. Thereafter, it flows under Northwest Mount Richmond Road and receives Mercer Creek from the left about 65 miles (105 km) from the river's mouth. Below this, Black Jack Creek enters from the left, and the river passes under Oregon Route 47 and flows by the city of Gaston, which is to the right.

Turning north near Gaston and meandering roughly parallel to Route 47 to the west (left), the river receives Wapato Creek, which flows through the former Wapato Lake, from the right and Scoggins Creek, which drains Henry Hagg Lake, from the left at RM 60 (RK 97). Soon, O'Neill Creek enters from the left, and shortly thereafter, the river passes under Southwest Spring Hill Road, then receives Dilley Creek from the left at about RM 57.5 (RK 92.5). At this point, the unincorporated community of Dilley is on the left. At Dilley, the stream meanders east away from the highway and soon receives Carpenter Creek from the left and then Gales Creek. Along this stretch of the river, the city of Forest Grove is north (left) of the river. Meandering generally east, the river passes under Southwest Fern Hill Road, by the city of Cornelius to the left and the unincorporated community of Blooming to the right, and passes under Golf Course Road about 52 miles (84 km) from the mouth. Dairy Creek enters from the left at about RM 45 (RK 72) as the river approaches Hillsboro, which is to the river's left. Wandering through Jackson Bottom and the Jackson Bottom Wetlands Preserve, the river passes under Oregon Route 219 (Southwest Hillsboro Highway), and soon receives Jackson Slough from the left, then Davis Creek from the right at RM 40 (RK 64).

Passing under Minter Bridge Road about 41 miles (66 km) from the mouth, and then Rood Bridge Road, the river wanders by the Meriwether National Golf Course which is on its right and The Reserve Vineyards & Golf Club, which is to the left, and receives Rock Creek, Gordon Creek, and Butternut Creek, all from the left. Flowing south from the vicinity of the golf course, the river runs roughly parallel to River Road, which is on its left. It passes under Harris Bridge, which carries Oregon Route 10 and Oregon Route 208 (Southwest Farmington Road) at the unincorporated community of Farmington. Further downstream, it receives Christensen and Burris creeks from the right and continues south until turning east again at about RM 30 (RK 48). Shortly thereafter, it flows by the unincorporated community of Scholls, where it receives McFee Creek from the right before passing under Scholls Bridge and Oregon Route 210. Entering the Tualatin River National Wildlife Refuge at about RM 25 (RK 40).

Leaving the wildlife refuge about 4 miles (6 km) later, the rivers meanders around the unincorporated community of Bull Mountain, which is on its left (north), passes under Roy Rogers Road, receives Chicken Creek and Rock Creek from the right, then passes under Oregon Route 99W (Southwest Pacific Highway) at King City. The river continues by Avalon Park, which is on its left, flows through Cook Park in Tigard, which is on its left, and forms the north boundary of the Tualatin Country Club, which is on the right. Immediately thereafter, the river receives Fanno Creek from the left just after passing under a Portland & Western Railroad bridge and a pedestrian bridge between Tigard and Durham on the left (north) and Tualatin on the right. Durham City Park is on the left bank, and Tualatin Park is on the right. The stream passes under another Portland & Western Railroad bridge, then under Southwest Boones Ferry Road and then under Interstate 5, the latter at about RM 8 (RK 13), and enters Clackamas County.

Shortly thereafter, the river passes Browns Ferry Park, which is on the river's right, and then Canal Acres Park, on the left. At the east end of the park, Saum Creek enters from the right, and the Oswego Canal, which carries water from the Tualatin River to Oswego Lake in Lake Oswego, is on the left. Beyond the canal entrance, the river passes River Run Park, which is on the left. Soon Athey Creek enters from the right and Pecan Creek from the left before the river passes under Southwest Stafford Road near the unincorporated area of Wankers Corner and flows past the unincorporated community of Shadowood. In its final 5 miles (8 km), the river receives Wilson Creek from the right, passes under Interstate 205 and then under Southwest Borland Road, and receives Fields Creek from the left. It flows by Swift Shore Park, which is on the left, under Southwest Pete's Mountain Road, by Willamette Park, also on the left, and enters the Willamette River at West Linn, about 28 miles (45 km) from the larger river's confluence with the Columbia River. The mouth is five miles away from oswego lake. the closest tributary to the mouth is the fanno creek.

=== Discharge ===
The highest flow ever recorded in the river was 26,400 cubic feet per second (750 m^{3}/s) on February 10, 1996, at the West Linn gauge. The lowest flow ever recorded at this gauge was 0.20 cubic feet per second (0.0057 m^{3}/s) between July 30 and August 2, 1966. This flow does not include the estimated flow of 3,600 cubic feet per second (100 m^{3}/s) from the river through the Lake Oswego Canal.

== History ==
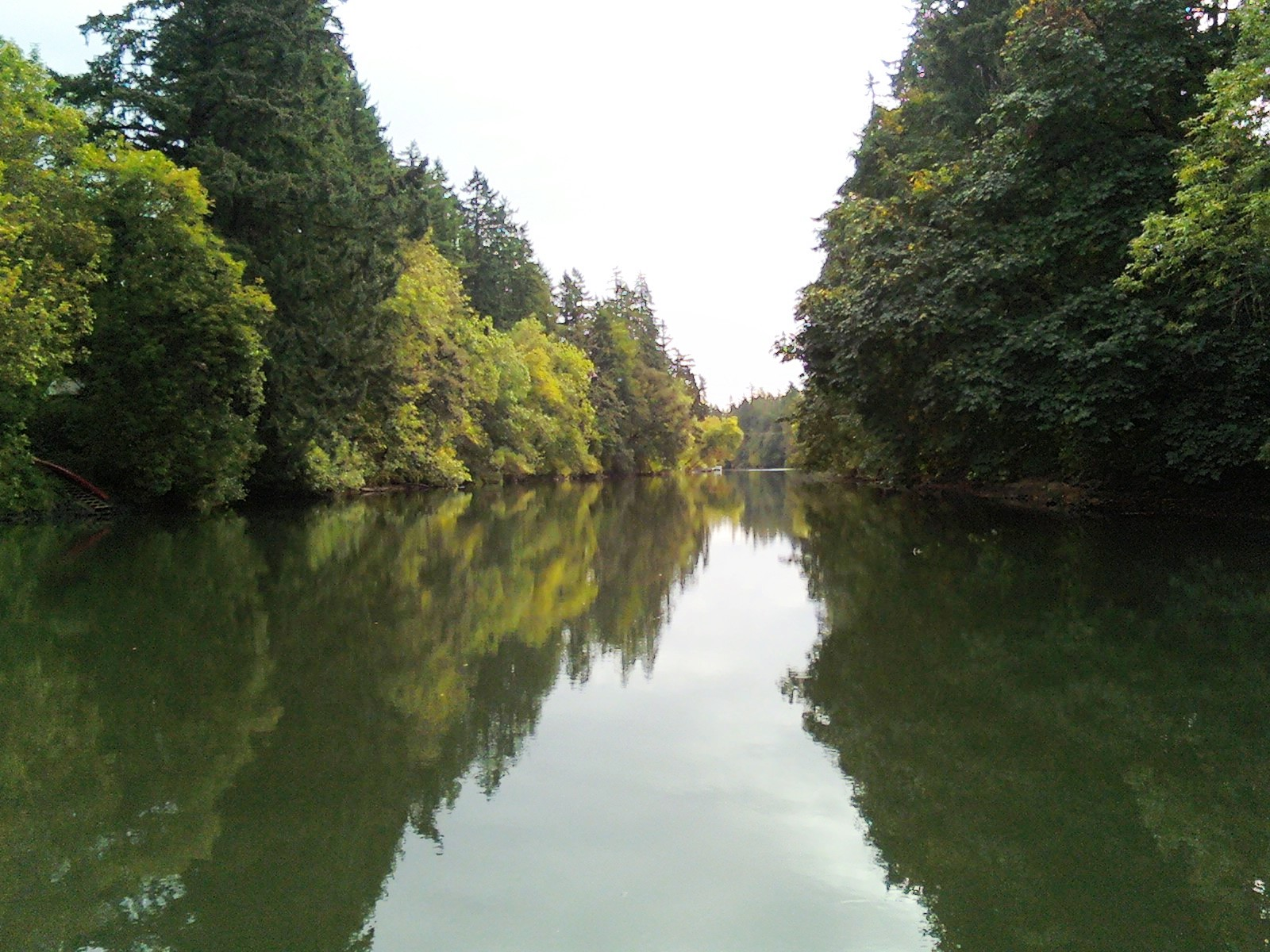
The Tualatin as it passes Rivergrove on the left and Tualatin on the right

The Tualatin River was named by the local Native American band, the Atafalati, that lived in the Tualatin Valley. The name is translated as sluggish or lazy. Early settlers called it the "Quality River".

By 1851, multiple ferries were present along the river's banks including "Dr. Brown's Ferry" at Tualatin and Scholl's Ferry.

The valley of the Tualatin was an important early farming region in the settlement of Oregon. The building of Canyon Road, a plank road to the Tualatin Valley from Portland, in 1856 is considered by historians to be one of the main reasons for Portland's rise as the dominant city in the region. The valley contains many natural wetlands, some of which have been designated the Tualatin River National Wildlife Refuge, and others are protected at Jackson Bottom Wetlands Preserve.

This same year, an act was passed by the territorial legislature to incorporate the Tualatin River Navigation & Manufacturing Company for the purpose of improving navigation.

Steamboats were still popular at this time and boats had made various attempts up the river with difficulty. One vessel arrived near Hillsboro as early as 1858 but turned back when the contractors neglected to answer the call of repeated blasts of his steam horn.

Log runs were started on the river as early as 1865. By 1867 there was regular steamboat traffic to within 2.5 miles of Forest Grove. Plans were considered to create a route 4-5 miles north of Hillsboro to Centerville.

Log jams, debris, and low-flows often made navigation difficult. In a Supreme Court decision (Weise vs Smith) it was determined the river is unnavigable.

== Pollution ==
The drainage area of the river is approximately 712 square miles (1,840 km^{2}) with 27 creeks feeding into the Tualatin. Its watershed is 15 percent urbanized, 35 percent agricultural, and 50 percent forested. The river drops 1,800 feet (550 m) in elevation during its first 12 miles (19 km) and then only an additional 250 feet (76 m) for the remaining 71 miles (114 km) of its course. This creates a slow river for the majority of the course, creating problems with pollution. Pollution reached a point that in 1989 local agencies were forced to begin cleaning up the river after the Tualatin failed water quality standards outlined in the Clean Water Act of 1972. It was the first river in the state to fail overall pollution limits.

== See also ==
- List of rivers of Oregon
- List of longest streams of Oregon
- Steamboats of the Willamette River
- Tualatin Plains
- Chehalem Mountains
