= Henry Hagg Lake =

Artificial lake in Oregon, United States

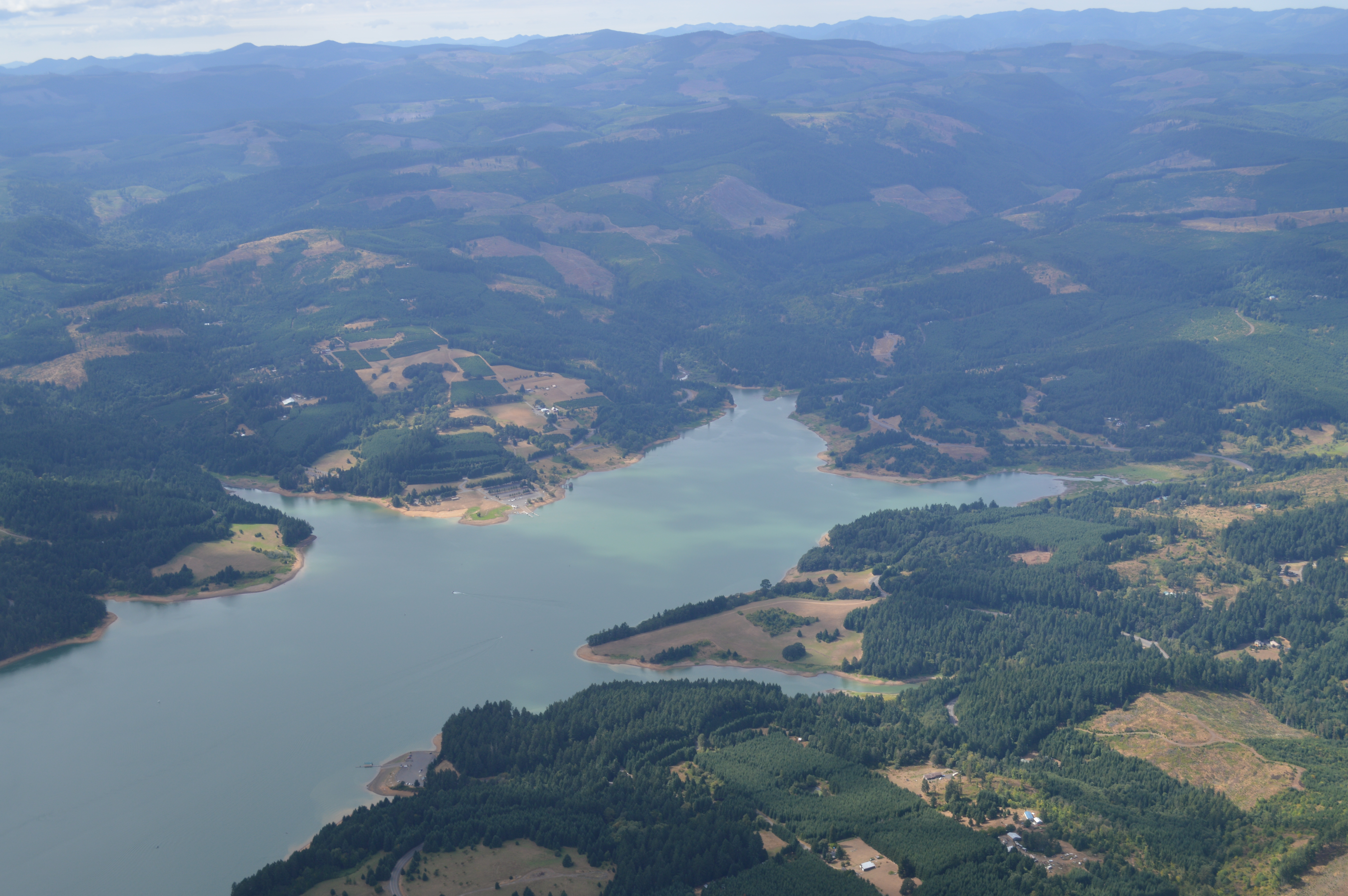
- Aerial view of the lake

- Location within Oregon Location within the United States
- Location: Oregon Coast Range foothills, Washington County, Oregon, United States
- Coordinates: 45.47345°N 123.20344°W
- Primary inflows: Scoggins Creek
- Primary outflows: Tualatin River
- Basin countries: United States
- Surface area: 1,153 acres (4.67 km^{2})
- Average depth: 51 ft (16 m)
- Max. depth: 110 ft (34 m)
- Water volume: 59,910 acre⋅ft (73,900,000 m^{3})
- Surface elevation: 303.5 ft (92.5 m)

Henry Hagg Lake (also known simply as Hagg Lake) is an artificial lake in northwest Oregon, in the United States. The reservoir is an impoundment of Scoggins Creek, which drains a small portion of the eastern side of the Northern Oregon Coast Range. The lake and creek are part of the Tualatin River’s watershed in the Tualatin Valley. It is located about 5 miles (8.0 km) southwest of Forest Grove.

The lake is named for Henry Hagg, an Oregon dairy farmer who was active in local agricultural committees during the first half of the twentieth century.

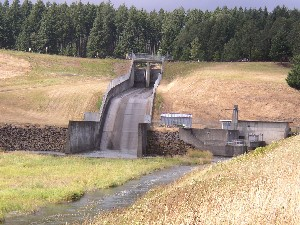
Scoggins Dam

== Scoggins Dam ==
Scoggins Dam was built in 1975 by the United States Bureau of Reclamation, which still owns and operates the facility. Hagg Lake contains 53,640 acre-feet (66,160,000 m^{3}) of water that can be used. Some water from the lake is used by Clean Water Services to augment the flow of the Tualatin River during the summer months to reduce the temperature and improve water quality. Other users include four cities and the Tualatin Valley Water District.

== Ecology and Geology ==
In 1967, fossilized shark remains were discovered near the lake.

== See also ==
- List of lakes in Oregon
