= Mountaindale, Oregon =

Unincorporated community in the state of Oregon, United States

- Unincorporated community
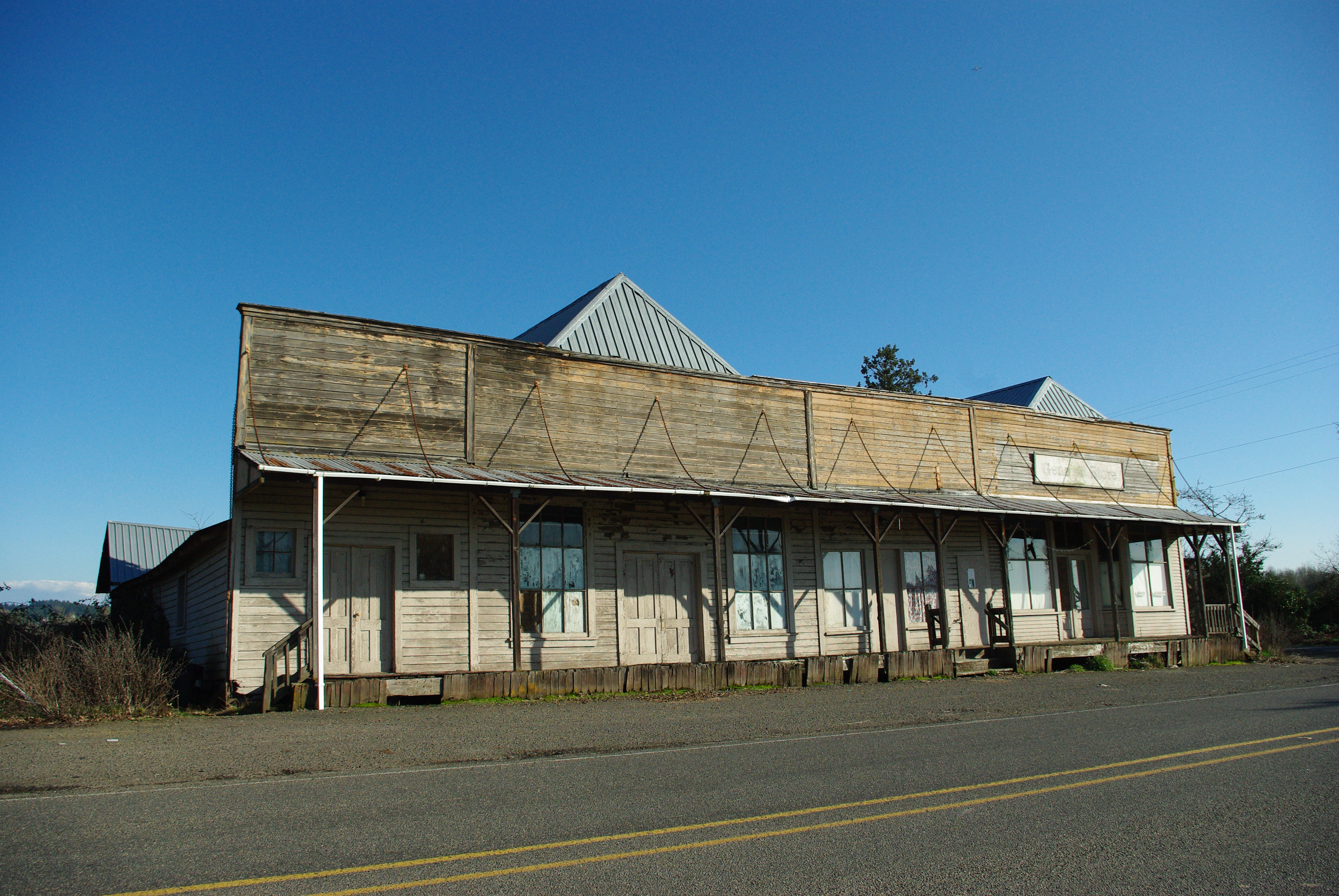
- Former Mountaindale Store at Mountaindale and Dairy Creek roads formally known as Connolly's General merchandise

- Location within the state of Oregon Mountaindale, Oregon (the United States)
- Coordinates: 45°37′29″N 123°02′20″W
- Country: United States
- State: Oregon
- County: Washington
- Elevation: 194 ft (59 m)
- Time zone: UTC-8 (Pacific (PST))
  - Summer (DST): UTC-7 (PDT)
- ZIP codes: 97133
- Area codes: 503 and 971
- GNIS feature ID: 1163167

Mountaindale is an unincorporated community in Washington County, Oregon, United States, about four miles northwest of North Plains. Settled in the 1850s, the small community was the longtime home of the Mountaindale Store. The area is part of Washington County Fire District 2.

== History ==
The Atfalati tribe of Native Americans had a seasonal campsite in the area prior to the arrival of European-Americans in the 1830s. The first Euro-American settlers in the Mountaindale area were Samuel B. and Mary Raffety, who in 1852 traveled the Oregon Trail to the Oregon Territory and settled a donation land claim in northern Washington County in the foothills of the Oregon Coast Range. Originally from Kentucky, they raised eight children on their 320-acre (130 ha) farm. One child, Charles H. Raffety, later served as mayor of East Portland before its annexation into Portland. Mountaindale School District 41 was formed on December 5, 1868, with Alzada Cornelius as the first teacher and W. D. Pittenger as the first superintendent. The school was built at that time and was located on the Dobbins land claim. The store was later built in front of the school. The post office was established in 1873 as "Mountain Dale" and the name was changed to "Mountaindale" in 1895. The name combining "mountain" and "dale" is descriptive, as the community is where East Fork Dairy Creek emerges from the foothills at the north edge of the Tualatin Valley.

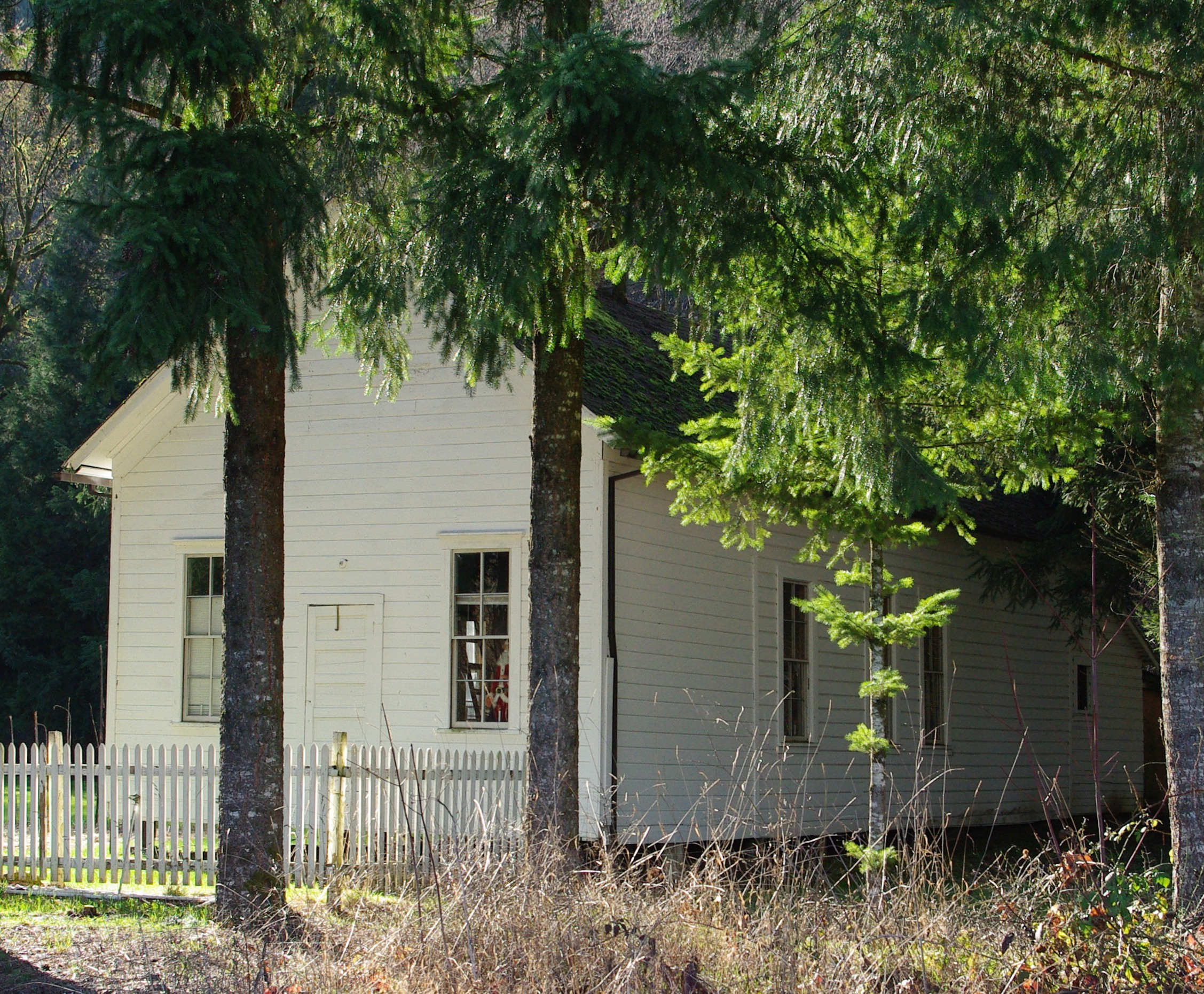
Former school in 2010

In 1885, a new schoolhouse was built for $200. It was 30 feet (9.1 m) long, 13 feet (4.0 m) wide, and 12 feet (3.7 m) tall. The new school was originally known as the Raffety School as it was built on land donated by Samuel Raffety. Charles Reynolds opened the first store in the community in 1896. In 1904, a new Mountaindale Store was built across the street from the original. Reynolds also operated a freight line and a blacksmith shop. In 1915, Mountaindale had two sawmills, and much of the area surrounding area was logged.

The Mountaindale post office closed in 1935. In February 1953, the school district was merged into the North Plains School District (originally known as the Glencoe district), which merged into the Hillsboro School District in 1996. The Mountaindale school remained in use until 1954 or 1955, and by 1976 was owned by the Stohr family.

In 1990, the only public buildings remaining in the community were the store and the closed schoolhouse. The store is also now closed.

The Mountaindale Airport is a mile southwest of the community.
