= Midway, Washington County, Oregon =

Unincorporated community in the state of Oregon, United States

Coordinates: 45.411359°N 122.959738°W

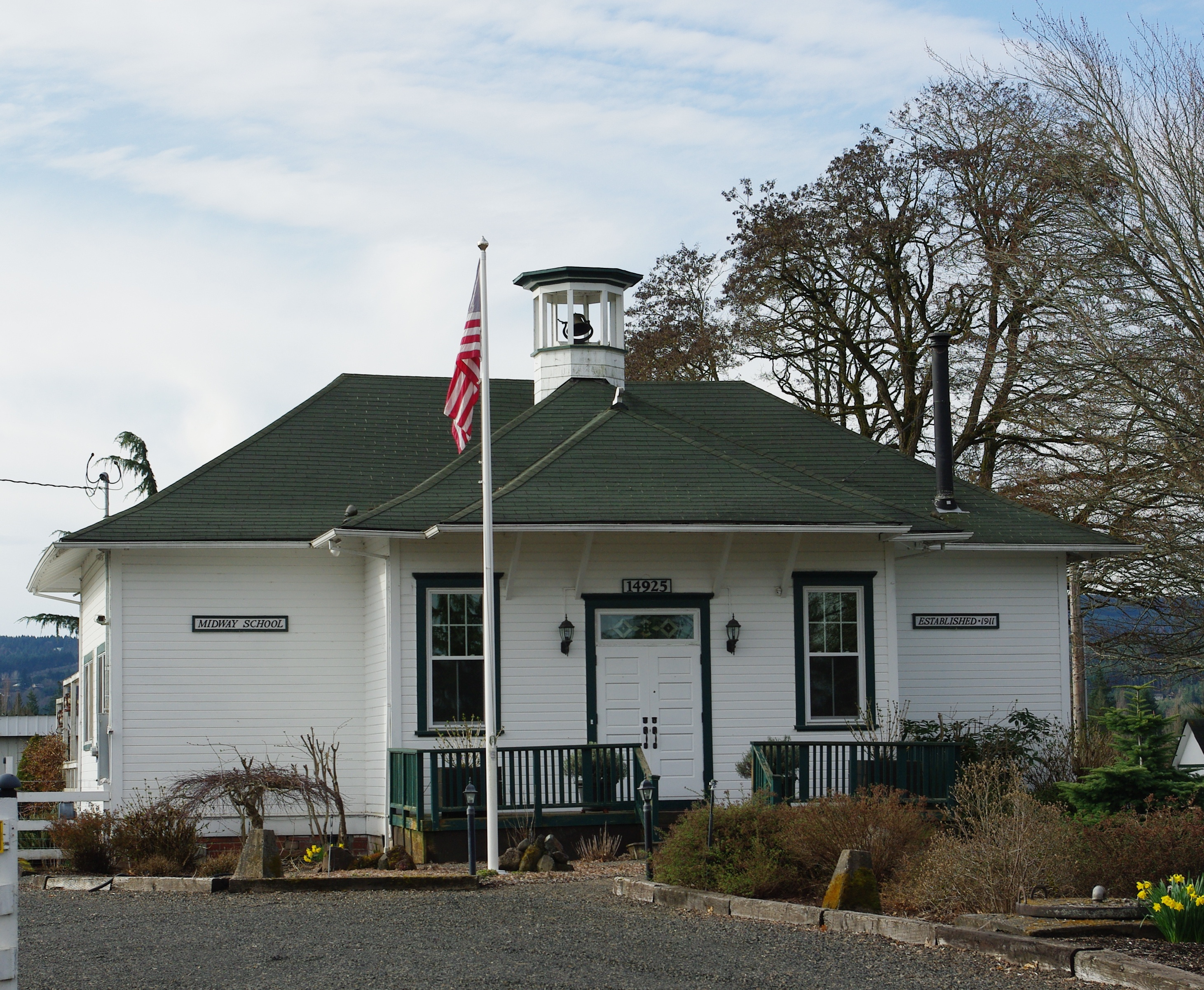
Former school in Midway

Midway is an unincorporated rural community in Washington County, Oregon, United States. It is located on Oregon Route 219 about 2.5 miles (4.0 km) west of Scholls. The area is the halfway point between Hillsboro to the north and Sherwood to the southeast, thus it became known as Midway. Midway has a large plant nursery business, a bar and grill and a rural fire station for Washington County Fire District 2.

Midway's 1912 former one-room schoolhouse, closed in 1946, has been preserved as a private residence. Before being converted into a home, it served as a lodge for the Odd Fellows and Rebekahs. When the school closed, Midway School District merged with the Jacktown, Groner and Kinton school districts to form the Groner School District, which along with other small districts such as Farmington View later merged into the Hillsboro School District.
