= Washington County Fire District 2 =

Operational area
- Country: United States
- State: Oregon
- County: Washington

Agency overview
- Established: 1952
- Dissolved: 2017

Washington County Fire District 2 (WCFD2) was a special-purpose government fire fighting and emergency services district in Washington County on the west side of the Portland metropolitan area of Oregon. Established in 1952, it primarily provided fire and emergency medical services in the central portion of the county surrounding Hillsboro, including the city of North Plains. The District had two fire stations when it was absorbed by Tualatin Valley Fire and Rescue in 2017.

== History ==
The district was established in 1952 as the Hillsboro Rural Fire Protection District. In 1964, the district sued the county to recover $1,281 for fighting a fire at the county's dump, but the district eventually lost at the Oregon Supreme Court. Volunteers built a temporary station in 1966 off Brookwood Avenue on the eastern edge of Hillsboro. In the 1970s the headquarters for the district were in Orenco. By 1973 the name was changed to Washington County Fire District 2.

In 1981, the city approved plans for a new fire station off Brookwood, which became the Drake Lane Station that later became part of the Hillsboro Fire Department (HFD). Neighboring Fire District 1 (now Tualatin Valley Fire and Rescue) gave WCFD2 a used tanker truck in 1984, and at that time WCFD2 was the largest in the county covering 150 square miles (390 km^{2}).

WCFD2 signed a five-year contract with Hillsboro in July 1987 that moved eight paid fire fighters from the district to the HFD and consolidated operations to where both forces responded to emergencies in both territories. The agreement also called for HFD to relocate an engine company from the city's Parkwood Station to the district's Orenco Station, which it did in July 1988 after annexing Tanasbourne. At that time, the district had four fire stations: North Plains, Orenco, Brookwood, and Midway. The next year WCFD2 considered consolidation with the then new Tualatin Valley Fire and Rescue, who maintained the district's equipment. The district sought consolidation, but not a merger, after continuing to lose territory to annexations.

Plans started in 1991 to replace the Midway fire station that was built in the 1950s. WCFD2 built the new station directly south of the prior one, building it over four-years to spread the construction costs over several tax years. The district sent firefighters in August 1994 to help fight wildfires around Leavenworth, Washington, along with other firefighters in the county. WCFD2 had only three paid firefighters as of 1995, with 30 volunteers at each of the two stations. In 1997, WCFD2 contracted with the Hillsboro Fire Department for the latter to provide administrative support for the district, which allowed the district to have four paid fire fighters. Those duties include inspections, education, maintenance, and training. In 2002 District 2 hired Dennis England as fire chief, who remained until October 2012. Upon his retirement, the chief of the Hillsboro department again became the acting chief of WCFD2. In February 2015 the board of directors contracted for the services of an Interim Chief, Jim Stearns, who reports to the district's board.

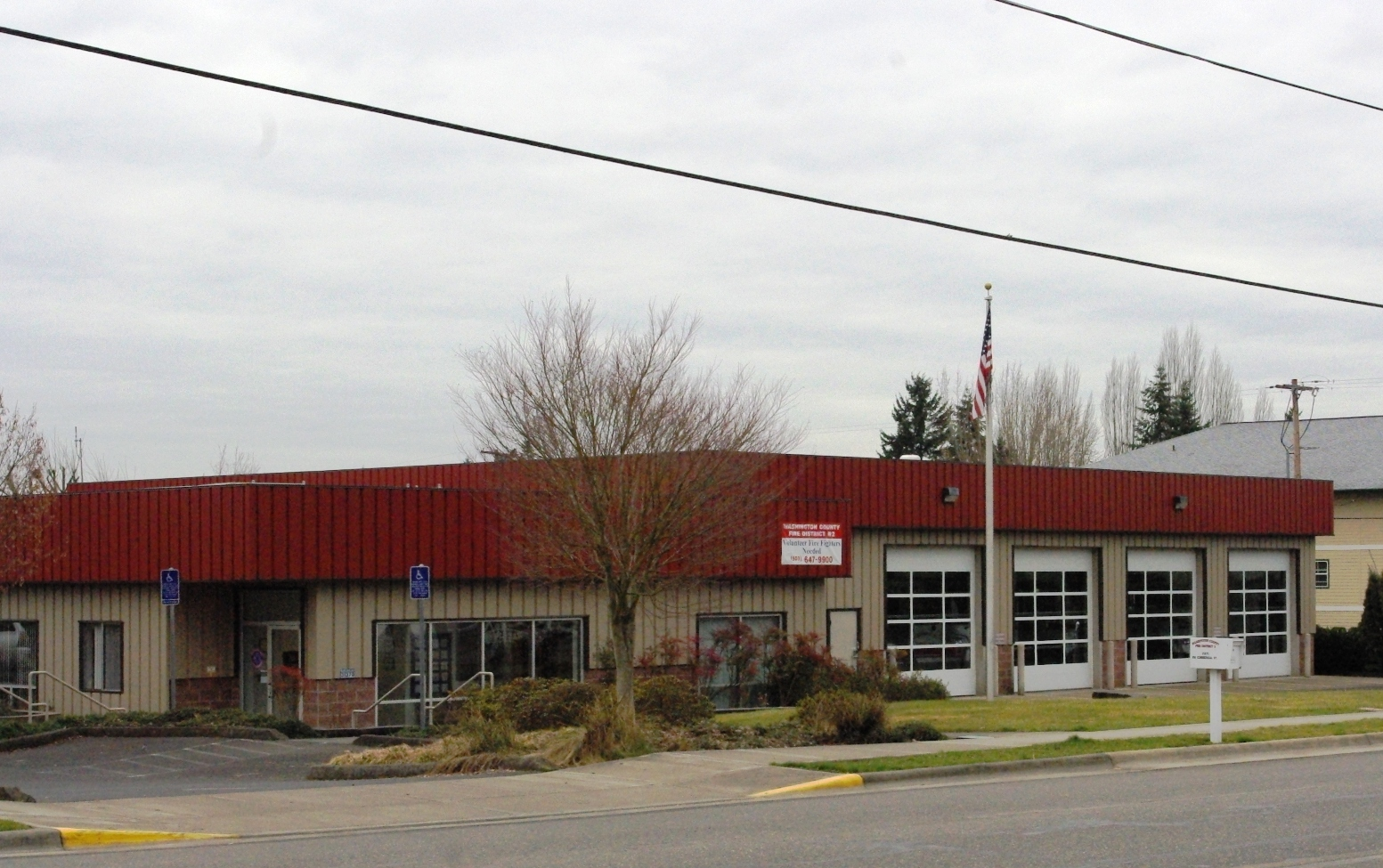
Fire station in North Plains opened in 1998

The district opened a new fire station in North Plains in February 1998 on Northwest Commercial Street paid for by a $750,000 bond passed in 1996. At the time the station had just two paid fire fighters along with 30 volunteers. The old station, built about 1951, had been damaged by the Spring Break Quake in 1993. The new station is 12,000 square feet (1,100 m^{2}) and can house up to eight apparatus in the four equipment bays.

The Midway station handled 497 calls in 2001. In 2002, the district used donations to purchase a thermal-imaging camera. The district was involved in possible merger discussions or coordination in training and purchasing in 2005 with all of the fire departments in the western part of the county. However, none of the departments merged. The district ended its two-year contract with Hillsboro for administrative services in February 2015. On September 1, 2015, a new contract with Tualatin Valley Fire and Rescue (TVF&R) started with that agency taking over administrative functions and talks of a possible annexation of the district into Tualatin Valley Fire and Rescue. On November 8, 2016, voters in the district voted to merge into TVF&R, with the merger completed as of July 1, 2017.

== Apparatus and stations ==
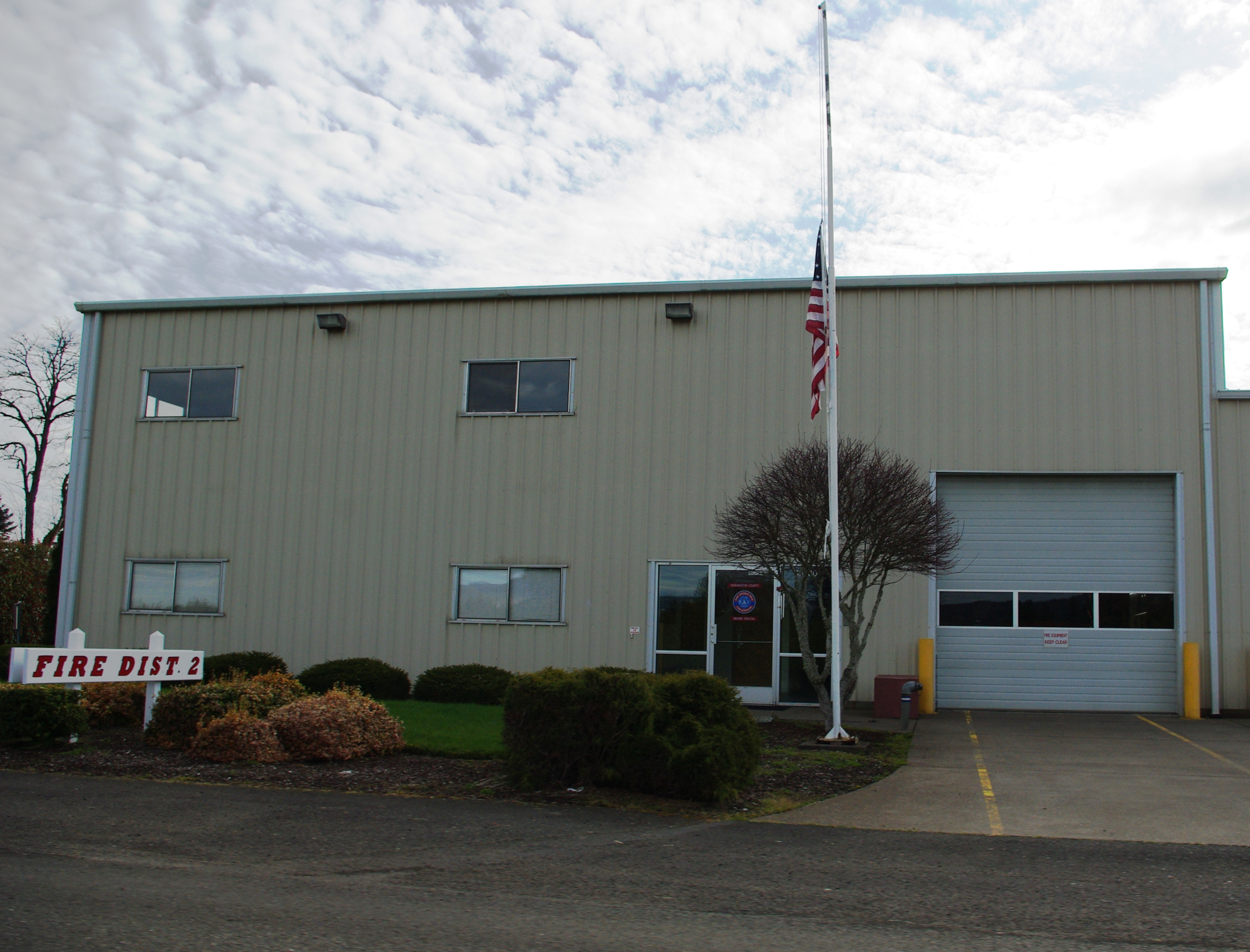
Fire station at Midway

WCFD2 had two fire stations at the time it merged into TVFR. The main station was located in downtown North Plains, which was Station 17 and included administration for the district. Station 19 was located south of Hillsboro in the unincorporated community of Midway along Oregon Route 219.

== Organization ==
The district was governed by a five-person board of directors and led by a fire chief. The district stretched from the Multnomah County line on the north all the way to the border with Yamhill County on the south, passing between Cornelius and Hillsboro. It wrapped around Hillsboro with some unincorporated areas on the east side of Hillsboro in the district. Communities in the 122-square-mile (320 km^{2}) district were North Plains, Helvetia, parts of Rock Creek and West Union, Laurel, Midway, Farmington, and Scholls.

== See also ==
- Firefighting in Oregon
