= Sunset Air Strip =

Sunset Air Strip Airport
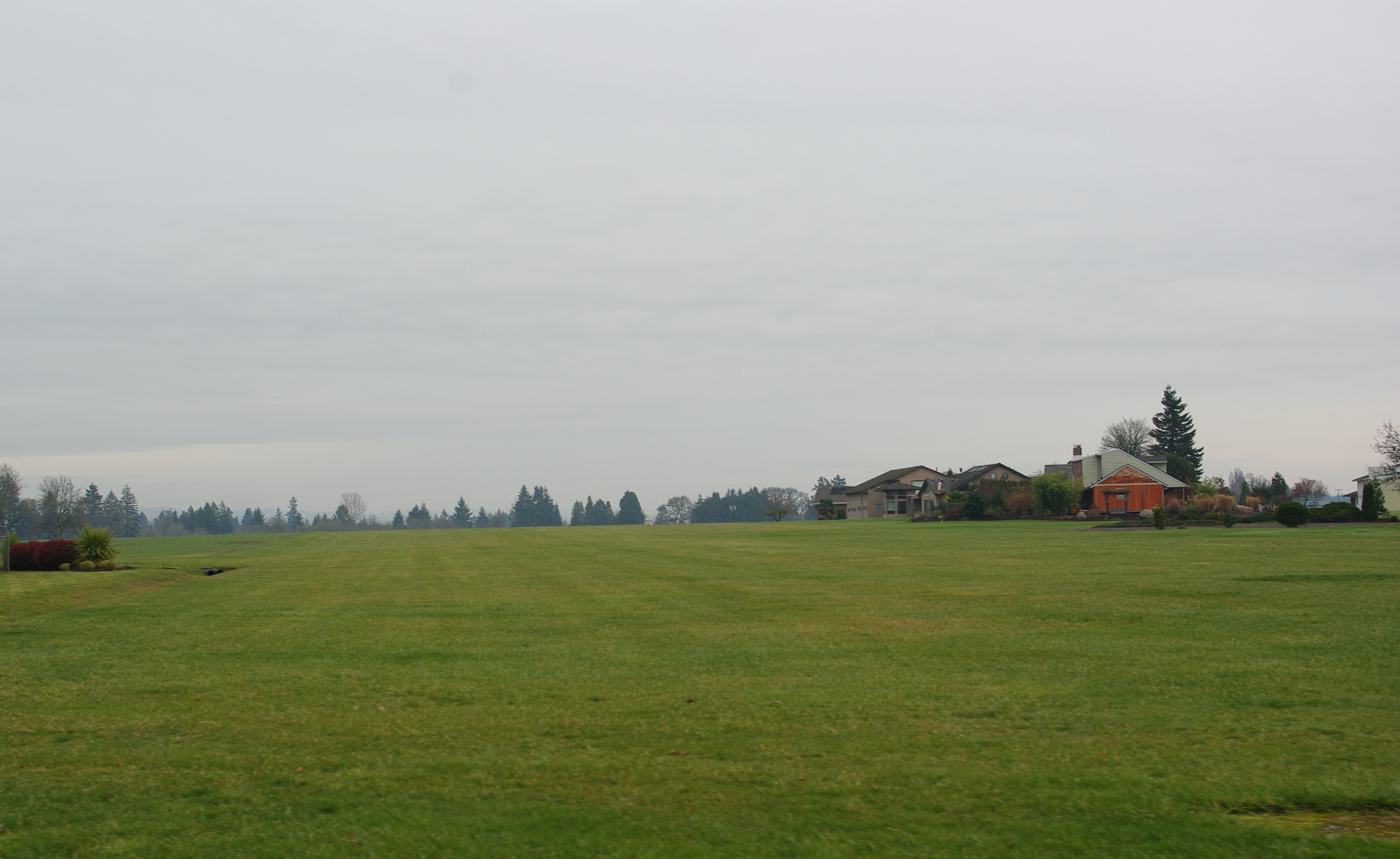
- Landing strip
- IATA: none; ICAO: none; FAA LID: 1OR3

Summary
- Airport type: Private
- Owner: Roth Development
- Location: North Plains, Oregon
- Elevation AMSL: 207 ft / 63 m
- Coordinates: 45°35′29″N 123°00′35″W
- Interactive map of Sunset Air Strip Airport

Runways
Direction	Length		Surface
Direction	ft	m	Surface
06/24	3,050	929	Turf

Sunset Air Strip (FAA LID: 1OR3) is a private airport located one mile southwest of North Plains in Washington County, Oregon, United States. It is managed by Roth Development Corp., which is owned by the neighbors. The Oregon Department of Aviation limits the number of aircraft based at the strip to 50; as of 2013 there were 16, with some of the 17 neighbors having hangars on their property.

== History ==
Sunset Air Strip was built in 1968. Many of the 17 homes around the strip were constructed in the 1970s. In 2003, Washington County created an overlay district covering the strip and adjoining properties that prohibited commercial aviation activities such as flight instruction.

In 2013, it was proposed that an airpark district be created at the landing strip, which would allow for additional homes to be built on adjoining land that could house aircraft. Washington County approved the new district in October 2013, though two groups challenged the decision. In 2017, Garrette Custom Homes completed construction of Falcons Landing (Sunset Orchards Estates 2 HOA), a development of 16 homes on approximately 4-acre sites. Four additional homes were built, also on 4-acre sites, between 2017 and 2023.

Concurrent with the creation of Sunset Airpark, the region experienced considerable aviation growth. Hillsboro Airport (HIO) significantly grew from its main runway to reach 6,600 feet (2,000 m) by 2013, and its annual operations grew by more than a factor of two since 1971. This was due in part to an increase in flight training activity brought about by Hillsboro Aero Academy, a flight school.
