= Witch Hazel, Oregon =

Coordinates: 45.500395°N 122.931214°W

- Neighborhood
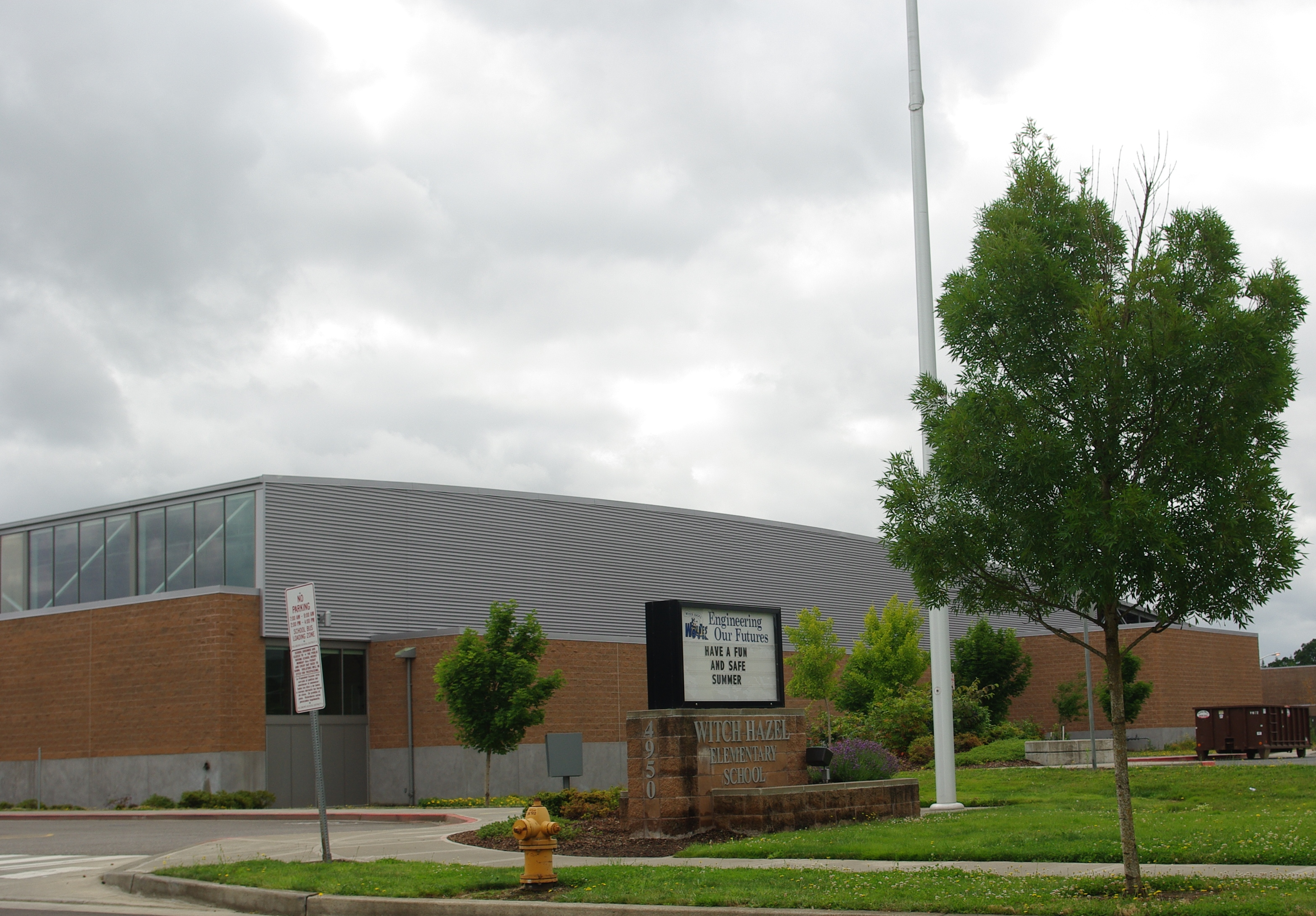
- New Witch Hazel Elementary School
- Interactive map of Witch Hazel, Oregon
- Country: United States
- State: Oregon
- Region: Washington County
- Time zone: UTC-8 (PST)
  - Summer (DST): UTC-7 (PDT)
- Postal code: 97123
- Part of: Hillsboro

Witch Hazel is a neighborhood of the city of Hillsboro in Washington County, Oregon, United States. Formerly an unincorporated community, and considered a separate populated place by the United States Geological Survey, it is on the Tualatin Valley Highway and the Southern Pacific railroad line a mile (1.6 km) west of Reedville.

== History ==
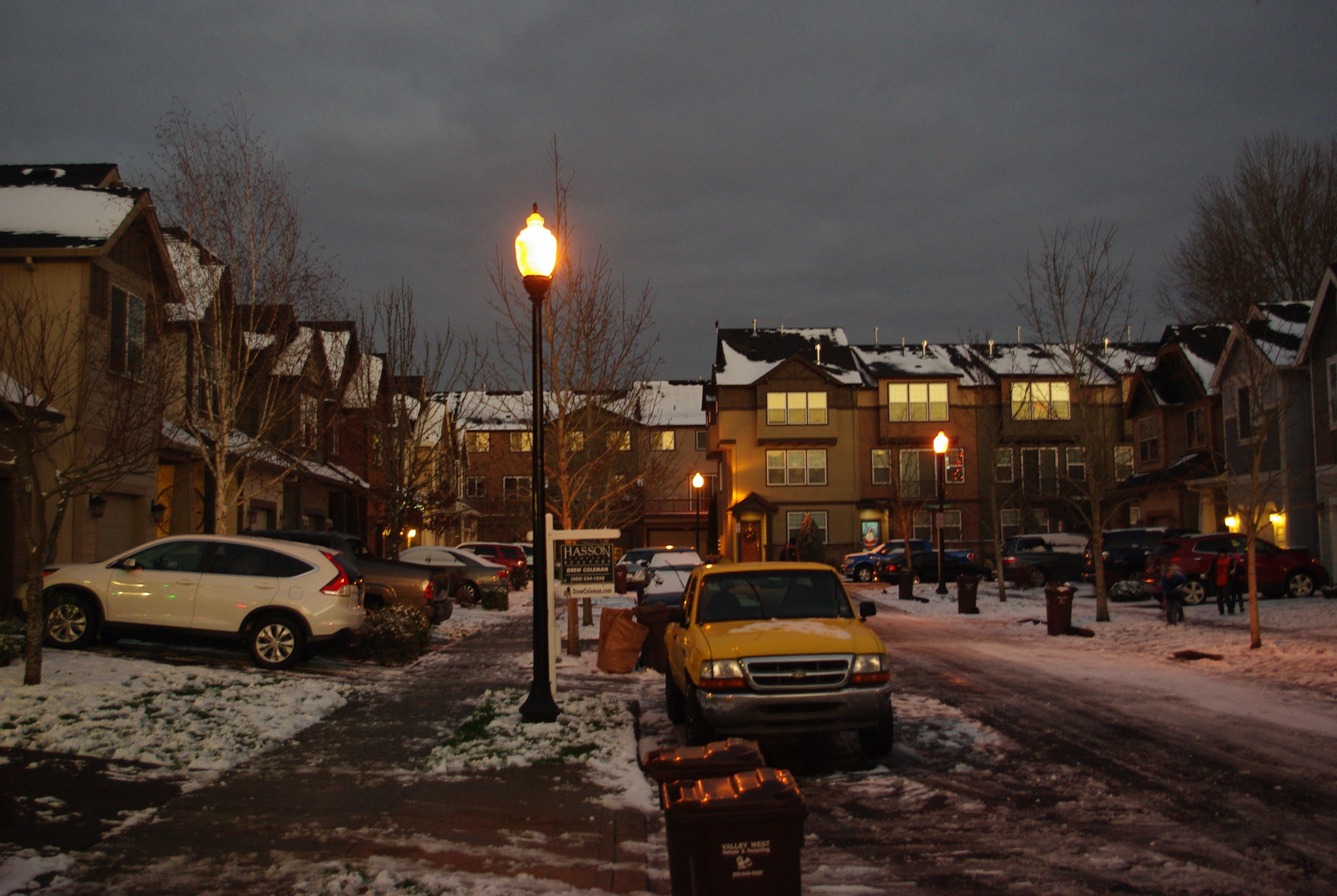
Street in Witch Hazel in December 2016

A small cemetery for the Stewart family dating to 1856 was discovered in Witch Hazel when the land was cleared for development. According to An Illustrated History of the State of Oregon by Harvey K. Hines, the Stewarts lived on "Hazelwitch farm" beginning in 1849. Former Portland mayor Van B. DeLashmutt had a farm there in the 1880s and supposedly named the place for one of his racehorses, however. But according to racehorse authority Governor Oswald West, he had never heard of a racehorse named "Witch Hazel". Mayor DeLashmutt did once own a building at Southwest Front and Madison streets in Portland that he called the "Witch Hazel Building". Apparently he liked the name, although the witch-hazel plant, Hamamelis virginiana, is not native to Oregon.

The Portland, Eugene and Eastern Railway had a station at Witch Hazel with the line later becoming part of the Southern Pacific.

DeLashmutt once had the finest string of racehorses in the Pacific Northwest and his racetrack at Witch Hazel was once one of the best racetracks in America. There were two tracks on his Witch Hazel Farm. The main track was a 1 mile (1.6 km) oval used for races. The second, a half-mile (0.80 km) oval was surrounded by sheds.

Witch Hazel post office was established in 1904 and closed in 1905. About 1921, 400 acres (1.6 km^{2}) in Witch Hazel were subdivided for a development called Witch Hazel Little Farms. The property was divided into 24 tracts of up to 10 acres (40,000 m^{2}), and by November 1921 ten tracts had been sold. By May 1922, the number of tracts had increased to 27, and 24 had been sold. By August 1924, however, the developer was reporting that eight tracts had been sold in the preceding week, and 75 acres (300,000 m^{2}) remained unsold. At that time water, gas, and electricity were all available in the development and construction on three homes had begun. In 1927, dog racing began at a track in Witch Hazel featuring whippets.

In 1999 and 2002, Metro brought 318 acres (1.29 km^{2}) in Witch Hazel into the urban growth boundary. The City of Hillsboro passed a community development plan for the area in February 2004. Once the development is completed, it is estimated that it will house 5,000 people.

== Schools ==
In 1859, a school was built in neighboring Reedville and children from the Witch Hazel area attended school at that one-room schoolhouse. The Witch Hazel School District 79 was formed in 1889 and took its 28 students out of the Reedville School District. The one-school Witch Hazel district merged back into the Reedville district in 1966.

The current Witch Hazel Elementary School is located in the community on Davis Street at Brookwood Avenue, and is part of the Hillsboro School District. A new building was built in 2003 to replace the old structure located on Tualatin Valley Highway at Brookwood Avenue prior to the re-alignment of Brookwood Avenue and Witch Hazel Road at the highway. The reconstruction of those intersections came in late 2006. In 2009, South Meadows Middle School opened adjacent to the elementary school.
