= Hazeldale, Oregon =

Unincorporated community in the state of Oregon, United States

Hazeldale
- Unincorporated community
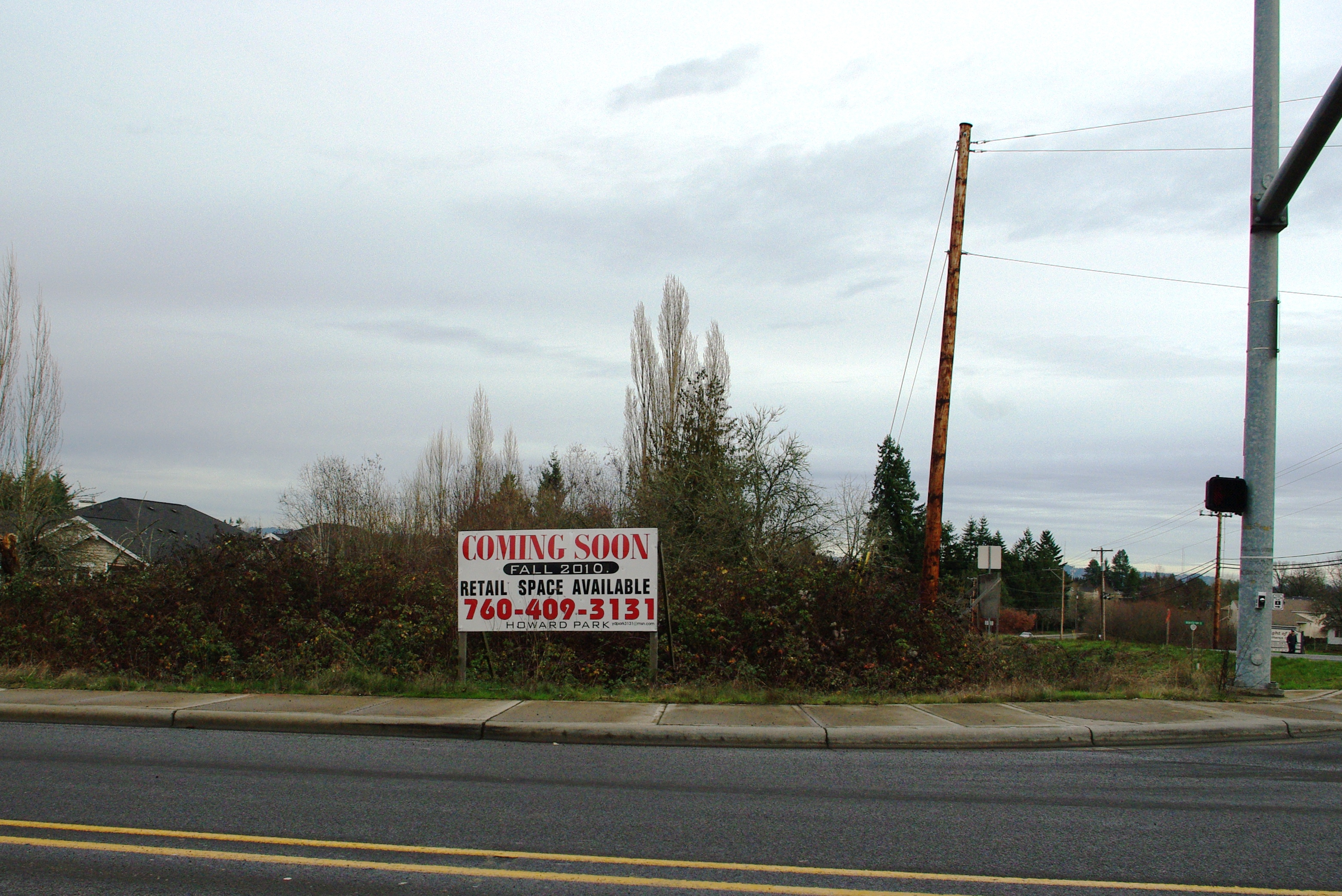
- Location of former store in Hazeldale, 2010

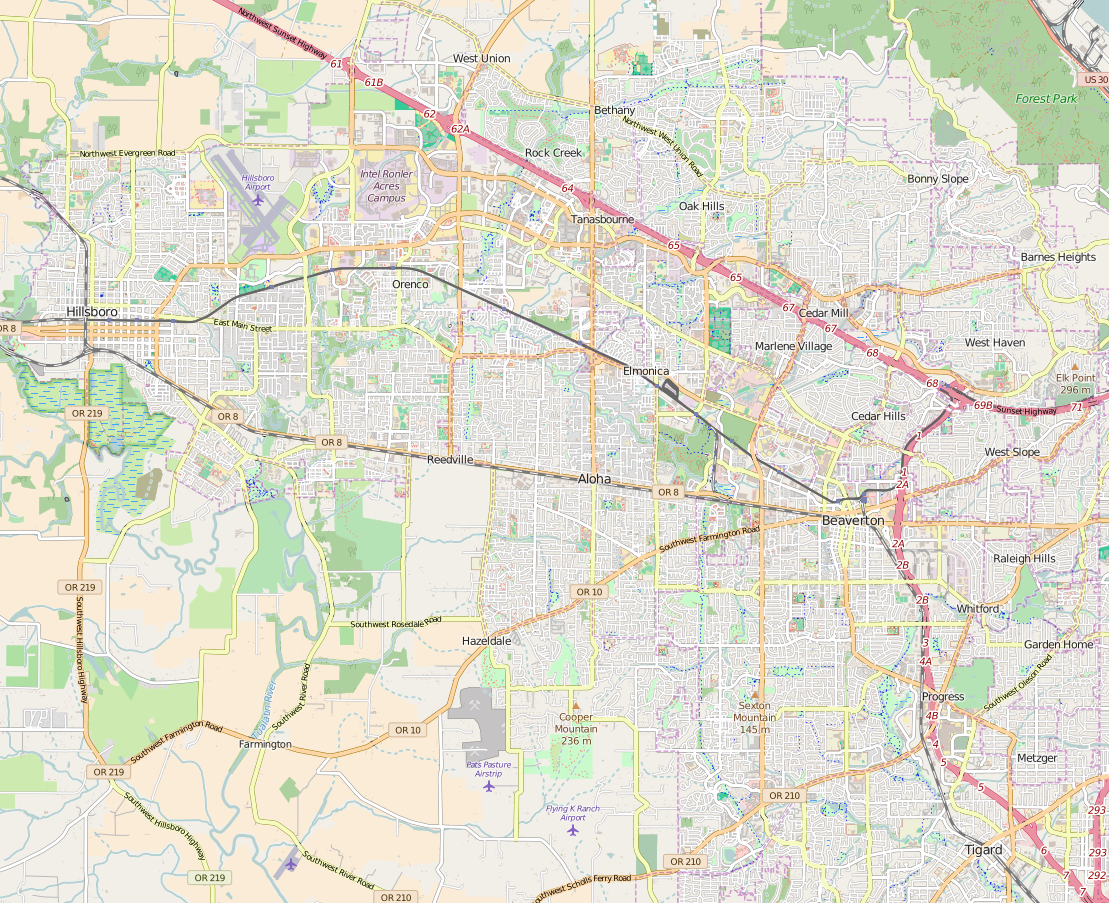
- Location within Washington County, Oregon
- Coordinates: 45°27′59″N 122°53′35″W
- Country: United States
- State: Oregon
- County: Washington
- Elevation: 253 ft (77 m)
- Time zone: UTC-8 (Pacific (PST))
  - Summer (DST): UTC-7 (PDT)
- GNIS feature ID: 1136368

Hazeldale is an unincorporated community in Washington County, Oregon, United States. It is located along Farmington Road south of Reedville and west of Aloha.
