= Charles McKay (Oregon pioneer) =

American fur trapper and settler

Captain Charles Richard McKay Sr.
- Born: February 8, 1808; Brandon House, Manitoba, Canada
- Died: May 27, 1873; Glencoe, Washington, Oregon, United States
- Burial place: Harrison Cemetery, Vadis, Washington County, Oregon, United States
- Citizenship: American
- Occupations: Fur Trapper, Cattle rancher, Butcher
- Known for: Early settlement of Oregon
- Spouse: Letitia (Bird) McKay (married Oct 2, 1827)
- Children: 9
- Father: John Richards McKay

Charles McKay was an American fur trapper of the Hudson Bay Company who came to the Tualatin Valley in Oregon with a group of five other individuals on Christmas day in 1840. The party was formed in an effort to gain a foothold for England in the contested Oregon Territory. The journey was difficult and they made stops at Fort Spokane and originally settled near the town of Dupont before resettling in Oregon. After arriving in Oregon he was one of those alleged to have voted for the creation of a provisional government at what were known as the Champoeg Meetings. He was the founder and first to settle Glencoe, Oregon.

He was married to Letitia Bird, daughter of the governor and former chief factor of the Hudson's Bay Company. Having originally been born in Manitoba, Canada, he became an American citizen in 1851.
