= Farmington, Oregon =

Unincorporated community in the state of Oregon, United States

Farmington
- Unincorporated community
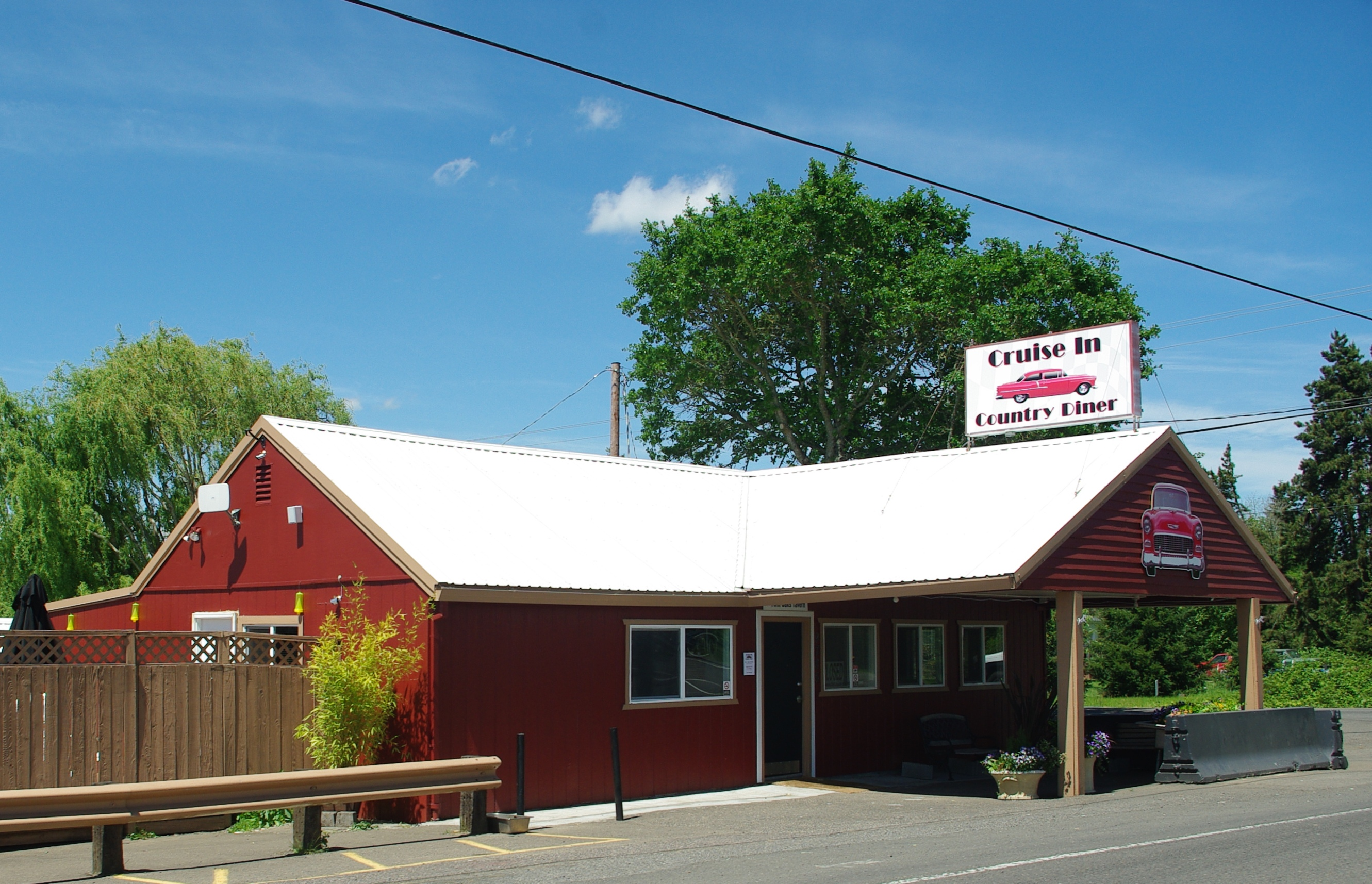
- A former diner at Farmington at intersection of River Road and Farmington Road

- Location within the state of Oregon Farmington (the United States)
- Coordinates: 45°26′56″N 122°56′52″W
- Country: United States
- State: Oregon
- County: Washington
- Elevation: 144 ft (44 m)
- Time zone: UTC-8 (Pacific (PST))
  - Summer (DST): UTC-7 (PDT)
- ZIP code: 97007
- Area codes: 503 and 971

Farmington is an unincorporated community in Washington County, Oregon, United States. It is located on the Tualatin River, a tributary of the Willamette, about eight miles southwest of Beaverton, at the intersection of Oregon Route 10 and River Road. It is about two miles east of the junction of OR 10 with Oregon Route 219. Farmington was one of the earliest settlements in Oregon and was prominent for a time as an important milling and grain-shipping point on the Tualatin when steamships were the principal means of shipping grain along the Willamette River. Farmington was the site of an early Christian Church, founded by 1845 pioneers in Sarah and Philip Harris, who arrived in Oregon via the Meek Cutoff. At that time the locale was called "Bridgeport". Baptisms were in the Tualatin River.

Philip Harris began ferry service, which became known as the Harris-Landess Ferry, across the Tualatin River; he later built a bridge at the same location. Today there is modern bridge there named in his honor. In 1851 there was a post office named Harris Ferry at this locale; Philip Harris was the postmaster.

The community was probably named for Farmington, Connecticut. Farmington post office was established in 1884 and closed in 1904.

The building at the crossroads that currently serves as a restaurant dates to the 1920s; most of the time it housed a tavern but at least once it served as a store. It has been a restaurant since March 2009.

The old Farmington School is about a mile and a half northwest of the crossroads on private property on Rood Bridge Road. It is one of several one-room schools, including the one at Laurel, that merged to become the current Farmington View Elementary School in the Hillsboro School District in 1950. The school is about three miles northwest of Farmington on OR 219. The bell in front of Farmington View originally hung at Laurel School.

Farmington was the birthplace of William G. Hare, Oregon state senator and representative.

== See also ==
- Historic ferries in Oregon
- Stark's Twin Oaks Airpark
- Steamboats of the Willamette River
