= Gales Creek, Oregon =

Unincorporated community in the state of Oregon, United States

Gales Creek
- Unincorporated community
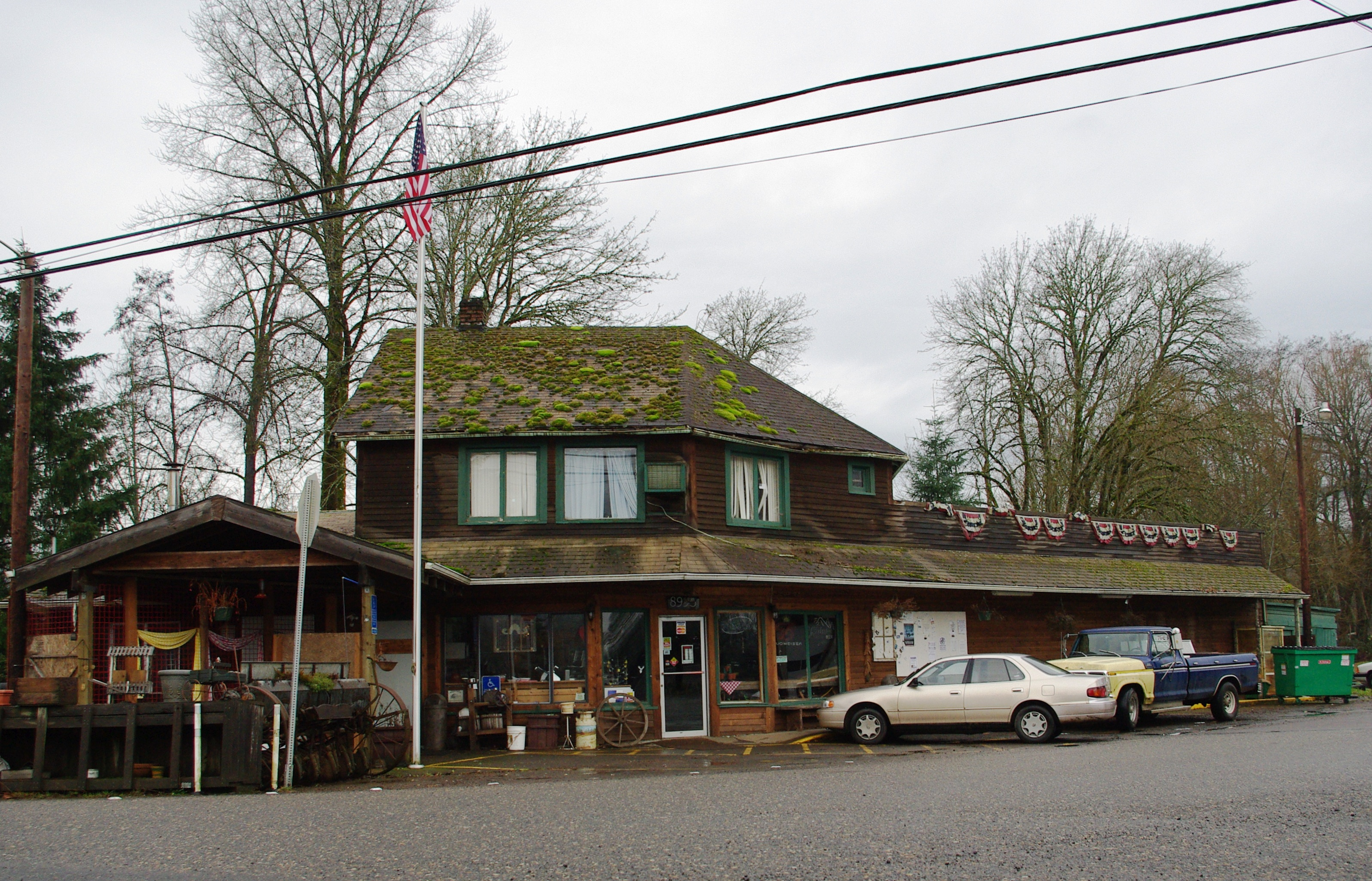
- Gales Creek Store and Post Office (BOTH CLOSED)

- Location within the state of Oregon Gales Creek (the United States)
- Coordinates: 45°35′12″N 123°12′49″W
- Country: United States
- State: Oregon
- County: Washington
- Elevation: 289 ft (88 m)
- Time zone: UTC-8 (Pacific (PST))
  - Summer (DST): UTC-7 (PDT)
- ZIP code: 97117
- Area codes: 503 and 971

Gales Creek is an unincorporated community in Washington County, Oregon, United States on Oregon Route 8 northwest of Forest Grove in the foothills of the Oregon Coast Range.

Gales Creek shares its name with a stream, a tributary of the Tualatin River, that was named for pioneer Joseph Gale, who settled in the area The locale was sometimes called Gales City. Gales Creek post office was established in 1874. In the 19th century the town was the last stagecoach stop on the way to Tillamook. Gales Creek Elementary School was established in 1859 and is served by the Forest Grove School District. The school closed in 2011, and currently acts as a special education treatment facility. The community is part of the Forest Grove Fire and Rescue district and has a fire station.

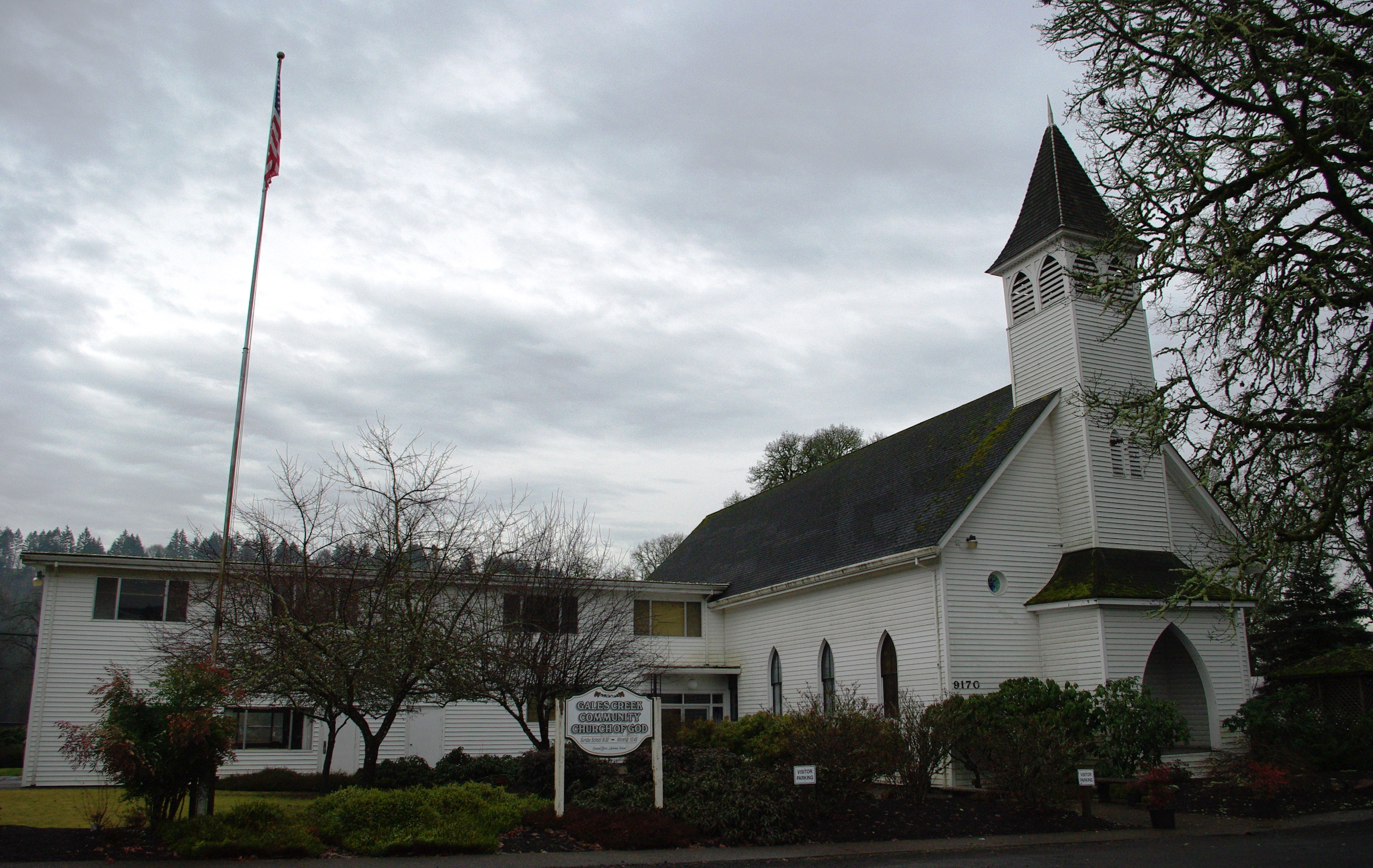
Church in Gales Creek
