= Hillsboro Aero Academy =

American flight training company

Hillsboro Aero Academy (HAA) is a flight training company based in Oregon. Their fleet is approximately 80 airplanes and 20 helicopters, with 150 flight instructors.

== History ==
HAA began as a division of Hillsboro Aviation, the FBO at Hillsboro Airport (HIO). It was eventually split into a standalone business.

In 2014, the school was sold to Renovus Capital Partners and Graycliff Partners and renamed to Hillsboro Aero Academy. It had 74 aircraft at the time and had trained students from 75 countries.

In 2017, a man breached the airport perimeter, donned a mask and attempted to hijack a HAA helicopter at gunpoint. The Hillsboro Police Department then shot and killed him.

In 2022, HAA and Alaska Air Group created Ascend Pilot Academy, a joint venture for training pilots in a cadet program.

In October 2023 a twin engine Piper Seminole crashed into a house in Newberg, Oregon while on a training flight when it stalled and entered a spin. The student and instructor were killed, and the third passenger survived. The family of six, with two inside during the crash, were uninjured but the home was substantially damaged.

== Campuses ==
HAA's primary campus is Hillsboro Airport (HIO).

HAA also operates a Part 141 helicopter flight school under the Hillsboro Heli Academy division, at Troutdale Airport (KTTD). HAA had been training helicopter and fixed-wing pilots at TTD since 2008, and switched to helicopter-only program at the airport in 2019.

HAA opened an Eastern Oregon campus in 2012 at Prineville Airport (PRZ), and moved to Redmond Airport (RDM) in 2017. Most of the students are from China.
