= Stark's Twin Oaks Airpark =

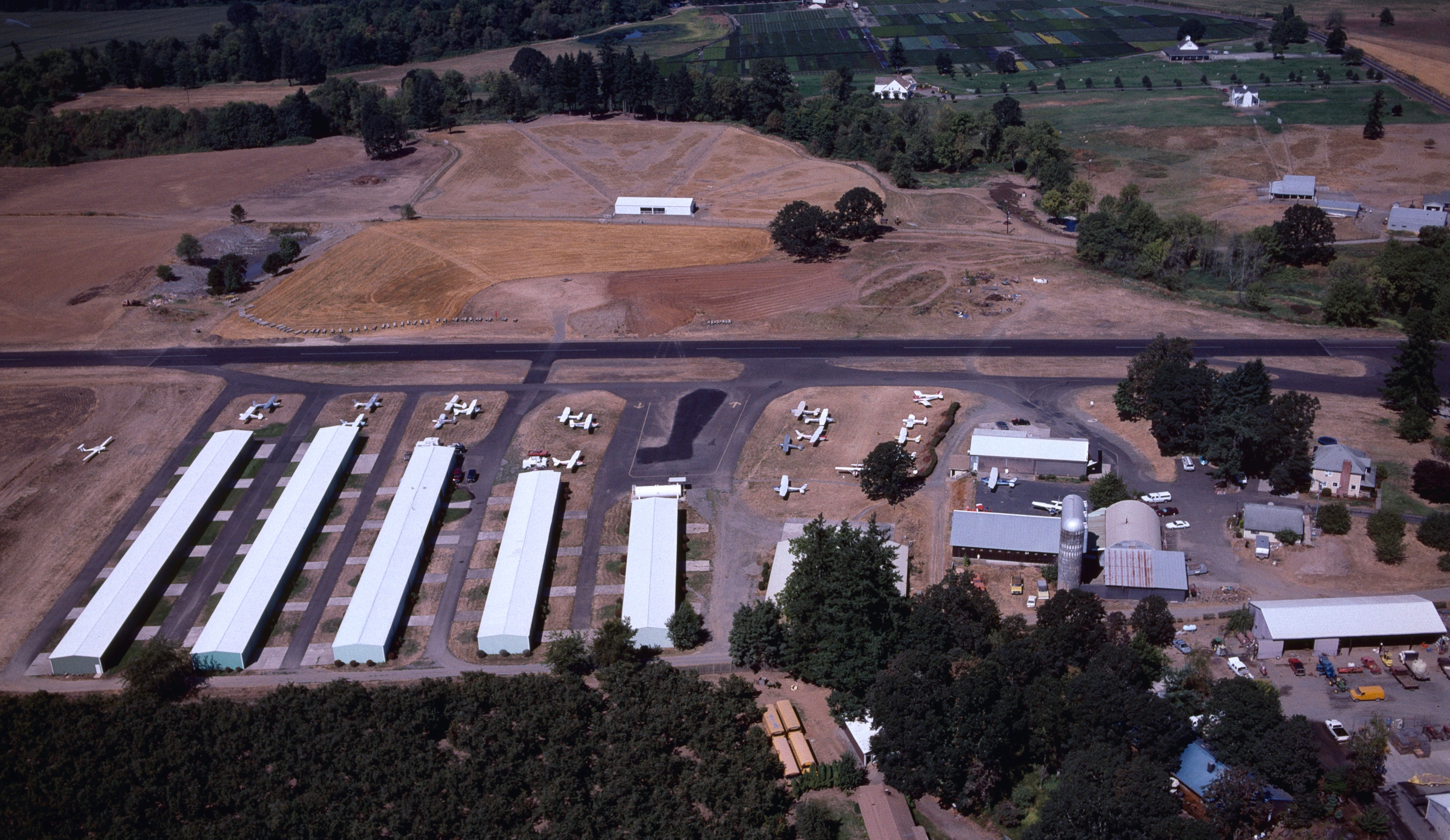
- Stark's Twin Oaks Airpark from the air in 1998. More hangars have been added since then.
- IATA: none; ICAO: none; FAA LID: 7S3

Summary
- Airport type: Public
- Owner: Robert C. & Betty Stark
- Serves: Hillsboro, Oregon
- Elevation AMSL: 170 ft / 52 m
- Coordinates: 45°25′42″N 122°56′32″W
- Website: www.twinoaksairpark.com
- Interactive map of Stark's Twin Oaks Airpark

Runways
Direction	Length		Surface
Direction	ft	m	Surface
2/20	2,465	751	Asphalt

Stark's Twin Oaks Airpark (FAA LID: 7S3) is a privately owned public-use airport located 4 miles (6.4 km) south of the city of Hillsboro in Washington County, Oregon, United States.

== History ==
Herb Stark and his wife Ruth Stark established the airport on an old dairy farm in 1972 after their previous airstrip in Tigard closed in 1969. The original runway was built out of dirt and gravel, and later partially paved with asphalt before the entire runway was paved. Herb and Ruth's son Robert Stark and his wife Betty took over ownership of Twin Oaks, and still owned the airpark as of May 2023.

== Operations ==
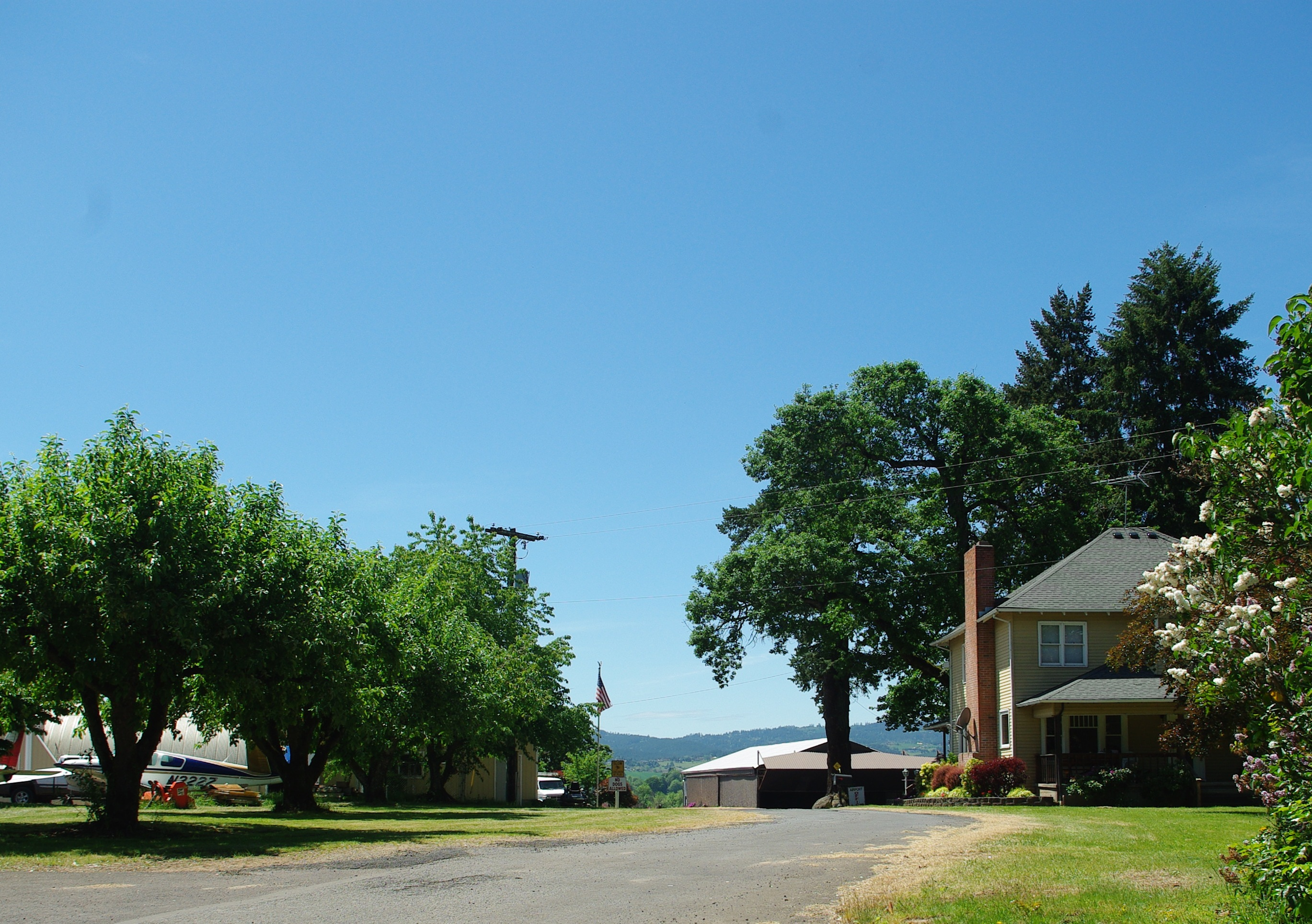
Entrance with office in background

Fuel, aircraft repair, and flight training are available at the airport located along River Road and the Tualatin River. Twin Oaks hosts a fly-in breakfast on the first Saturday of each month, organized by EAA Chapter 105. There are nine hangars, with approximately 115 aircraft stationed at the airport. Twin Oaks sees about 61 flights per day on the single runway. Twin Oaks has a large and varied fleet available for rent.

== Accidents ==
On August 19, 2012, a 1947 Luscombe 8E crashed on landing when it flipped, with no one injured.

A 1965 Piper Aztec crashed during take-off on March 18, 2013, with no injuries reported.

On October 5, 2017, a 1963 Piper 250 Comanche crashed after coming up short on approach, with minor injuries reported.

A Lancair 235 crashed into a field while taking off on June 12, 2026, with the pilot killed.
