= Glencoe, Oregon =

Unincorporated community in the state of Oregon, United States

Glencoe
- Neighborhood
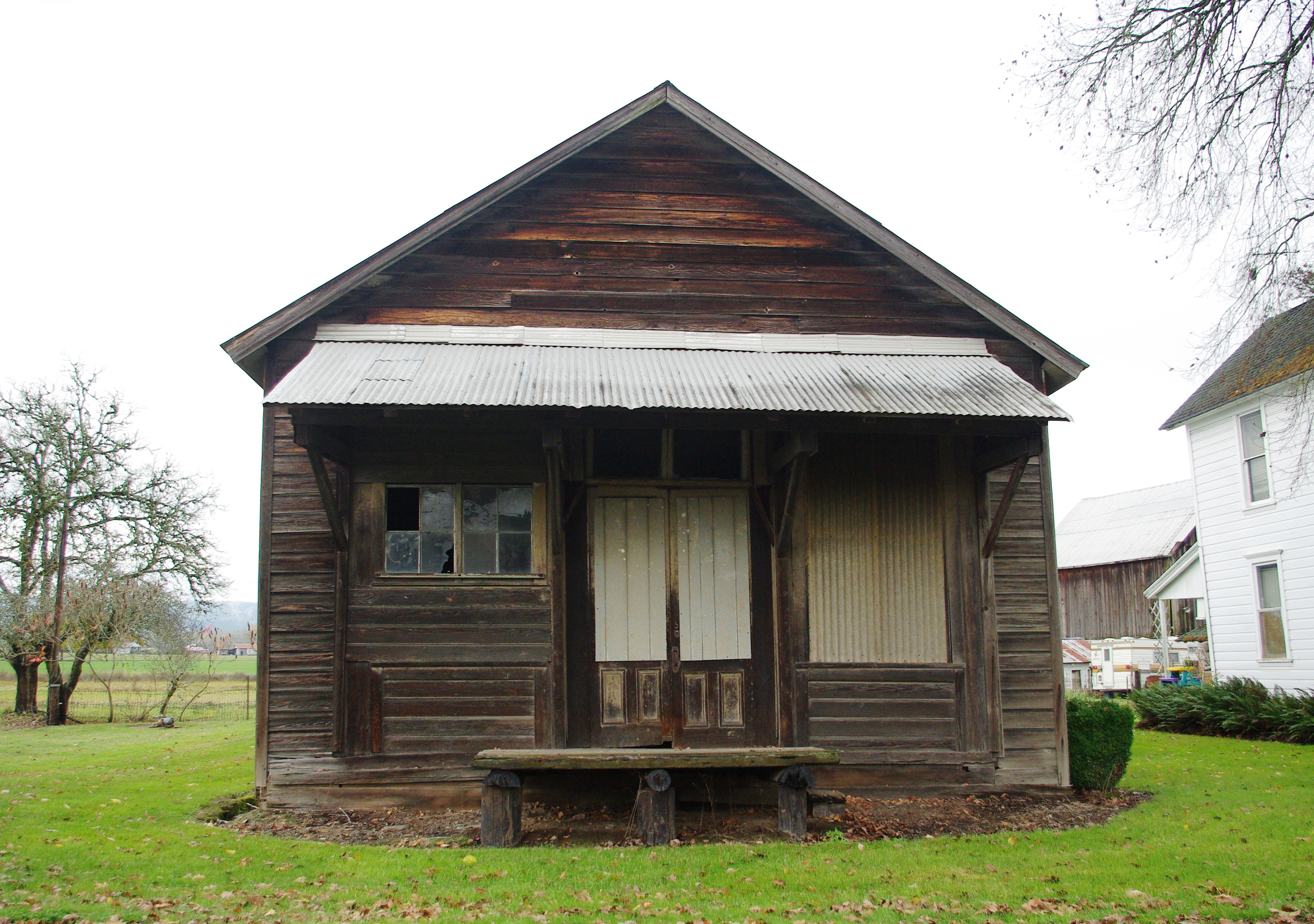
- Old vacant building in Glencoe
- Interactive map of Glencoe
- Coordinates: 45°36′00″N 122°59′31″W
- Country: United States
- State: Oregon
- Region: Washington County
- Time zone: Pacific

Glencoe is a neighborhood and former community in Washington County, Oregon, United States. Founded in 1842, the town, which was north of Hillsboro, died off after 1910 when neighboring North Plains was created to the west. Most of Glencoe is now a part of North Plains. Glencoe gives its name to the road connecting Hillsboro to North Plains, as well as the name of the second high school built in Hillsboro, Glencoe High School.

== History ==
Charles McKay took up a land claim north of what became Hillsboro on the Tualatin Plains in 1842. He was a former employee of the Hudson's Bay Company who voted at the Champoeg Meetings and fought in the Cayuse War. The Métis Canadian immigrant settled there with his wife, Letitia Bird, who was also Métis and four children, naming it Glencoe after Glen Coe in Scotland in honor of his fathers Scottish roots. McKay would build a gristmill on McKay Creek and later a post office was added to the community. The Reverend Harvey Clark was also an early settler of the community before moving to Forest Grove where he helped to found Pacific University.

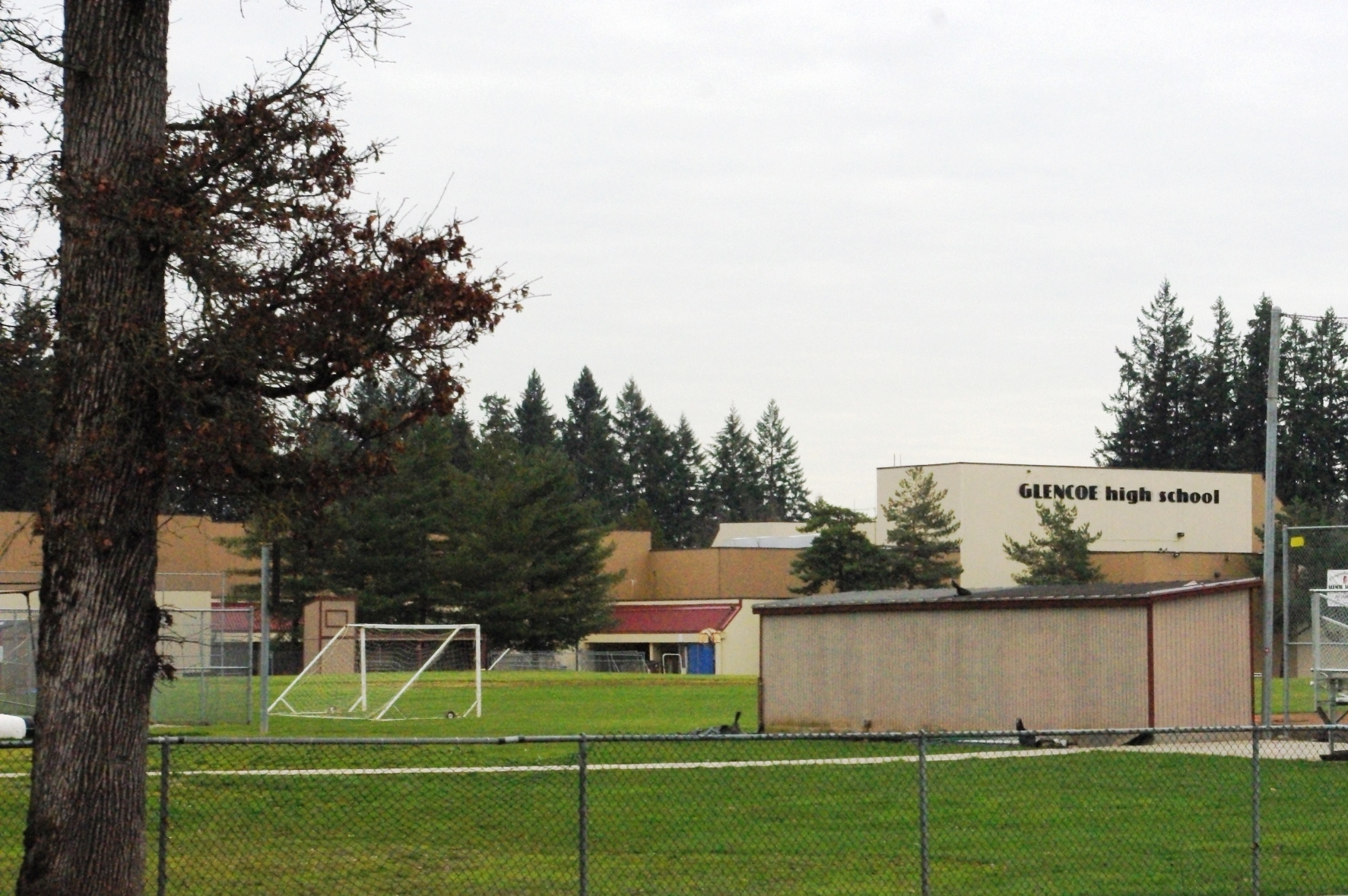
Glencoe High School

William Silvers served as the first postmaster of Glencoe when the post office opened on January 9, 1871, in his store. Glencoe post office was discontinued in 1904. In 1880, during a large windstorm, the bridge over the creek was destroyed and many trees toppled. During the 1880s a Methodist church was built in the community along with a drug store and a lodge for the Knights of Pythias. Other business and buildings included a school, shoemaker, barbershop, and many homes.

A blacksmith shop was also located in Glencoe, with Charles Walter as owner from 1890 until 1960. In 1910, a railroad line to Tillamook, Oregon, was built to the north of Glencoe with much of the community relocating one mile west to the new community of North Plains, and Glencoe slowly dying off. Whole buildings were moved to the new town, with the May Brothers mercantile also relocating to North Plains.

== Currently ==
Glencoe Road is a continuation of Oregon Route 219 and First Avenue in Hillsboro and runs north-south between Hillsboro and North Plains. The neighborhood lies along McKay Creek in the eastern edge of North Plains on Old West Union Road where it meets Glencoe Road north of Highway 26. North Plains is part of the Hillsboro School District, and Glencoe High School is part of the district, but about ten miles south along Glencoe Road.
