= Washington County, Oregon =

County in Oregon, United States

- County
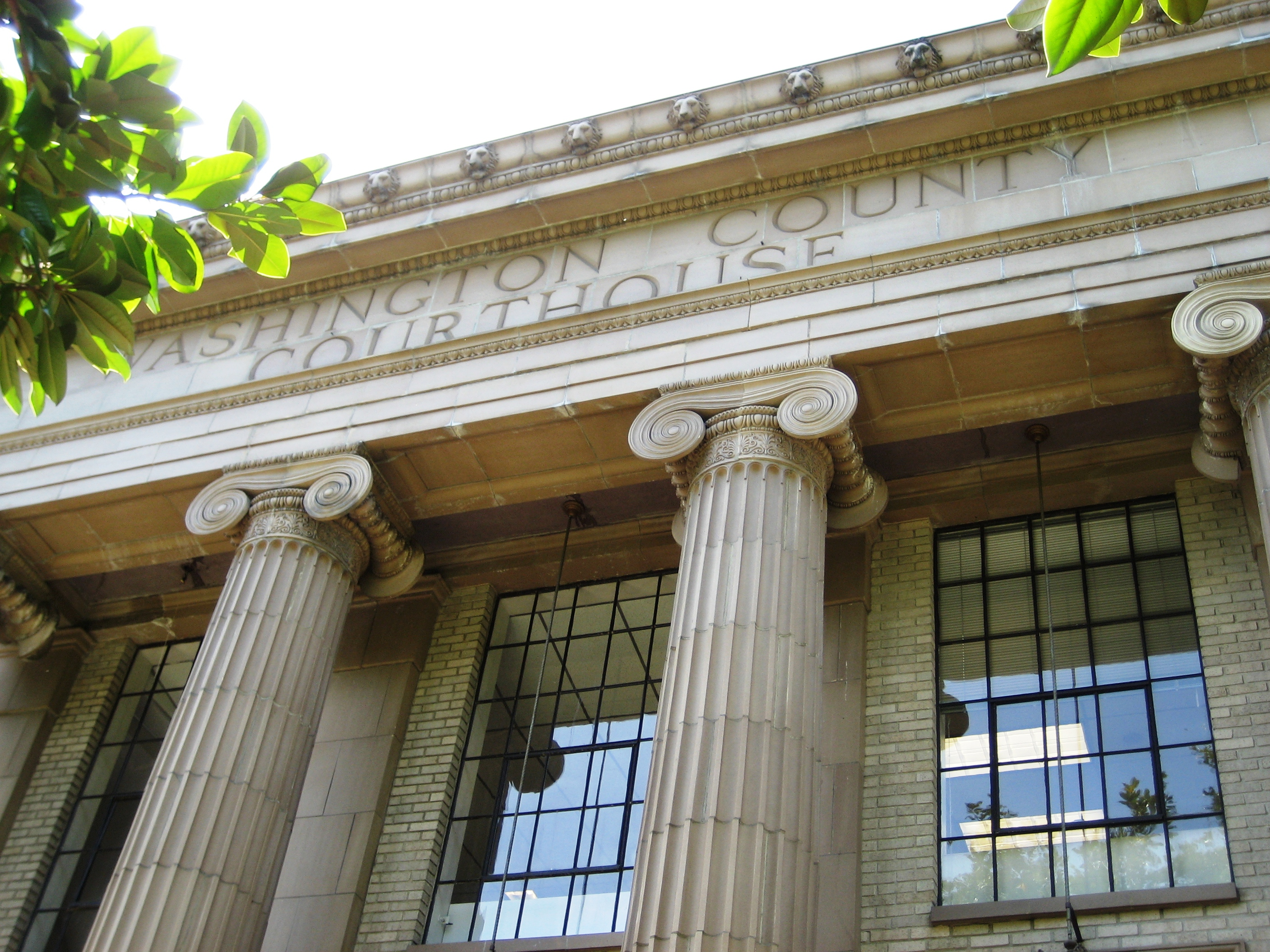
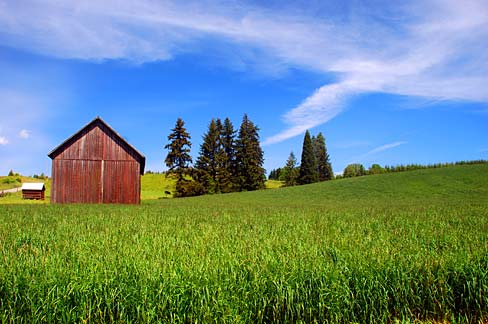
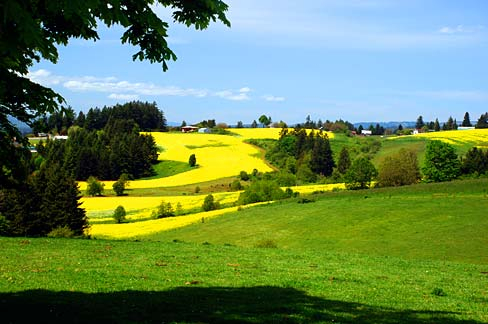
- From top, left to right: Washington County courthouse, Meier Road Barn, a canola field in rural Washington County

- Seal

- Location within the U.S. state of Oregon
- Coordinates: 45°34′N 123°05′W
- Country: United States
- State: Oregon
- Founded: July 5, 1843 (as Twality District)
- Named for: George Washington
- Seat: Hillsboro
- Largest city: Hillsboro

Area
  - Total: 726 sq mi (1,880 km^{2})
  - Land: 724 sq mi (1,880 km^{2})
  - Water: 2.2 sq mi (5.7 km^{2}) 0.3%

Population (2020)
  - Total: 600,372
  - Estimate (2025): 611,708 ▲
  - Density: 829/sq mi (320/km^{2})
- Time zone: UTC−8 (Pacific)
  - Summer (DST): UTC−7 (PDT)
- ZIP Codes: 970XX, 971XX, 972XX
- Area code: 503/971
- Congressional districts: 1st, 6th
- Website: washingtoncountyor.gov

Washington County is one of 36 counties in the U.S. state of Oregon and part of the Portland metropolitan area. The 2020 census recorded the population as 600,372, making it the second most populous county in the state and the most populous "Washington County" in the United States. Hillsboro is the county seat and largest city, while other major cities include Beaverton, Tigard, Cornelius, Banks, Gaston, Sherwood, North Plains, and Forest Grove, the county's oldest city. Originally named Twality when created in 1843, the Oregon Territorial Legislature renamed it for the nation's first president in 1849 and included the entire northwest corner of Oregon before new counties were created in 1854. The Tualatin River and its drainage basin lie almost entirely within the county, which shares its boundaries with the Tualatin Valley. It is bordered on the west and north by the Northern Oregon Coast Range, on the south by the Chehalem Mountains, and on the north and east by the Tualatin Mountains, or West Hills.

Major roads include sections of Interstate 5 and 205, the Sunset Highway, Oregon Route 217, 47, 10, 6 and 8. Public transportation is primarily operated by TriMet and includes buses, the Westside Express Service commuter rail, and MAX Light Rail. Other transportation includes air travel at Hillsboro Airport, private airfields and heliports, and heavy rail cargo on rail lines.

== History ==
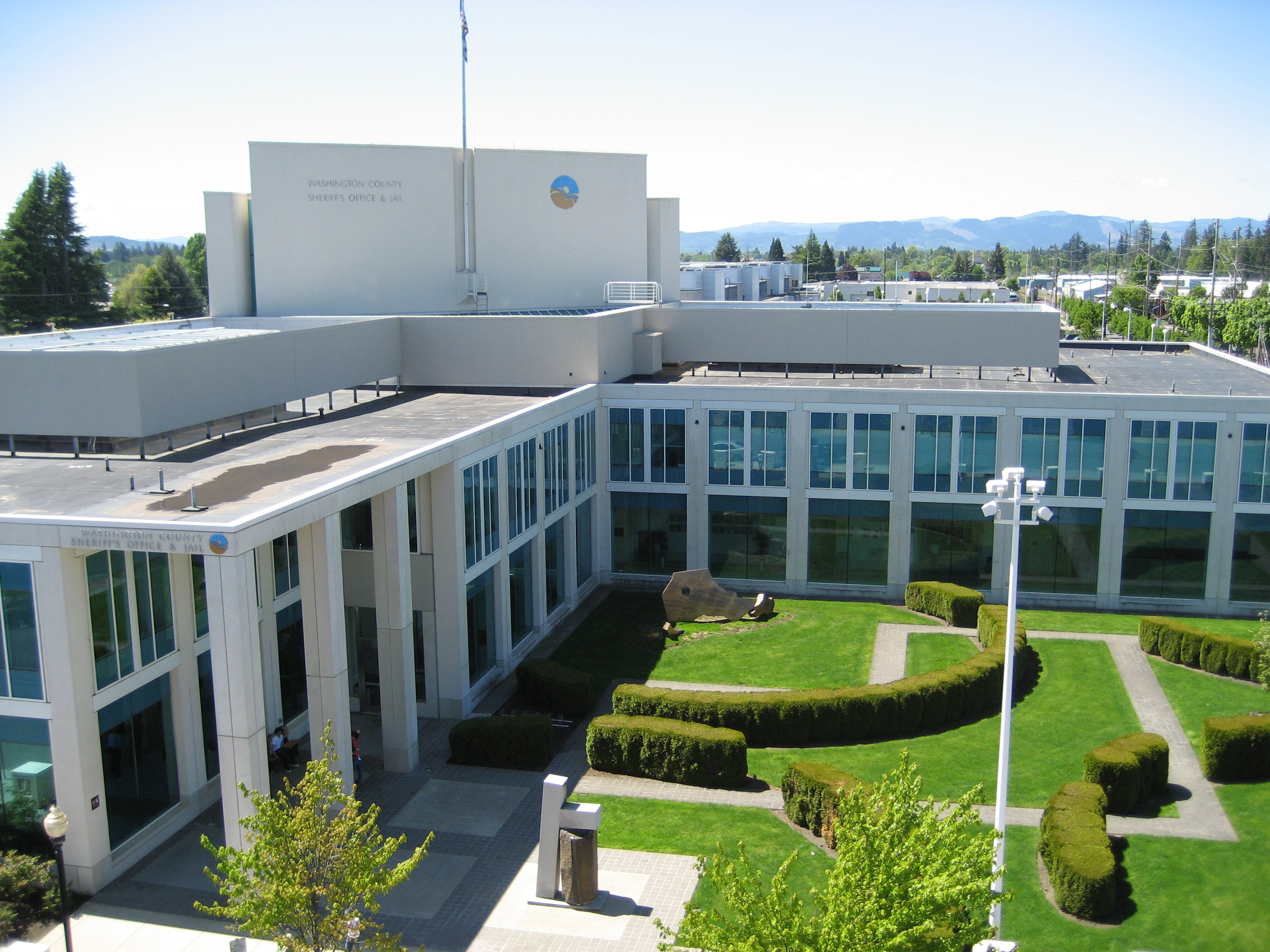
County jail in Hillsboro

The Provisional Legislature of Oregon created the county as Twality District on July 5, 1843. Twality was one of the original four districts of the Provisional Government of Oregon in Oregon Country along with Clackamas, Champooick (later Marion), and Yamhill counties. The administrative area of the county initially spanned from the Pacific Ocean in the west, to the Willamette River in the east, and as far north as the 54°40′N Line in British Columbia until in 1844, when the Vancouver District (later Clark County) was created north of the Columbia River. in 1844, the county lost its western half with the creation of Clatsop County. Columbia, later known as Hillsboro, was selected as the county seat in 1850. Washington County lost significant portions of its original area when Columbia and Multnomah counties were created in 1854. The county area was increased by 160 acres (65 ha) in 2014 when a section of Multnomah County was attached to Washington. The area was returned to Washington County to allow for property development.

The construction of Canyon Road to Beaverton helped Portland to consolidate its position as the primary port of Oregon, and defeat the rival efforts of settlements such as Oregon City and Milwaukie.

In November 2004, the County and the City of Beaverton agreed to a plan where the city would annex both unincorporated residential neighborhoods as well as high-value areas of land. This would result with Cedar Hills, Garden Home, Raleigh Hills, West Slope being incorporated by 2010, and the communities of Aloha, Bethany, and Cedar Mill at some point after that.

Those plans have since been put on hold after Beaverton attempted to annex Nike, Inc.'s World Headquarters, which would have increased Nike's taxes substantially. Nike successfully lobbied the legislature for a law that would prohibit their annexation for 99 years. Since that decision, annexation plans have been halted, and Washington County started urban planning to provide city-level services to the unincorporated urban areas in the county.

== Geography ==
According to the United States Census Bureau, the county has a total area of 726 square miles (1,880 km^{2}), of which 724 square miles (1,880 km^{2}) is land and 2.2 square miles (5.7 km^{2}) (0.3%) is water. It is located approximately 20 miles (32 km) to the west of Portland. The Portland Metro Urban Growth Boundary (UGB) bisects the county. The county's highest point is South Saddle Mountain at 3,464 feet (1,056 m) above sea level in the Northern Oregon Coast Range.

Most of the county is in the Tualatin Valley, formed by the Tualatin Mountains to the east and north, the Chehalem Mountains to the south, and the Northern Oregon Coast Range to the west and north. The Tualatin River, located almost entirely within the county, flows through the Tualatin Plains. The northern and western portions of the county are forested, while the remainder of the county includes urban areas, agricultural lands, and floodplains.

=== Waterways ===
The Tualatin River is the main river in Washington County. Henry Hagg Lake, southwest of Forest Grove, is the largest lake. The Willamette River lies to the east, the Columbia River to the northeast, and the Pacific Ocean to the west of the county.

=== Adjacent counties ===
Map of Washington County

- Clatsop County - northwest
- Columbia County - north
- Multnomah County - east
- Clackamas County - southeast
- Yamhill County - south
- Tillamook County - west

=== Major highways ===
- Interstate 5 (freeway)
- Interstate 205 (freeway)
- U.S. Route 26 (freeway for part)
- Oregon Route 6
- Oregon Route 8
- Oregon Route 10
- Oregon Route 47
- Oregon Route 99W
- Oregon Route 210
- Oregon Route 217 (freeway)
- Oregon Route 219

=== National protected areas ===
- Tualatin River National Wildlife Refuge (part)

=== Aviation ===
- Apple Valley Airport
- Bernard's Airport
- Hillsboro Airport
- Skyport Airport
- Stark's Twin Oaks Airpark
- Sunset Air Strip

== Demographics ==
Historical population
Census	Pop.	Note	%±
1850	2,652		—
1860	2,801		5.6%
1870	4,261		52.1%
1880	7,082		66.2%
1890	11,972		69.0%
1900	14,467		20.8%
1910	21,522		48.8%
1920	26,376		22.6%
1930	30,275		14.8%
1940	39,194		29.5%
1950	61,269		56.3%
1960	92,237		50.5%
1970	157,920		71.2%
1980	245,808		55.7%
1990	311,554		26.7%
2000	445,342		42.9%
2010	529,710		18.9%
2020	600,372		13.3%
2025 (est.)	611,708	▲	1.9%
U.S. Decennial Census; 1790–1960 1900–1990; 1990–2000 2010–2020

=== 2020 census ===
As of the 2020 census, the county had a population of 600,372. Of the residents, 22.6% were under the age of 18 and 14.1% were 65 years of age or older; the median age was 37.2 years. For every 100 females there were 97.2 males, and for every 100 females age 18 and over there were 95.0 males. 94.5% of residents lived in urban areas and 5.5% lived in rural areas.

The racial makeup of the county was 64.2% White, 2.2% Black or African American, 1.0% American Indian and Alaska Native, 11.5% Asian, 0.6% Native Hawaiian and Pacific Islander, 8.7% from some other race, and 11.7% from two or more races. Hispanic or Latino residents of any race comprised 17.9% of the population.

There were 226,799 households in the county, of which 32.7% had children under the age of 18 living with them and 23.9% had a female householder with no spouse or partner present. About 23.7% of all households were made up of individuals and 9.2% had someone living alone who was 65 years of age or older.

There were 236,678 housing units, of which 4.2% were vacant. Among occupied housing units, 59.7% were owner-occupied and 40.3% were renter-occupied. The homeowner vacancy rate was 0.9% and the rental vacancy rate was 5.1%.

Washington County, Oregon – Racial and ethnic composition Note: the US Census treats Hispanic/Latino as an ethnic category. This table excludes Latinos from the racial categories and assigns them to a separate category. Hispanics/Latinos may be of any race.
Race / Ethnicity (NH = Non-Hispanic)	Pop 1980	Pop 1990	Pop 2000	Pop 2010	Pop 2020	% 1980	% 1990	% 2000	% 2010	% 2020
White alone (NH)	230,339	280,239	346,251	369,453	365,232	93.71%	89.95%	77.75%	69.75%	60.83%
Black or African American alone (NH)	1,064	1,986	4,778	8,861	12,763	0.43%	0.64%	1.07%	1.67%	2.13%
Native American or Alaska Native alone (NH)	1,087	1,575	2,335	2,559	2,416	0.44%	0.51%	0.52%	0.48%	0.40%
Asian alone (NH)	5,138	13,190	29,552	45,354	68,430	2.09%	4.23%	6.64%	8.56%	11.40%
Native Hawaiian or Pacific Islander alone (NH)	x	x	1,249	2,269	3,240	x	x	0.28%	0.43%	0.54%
Other race alone (NH)	1,761	163	650	940	3,096	0.72%	0.05%	0.15%	0.18%	0.52%
Mixed race or Multiracial (NH)	x	x	10,792	17,004	37,553	x	x	2.42%	3.21%	6.25%
Hispanic or Latino (any race)	6,419	14,401	49,735	83,270	107,642	2.61%	4.62%	11.17%	15.72%	17.93%
Total	245,808	311,554	445,342	529,710	600,372	100.00%	100.00%	100.00%	100.00%	100.00%

=== 2010 census ===
As of the 2010 census, there were 529,710 people, 200,934 households, and 134,323 families residing in the county. The population density was 731.4 inhabitants per square mile (282.4/km^{2}). There were 212,450 housing units at an average density of 293.3 per square mile (113.2/km^{2}). The racial makeup of the county was 76.6% white, 8.6% Asian, 1.8% black or African American, 0.7% American Indian, 0.5% Pacific islander, 7.5% from other races, and 4.3% from two or more races. Those of Hispanic or Latino origin made up 15.7% of the population. In terms of ancestry, 20.8% were German, 12.4% were English, 12.1% were Irish, and 3.2% were American.

Of the 200,934 households, 36.0% had children under the age of 18 living with them, 52.2% were married couples living together, 10.1% had a female householder with no husband present, 33.2% were non-families, and 25.1% of all households were made up of individuals. The average household size was 2.60 and the average family size was 3.14. The median age was 35.3 years.

The median income for a household in the county was $62,574 and the median income for a family was $76,778. Males had a median income of $54,417 versus $40,254 for females. The per capita income for the county was $30,522. About 6.7% of families and 9.5% of the population were below the poverty line, including 12.5% of those under age 18 and 6.7% of those age 65 or over.

=== 2000 census ===
As of the 2000 census, there were 445,342 people, 169,162 households, and 114,015 families in the county. The population density was 615 people per square mile (237 people/km^{2}). There were 178,913 housing units at an average density of 247 units per square mile (95/km^{2}). The racial makeup of the county was 82.19% White, 1.15% Black or African American, 0.65% Native American, 6.68% Asian, 0.30% Pacific Islander, 5.86% from other races, and 3.17% from two or more races. 11.17% of the population were Hispanic or Latino of any race. 17.2% were of German, 9.9% English, 8.2% Irish, and 6.7% American ancestry. 81.7% spoke only English at home, while 9.6% spoke Spanish and 1.2% Vietnamese.

There were 169,162 households, out of which 35.60% had children under the age of 18 living with them, 54.50% were married couples living together, 9.00% had a female householder with no husband present, and 32.60% were non-families. 24.70% of all households were made up of individuals, and 6.70% had someone living alone who was 65 years of age or older. The average household size was 2.61 and the average family size was 3.14.

The county population contained 26.90% under the age of 18, 9.30% from 18 to 24, 34.10% from 25 to 44, 20.90% from 45 to 64, and 8.80% who were 65 years of age or older. The median age was 33 years. For every 100 females, there were 99.10 males. For every 100 females age 18 and over, there were 97.00 males.

The median income for a household in the county was $52,122, and the median income for a family was $61,499. Males had a median income of $43,304 versus $31,074 for females. The per capita income for the county was $24,969. About 4.90% of families and 7.40% of the population were below the poverty line, including 8.30% of those under age 18 and 5.30% of those age 65 or over.

== Government ==
The county is governed by an elected board of five commissioners. The county is divided into four commissioner districts. One commissioner sits for each district, and the fifth commissioner is at-large and is the chair of the board.

== Politics ==
United States presidential election results for Washington County, Oregon
Year	Republican		Democratic		Third party(ies)	
Year	No.	%	No.	%	No.	%
1880	880	58.86%	578	38.66%	37	2.47%
1884	946	51.22%	766	41.47%	135	7.31%
1888	1,249	57.93%	838	38.87%	69	3.20%
1892	1,587	53.27%	293	9.84%	1,099	36.89%
1896	2,082	56.15%	1,566	42.23%	60	1.62%
1900	1,655	56.14%	1,114	37.79%	179	6.07%
1904	2,296	73.19%	492	15.68%	349	11.13%
1908	2,319	61.96%	1,153	30.80%	271	7.24%
1912	1,261	27.07%	1,429	30.67%	1,969	42.26%
1916	4,888	56.16%	3,363	38.64%	452	5.19%
1920	4,947	64.74%	2,262	29.60%	432	5.65%
1924	4,203	45.98%	2,103	23.01%	2,835	31.01%
1928	6,162	62.37%	3,544	35.87%	173	1.75%
1932	4,201	36.30%	6,824	58.96%	548	4.74%
1936	4,148	30.47%	8,641	63.48%	823	6.05%
1940	8,367	48.92%	8,626	50.44%	110	0.64%
1944	9,362	50.13%	9,110	48.78%	205	1.10%
1948	11,455	53.06%	9,424	43.65%	710	3.29%
1952	20,250	64.11%	11,191	35.43%	143	0.45%
1956	22,001	61.07%	14,027	38.93%	0	0.00%
1960	25,415	58.85%	17,736	41.07%	35	0.08%
1964	20,813	41.48%	29,081	57.95%	287	0.57%
1968	34,105	56.99%	22,943	38.34%	2,794	4.67%
1972	43,958	58.43%	27,890	37.07%	3,390	4.51%
1976	52,376	57.80%	34,847	38.46%	3,388	3.74%
1980	57,165	51.34%	37,915	34.05%	16,275	14.62%
1984	75,877	62.76%	44,602	36.89%	417	0.34%
1988	67,018	51.87%	59,837	46.31%	2,356	1.82%
1992	57,146	34.18%	67,528	40.39%	42,521	25.43%
1996	65,221	40.83%	76,619	47.96%	17,915	11.21%
2000	86,091	46.29%	90,662	48.75%	9,221	4.96%
2004	107,223	46.36%	121,140	52.37%	2,945	1.27%
2008	89,185	37.69%	141,544	59.82%	5,903	2.49%
2012	93,974	39.65%	135,291	57.08%	7,758	3.27%
2016	83,197	30.90%	153,251	56.92%	32,784	12.18%
2020	99,073	30.93%	209,940	65.54%	11,313	3.53%
2024	92,590	31.08%	193,013	64.78%	12,346	4.14%

Like all of the Yankee-influenced Willamette Valley and Oregon Coast, Washington County was in its pre-Depression history strongly Republican. After Oregon achieved statehood in 1859, Washington County voted for the Republican presidential nominee in every presidential election from 1860 to 1928, except in the 1912 presidential election when the county supported Progressive Party candidate and former Republican president Theodore Roosevelt. In 1932, Franklin D. Roosevelt became the first-ever Democrat to win the Washington County vote, and he repeated this success in 1936 and 1940. Between 1944 and 1988, Washington County was never won by a Democrat except in Lyndon B. Johnson's landslide victory in 1964. As recently as 1976, Washington County was the second-most Republican county in the state behind Malheur County in southeast Oregon. Gerald Ford's 17,529-vote margin of victory in the county was decisive in narrowly carrying Oregon during that year's presidential election; it was almost 10 times Ford's statewide margin of 1,713 votes.

Since the 1990s, the increasing drift of the Republican Party nationally towards the South and evangelicalism, along with urbanization, has resulted in Washington County shifting towards the Democratic Party. No Republican presidential candidate has carried Washington County since George H. W. Bush did so in 1988. In 2004, John Kerry became the first Democrat to win a majority of the county's vote since LBJ. The county swung hard to Barack Obama in 2008, who carried it with almost 60 percent of the vote and a 22-point margin over John McCain, the strongest showing for a Democrat in the county since Roosevelt. Obama won the county almost as easily in 2012, and since then, Hillary Clinton, Joe Biden, and Kamala Harris all prevailed the county by over twenty percentage points. The last Republican to win a statewide election in Washington County was Gordon H. Smith in the 2002 Senate contest. In the 2008 Senatorial election, Democrat Jeff Merkley won 48.8 percent of the county's vote (111,367) while Republican incumbent Smith won 46.5 percent (106,114), but no subsequent Republican Senate candidate has won 40 percent of the county's votes. In the 2020 presidential election, Biden hit 65.5% of the county's vote, the highest ever for a Democratic presidential nominee.

== Economy ==
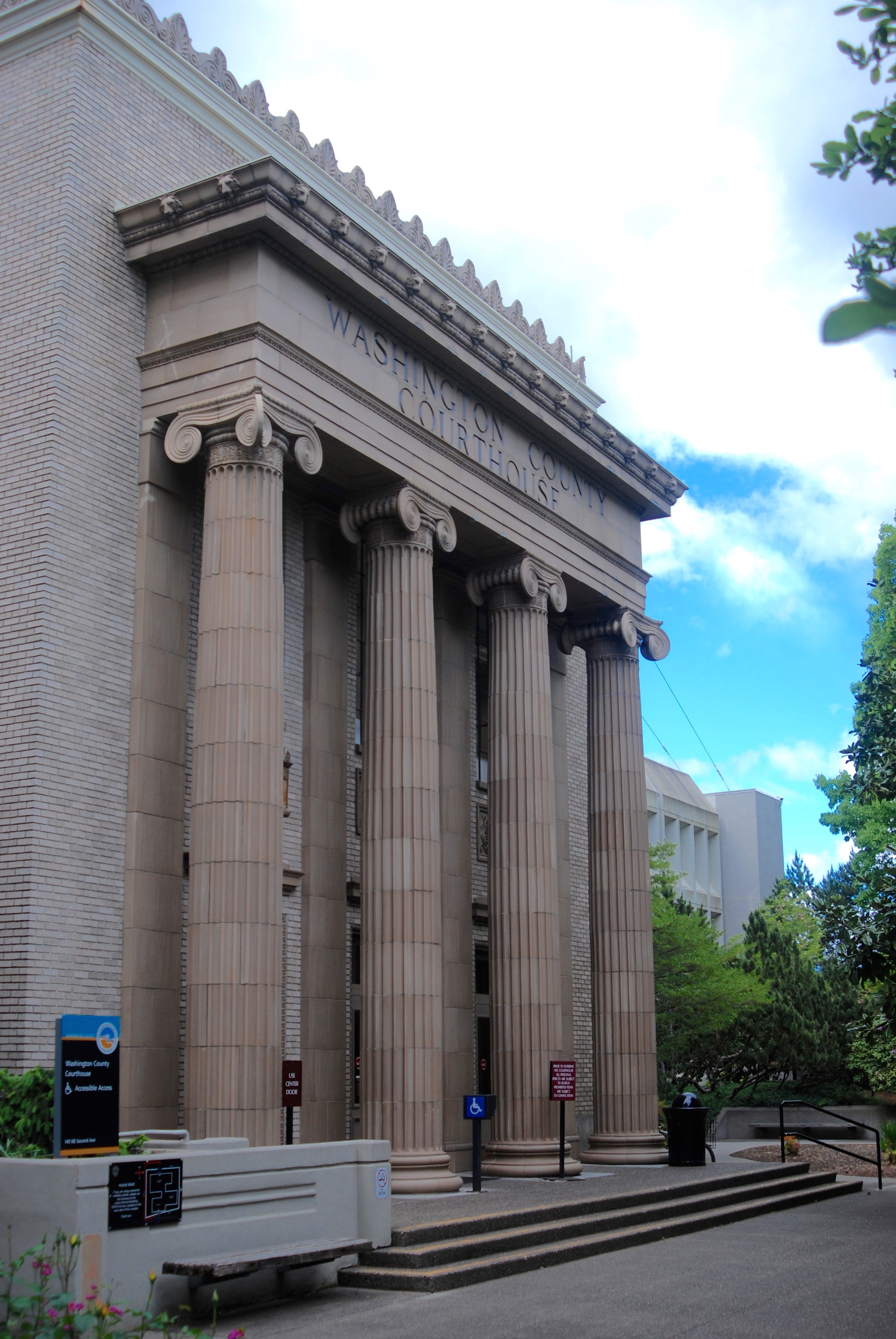
The Washington County Courthouse in Hillsboro

Washington County is centered on a fertile plain that attracted farmers before the first wagon trains. In 1997, orchards covered 8,403 acres (34.01 km^{2}) of the county's lands and 1,163 acres (4.71 km^{2}) were devoted to vineyards. Agriculture is still a major industry in Washington County, as are lumber, manufacturing, and food processing.

The development of a large electronics industry during the 1980s and 1990s is the dominating factor of the county economy, and contributing to the creation of Oregon's Silicon Forest. California-based Intel, Oregon's largest private-sector employer, has its largest concentration of employees in the county, mainly in Hillsboro. Other technology companies include Electro Scientific Industries, FEI Company, Qorvo, Amazon, Tektronix, SolarWorld, Planar Systems, and EPSON.

Nike, one of two Fortune 500 corporations based in Oregon, has its headquarters in Washington County. Until it was acquired by IBM, Sequent Computer Systems was headquartered near Nike. Other companies with headquarters in Washington County include optical instruments manufacturer Leupold & Stevens, Columbia Sportswear, and Reser's Fine Foods.

== Communities ==
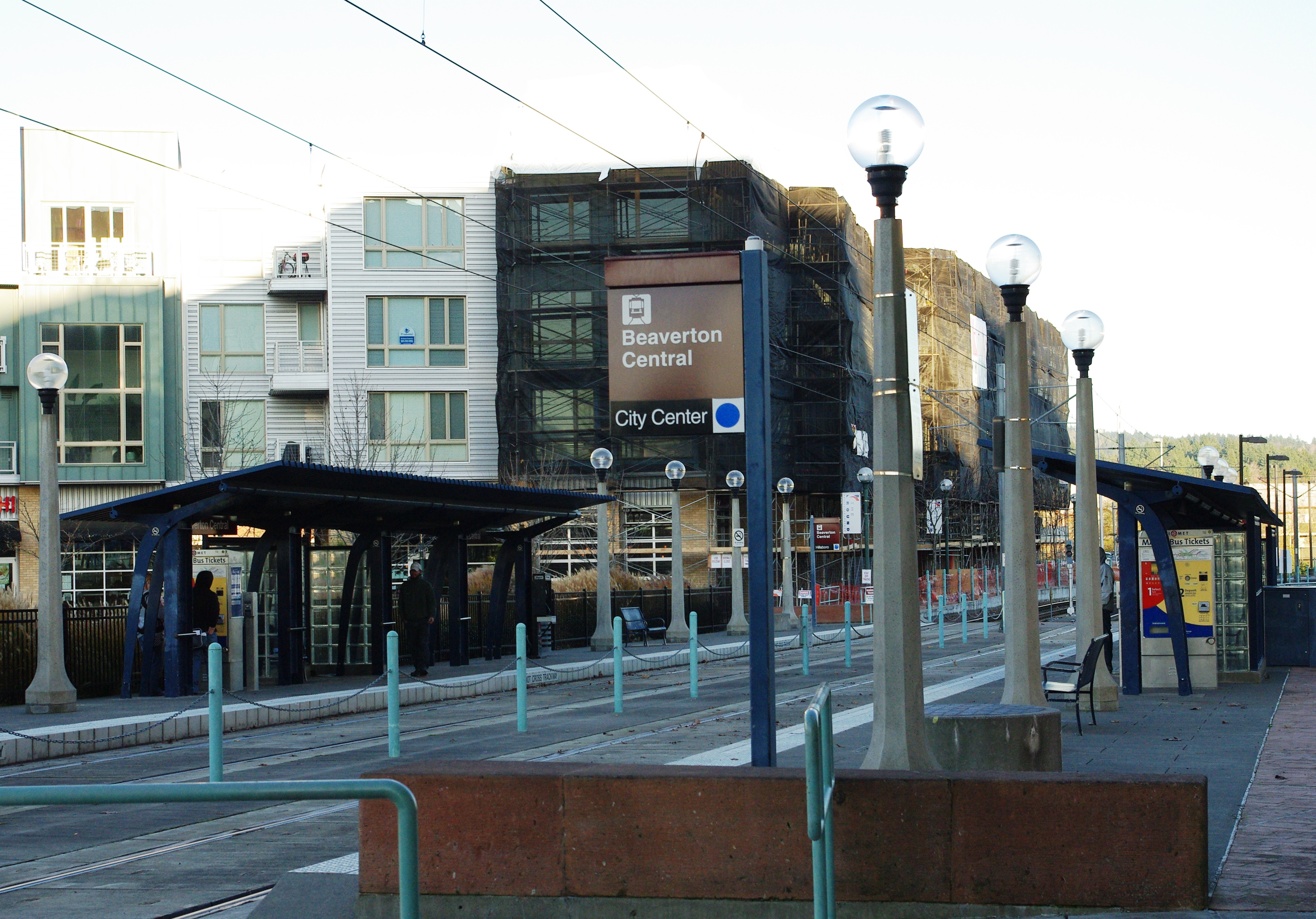
Part of The Round in Beaverton, with the Beaverton Central MAX light rail station in center.

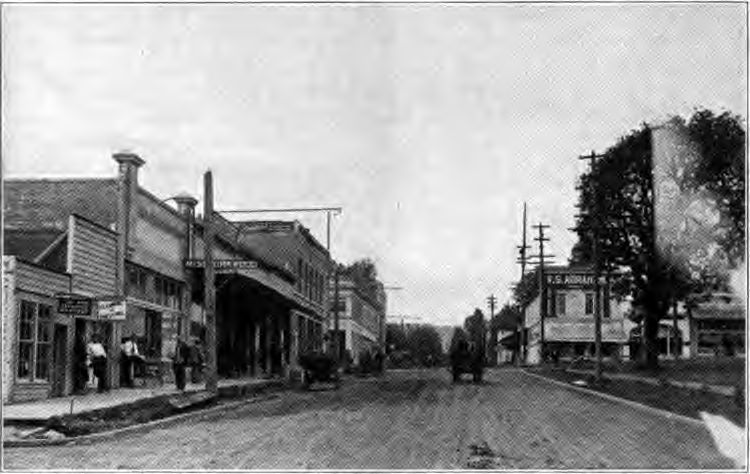
Downtown Forest Grove in 1920

=== Cities ===
City	2020 population	2010 population	2000 population	1990 population	Incorporated	Notes
Banks	1,837	1,777	1,286	563	1921	
Beaverton	97,494	89,803	76,129	53,310	1893	
Cornelius	12,694	11,869	9,652	6,148	1893	
Durham	1,944	1,351	1,382	748	1966	
Forest Grove	26,225	21,083	17,708	13,559	1872	
Gaston	676	637	600	563	1914	
Hillsboro	106,447	91,611	70,187	37,520	1876	County seat
King City	5,184	3,111	1,949	2,060	1966	
Lake Oswego	40,731	36,619	35,278	30,576	1910	Small portion, most in Clackamas County
North Plains	3,441	1,947	1,605	972	1963	
Portland	652,503	583,776	529,121	437,319	1851	Small portion, most in Multnomah County
Rivergrove	545	289	324	294	1971	Small portion, most in Clackamas County
Sherwood	20,450	18,194	11,791	3,093	1893	
Tigard	54,539	48,035	41,223	29,344	1961	
Tualatin	27,942	26,054	22,791	15,013	1913	
Wilsonville	26,664	19,509	13,991	7,106	1969	Small portion, most in Clackamas County

=== Census-designated places ===
- Aloha
- Bethany
- Bull Mountain
- Cedar Hills
- Cedar Mill
- Cherry Grove
- Dilley
- Garden Home–Whitford
- Marlene Village
- Metzger
- Oak Hills
- Raleigh Hills
- Rockcreek
- West Haven-Sylvan
- West Slope

=== Unincorporated communities ===
- Bacona
- Balm Grove
- Bendemeer
- Blooming
- Bonita
- Bonny Slope
- Bowers Junction
- Bradley Corner
- Buck Heaven
- Buxton
- Carnation
- Carpenter Creek
- Chehalem
- Chapman
- Christie
- Cochran
- Connell
- Cooper Mountain
- Detour
- Dilley
- Dixie
- Elmonica
- Farmington
- Fern Hill
- Fir
- Gales Creek
- Glencoe
- Glenwood
- Greenburg
- Greenville
- Groveland
- Hayward
- Hazeldale
- Helvetia
- Hillside
- Huber
- Iowa Hill
- Jacktown
- Kansas City
- Kinton
- Laurel
- Laurelwood
- Leisy
- Manning
- Meacham Corner
- Middleton
- Midway
- Mountaindale
- Mountain Home
- Mountainside
- Mulloy
- Murrayhill
- Nasoma
- Norwood
- Patton
- Reedville
- Roy
- Rock Creek
- Rosedale
- Scefflin
- Scholls
- Scofield
- Seghers
- Sexton Mountain
- Shady Brook
- Six Corners
- Somerset West
- Sorrento Ridge
- Spring Hill
- Stafford
- Stimson Mill
- Strassel
- Tanasbourne
- Thatcher
- Tillamook Junction
- Timber
- Tobias
- Tonquin
- Tophill
- Trece
- Vadis
- Valle Vista
- Verboort
- Votaw
- Watts
- West Haven
- West Union
- Wilkesboro

=== Former communities ===
- Centerville
- Cipole
- Cochran
- Davies Junction
- Forest Dale
- Hiteon
- Newton
- Onion Flats
- Orenco
- Peak
- Progress
- Quatama
- Sewell
- Snooseville Corner
- Timbuktu
- Tualatin Plains
- Westimber
- Witch Hazel

== Education ==
School districts include:

- Banks School District 13
- Beaverton School District 48J
- Forest Grove School District 15
- Gaston School District 511J
- Hillsboro School District 1J
- Newberg School District 29J
- Portland School District 1J
- Scappoose School District 1J
- Sherwood School District 88J
- Tigard-Tualatin School District 23J
- Vernonia School District 47J
- West Linn School District 3J

It is in the boundary of Portland Community College.

== See also ==
- National Register of Historic Places listings in Washington County, Oregon
- Washington County Museum
- L. L. "Stub" Stewart State Park
- Ki-a-Kuts Falls
- Washington County Jail
- Washington County Courthouse
