= Kinton, Oregon =

Unincorporated community in the state of Oregon, United States

Kinton
- Unincorporated community
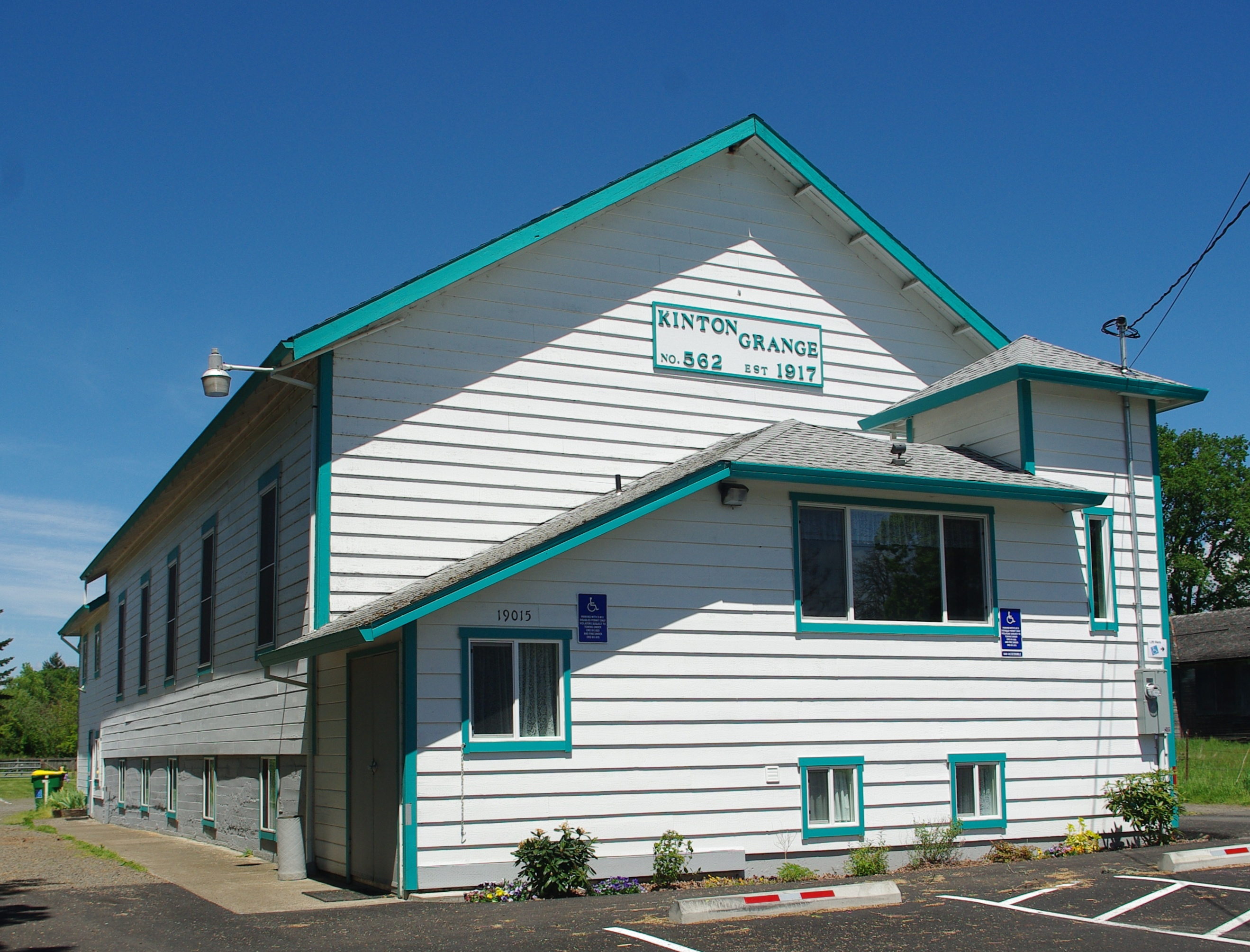
- The Kinton Grange hall

- Location within the state of Oregon Kinton (the United States)
- Coordinates: 45°25′23″N 122°52′40″W
- Country: United States
- State: Oregon
- County: Washington
- Time zone: UTC-8 (Pacific (PST))
  - Summer (DST): UTC-7 (PDT)
- ZIP code: 97007
- Area codes: 503 and 971

Kinton is an unincorporated community in Washington County, Oregon, United States. It is located near the northern shore of the Tualatin River, near the intersection of Oregon Route 210 and River Road, a major county arterial that runs northwest towards Hillsboro. Kinton is located approximately eight miles north of Newberg, six miles southwest of Beaverton, and seven miles southeast of Hillsboro. The community was once the site of a ferry (the Scholls Ferry) crossing the Tualatin River between Kinton and nearby Scholls. While the ferry has long since been replaced with a bridge, OR 210 is still known locally as Scholls Ferry Road. Kinton is in Oregon's wine country, with several notable wineries in the area.

== History ==
Kinton was named for Peter Kindt, a pioneer who took up a donation land claim nearby. Kinton had its own post office from 1894–1903. Today Kinton has a Beaverton mailing address.

Quoted from Ghosttowns.com

"Twenty million years ago, lava flows from eastern Oregon snaked down the Columbia River and deposited a bed of basalt lava in the area known today as Washington County. During the last ice age, the region was engulfed repeatedly by the raging Missoula floods, which deposited rich silt and topsoil.

A few thousand years later, the Donation Land Claim Act of 1850, enacted by congress to encourage settlement in Oregon Territory, prompted a surge of immigration to the new Territory via the Oregon Trail. (This law is the precursor to the Homestead Act.) Before the Act expired in 1855, a total of 7,437 patents were issued, one of them to a Peter Kindt. Mr. Kindt’s Donation Land claim lay near the banks of the Tualatin River, and the town of Kinton was named after this early pioneer.

Kinton was fortunate to be situated near the Ferry that Peter Scholl built around 1848 across the Tualatin River. Mr. Scholl operated the ferry for many years, later establishing a toll bridge. (That covered bridge existed at least until the 1920s, but is now gone.) The road that runs through Kinton, down to the community of Scholls, is still called Scholl’s Ferry Road.

"Kinton had a post office from 1894 to 1903. Aside from an old a schoolhouse, the administrative buildings and stores seem to be gone. However, it may be that such buildings reside hidden on private property, out of sight from the road. Today Scholl’s Ferry Road (HW 210) and SW River Road are important highways, very scenic and pleasant to drive. Historic houses and barns may be seen from the road. Be sure to visit Scholls, a semi-ghost town just a few miles SW. Follow Highway 210. ~Kathryn Davidson"
