= Laurel, Oregon =

Unincorporated community in the state of Oregon, United States

- Unincorporated community
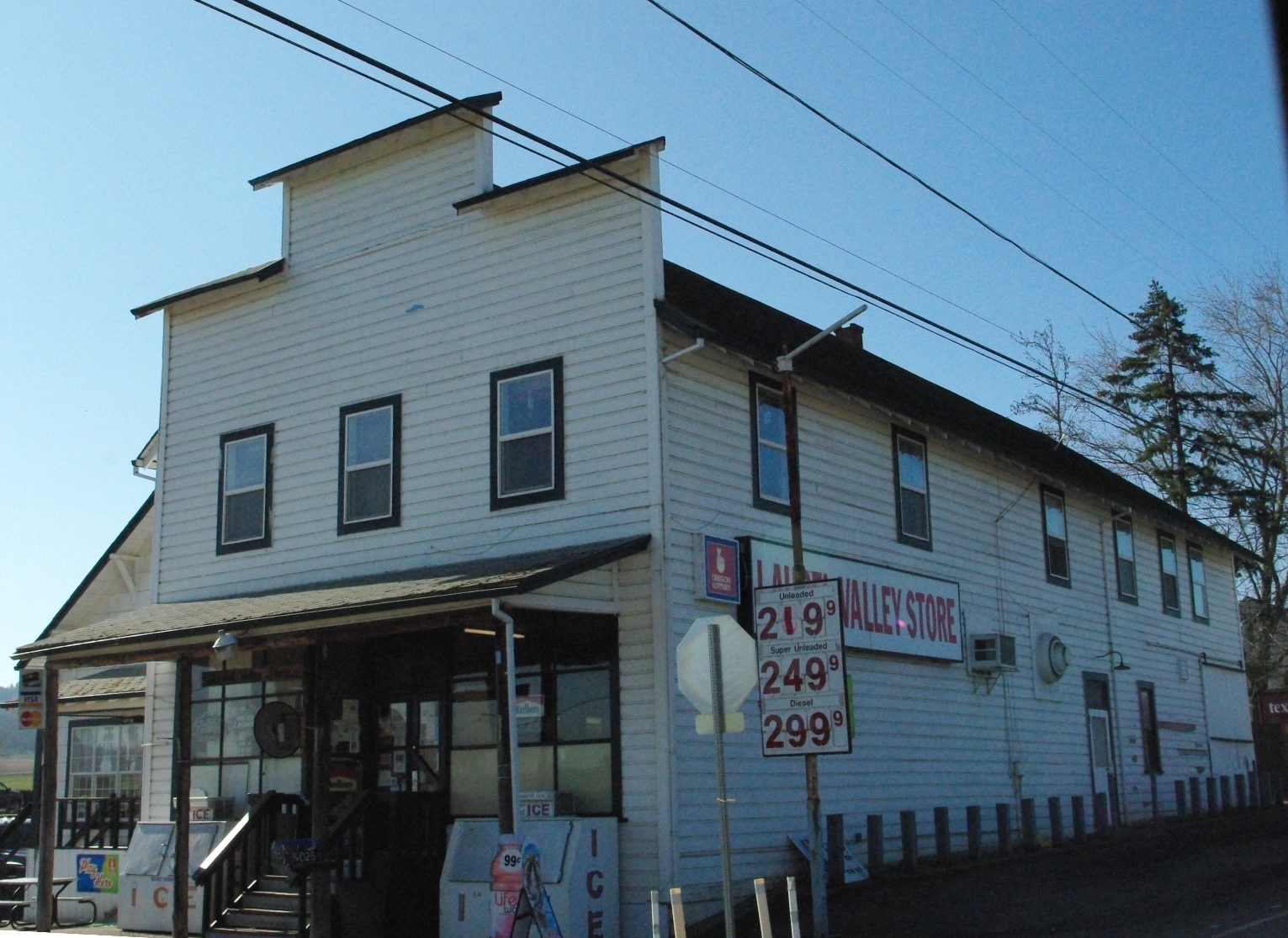
- Laurel Valley Store

- Location within the state of Oregon Laurel, Oregon (the United States)
- Coordinates: 45°25′6.42″N 122°59′30.37″W
- Country: United States
- State: Oregon
- County: Washington
- Settled: 1872
- Elevation: 197 ft (60 m)
- Time zone: UTC-8 (Pacific (PST))
  - Summer (DST): UTC-7 (PDT)
- GNIS feature ID: 1122976

Laurel is an unincorporated community in Washington County, Oregon, United States. Settled in 1872, the community is located between Hillsboro and Newberg, in the southern portion of the Tualatin Valley in the foothills of the Chehalem Mountains. The community retains its agricultural heritage. Laurel is served by the Hillsboro School District and includes the century-old Laurel Valley Store building, which is in the process of being turned into a restaurant. As an unincorporated community, Laurel has no defined boundaries or population statistics of its own.

== History ==
When Euro-American settlers came to what is now Washington County, the area was inhabited by the Atfalati Native American group. Smallpox epidemics struck the Atfalati and by the mid-1830s, only 10 percent of the tribe was left. An 1855 government treaty removed the remaining Atfalati to the Grand Ronde Indian Reservation, where there are still about 20 individuals who identify themselves as Atfalati.

In 1872, the Mulloy family settled the area that is now Laurel. Laurel received its name in the spring of 1879 when a number of citizens in the surrounding area met at the Union Schoolhouse, which was located a quarter mile east of the crossroads, to petition for a post office. C. W. Williams, who then lived on what was later the Mainland place, suggested the name of Laurel and there being many trees in the vicinity that they thought were Laurel trees, the name seemed appropriate and was accepted. (Later it was discovered that those were Madrone trees and not Laurel trees.) In May 1879, the Laurel post office was established with Alfred Mulloy, Sr. as postmaster. Mail was delivered once per week until 1881 when deliveries increased to twice per week. The population was 150 people in 1880, but dropped to 29 in the 1900 census. The post office was closed in 1935.

The Laurel Valley Store was opened in 1893 by Gus, Maud, and Jacob Messinger. In 1913 Ewell and Ella Turner purchased the store and in 1913 moved the store building and attached residence a short distance South and erected the present Laurel store building with residence attached. The last manager of the store was Hyun Chung Lee who in 2017 sold the store to Sean and Quin Denfeld. Renovation work is currently in progress.

On June 14, 1856 the Laurel School District became the third elementary district formed in Washington County. The first building, a small one-room schoolhouse was built in 1858 and was located north of the Laurel intersection. In 1881 the present location was chosen for a new building and in 1925 the current building was built with an addition made in 1952. In 1962 voters of Laurel and Farmington View voted to consolidate the districts and Laurel's students were moved to Farmington. Seventh and eighth graders went to a junior high school in Hillsboro. Laurel School was made into apartments.

A telephone line was extended to Laurel in 1904 from Hillsboro with four customers. The population grew to 50 residents in 1910.

In 1923, Laurel Community Hall was constructed for about $5,000. The purpose of the hall was "to promote sociability and friendship amongst its members and all people of the community." Finis Brown was the founder. The hall was dedicated on February 2, 1924; the mortgage was paid off in 1928. 400 people came to one of the fund raising chicken dinners and they paid $1.00 each. The hall has been used as a school gym, dance hall, Farmers Union meeting site, school Christmas programs and graduations, family gatherings, and is now the location of the Laurel Valley School of Dance.

== Churches ==
In 1876, community members started a congregation at Mountain Top with W.C. Kantner as preacher. A Baptist church was also started that year by the Brown, Steventon, Shamly, and Messinger families. The Mulloy family donated 2 acres (8,100 m^{2}) to the church in 1878 for a chapel and cemetery, and a church was built and named the Mount Olive Baptist Church during the summer. The cemetery was laid out in 1880.

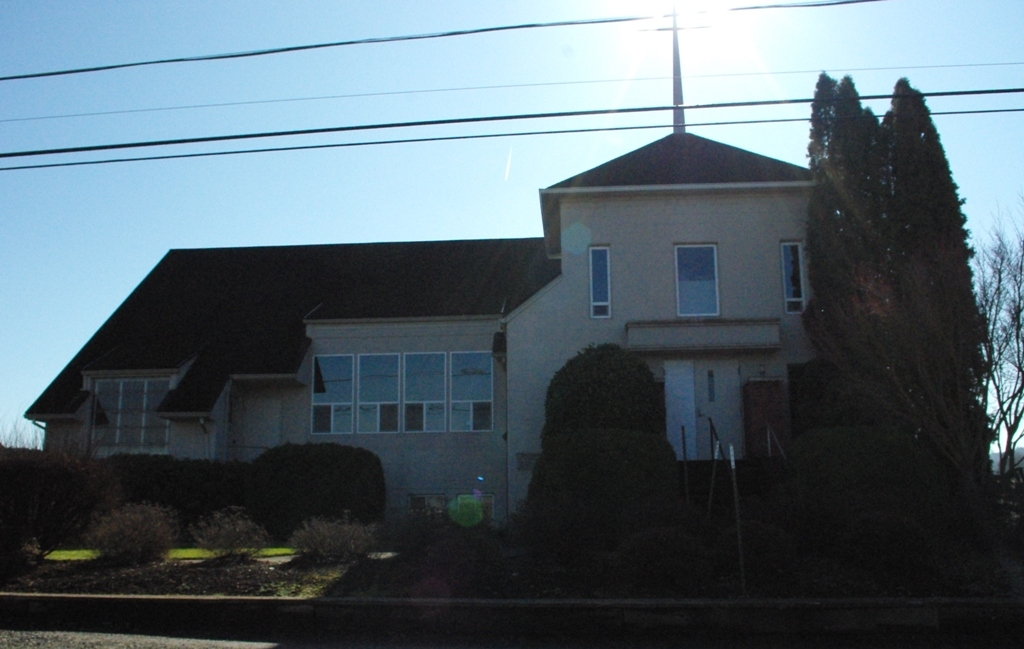
Church in the community

Laurel Church had its beginnings around 1888 when J.M. Beaumont, an Evangelical preacher, started preaching at the Baptist church. In 1892, the church was transferred to the Hillsboro mission of the church from the Newberg mission. In 1897, Rosilla and George Hathorn donated land and a new church was built, named Bethany United Evangelical Church. In 1800, the United Brethren Church was organized by Phillip Otterbein, with the churches merging in 1946.

In 1947, Lester Moore began as the church's first full-time pastor. On September 22, 1948, the original church building burned down. A new structure was erected, and a dedication ceremony was held on January 29, 1950. In 1960, a new parsonage was added, followed by an expansion started in 1974. The multi-purpose building where services are now held was dedicated in 1997.

== Present ==
The community has several agricultural farms and plant nurseries, although most of its residents commute to Portland, Hillsboro, or Beaverton for work. The Laurel Valley School of Dance has provided dance lessons in the Laurel Hall for over 30 years. The old school building has been turned into the Laurel Apartments. Children attend schools in the Hillsboro School District, with Farmington View serving as the elementary school. Fire protection services are provided by Washington County Fire District 2.

The two main cross streets in Laurel are SW Laurel Road, and SW Campbell Road. These used to be Laurel Road North, Laurel Road South, Laurel Road East, and Laurel Road West. These were changed to their present name when the county got rid of the old route/box number of addresses and implemented the present street address system, which is more common in the western United States. Laurel is located along the Washington County Scenic Loop.

At the northwest corner of the main intersection in Laurel is the largest contiguous walnut orchard in Oregon's Washington County. Laurel Valley Store is located at the same intersection and has been in operation since 1893. The current two-story building was constructed in 1913.
