= Loren LaSells Stewart =

American politician

Personal details
- Born: January 10, 1911 Cottage Grove, Oregon
- Died: January 2, 2005 (aged 93) Eugene, Oregon
- Party: Republican
- Known for: Owner, Bohemia Lumber Co. President, Oregon State Parks Advisory Committee

Loren LaSells "Stub" Stewart (January 10, 1911 – January 2, 2005) was the owner and president of the Bohemia Lumber Company and a state representative from Oregon House District 14. He is the namesake of L. L. "Stub" Stewart State Park.

== Early life ==
Stewart was born in 1911 in Cottage Grove, Oregon, to LaSells and Jessie Stewart. His father worked for the Booth-Kelly Lumber Company His maternal grandfather was Jasper Hills, namesake of Jasper, Oregon.

Stewart graduated from Cottage Grove High School in 1928 and entered Oregon Agricultural College, graduating in 1932. He was given the nickname "Stub" in school when his friends noticed that he was always the shortest person in class, and he was known for most of his life simply as Stub Stewart.

== Bohemia Lumber Company ==
In 1946, Loren Stewart and his brother Faye Stewart along with his brother-in-law Larry Chapman purchased the Bohemia Lumber Co. from LaSells Stewart for $300,000. Loren became president in 1950, and he quickly increased production from 80,000 board feet per day to 130,000. He also increased the payroll from 80 employees to 150. Stewart remained president until 1976, and on its board until 1991, when it was bought by Willamette Industries.

== Political activities and philanthropy ==
Stewart served three terms in the Oregon House of Representatives from district 14 during the 46th, 47th, and 48th legislative sessions from 1951 to 1955. He helped to plan the Oregon Centennial Celebration in 1959 and served as president of many organizations, including the Timber Operations Council, Associated Oregon Industries, National Forest Product Association, and the Oregon State Parks Advisory Committee.

In 2005, the Oregon Parks and Recreation Department renamed the planned Washington County State Park in honor of Stewart for his nearly 40 years of volunteer service to the parks department. L. L. "Stub" Stewart State Park opened in 2007.

The Stewart family became benefactors of The LaSells Stewart Center at Stewart's alma mater, Oregon State University.
