= Kimberley Strassel =

American journalist

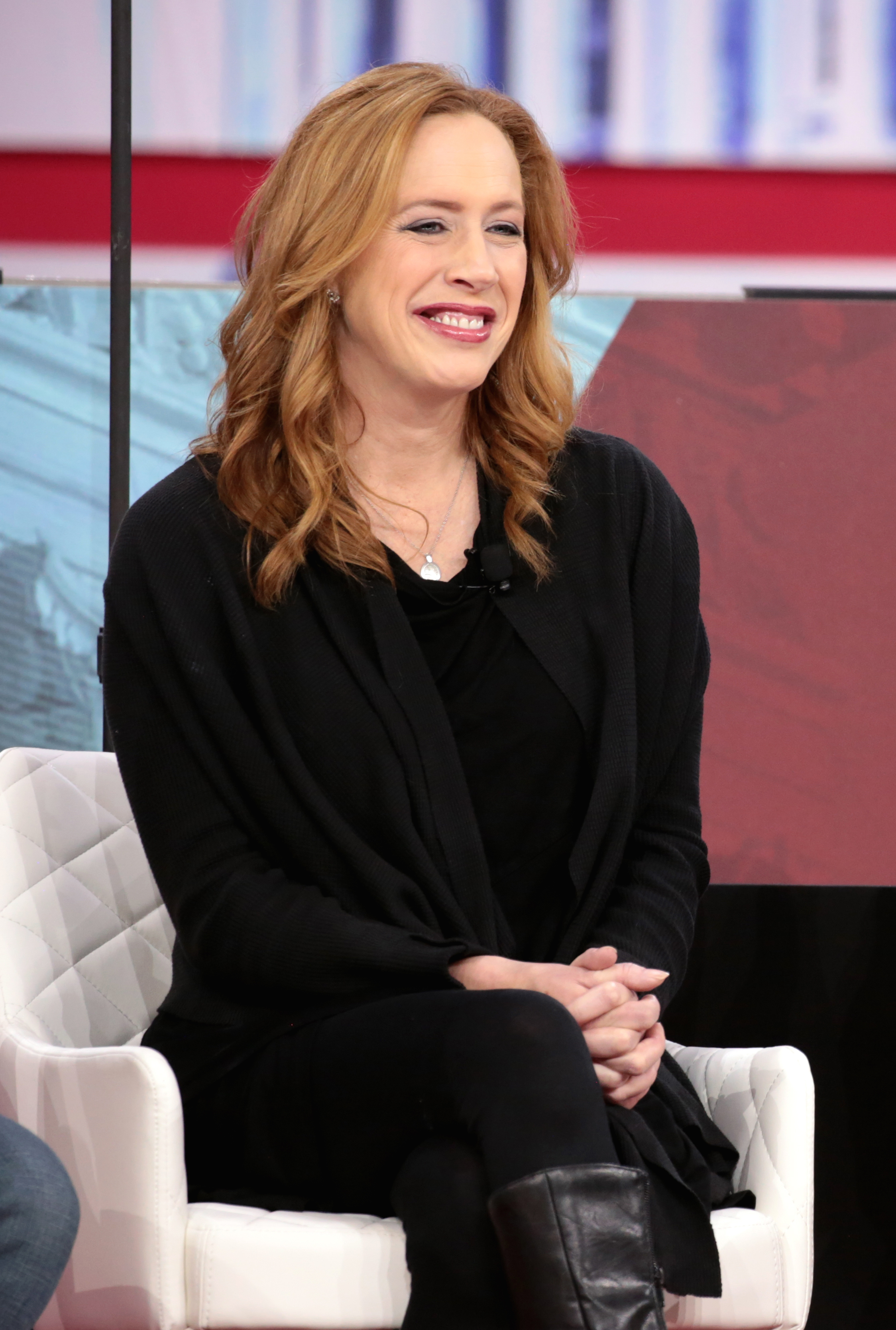
- Born: Kimberley Ann Strassel; July 24, 1972 (age 54); Buxton, Oregon, U.S.
- Education: Princeton University (BA)
- Occupations: Columnist, author
- Notable credit: Wall Street Journal
- Political party: Republican

Kimberley Ann Strassel (born July 24, 1972) is an American columnist and author who is a member of the Wall Street Journal editorial board. She writes a weekly column, "Potomac Watch", which appears on Fridays.

== Early life and education ==
Strassel grew up in Buxton, Oregon, the eldest among four girls. She graduated in 1990 from Banks High School in nearby Banks. She graduated with a B.A. from the Princeton School of Public and International Affairs in 1994, after completing a senior thesis titled "The Democratization of the Russian Secret Security and Intelligence Apparatus", under the supervision of Aaron Friedberg. Strassel immediately took a position at The Wall Street Journal upon graduation.

== Career ==
=== The Wall Street Journal ===
Strassel was a news assistant for the European edition of The Wall Street Journal in Brussels (1994–1996) and a staff writer covering technology for The Wall Street Journal Europe in London (1996–1999). She moved to New York in 1999 to cover real estate before joining the editorial page as an assistant features editor.

She became a senior editorial writer and member of the editorial board of The Wall Street Journal in 2005. In 2007, she began writing the long-running "Potomac Watch" column for The Wall Street Journal.

In an October 2017 editorial, Strassel criticized Fusion GPS, "the intelligence outfit that commissioned former British intelligence officer Christopher Steele to compile the now infamous Trump–Russia dossier."

In the wake of the Marjory Stoneman Douglas High School shooting, Strassel suggested teachers could be equipped with stun grenades to protect their students.

By October 2019, President Donald Trump had tweeted about Strassel or retweeted her commentary more than 20 times, including calling for a Pulitzer Prize for her.

Shortly before the November 2020 election, Strassel promoted claims about Joe Biden and his son Hunter Biden in an opinion column in The Wall Street Journal. Strassel's claims were contradicted by the newspaper's own news division hours later.

After Joe Biden defeated Donald Trump in the 2020 presidential election, Strassel claimed that the election contained voting irregularities. In November 2020, Strassel made claims about the election, claiming that Wisconsin's turnout percent for the election was "not feasible".

=== Books ===
Strassel has written four books:

- Leaving Women Behind: Modern Families, Outdated Laws (Rowman & Littlefield, 2005) (ISBN 0-7425-4545-8): Strassel and co-authors Celeste Colgan and John C. Goodman argue that government regulation interferes with marketplace initiatives to provide women with economic opportunity.
- The Intimidation Game: How the Left Is Silencing Free Speech (Twelve, 2016): Strassel criticizes campaign finance laws, which she contends are used by the left wing to infringe upon free speech and free association rights.
- Resistance (At All Costs): How Trump Haters are Breaking America (Twelve, 2019)
- The Biden Malaise: How America Bounces Back from Joe Biden's Dismal Repeat of the Jimmy Carter Years (Twelve, 2023): Strassel argues that Joe Biden, like Jimmy Carter before him, has mired the country in weakness, inflation and political unease.

=== Other ===
In 2014, Strassel was awarded a $250,000 Bradley Prize from the conservative Bradley Foundation.

In February 2016, Strassel was among the panelists for a Republican presidential primary debate held in South Carolina.

== Personal life ==
Strassel married journalist Matthew Rose in Buxton, Oregon, on July 15, 2000, with whom she has three children, a son followed by two daughters. As of 2014 they were still together, but subsequently divorced.

In 2017 Strassel remarried. Her current husband is from Alaska, where the couple now lives.
