= Matthew Rose =

Matthew Rose may refer to:

- Matthew K. Rose (born 1960), American business executive, former CEO of the Burlington Northern Santa Fe Corporation
- Matthew Rose (journalist) (born 1972), British-born reporter for the Wall Street Journal
- Matthew Rose (footballer) (born 1975), English football coach and former player
- Matthew Rose (bass) (born 1978), English bass singer
- Matthew Rose (swimmer) (born 1981), Canadian swimmer
- Matt Kuwata (born 1994), Japanese model and media personality releasing music under the pseudonym Matt Rose
- Matthew Rose (EastEnders), a character on the BBC television program EastEnders
