= Manning, Oregon =

Unincorporated community in the state of Oregon, United States

Manning
- Unincorporated community
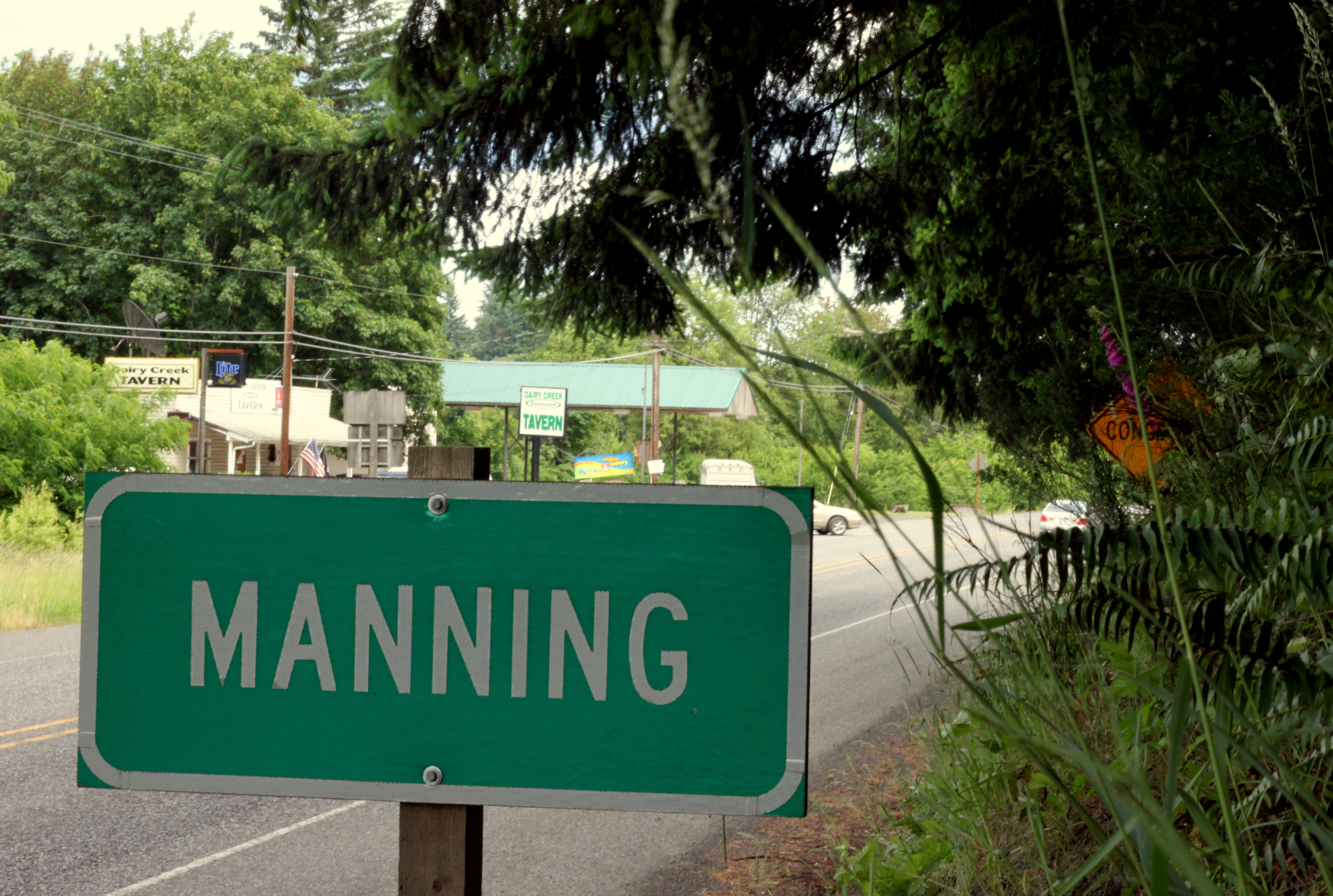
- Sign and highway in Manning

- Location within the state of Oregon Manning (the United States)
- Coordinates: 45°39′54″N 123°9′45″W
- Country: United States
- State: Oregon
- County: Washington
- Time zone: UTC-8 (Pacific (PST))
  - Summer (DST): UTC-7 (PDT)
- ZIP code: 97125
- Area codes: 503 and 971

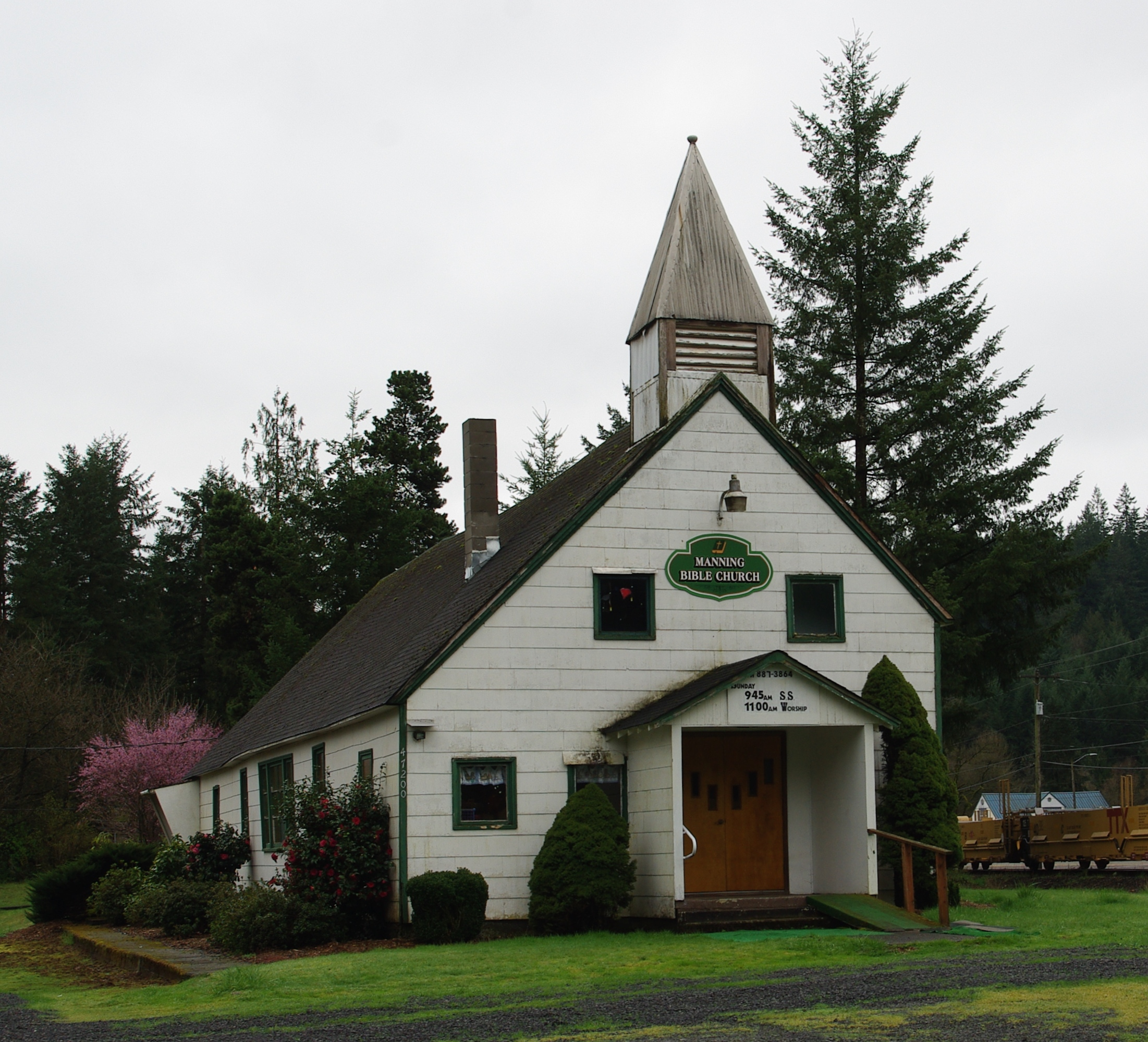
Manning Bible Church

Manning is an unincorporated community in Washington County, Oregon, United States on the Sunset Highway (U.S. Route 26/Oregon Route 47). The Banks–Vernonia State Trail, a rail trail conversion, passes through Manning. The NorthWest POINT offers twice-daily roundtrip intercity bus service between Portland and Astoria with a flag stop in Manning.

== History ==
Manning was named for Martin Manning, who took up a land claim there in 1865. Manning post office was established in 1890. In 1954, the community joined with neighboring Buxton and Banks to form the Tri-City Rural Fire Protection District (now Banks Fire District). The Manning school, part of the Banks School District, closed in 1987.

== Notable people ==
- Hollie Pihl
