= L. L. "Stub" Stewart State Park =

State park in Oregon, United States

L. L. "Stub" Stewart Memorial State Park
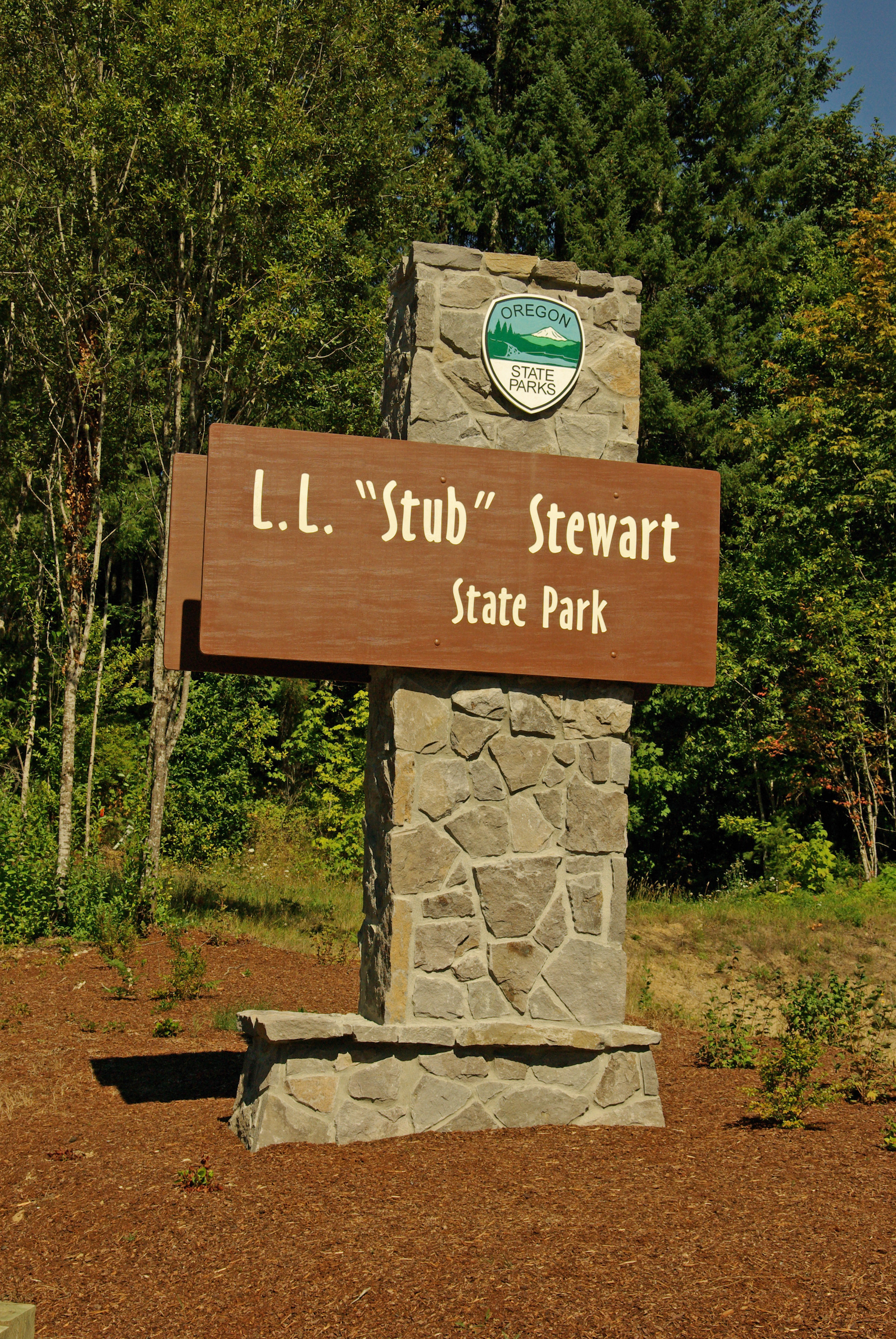
- Park entrance

- Location within Oregon Location within the United States
- Type: Public, state
- Location: Washington County, Oregon, USA
- Nearest city: Vernonia
- Coordinates: 45°44′13″N 123°11′34″W
- Area: 1,654 acres (669 ha)
- Established: 2007
- Operator: Oregon Parks and Recreation Department

L. L. "Stub" Stewart Memorial State Park is a 1,654-acre (669 ha) Oregon state park in Washington County near the community of Buxton. When the park opened in 2007 it was the first new full-service state park in Oregon since 1972. The park includes hiking trails, mountain bike trails, horseback riding, RV and tent campsites, and cabins among other amenities. Located off Oregon Route 47 in the foothills of the Northern Oregon Coast Range, the park connects to the Banks–Vernonia State Trail.

Stub Stewart Memorial State Park has been a favorite astronomy spot for amateur astronomers in the area, with organizations such as OMSI hosting multiple star parties at the venue. The site is a great spot for astronomers to set up their telescopes and view the night sky as the trees shield the hilltop from the light pollution from the cities in the area.

== History ==
Plans for a park in Washington County began in the late 1990s. By 2001 a master plan had been completed and the acquisition of land for the park began. Construction began in 2003 when roads were installed to the park area from Highway 47. By 2005 construction of the facilities and campgrounds had begun on the $18 million facility. The park was scheduled to open for the Memorial Day weekend in May 2007, but the opening was delayed until July 8, 2007.

The working name for the park was Washington County State Park, but was later changed to Hare's Canyon State Park. In 2005, it was changed to the current name which honors the memory of lumberman and state representative Loren LaSells "Stub" Stewart, who had died in January of that year. He had served an extended time on the Oregon Parks and Recreation Commission, the co-owner of lumber company and a noted philanthropist. The park opened mountain bike-only trails in June 2012, the first in the state.

Washington County Circuit Court Judge Hollie Pihl pushed for the State of Oregon to build the new state park on the plot of land it is currently on to connect it with the Banks-Vernonia State Trail he and his wife helped build. Because of his contributions, Pihl had a scenic viewpoint named in his honor called "Hollie's Point of View", a double entendre for those who knew him, as he was a very opinionated man.

== Features ==
Located four miles (6 km) north of U.S. Route 26 and 11 miles (18 km) south of Vernonia on the east side of Oregon Route 47, Stub Stewart sits primarily on former timber land along the Banks–Vernonia State Trail. Natural features include a hill that rises from an elevation of 730 feet (220 m) to the 1,250-foot (380 m) level. Other natural features of Stub Stewart Park are canyons and forests. The built environment includes several vehicular bridges, a visitor center, cabins, day use areas, and horse camp. Other items include 78 camping sites that include 43 full utility hook-up sites, 23 hike in primitive campsites, 12 walk in tent sites, and 15 cabins. These cabins share a central shower and restroom building.

There are two disc golf courses onsite: "Li'l Stub," a beginner-friendly 9-hole pitch-'n'-putt course, and "Hares Canyon," a professional-level 18-hole course that has multiple pin positions.

The horse camp contains 16 campsites. Fourteen horse campsites have single-RV parking and a four-stall corral. Two horse campsites have a six-stall corral and double-RV parking. There are roughly 15 miles (24 km) of trails at the park, many of which are for mountain bikes only. It is a prime choice for mountain bikers in the Portland metro area. It is the only full-service state park in the state's second most populous county.

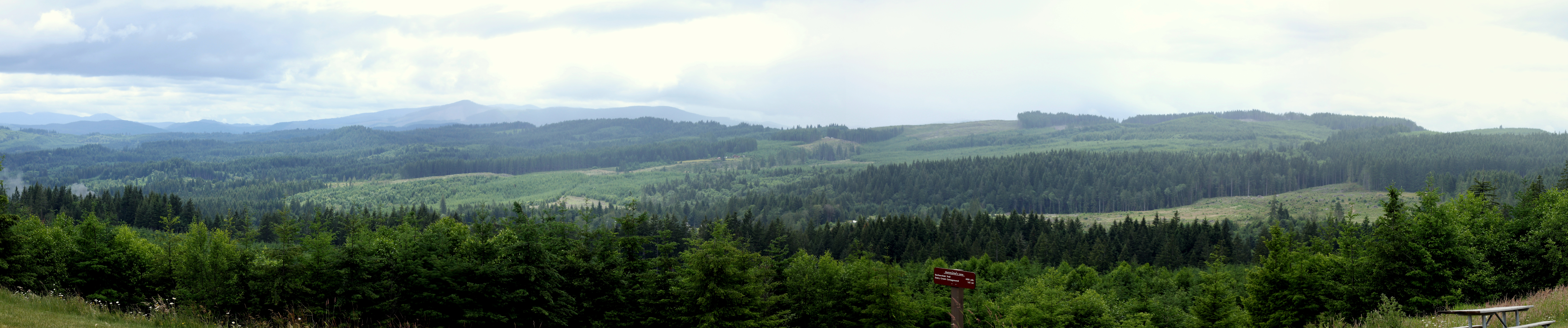
View west from Hilltop Day Use Area

== See also ==
- List of Oregon state parks
