= M. E. Blanton House =

Historic house in Oregon, United States

- U.S. National Register of Historic Places
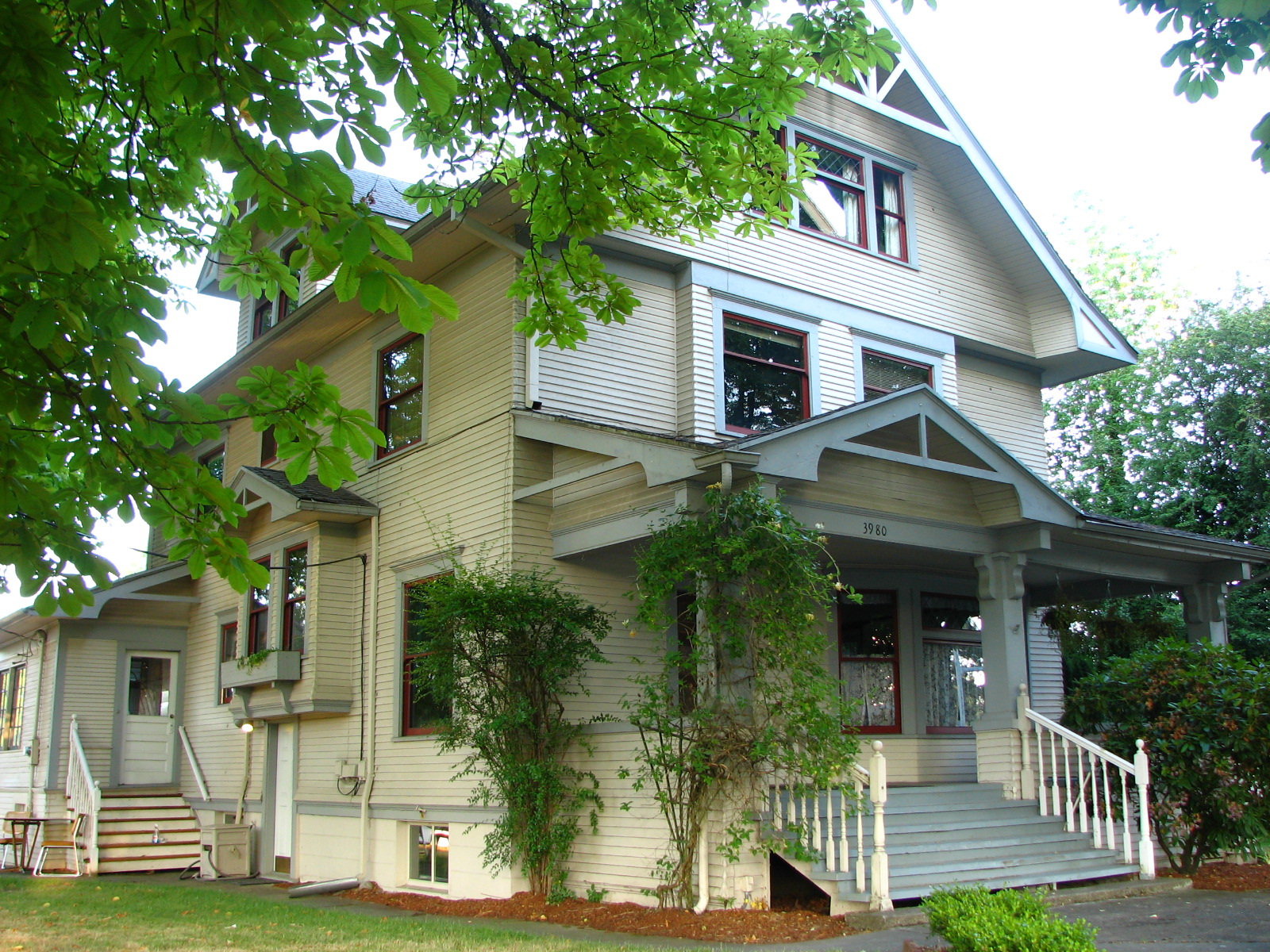
- Front of the house in 2008

- Location within Oregon Location within the United States
- Location: 3980 SW 170th Avenue; Aloha, Oregon
- Nearest city: Beaverton
- Coordinates: 45°29′28″N 122°51′05″W
- Built: 1912; 114 years ago
- Architectural style: Craftsman
- NRHP reference No.: 89000123
- Added to NRHP: March 2, 1989

The M. E. Blanton House is a two-and-a-half-story Craftsman style historic building in the community of Aloha in the U.S. state of Oregon. Built in 1912, it is situated along Southwest 170th Avenue less than a block south of Tualatin Valley Highway. The interior of the 3,000-square-foot (280 m^{2}) house is of the Arts and Crafts style. It was added to the National Register of Historic Places in 1989 and is used as a law office since 1999.

== History ==
The land where Blanton House sits was first owned by Portland butcher Arthur Johnson. Starting in 1857 he began buying land west of Portland and eventually ended up with over 1,400 acres (570 ha) that his estate sold in 1909 to the Merchants Savings and Trust. In 1907, the Southern Pacific Railroad started service in the area, which was converted to an electric interurban line in 1914, and had a station at Huber.

The bank sold the land it had acquired from the estate to William A. Shaw, a partner in the Shaw-Fear Company. Shaw-Fear was a local real estate development firm, and Mr. M. E. Blanton was a road grader for Shaw-Fear. Blanton purchased the lot where the house stands in 1911, and the next year a 2 1/2-story home was built on the property along what was Huber Road, today's 170th Avenue, and what became Blanton Street.

Blanton's employer developed the area and donated five lots to build a school, with Blanton grading the road through what was then the community of Huber. Tualatin Valley Highway was built in 1918 adjacent to the railroad. In 1922, Blanton sold his house to the Avondale Farm Company, with the property going through several ownership changes during the next thirteen years before Leonard H. and Alice M. Place bought it in 1935. The Places owned the home until 1949, and it was later used as a group home for drug and alcohol dependency. In 1929, the interurban railroad ceased service. Blanton house was turned into a commercial office in 1987. On March 2, 1989, the house was added to the National Register of Historic Places.

In 1989, attorney Lauren J. Paulson purchased the property and restored it. Washington County decided in 1999 to widen 170th Avenue, which would eliminate much of the yard and cause the removal of two arched entrance ways along with several trees. After a year of proposals, the project was approved in April 2001 despite neighbors objecting to the project, including Paulson. Paulson even filed an appeal with the Oregon Land Use Board of Appeals, but it was rejected in September 2001. As of 2013, the building was used as the law office for Paulson.

== Architecture ==
Blanton House has 3,000 square feet (280 m^{2}) with seven bedrooms over 2 1/2 storeys, plus a full basement. There is also a matching pump house and small pool on the grounds. The pool was the only pool in Aloha. When the property was listed on the NRHP it also had decorative entrances to the property consisting of two archways, but those were removed due to a road widening project.

The exterior is of the Craftsman style with horizontal lap siding and a hip roof. There are gables with truss ornaments and dormers in several places, plus a brick endwall on the south side. The building has two porches, and at the time of listing on the NRHP it had leaded, double-hung sash windows. Inside, the style is Arts and Crafts, which includes dark woodwork throughout. The first floor includes a living room, dining room, den, kitchen, foyer, and a small bathroom. The second and third floors consist of seven bedrooms and one bathroom, while the basement is unfinished. There are also a variety of pieces of built-in wood-furniture, such as a bench.

== See also ==
- National Register of Historic Places listings in Washington County, Oregon
