= Buxton, Oregon =

Unincorporated community in the state of Oregon, United States

Buxton
- Unincorporated community
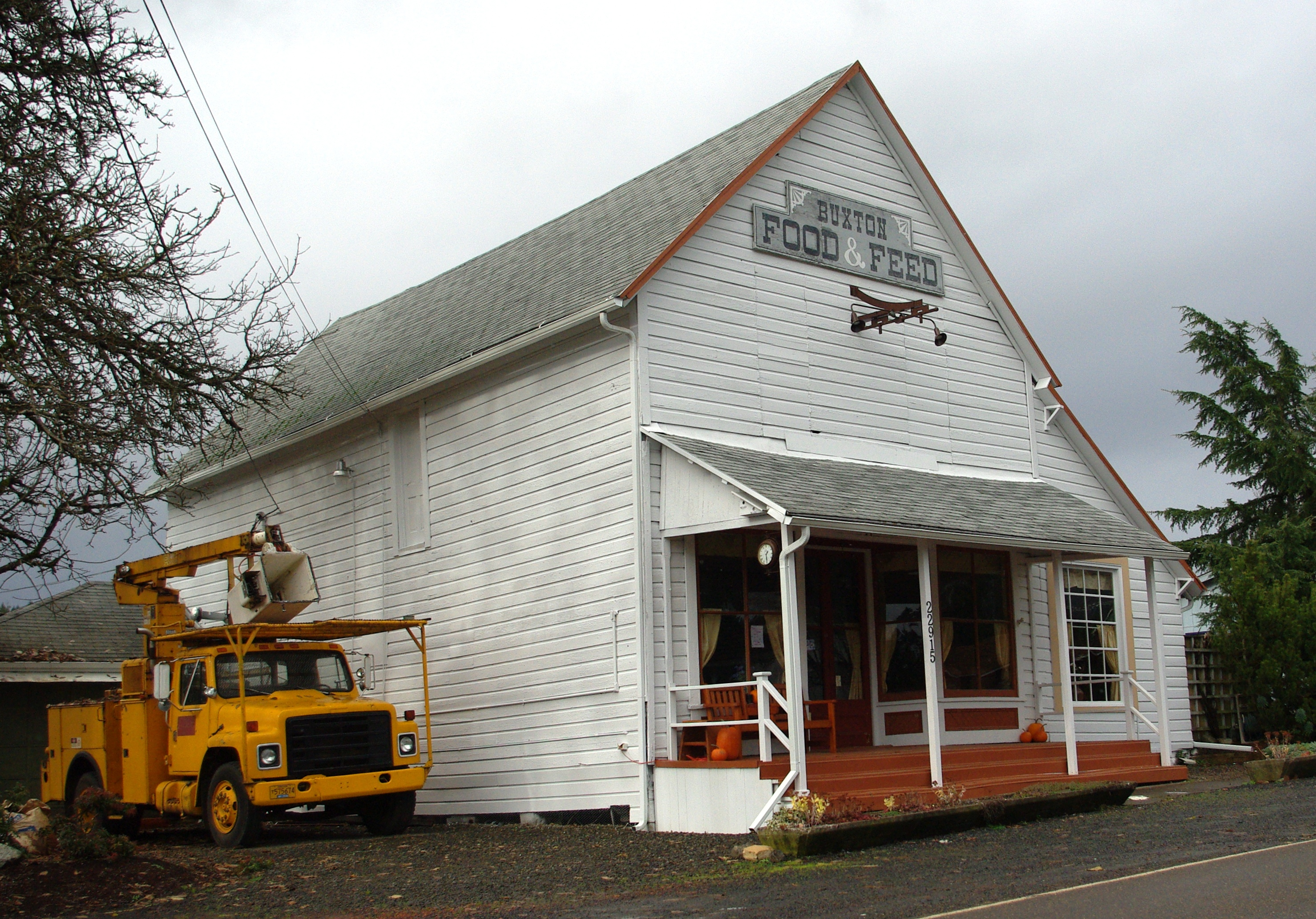
- Buxton Food & Feed Store

- Location within the state of Oregon Buxton (the United States)
- Coordinates: 45°41′20″N 123°11′23″W
- Country: United States
- State: Oregon
- County: Washington
- Elevation: 328 ft (100 m)
- Time zone: UTC-8 (Pacific (PST))
  - Summer (DST): UTC-7 (PDT)
- ZIP codes: 97109

Buxton is an unincorporated community in Washington County, Oregon, United States, near Oregon Route 47.

== History ==
The Buxton area was settled by Henry Buxton Jr. in 1884, and the town was named for his family, including his father, also named Henry Buxton, a pioneer of 1841. A post office was established on December 27, 1886, with Henry T. Buxton as the first postmaster. Buxton was also the name of a station on the Portland, Astoria & Pacific Railroad above Mendenhall Creek east of the community.

By the early 1900’s Buxton had a population of 2000-plus. The logging industry and building the railroad made this community grow. A new school building was completed about 1938. In 1954, the community joined with neighboring Manning and Banks to form the Tri-City Rural Fire Protection District (now Banks Fire District). The post office continued until at least 1976 and had a zip code of 97109. The Buxton School, part of the Banks School District, closed in 1998 with the building sold in 2000 to the Banks Christian Academy. Banks Christian Academy closed the Buxton school in June 2015, with the school then being taken over by Faith Bible Christian School.

== Current Community ==
Crafted with locally-milled logs on the exterior, a new fire station in Buxton, along Highway 26 across from Hornshuh Creek Road, opened in October 2020.

The scenic Buxton Trestle is a high railroad trestle bridge that crosses the valley of Mendenhall Creek. The trestle was built in 1920 and is 700 feet long. The trestle has been converted for hiker/biker use as part of the Banks–Vernonia State Trail and can also be viewed from the horse bypass, which loop below it to cross the creek.

The Salmonberry Trail, a planned 84-mile hiking and biking trail through the Oregon Coast Range along the Salmonberry River, will go through Buxton.

== Climate ==
This region experiences warm, dry summers, with the average monthly temperature being 71.6 °F (22.0 °C). According to the Köppen Climate Classification system, Buxton has a warm-summer Mediterranean climate, abbreviated "Csb" on climate maps.

== Transportation ==
- The nearest public transit is the Intercity Bus Service, operated by NW Connector, which stops in Highway 47 and Sunset Avenue in Banks, and provides daily trips between Tillamook and Portland, connecting directly with Amtrak services in Portland.
- Buxton Trailhead of the Banks–Vernonia State Trail

== Points of interest ==
- L. L. "Stub" Stewart Memorial State Park
