= Huber, Oregon =

Unincorporated community in the state of Oregon, United States

Huber
- Unincorporated community
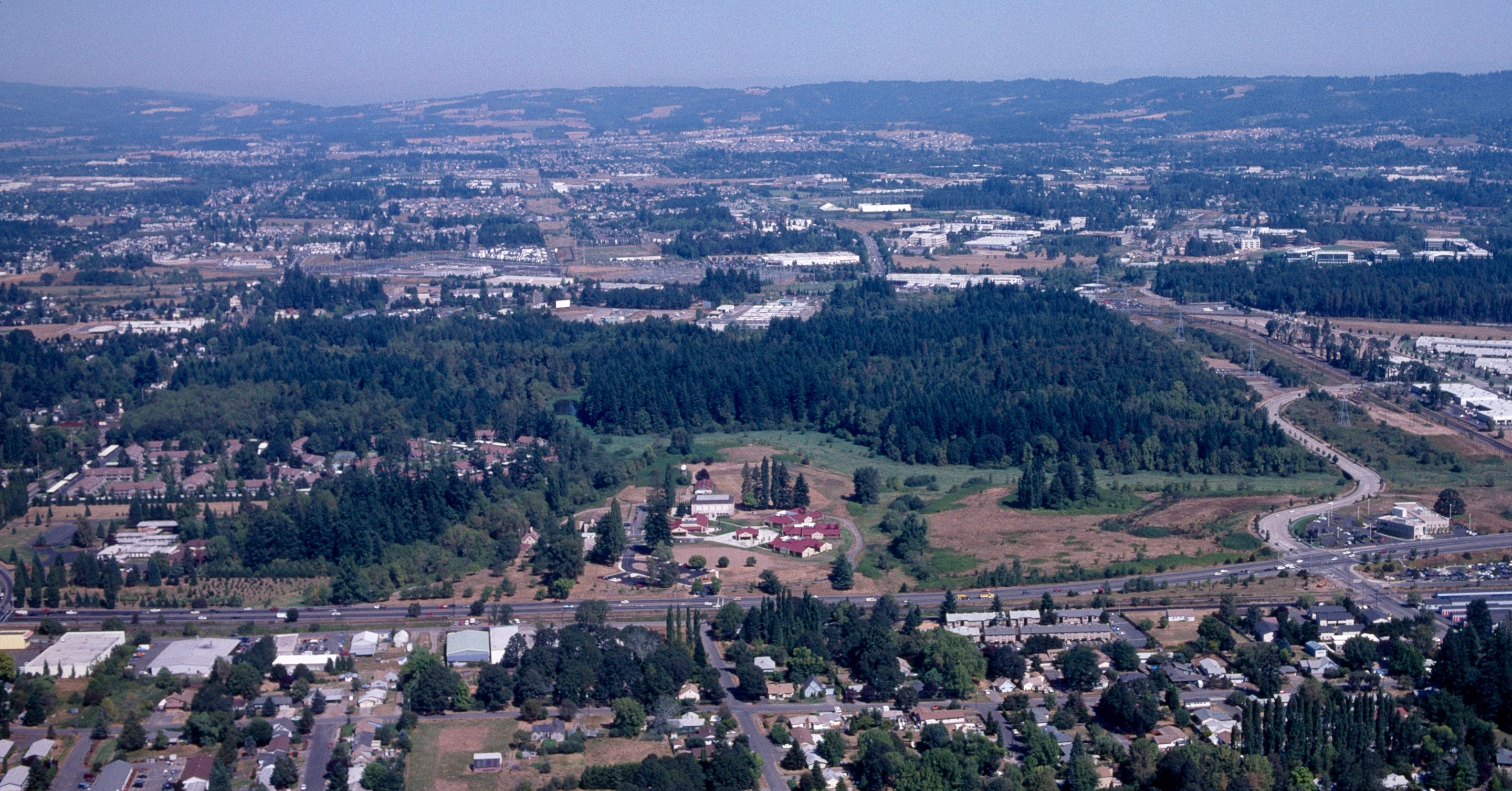
- Aerial photograph of the Tualatin Hills Nature Park in 1998, Huber is in the foreground.

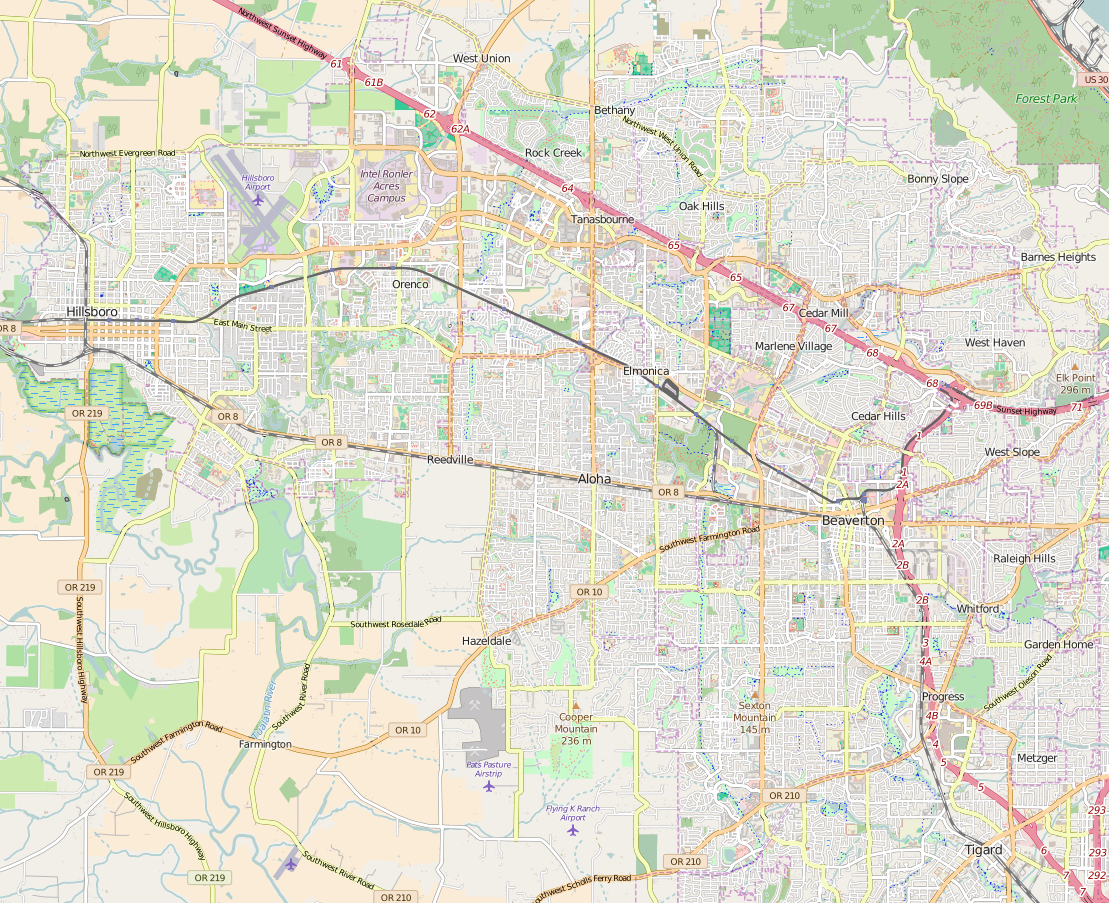
- Location within Washington County, OR
- Coordinates: 45°29′31″N 122°51′4″W
- Country: United States
- State: Oregon
- County: Washington
- Elevation: 197 ft (60 m)
- Time zone: UTC-8 (Pacific (PST))
  - Summer (DST): UTC-7 (PDT)
- ZIP codes: 97007
- GNIS feature ID: 1166664

Huber is an unincorporated community in Washington County, Oregon, United States, now mostly located within Aloha near the Tualatin Hills Nature Park.

== History ==
Huber was established in 1910. It is named for Jacob Huber, an early resident of the area. The Huber post office opened in 1916 and was closed on December 31, 1953.

Up until about 1953, the road now known as 170th Avenue was known as Huber Avenue.
