= Matthew Rose (journalist) =

British journalist

- Born: Matthew Justin Rose; 30 September 1972 (age 53)
- Education: Oxford University; M.A. Johns Hopkins University
- Occupation: Journalist

Matthew Rose (born 30 September 1972) is a British-born journalist for the New York Times in New York, where he is an editorial director for the Opinion section, overseeing guest essays and video. He was previously enterprise editor for the Wall Street Journal, a position he held until September 2023.

== Biography ==
Rose is the son of Susan and Philip Rose of London, England. He graduated with first class honors from Oxford University and has an MA in international affairs from the Johns Hopkins University School of Advanced International Studies (SAIS). Rose was previously deputy bureau chief in Washington D.C., and a page-one editor for the Wall Street Journal. He has covered the media industry for the Wall Street Journal and the technology industry for the Wall Street Journal Europe.

In 2000, Rose married Kimberley Ann Strassel in Buxton, Oregon. The couple have three children. They have since divorced.

== Career ==
In 2016 Rose moved from being deputy Washington, D.C. bureau chief for the Wall Street Journal to become enterprise editor of the Journal.

In that position, he helped oversee some of the newsroom’s most ambitious coverage, from daily news features to projects that won Pulitzer Prizes and Polk and Loeb awards. Notable examples include coverage of Donald Trump’s payoffs to Stormy Daniels and the Facebook Files series, which revealed how much the platform knows about the harm it causes.

=== Notable articles ===
Rose's 2004 essay on poet Felix Dennis, Felix Dennis, No Pro, Has Spotted His Foe: Poetry's Status Quo; He Likes Meter and Rhyme, Calls Free Verse a Crime And Dog Poems Sublime, was "much discussed.".

In 2007 tensions between Rose and Jonathan Franzen drew attention.
