= Forest Grove School District (Oregon) =

School district in Oregon, United States

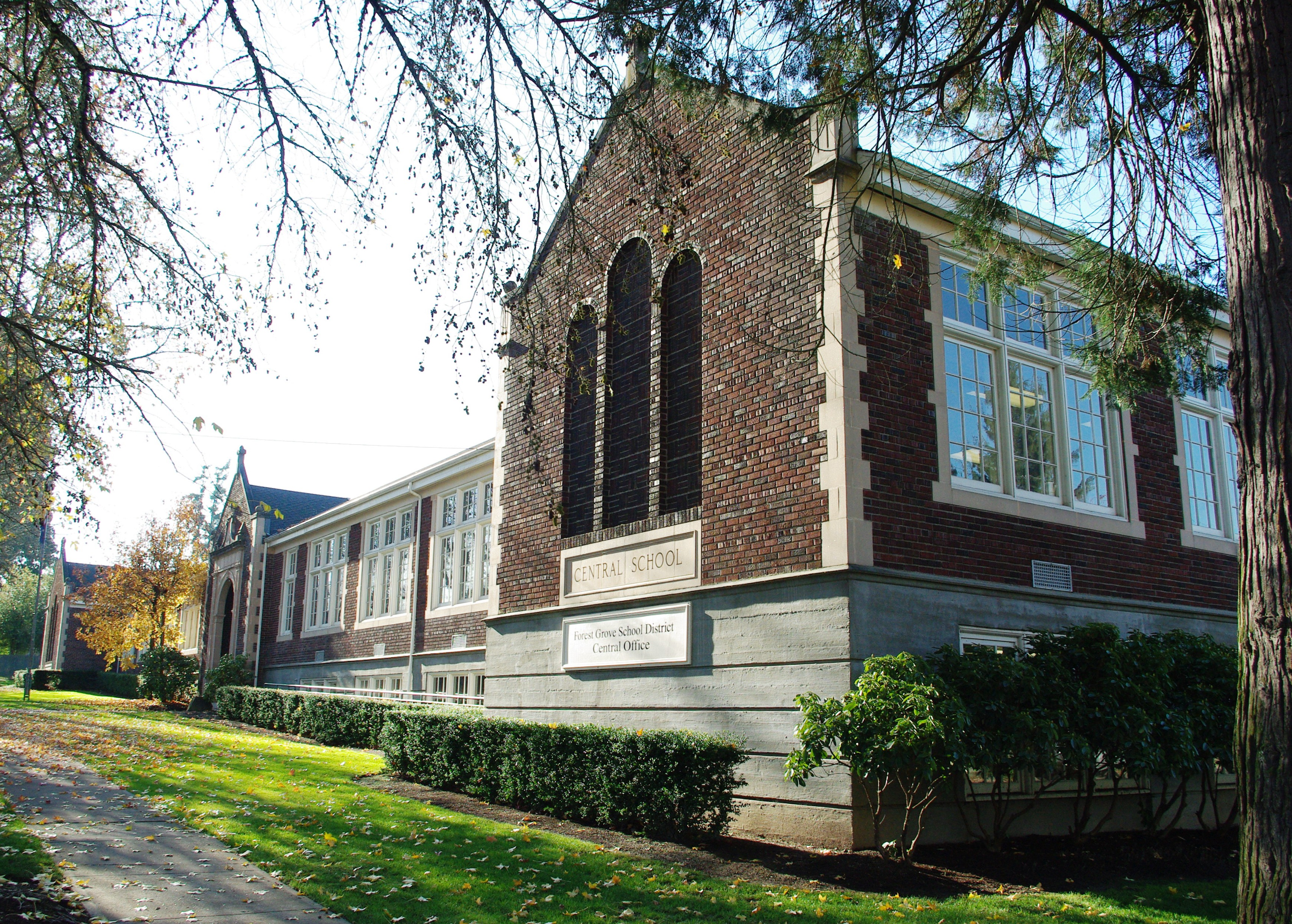
Forest Grove District Office

Forest Grove School District is a public school district in Washington County, Oregon, United States. It serves the communities of Cornelius, Dilley, Forest Grove and Gales Creek. David Parker is the superintendent of the district. The Forest Grove Elementary college District 15 was created in 1855 and later merged with several other districts including the Cornelius Elementary School District 2, with the larger district then later merged with the Forest Grove high school district (5). The Cornelius district was dissolved in 1960, with the western parts of the enrollment area going to the Forest Grove district and the eastern part going to the Hillsboro districts.

== Demographics ==
In the 2009 school year, the district had 104 students classified as homeless by the Department of Education, or 1.7% of students in the district.

== Schools ==
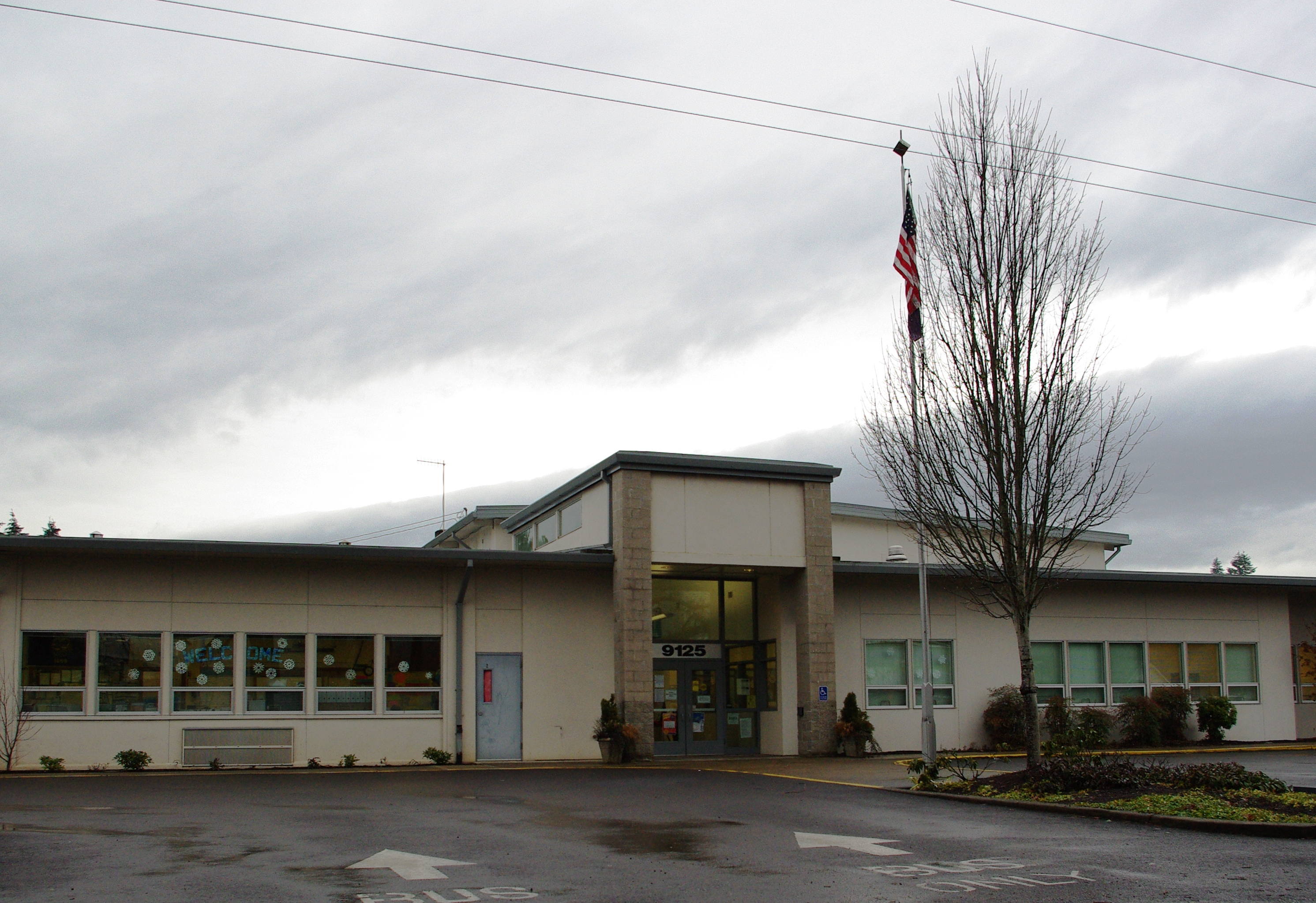
Gales Creek Elementary School

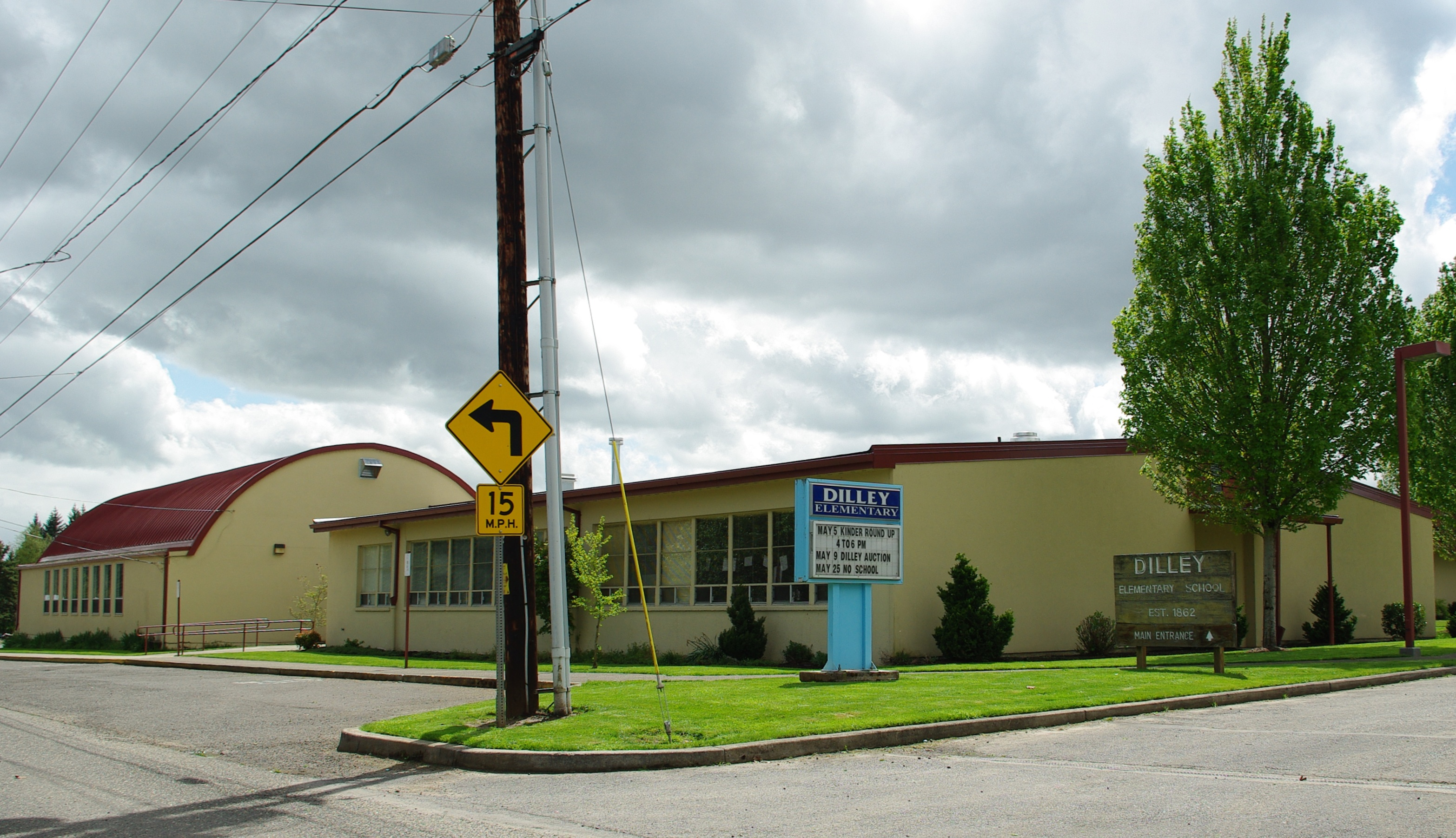
Dilley Elementary

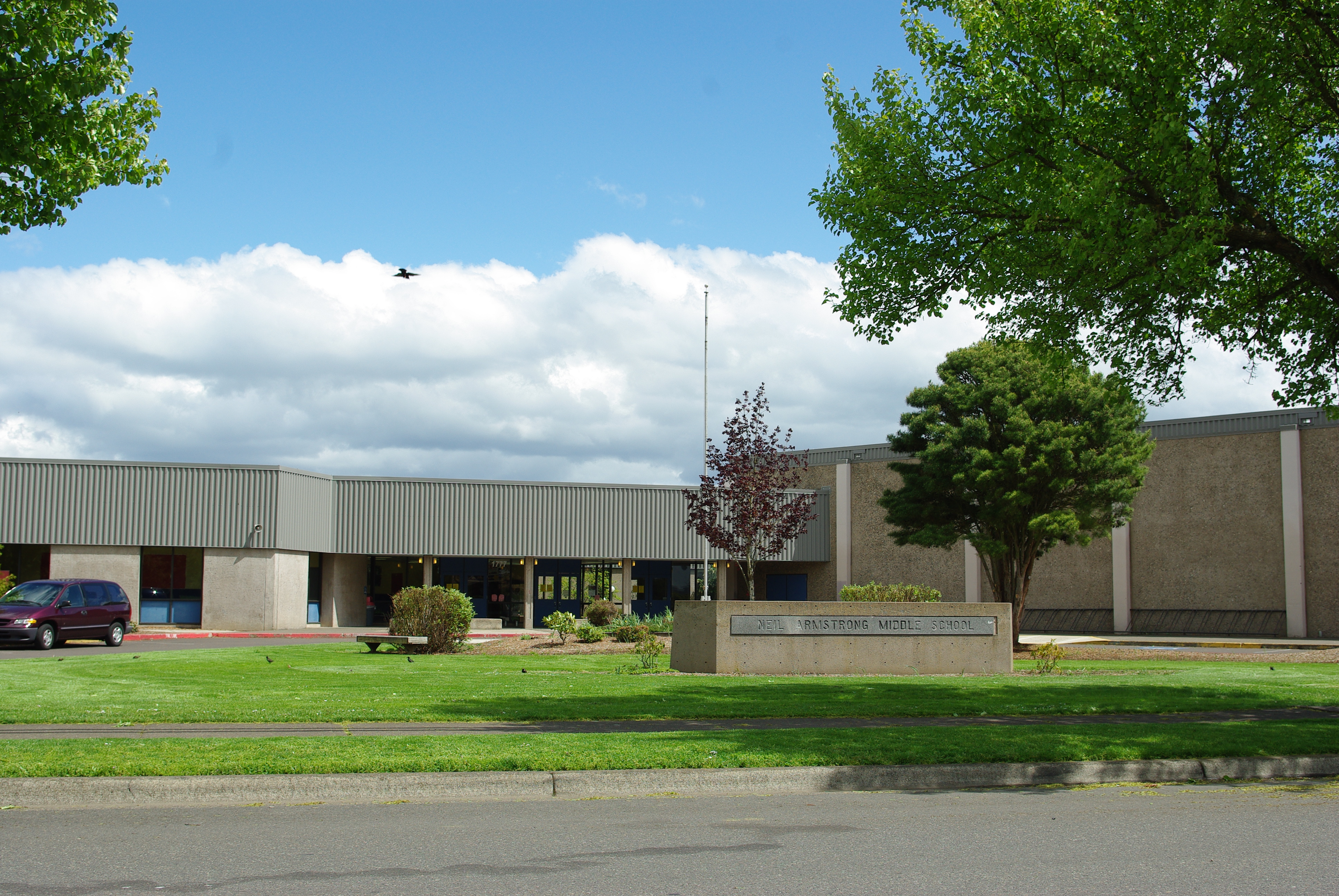
Neil Armstrong Middle School

=== Elementary schools ===
- Cornelius (K-4)
- Dilley (K-4)
- Echo Shaw (K-6)
- Fern Hill (K-4)
- Harvey Clarke (K-4) - named after pioneer Harvey L. Clark
- Joseph Gale (K-4) - named after pioneer Joseph Gale
- Gales Creek (K-4) - closed Fall 2011
- Forest Grove Community School (Ages 6–15)

=== Upper elementary schools ===
- Tom McCall East & West (two buildings) (grades five and six)

=== Middle schools ===
- Neil Armstrong (grades seven and eight)
- Forest Grove Community School (Ages 6–15)

=== High schools ===
- Forest Grove High School (9-12)

=== Other schools ===
- Oak Grove Academy (previously Gales Creek School)

== Court case ==
Forest Grove School District was the plaintiff in Forest Grove School Dist. v. T. A., a United States Supreme Court case decided in 2009. The lawsuit involved whether the parents of a student who had never received special education services from a public school district was potentially eligible for reimbursement of tuition paid to a private school under the Individuals with Disabilities Education Act. The parents in the case sent their son to Mount Bachelor Academy due to behavioral problems and the use of drugs. In the decision, the court determined that families in this type of situation can be entitled to reimbursement, but remanded the case back to the trial court to determine if this particular family should be entitled to reimbursement. The district court then determined the family was not entitled to reimbursement, and the family appealed again.
