= Banks–Vernonia State Trail =

State park and trail in Oregon, US

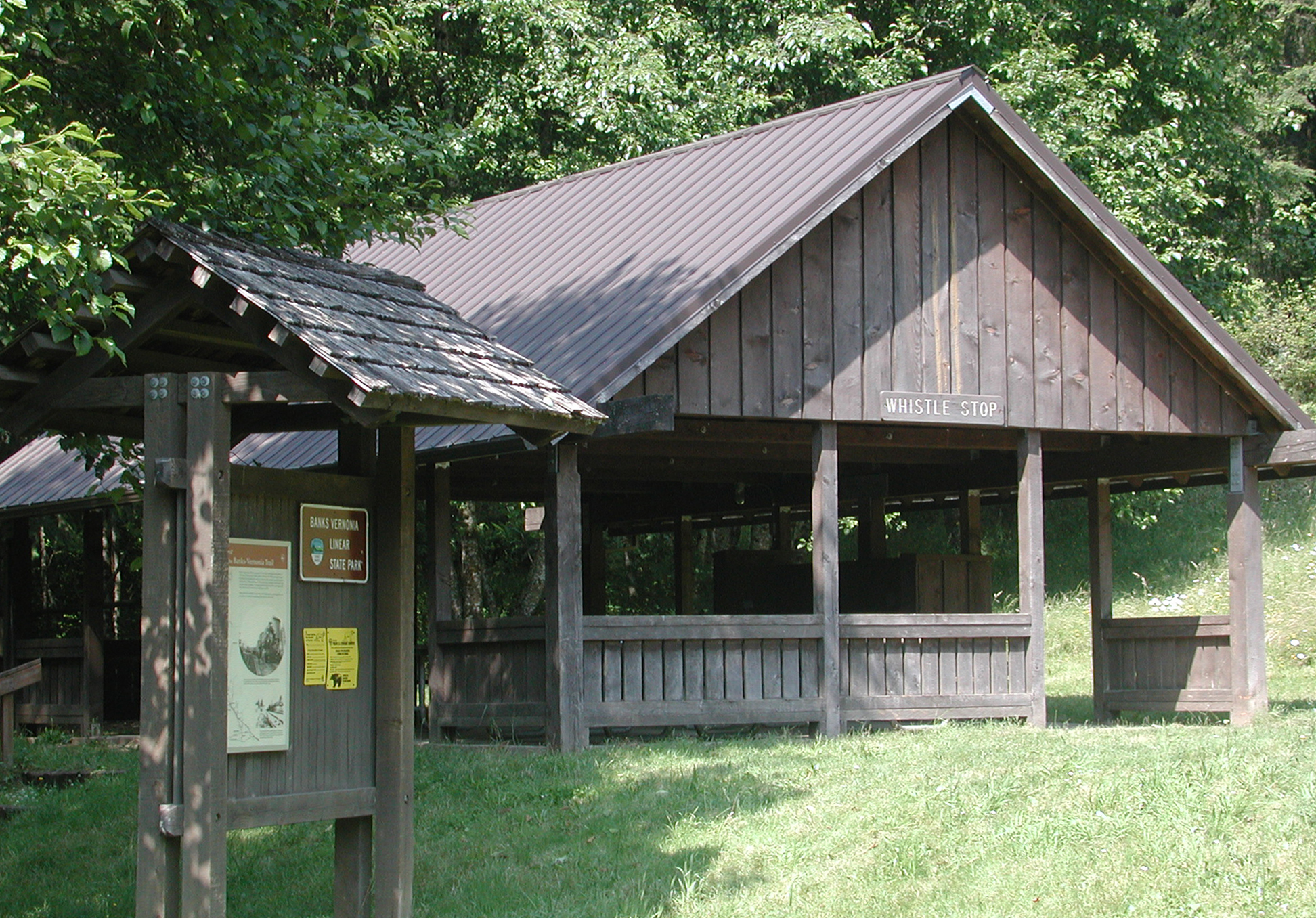
- Whistle-stop shelter at the Buxton trailhead

- Location within Oregon
- Type: Public, state
- Location: Columbia and Washington counties, Oregon
- Nearest city: Between Banks and Vernonia
- Coordinates: 45.6651126°N 123.1634443°W
- Operator: Oregon Parks and Recreation Department
- Open: Year round
- Status: Day use, fee-free

The Banks–Vernonia State Trail is a paved rail trail and state park in northwest Oregon in the United States. It runs for 21 miles (34 km), primarily north–south, between the towns of Vernonia in Columbia County and Banks in Washington County on an abandoned railroad bed. Banks is about 25 miles (40 km) west of Portland.

The 8-foot-wide (2.4 m) trail is open to non-motorized uses such as hiking and biking. A 4-foot-wide (1.2 m) horse trail parallels the hiking and biking trail. The rail trail crosses 12 bridges and the Buxton Trestle, a former railroad trestle bridge that is 600 feet (180 m) long and 80 feet (24 m) high. A second railroad trestle, the Tophill (or Horseshoe) Trestle, was damaged by fire in 1986 and is bypassed with a series of switchbacks at the Tophill trailhead.

Amenities available at some locations in the park include picnicking, fishing, wildlife watching, forests, bird-watching, historic sites, public restrooms, parking, horse hitching posts, a loading platform, and a whistle stop shelter. The rail trail connects to a network of about 20 miles (32 km) of unpaved mountain-biking trails in L. L. "Stub" Stewart State Park. About 14,000 people used the rail trail in 2004.

== History ==
The Banks–Vernonia State Trail was the first linear rail trail state park in Oregon. The Portland, Astoria & Pacific Railroad built the original rail line in 1913 to transport timber, freight, and passengers. In the 1920s, trains on the line hauled logs and lumber from Keasey and the Oregon-American mill in Vernonia to Portland. The railroad stopped using the line in 1957 after the mills closed, and from 1965 through 1969 the Vernonia South Park and Sunset Railroad leased the line for a steam excursion train.

The line was abandoned in 1973. The Oregon Department of Transportation bought the right-of-way in 1974, and transferred it to the Oregon Parks and Recreation Department in 1990. In 2007, L. L. "Stub" Stewart State Park opened adjacent to the trail. Trail improvements, which continued for two decades, were completed in 2010 with the opening of the Banks trailhead and its kiosk, which resembles a railroad depot.

The beginning of the trail runs through Pihl Road, in Manning, Oregon, named after Holger Mathew Pihl Sr. Hollie Pihl, a Circuit Court Judge, and his wife Alice spent countless hours clearing brush from the abandoned rail lines and donated money to help complete the project when project funds ran out. The two also funded the Buxton Trailhead picnic pavilion and owned naming rights, choosing to call it the "Whistle Stop".

In June 2024, the trail was designated a National Recreation Trail, along with four other new trails that year.

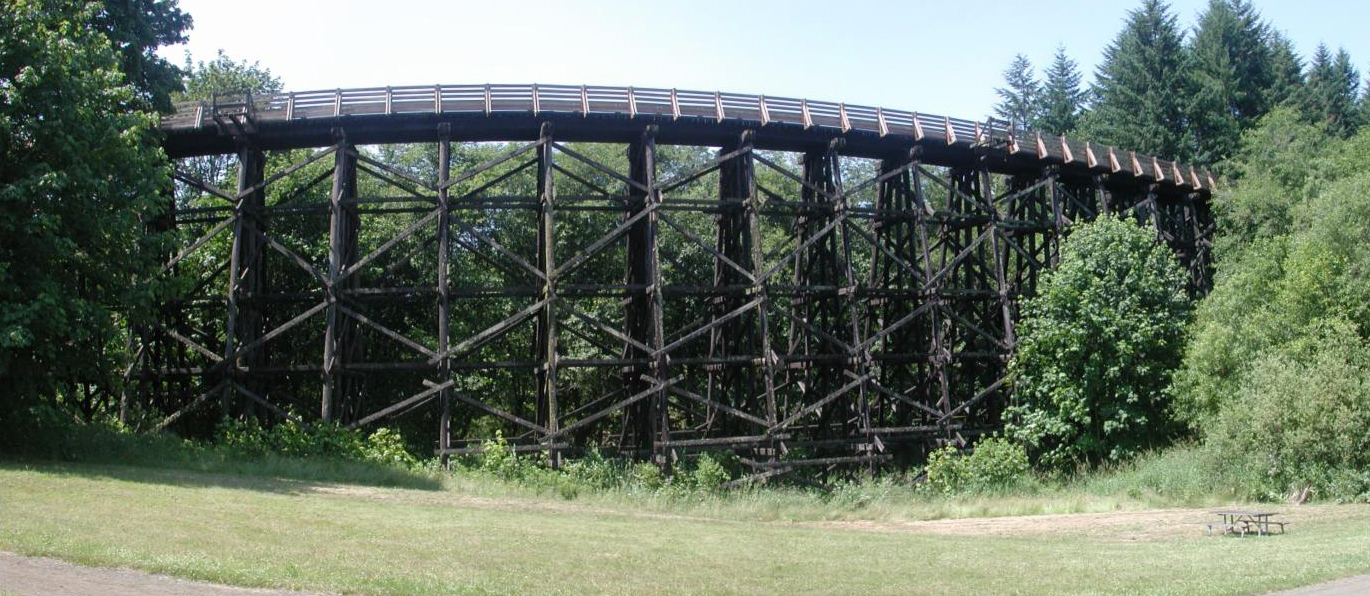
Panorama of Buxton Trestle, which carries the trail over a ravine

== Locations ==
Location	Coordinates	Trail location		Elevation	
Location	Coordinates	mi	km	ft	m
Banks trailhead	45.6218556°N 123.1138306°W	0.0	0	208	63
Manning trailhead	45.6652417°N 123.1634694°W	3.85	6.20	239	73
Buxton trailhead	45.6979000°N 123.1854139°W	6.7	10.8	459	140
Tophill trailhead	45.7585917°N 123.2016306°W	12.05	19.39	807	246
Beaver Creek trailhead	45.8107750°N 123.2305278°W	16.4	26.4	684	208
Anderson Park (Vernonia)	45.8558139°N 123.1919722°W	20.65	33.23	605	184
