= Aloha, Oregon =

Unincorporated community in the state of Oregon, United States

- Census-designated place (CDP)
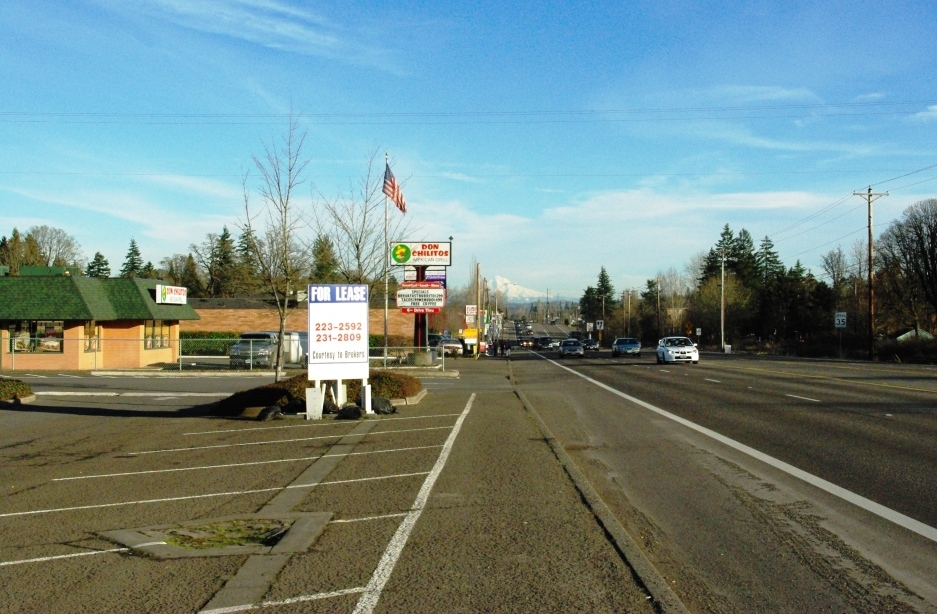
- Aloha along TV Highway looking east

- Location of Aloha, Oregon
- Coordinates: 45°29′30″N 122°52′19″W
- Country: United States
- State: Oregon
- County: Washington

Area
  - Total: 7.36 sq mi (19.05 km^{2})
  - Land: 7.36 sq mi (19.05 km^{2})
  - Water: 0 sq mi (0.00 km^{2})
- Elevation: 200 ft (61 m)

Population (2020)
  - Total: 53,828
  - Density: 7,317.4/sq mi (2,825.25/km^{2})
- Time zone: UTC-8 (Pacific (PST))
  - Summer (DST): UTC-7 (PDT)
- ZIP codes: 97003, 97006-97007, 97078
- Area codes: 503 and 971
- FIPS code: 41-01650
- GNIS feature ID: 2407723

Aloha (/əˈloʊ.ə/, not /əˈloʊhɑː/) is a census-designated place and unincorporated community in Washington County, Oregon, United States. By road it is 10.9 miles (17.5 km) west of downtown Portland. As of the 2020 Census, the population was 53,828. Fire protection and EMS services are provided through Tualatin Valley Fire and Rescue and American Medical Response.

== History ==
Wheeler was named for Ira Wheeler, an early inhabitant of the area, who owned land on and around Kinnaman Road and 185th Avenue. In 1893, the Wheeler Subdivision was platted. Trains started stopping in Wheeler in 1907, and a station was established on October 31 of that year. A school district was established in 1911.

On January 9, 1912, the post office would open, under the name Aloha. The community had first been called by that name as early as December 7, 1911, when The Hillsboro Argus reported the change of the name. According to Oregon Geographic Names, the origin of the name Aloha is disputed. Some sources say it was named by Robert Caples, a railroad worker, but it is unknown why the name was chosen. In 1983 Joseph H. Buck claimed that his uncle, the first postmaster, Julius Buck, named the office "Aloah" after a small resort on Lake Winnebago in Wisconsin. Supposedly the last two letters were transposed by the Post Office during the application process. The local pronunciation, however, has remained /əˈloʊ.ə/ rather than /əˈloʊhɑː/. A similar story is reported as early as 1949, in The Beaverton Enterprise.

Beginning in 1907, the area would be part of the site of the Beaverton-Reedville Acreage, a large suburban development by the Shaw-Fear Company. Much of the area around Aloha still follows the layout of this development.

From 1908 to 1929, intercity train services were provided to Aloha by Southern Pacific Red Electric Lines.

In 1960, the Aloha-Huber School district was merged into the Beaverton School District. At the time, the school district included both the Aloha-Huber and Beaver Acres elementary schools.

In 1976, Intel would open their Aloha plant, which was their first plant outside of California. This facility would be the site of a major solvent leakage in 1982, and the EPA would designate the Aloha campus a hazardous waste site in 1990. Fabrication Facility No. 4, one of the facilities on the campus opened in 1979, would close in 1996 and be demolished in 2016.

Aloha High School would be opened in 1970 as Beaverton School District's third high school.

Up until about 1975, the parks & recreation district in the area was the Aloha-Huber parks & Recreation District. However, this district would be merged into the Tualatin Hills Park & Recreation District in 1975. THPRD would open the Aloha Swim Center on the northwestern corner of the Aloha High School campus in October 1977.

The community attempted to incorporate in 1984, but the regional boundary commission halted the effort after determining the community could not provide the needed municipal services of a city.

As part of a 2000 bond project, Aloha High School would be expanded in 2005 with a 2-story addition on its south side.

A 2004 "interim plan" by Washington County and Beaverton would have had Beaverton eventually annex all of Aloha's area. The "interim" plan actually covered a period of more than ten years; from the county's perspective, However, this did not happen.

In 2012, a public library was opened in a space within a strip mall shopping center on Farmington Road at Kinnaman Road (previously anchored by Bales Thriftway until its closure in 2020). Named the Aloha Community Library, it was established by the non-profit Aloha Community Library Association and is staffed by volunteers. At the time of its opening, it had about 4,500 books. The library would become part of the Washington County Cooperative Library Services (WCCLS) in June 2016

== Geography ==
According to the United States Census Bureau, the CDP has a total area of 7.4 square miles (19 km^{2}), all land.

== Demographics ==
Historical population
Census	Pop.	Note	%±
1980	28,353		—
1990	34,284		20.9%
2000	41,741		21.8%
2010	49,425		18.4%
2020	53,828		8.9%

=== 2020 census ===
As of the 2020 census, Aloha had a population of 53,828. The median age was 35.8 years. 23.3% of residents were under the age of 18 and 11.8% of residents were 65 years of age or older. For every 100 females there were 99.6 males, and for every 100 females age 18 and over there were 98.2 males age 18 and over.

100.0% of residents lived in urban areas, while 0.0% lived in rural areas.

There were 18,547 households in Aloha, of which 35.4% had children under the age of 18 living in them. Of all households, 52.0% were married-couple households, 16.7% were households with a male householder and no spouse or partner present, and 22.4% were households with a female householder and no spouse or partner present. About 18.6% of all households were made up of individuals and 6.4% had someone living alone who was 65 years of age or older.

There were 19,094 housing units, of which 2.9% were vacant. The homeowner vacancy rate was 0.9% and the rental vacancy rate was 4.1%.

Racial composition as of the 2020 census
Race	Number	Percent
White	30,898	57.4%
Black or African American	1,776	3.3%
American Indian and Alaska Native	690	1.3%
Asian	6,082	11.3%
Native Hawaiian and Other Pacific Islander	406	0.8%
Some other race	6,833	12.7%
Two or more races	7,143	13.3%
Hispanic or Latino (of any race)	13,019	24.2%

=== 2000 census ===
As of the census of 2000, there were 41,741 people, 14,228 households, and 10,841 families residing in the community. The population density was 5,660.5 inhabitants per square mile (2,185.5/km^{2}). There were 14,851 housing units at an average density of 2,013.9 per square mile (777.6/km^{2}). The racial makeup of the CDP was 79.40% White, 1.35% African American, 0.78% Native American, 7.69% Asian, 0.37% Pacific Islander, 6.70% from other races, and 3.72% from two or more races. Hispanic or Latino of any race were 12.93% of the population. There were 14,228 households, out of which 42.9% had children under the age of 18 living with them, 59.4% were married couples living together, 11.6% had a female householder with no husband present, and 23.8% were non-families. 16.9% of all households were made up of individuals, and 3.5% had someone living alone who was 65 years of age or older. The average household size was 2.92 and the average family size was 3.28.

In the community, the population was spread out, with 29.8% under the age of 18, 9.1% from 18 to 24, 35.0% from 25 to 44, 20.3% from 45 to 64, and 5.7% who were 65 years of age or older. The median age was 31 years. For every 100 females, there were 101.5 males. For every 100 females age 18 and over, there were 99.8 males.

The median income for a household in the community was $52,299, and the median income for a family was $56,566. Males had a median income of $40,369 versus $29,921 for females. The per capita income for the community was $19,685. About 5.6% of families and 7.9% of the population were below the poverty line, including 9.4% of those under age 18 and 5.2% of those age 65 or over.

== Education ==
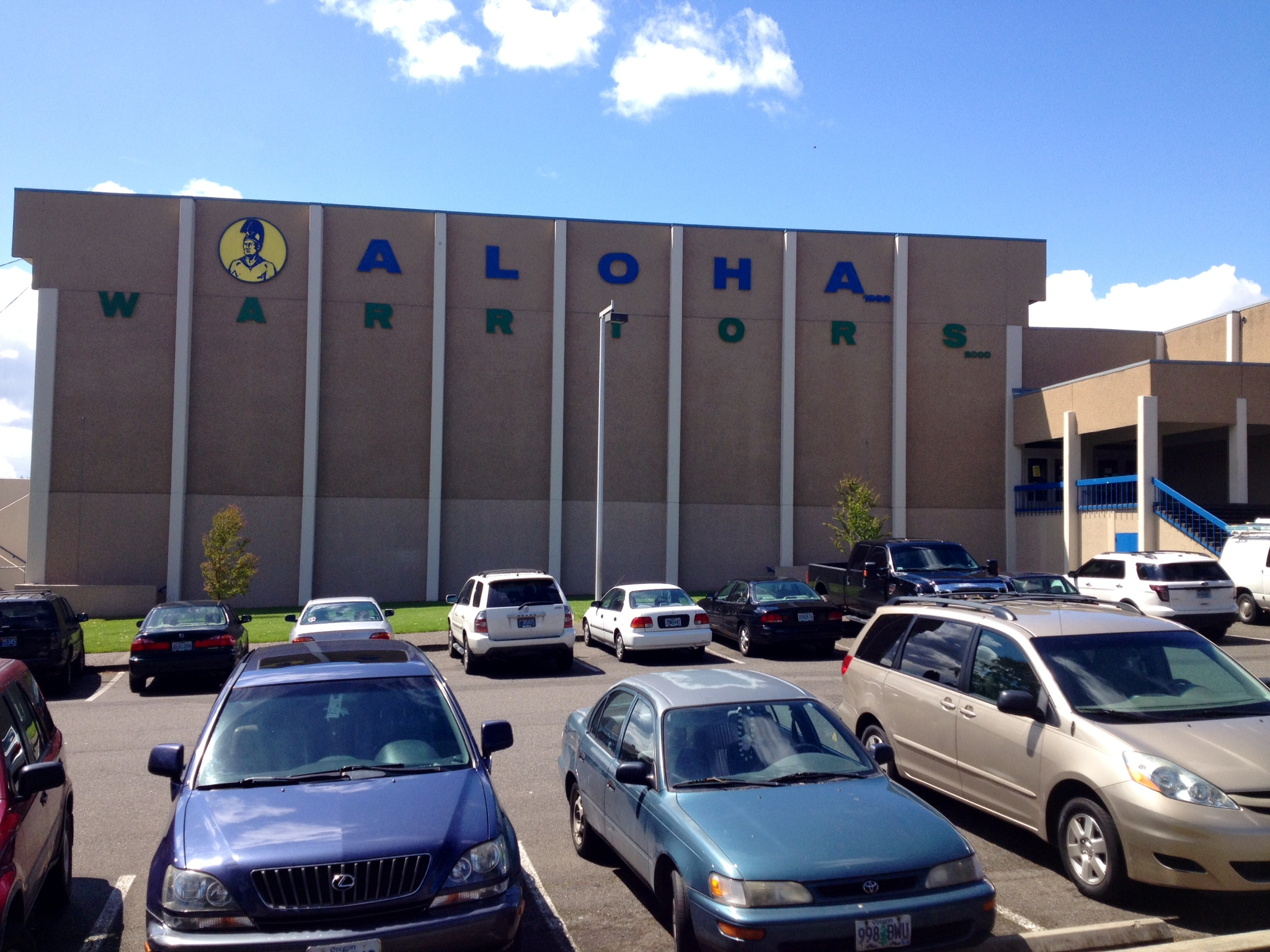
Aloha High School

Aloha is served by the Beaverton and Hillsboro school districts in two different portions.

Beaverton schools in the area include Aloha High School and the International School of Beaverton. Aloha is served by Mountain View and Five Oaks middle schools and Aloha-Huber Park, Beaver Acres, Cooper Mountain, Errol Hassell, Hazeldale, and Kinnaman elementary schools.

Hillsboro schools serving Aloha include Century High School, R. A. Brown middle school, and Butternut Creek, Imlay, Indian Hills, Ladd Acres, Reedville, and Tobias elementary schools.

Private schools in or near Aloha include Life Christian School, Palace of Praise Academy, and the elementary campus of Faith Bible Christian School.

== Notable people ==
- Jeff Barker, Oregon State Representative
- Jensen Huang, Founder and former CEO of Nvidia
- Loren Parks, Businessman, founder of Parks Medical Electronics, and political donor

== See also ==
- M. E. Blanton House
