= The LaSells Stewart Center =

Building on the Oregon State University campus in Corvallis, Oregon, U.S.

Coordinates: 44.559128°N 123.278964°W

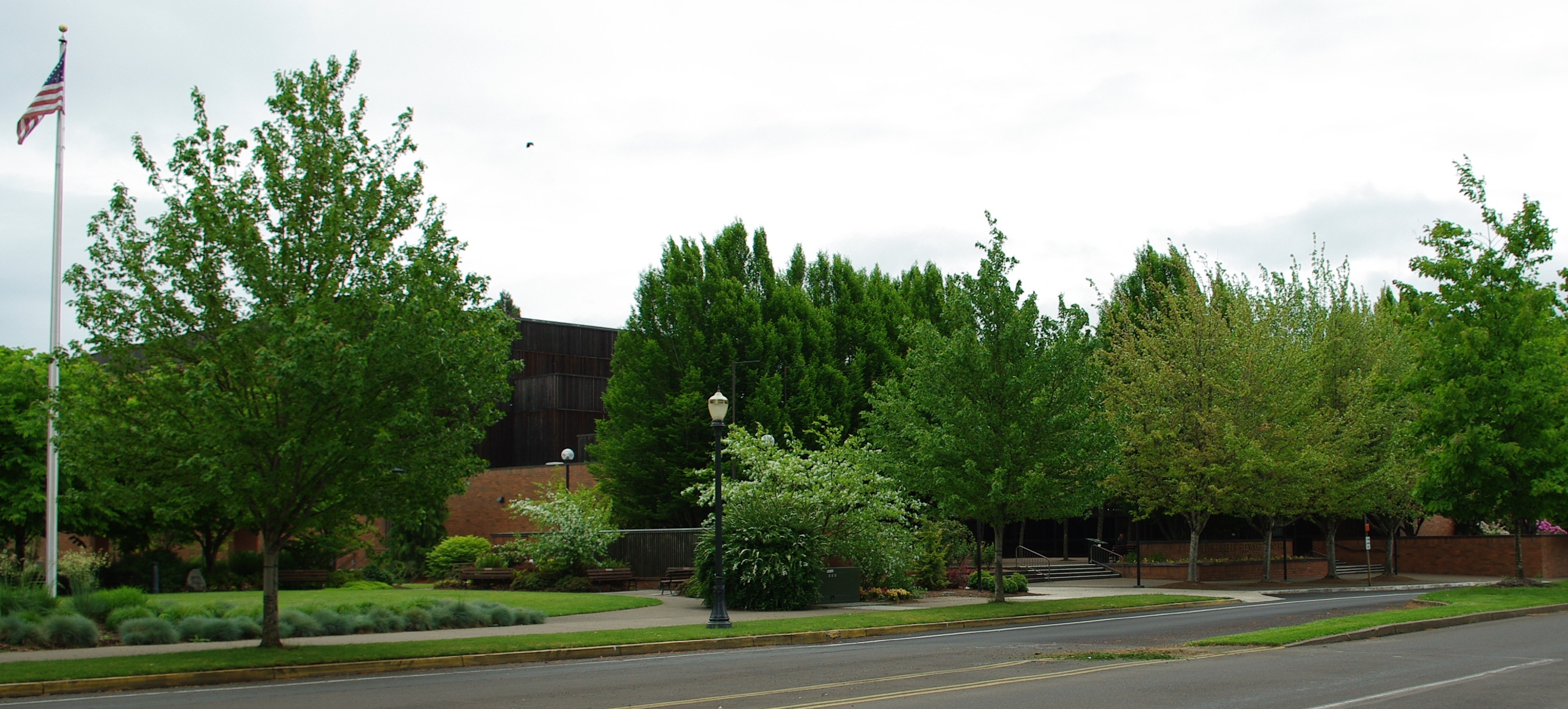
- Interactive map of the The LaSells Stewart Center area

General information
- Type: performing arts; conference
- Location: Corvallis, Oregon, U.S.

Website
- lasells.oregonstate.edu

The LaSells Stewart Center is the performing arts and conference center on the Oregon State University campus in Corvallis, Oregon, USA. The Stewart Family donated the money used to construct the center, and it is dedicated to the memory of LaSells Stewart.

Facilities inside of The LaSells Stewart Center include; the Austin Auditorium, the Construction and Engineering Hall, the Giustina Gallery, the Agriculture Production Room/Agriculture Leaders Room/Agriculture Science Room, the Wells Fargo Room and the Weyerhaeuser Board Room.

Giustina Gallery, located in the lobby of The LaSells Stewart Center, showcases artwork from local and national artists, as well as faculty and students of Oregon State University. Hours are Monday-Friday from 8 a.m.- 5 p.m.
