= Faith Bible High School =

Location
- 8975 NE Walker Road #120; Hillsboro, Oregon 97006; United States; 45.5358°N 122.8871°W

Information
- Type: private
- Religious affiliation: Christian (nondenominational)
- Founded: 1976
- Grades: 9-12
- Enrollment: 148
- Campus: Suburban
- Colors: Navy blue & white
- Athletics conference: OSAA 2A-1 Northwest League
- Mascot: Falcon
- Team name: Falcons
- Accreditation: NAAS
- Website: www.fbcs.school
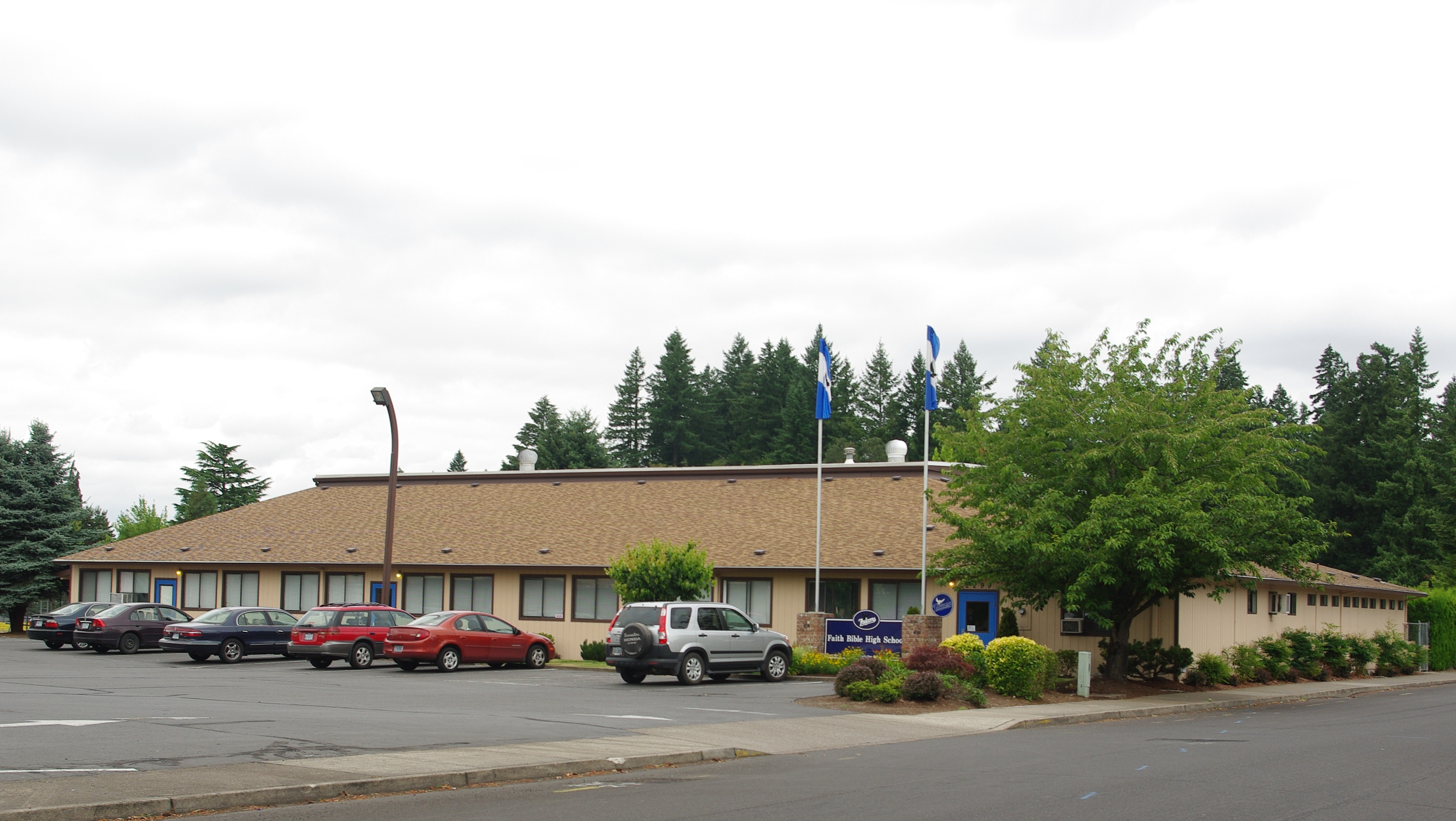

Faith Bible High School is a private, nondenominational Christian school in Hillsboro, Oregon, United States. Opened in 1976, the school offers classes from ninth through twelfth grade. The school is part of the Faith Bible Christian School that has a second campus where preschool through eighth grade are taught. The high school is accredited by the Northwest Association of Accredited Schools, and in sports is a member of the Oregon School Activities Association where they compete at the 2A level in the Northwest League as the Falcons.

== History ==
Faith Bible Christian School was founded in 1976 as part of the Faith Bible Church. The school later became a nondenominational Christian school. The school offered classes from preschool through twelfth grade. The lower grades are held on a campus in Aloha, with high school classes on the Hillsboro campus along the Tualatin Valley Highway. The high school moved to its present location in 1996. Faith Bible High School became accredited by the Northwest Association of Accredited Schools (NAAS) in 2000.

In February 2001, a student at the high school received a threat via AOL Instant Messenger, threatening to kill the student at school. Due to the threat, the school canceled classes for the day. Later police determined the incident was partly a hoax as the student knew the person making the threats, and the two were in competition with each other for the affections of a girl. Enrollment at the school at that time was about 150, and stood at 148 in 2007. In 2009, the school was a Picturing America Award recipient. The school moved to the AmberGlen area of northeast Hillsboro in April 2018.

== Academics ==
Faith Bible High School is a member of the Association of Christian Schools International and has grades nine through twelve at the coeducational school. The school has a staff of 12 on the 3-acre (1.2 ha) campus, and holds classes 180 days per year. The campus consists of four modular buildings and one main building, which together house a gymnasium, media center (library), computer lab, and classrooms. As of 2018, the school had 499 students, of which twelfth grade was the largest class with 59 students, while second grade was the smallest with 23 students. Demographically, there were 417 white students, 22 Asian students, 15 Hispanic students, and 13 Black students in the student body.

The school promotes a family atmosphere on the campus. The school also offers the Faces of Faith drama group that presents plays for the community at large. The group is for students that are unable to attend the school’s drama classes. The school also participates in the National Honor Society, a program that recognizes students with superior academic achievement.

== Athletics ==
Faith Bible's team logo

Faith Bible’s teams are known as the Falcons and have navy blue and white as their official colors. Teams compete at the 2A level primarily in the Oregon School Activities Association’s Northwest League. For some fall sports, teams compete in a special district that spans several OSAA classifications. In the fall season, teams are fielded in boys and girls soccer, volleyball, and boy and girls cross-country. Winter sports are boys and girls basketball, and the spring sports are boys and girls track. The school used to have a co-ed baseball team, but is currently not available for students.
