= Hollie Pihl =

American judge

Holger "Hollie" Pihl
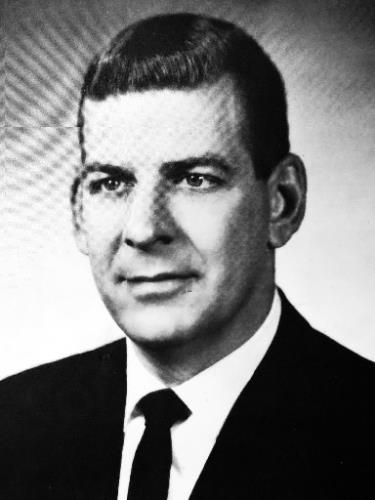

Circuit Court Judge
- Nominated by: Tom McCall

District Court Judge for Washington County
- Nominated by: John Kitzhaber

Senior Judge for the State of Oregon

Personal details
- Born: Holger Mathew Pihl; September 23, 1928 Portland, Oregon, U.S.
- Died: October 3, 2018 (aged 90) Manning, Oregon, U.S.
- Spouse: Alice Pihl (m. 1958)
- Children: 5
- Education: University of Oregon (B.S.); Northwestern Law School (LLB)

Holger Mathew Pihl Jr. (September 23, 1928 – October 3, 2018) was the Circuit Court Judge of Washington County, Oregon, until 1995, and then a Senior Judge until his retirement in 2005. He was appointed to the court by Oregon Governor Tom McCall in 1976.

Pihl was born in Portland, Oregon. He graduated from the University of Oregon in 1950 and obtained his law degree from Northwestern Law School in Chicago in 1954. Pihl founded his own law practice in 1955, and soon after found a love for politics that would guide his future career ambitions.

In 1959, Pihl ran as a Republican for the Oregon House of Representatives, and lost to Republican nominee Vic Atiyeh, who would later go on to serve as the 32nd Governor of Oregon. In 1960, Pihl ran for District Attorney of Washington County and won, staying in that position until Governor Tom McCall appointed him to District Court Judge in 1968, and to Circuit Court Judge in 1979. Pihl served on the court in his position as Circuit Court Judge until 1995, when he elected to stay on as a Senior Judge until his retirement in 2005.

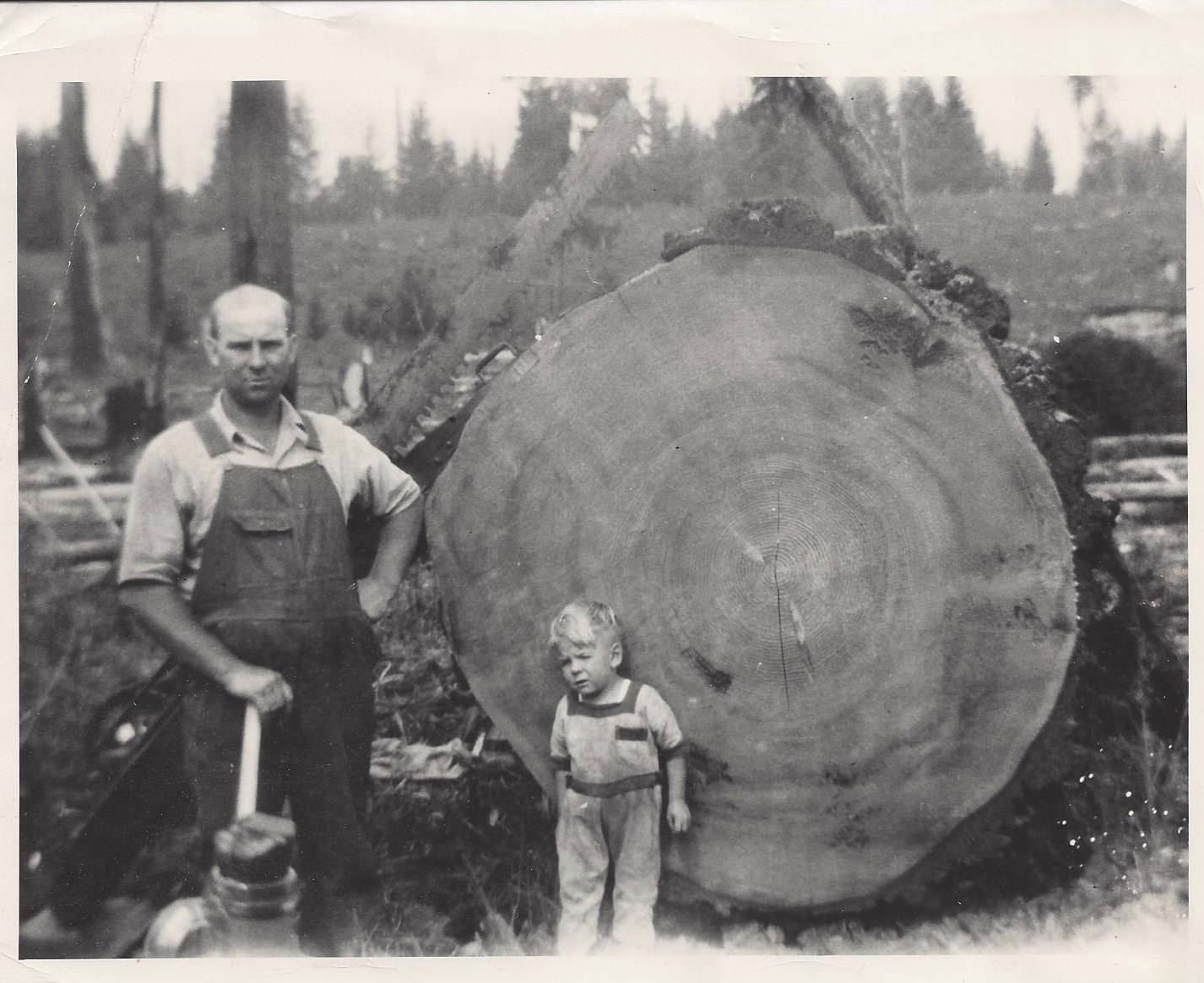
Hollie Pihl (child) with his uncle Chris cutting down his first tree on his father's 1,000-acre (400 ha) tree farm in Manning, Oregon

== Early life and education ==
Hollie Pihl was born on September 23, 1928, in Portland, Oregon, and was one of six children. His father, Holger Mathew Pihl Sr. (known to his friends as Matt Pihl), a Danish immigrant from Copenhagen, came to the United States through Ellis Island in New York City in 1906. Matt Pihl joined his brothers Chris and Pete, and obtained a job taking care of dairy cows in Dilley, Oregon.

Matt Pihl purchased acreage on Green Mountain, near the town of Manning, eventually amassing nearly 1,000 acres (400 ha) of forestland by the time his son Hollie had been born. At this point, the Pihl family lived in St. Johns, Oregon, and used the Manning land for logging and had a small saw mill. Hollie, as a youth, learned to fall and buck, and run a chainsaw with the best of them. At the time of Hollie Pihl's birth in 1928, his family also owned two trucking companies in Portland; Pihl Trucking and Green Transfer Trucking. Hollie spent many years working for his parents' trucking companies and always thought he would be a truck driver.

Hollie Pihl was born with one eye pupil turned in and was the subject of much teasing when he was a student at James John Grade School, and later at Roosevelt High School. While attending Roosevelt High School, Pihl had earned enough money to finally have surgery on his eye, but when he visited the doctor, he found out it was too late to save the vision in that eye.

In 1946, with little money to his name and not nearly enough money to attend college, Hollie Pihl took advantage of the G.I. Bill and joined the United States Army during the Korean War. To pass the medical exam, which he would have failed with only one working eye, Pihl lied and said he had near perfect vision, and spent extra hours training with a firearm to perfect his shooting. He served in the Army until 1948 when he had fulfilled his time and decided he wanted to attend the University of Oregon.

Pihl began attending the University of Oregon in 1948 at the age of 20, and graduated with a degree four years later, in 1952. To continue to pay for his education and costs, Pihl worked for his father's trucking companies in Portland during the summers. After graduating from the University of Oregon, Pihl attended Northwestern University School of Law in Chicago, obtaining a law degree in 1955, at which point he took the Oregon Bar and began his law career in with his friend, Don Buss, in Portland, Oregon. Soon after, Pihl began to discover his ambitions to serve the United States government rather than stay in the private sector.

== Legal career ==
Hollie Pihl began his legal career in 1955, practicing law in a firm with partner Donald A. Buss, forming Buss & Pihl. He left the firm to launch his campaign for the Oregon House of Representatives in 1962

Pihl ran as a Republican in the 1962 election, losing to fellow Republican Vic Atiyeh in the primary elections. Atiyeh would go on to serve in the House of Representatives from 1959 to 1964, and in the Oregon State Senate from 1965 to 1978, eventually becoming the 32nd Governor of Oregon after defeating fellow Republican Tom McCall in the 1978 primary.

After his defeat, Pihl ran for District Attorney in Washington County in 1964 and won, staying on in his position until Governor Tom McCall appointed him to District Court Judge in 1967, and to Circuit Court Judge in 1969 where he stayed on in his full-time position until he was designated a senior judge of the state by the Supreme Court, making him eligible for temporary assignment by the Supreme Court. He stayed on in this position until his retirement in 2005.

=== Notable cases ===
- State v. Koennecke (1975)
- Alice Cameron (1975)
- Redden v. Pihl (1977)
- Frostig v. Saga Enterprises, Inc (1975) Supreme Court of Oregon
- Case of Ernest Everett Ayers (c. 1980): Pihl sentenced double-rapist Ayers (both in 1980) to 105 years in prison; Ayers escaped repeatedly over the next 25 years
- Case of Michael Sture (1981): Pihl sentenced Sture, the confessed (to avoid the death penalty) murderer of an off-duty Oregon State Police officer, to serve his "natural life" in prison, rather than the less specific "minimum of 25 years".
- Emery v. State (1984) Supreme Court of Oregon
- Richard Burgess v. Hollie Pihl (1989)
- Oregon v. Robinson (1991)
- Ruling on Tri-Met Expansion (1993) - In this ruling, Pihl made headlines by allowing the TriMet railway to run beneath two cemeteries, connecting Washington Country to Portland in a $558 million dollar project. The judge rejected the complaints of the cemetery owners and families of people buried in the hillside plots that the constant rumble of commuter trains would disturb the graves.
- State v. Green (2005): Pihl ruled Oregon anti-stalking law was unconstitutional

== Personal life ==
In 1958, Pihl married Alice Morrow, a nurse whom he met on a blind date, in Portland, Oregon. In 1962, the Pihls moved onto his tree farm in Manning, Oregon, and raised five children, all attending Banks High School.

=== Boy Scouts of America ===
Pihl was heavily involved in the Boy Scouts of America for many years. In the 1980s, Pihl served as a Vice President of the Columbia Pacific Council, now known as Cascade Pacific Council, making up most of the Portland area. He was also responsible for naming the newly formed Tuality District. In 1991, Pihl was awarded the Silver Beaver Award for showing exceptional leadership and service to the Boy Scouts of America. His daughter Becky, a Deputy District Attorney in Washington County and her son participated in Scouting where she remains active to this day. Jacob earned his Eagle Award in 2009 and, in 2017, Becky became the second person in her family line to earn the Silver Beaver Award.
