= Dilley, Oregon =

Unincorporated community in the state of Oregon, United States

- Unincorporated community
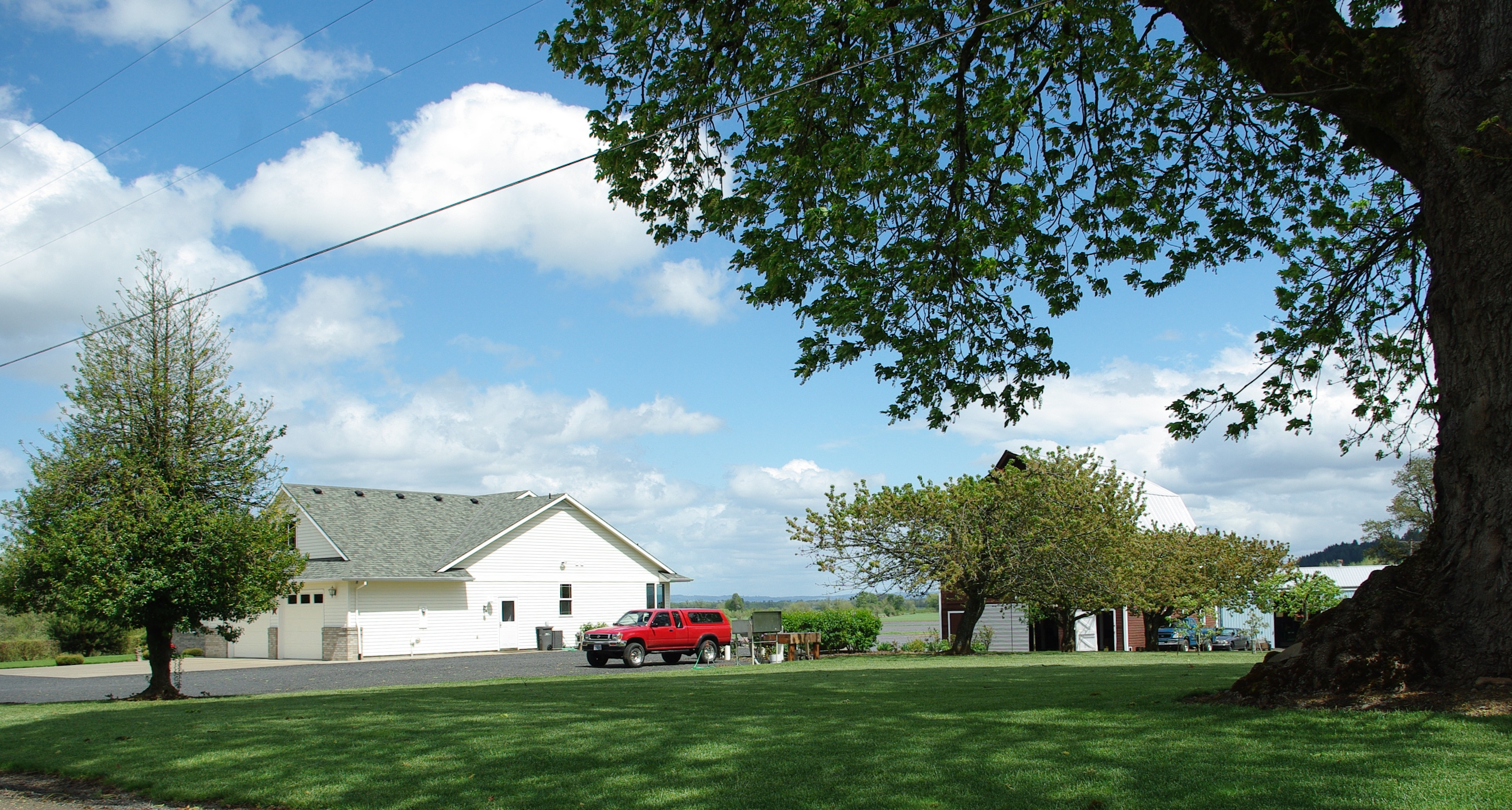
- Home and barn in Dilley

- Location within the state of Oregon Dilley, Oregon (the United States)
- Coordinates: 45°29′30″N 123°07′20″W
- Country: United States
- State: Oregon
- County: Washington

Area
  - Total: 0.75 sq mi (1.94 km^{2})
  - Land: 0.75 sq mi (1.94 km^{2})
  - Water: 0 sq mi (0.00 km^{2})
- Elevation: 187 ft (57 m)

Population (2020)
  - Total: 301
  - Density: 402.3/sq mi (155.31/km^{2})
- Time zone: UTC-8 (Pacific (PST))
  - Summer (DST): UTC-7 (PDT)
- ZIP code: 97116
- Area codes: 503 and 971
- FIPS code: 41-19650
- GNIS feature ID: 2812898

Dilley is an unincorporated community in Washington County, Oregon, United States. As of the 2020 census, Dilley had a population of 301. It is located south of Forest Grove and north of the city of Gaston on Oregon Route 47 in the Portland metropolitan area. Settled in the late 1840s, the community was platted in 1874 after the arrival of the railroad.

== History ==
Horace and Marilda Parsons settled in the area located south of Forest Grove in 1849. In 1850, Parsons built a grist mill along the Tualatin River near what later became Dilley on the land claim of William Owen Gibson. Gibson settled his claim in 1847, and built the log cabin used for Tabitha Moffatt Brown’s orphan school that later became Pacific University. Dilley School District 10 was established in 1860, with a school built on the north end of the town that same year. A flour mill was added nearby in 1863, and Joseph Gaston’s West Side Railroad reached the area in 1872. James C. Chamberlain, was the first postmaster of the post office established on December 31, 1873.

On March 18, 1874, Milton E. and Martha Dilley platted the area that became Dilley Station. They created the town on the Donation Land Claim of the Chatfield family. The Dilleys arrived in 1853, with Milton buying 140 acres (0.57 km^{2}) in the area. The original plat had east-west running streets of A through D and north-south running streets of First through Fourth. There were 13 lots along the roads that varied from 30 feet (9.1 m) wide to 60 feet (18 m) wide. Other businesses in the community in the early years were a barber shop, general stores, ice warehouse, and a blacksmith among others.

In 1880, a Mr. McLeod and two sons built a sawmill in the area. In 1895, 23 years after the railroad reached the area, a station was built in Dilley. The Methodist Church in town was established in 1896, and circa 1953, the Bible Church of Dilley was started. Other businesses at one time included a hotel, dance hall, saloons, machine shop, and a hardware store. Circa 1961, the Dilley post office was closed. At one time, the town had a band and baseball team. In 1967, the last store and gas station were torn down when Oregon Route 47 was rerouted. By 1976 the school was consolidated into the Forest Grove School District. In 1998, the community made national news when a convicted sex offender was scheduled to live in the community at his mother's home. Neighbors objected, and purchased the home to prevent the offender from moving to Dilley.

== Details ==
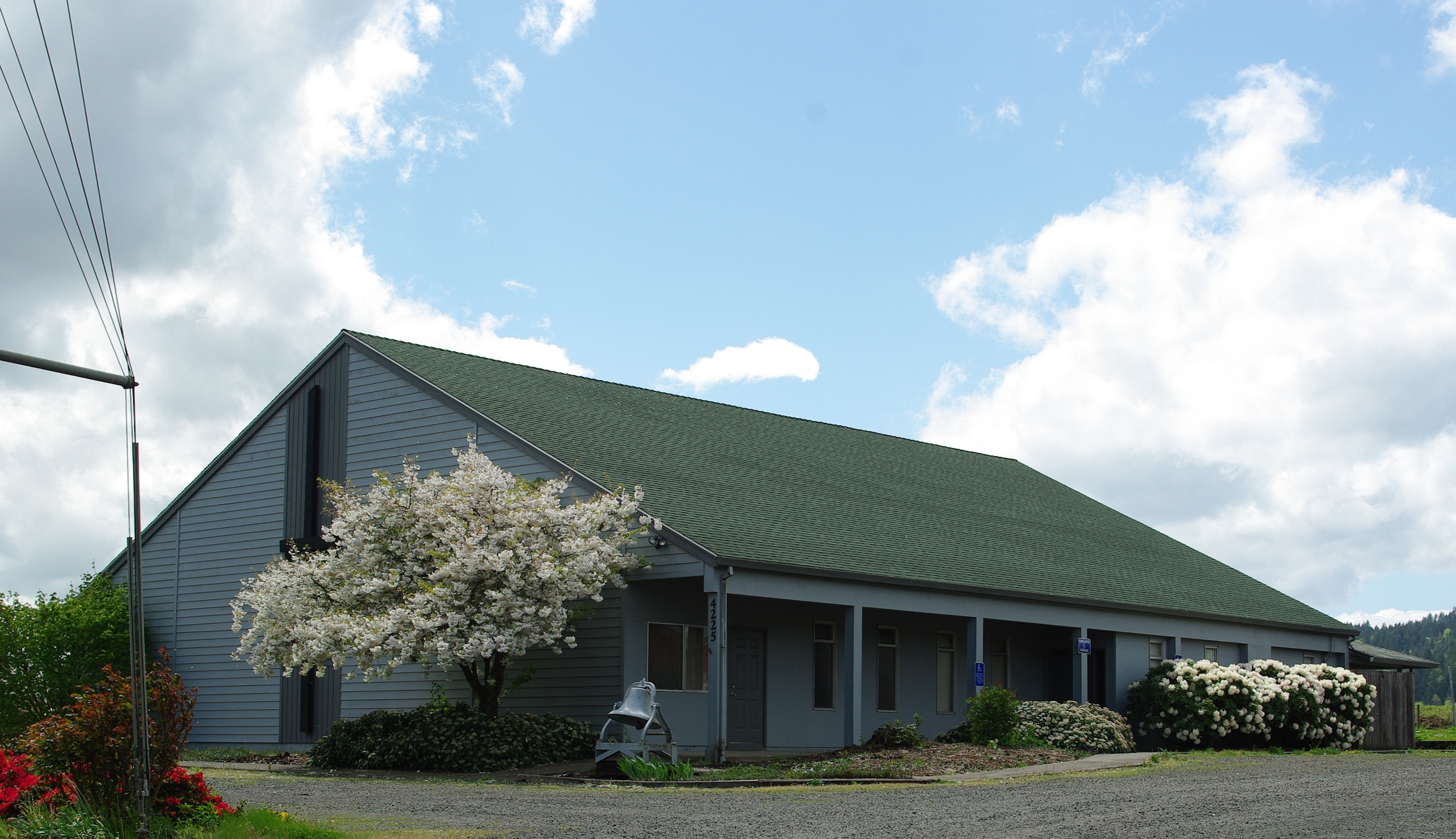
Church in Dilley

Dilley Elementary School, part of the Forest Grove School District, received a rating of exceptional by the state for the first six years of the state rankings. The community has one church, Bible Church of Dilley. Dilley is part of the Forest Grove Rural Fire Protection District. Oregon House of Representatives District 26 (Matt Wingard) and Oregon Senate District 13 (Larry George) cover the community. Dilley is within Oregon's 1st congressional district, represented in Congress by Suzanne Bonamici.

As of 2000, the estimated population of the area was as high as 2000 people, though there are no defined boundaries for the community. The community has the Forest Grove ZIP Code of 97116, and area codes 503 and 971. The main roads in the area include Oregon Route 47 (also known as Tualatin Valley Highway) that runs north-south, along with southwest Anderson and Dilley roads. Dilley, classified as a populated place, sits at an elevation of 197 feet (60 m) above sea level. The U.S. Geologic Survey operates a water gauge on the Tualatin River at Dilley.

== Demographics ==
Historical population
Census	Pop.	Note	%±
2020	301		—
U.S. Decennial Census

== Education ==
It is in the Forest Grove School District.
