= Zigzag (disambiguation) =

A Zigzag is a jagged, regular pattern.

Zigzag, ZigZag, zig zag or zig-zag may also refer to:

== Film and television ==
- Zigzag (1963 film)
- Zig Zag (1970 film), a film by Richard A. Colla
- Zig Zag (2002 film), a film by David S. Goyer
- Zig Zag (Canadian TV series)
- Zig Zag, an educational TV series on BBC Schools
- Zigzag, a character in The Thief and the Cobbler
- "Zig Zag", an episode of The Outer Limits, season 6

== Music and theatre ==
- Zig-Zag!, a 1917 musical revue
- Zig Zag (The Hooters album) (1989)
- Zig Zag (Tha Mexakinz album) (1994)
- Zig Zag, a 2003 album by Earl Slick
- Zig Zags, a heavy metal/punk rock band
- Shintenchi Kaibyaku Shudan: Zigzag, a Japanese visual-kei band
- "Zig-Zag", a 2025 single by Takane Lui

== Culture ==
- ZigZag (magazine), a UK rock music magazine
- Zig Zag (manga), a cartoon series by Yuki Nakaji
- Zigzag (surfing magazine)

== Computer science ==
- ZigZag (software), a data model designed and patented by Ted Nelson
- Zig-zag product, a method for constructing graphs in computational complexity
- Zig-Zag, a tree-rotation variant used to balance splay trees
- Zig-zag entropy coding, a method used in JPEG images to compress data
- ZigZag encoding, a mapping of the signed integers to unsigned integers that shortens variable-length quantity representations of negative integers

== Geography ==
- Zig Zag Pass, site of the Struggle on Zig Zag Pass in the Philippines during World War II
- Zigzag, Oregon
  - Zigzag Glacier
  - Zigzag Ranger Station
  - Zigzag River and Little Zigzag River
- Zigzag Bluff in Antarctica
- Zigzag Island off the coast of Antarctica
- Zigzag Pass on the island of South Georgia

== Mathematics and cryptography ==
- Boustrophedon transform, a zigzag reordering
- Fence (mathematics) or zigzag poset, a partially ordered set
- Isbell's zigzag theorem
- Zig-zag lemma, a mathematical lemma in homological algebra
- Zigzag cipher, a type of cipher, or code

== Railroads ==
- Zig zag (railway), a construction technique railroads use to climb hills; also called a switchback
- Lapstone Zig Zag, a walking track on the line of an abandoned railway
- Zig Zag Railway, a heritage railway near Lithgow
- Zig Zag railway station, a railway station on the CityRail network near Lithgow, New South Wales
- Kalamunda Zig Zag in Western Australia
- Perry Bridge or Zig Zag Bridge, a 1711 bridge over River Tame in Perry Barr, Birmingham, England

== Revolvers ==
- Mauser Zig-Zag, a 19th-century revolver
- Zig zag revolver, a 3D-printed revolver developed in Japan

== Architecture ==
- Zig-Zag Chair, designed by Gerrit Rietveld
- Zig-zag moulding on Norman arches
- Zigzag Moderne, a style and feature of Art Deco architecture

== Animals ==
- Phasianella zigzag, a species of sea snail
- Northern zigzag salamander
- Ozark zigzag salamander
- Southern zigzag salamander
- Zigzag barb, a ray-finned fish
- Zigzag heron, a bird
- Zigzagiceras, an extinct cephalopod genus
- Zig zag (lizard), a species of reptile

== Other uses ==
- Boustrophedon, writing in alternating directions
- Zig Zag (1984 video game), a video game by DK'Tronics
- Zig Zag (1987 video game), a video game by Mirrorsoft
- Zig-Zag (company), a tobacco products company
- Zig-zag bridge, a type of pedestrian walkway
- USS Zigzag (SP-106), a patrol vessel that served in the United States Navy from 1917 to 1919
- Agent Zigzag, code name of Eddie Chapman, a British double agent
- Zig-zag in-line package, a short-lived packaging technology for integrated circuits
- Zigzag transformer, an engineering device for electrical systems
- ZigZag, a ticketing scheme in Derbyshire, UK, by bus operator Trent Barton
- Zig Zag Girl, a stage magic illusion
- The zigzag model of plant-pathogen co-evolution by Jonathan D. G. Jones and Jeffery Dangl
- Isbell's zigzag theorem

== See also ==
- Zag (disambiguation)
- Zig (disambiguation)
- Zig and Zag (disambiguation)
- Zik Zak Filmworks
