= Zigzag Mountain =

Volcanic mountain in Clackamas County, Oregon, United States

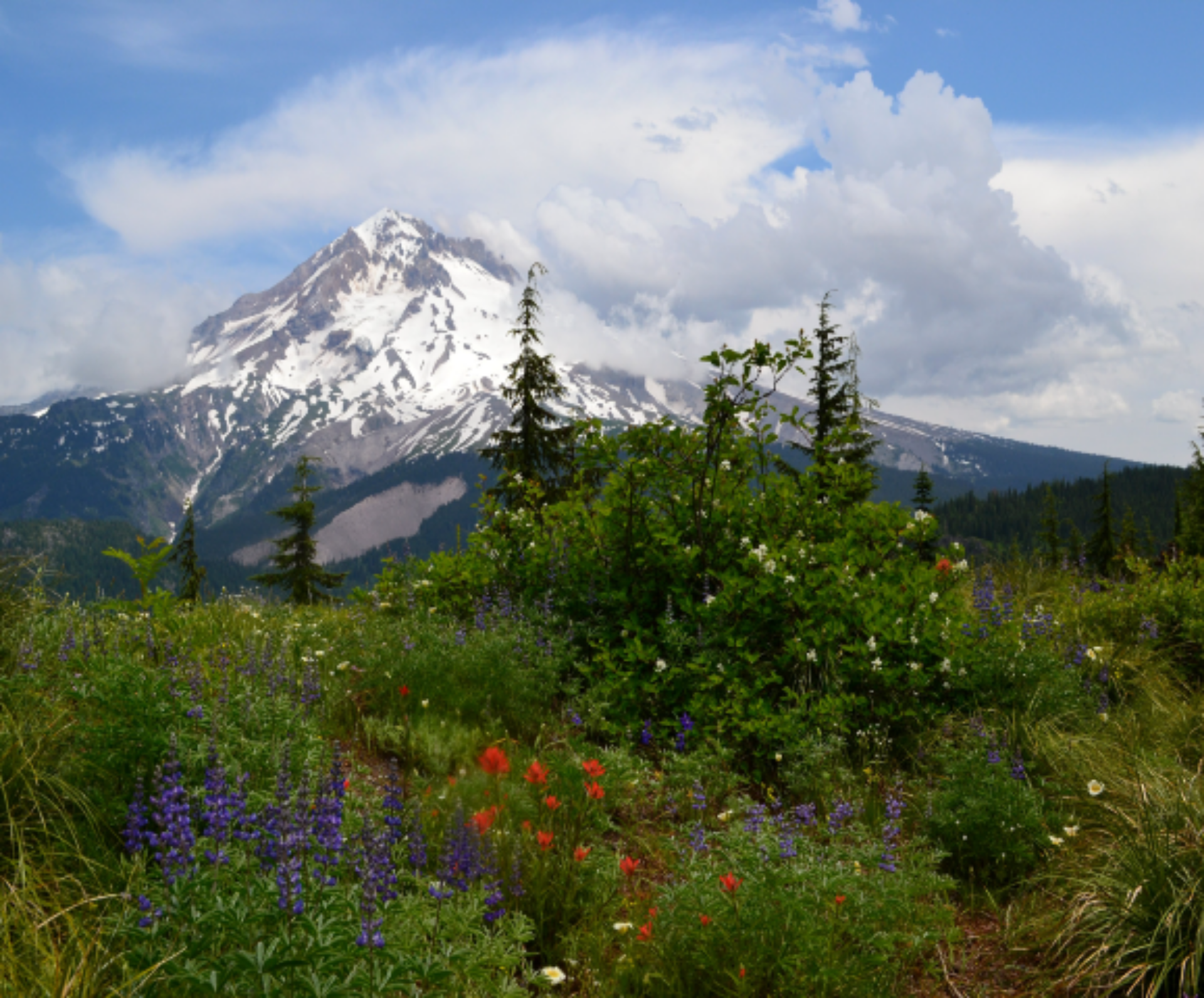
- View of Mount Hood from east Zigzag Mountain

Highest point
- Elevation: 5004+ ft (1525+ m) NAVD 88
- Prominence: 480 ft (146 m)
- Parent peak: Mount Hood
- Coordinates: 45°20′46″N 121°50′17″W

Geography
- Location within Oregon
- Location: Clackamas County, Oregon, U.S.
- Parent range: Cascades
- Topo map: USGS Government Camp

Zigzag Mountain is a volcanic mountain in Clackamas County in the U.S. state of Oregon. It is located 7.1 miles (11.4 km) west-southwest of Mount Hood, 5.2 miles (8.4 km) northwest of Government Camp, 5.3 miles (8.5 km) east of Zigzag, and north of the Zigzag River. Because of its proximity to Mount Hood, it is considered a foothill.

The highest peak has an elevation of over 5,007 feet (1,526 m). Another peak, East Zigzag, is 4,973 feet (1,516 m) and was the site of a United States Forest Service fire lookout station which was destroyed prior to 1970. The mountain is capped by Pliocene andesite and basalt.

The "Zigzag" name used was apparently derived from Oregon pioneer Joel Palmer's description of the zigzagging route he used to descend from Mount Hood's Zigzag Canyon (in which Zigzag Glacier is located) and on down what is now Zigzag Mountain.

== See also ==
- Little Zigzag River
- Zigzag, Oregon
- Zigzag Ranger Station
- Zigzag River
