= Little Zigzag River =

River US state of Oregon

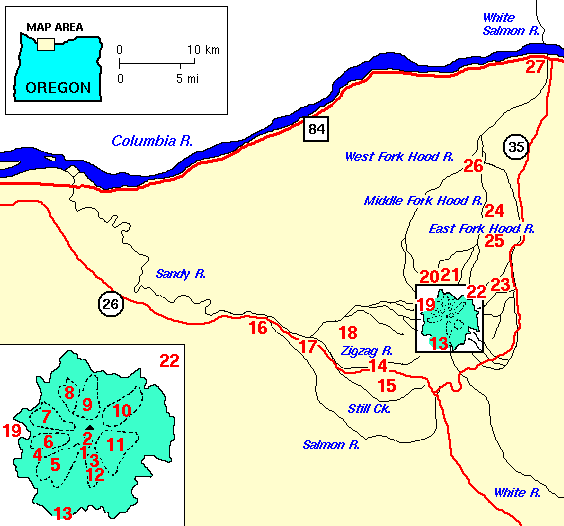
- Mount Hood and vicinity

- Location of the mouth of the Little Zigzag River in Oregon
- Etymology: After the Zigzag River, from the description by Joel Palmer, an Oregon pioneer, of his descent in 1845 of a river canyon, later called Zigzag Canyon, that begins on Mount Hood.

Location
- Country: United States
- State: Oregon
- County: Clackamas County

Physical characteristics
- Source: Zigzag Glacier
  - location: Mount Hood
  - coordinates: 45°20′52″N 121°43′03″W
  - elevation: 6,989 ft (2,130 m)
- Mouth: Zigzag River
  - location: Oregon
  - coordinates: 45°18′45″N 121°47′58″W
  - elevation: 3,071 ft (936 m)
- Length: 5 mi (8.0 km)

The Little Zigzag River is a tributary, about 5 miles (8.0 km) long, of the Zigzag River in the U.S. state of Oregon. The Zigzag and Little Zigzag drain the Zigzag Glacier on Mount Hood, a high volcanic peak in the Cascade Range. Their combined waters flow westward to meet the Sandy River near the community of Zigzag. Little Zigzag Falls, a popular hiking destination, is on the river near U.S. Route 26 east of Zigzag.

== Course ==
The river begins at the head of Little Zigzag Canyon at the southern end of the Zigzag Glacier on Mount Hood. The upper stretches of the river lie within the Mount Hood Wilderness, which is part of the Mount Hood National Forest. To the river's right are the Mississippi Head escarpment, the head of Zigzag Canyon, and the source of the Zigzag River, which also drains Zigzag Glacier. To the Little Zigzag's left is the Palmer Glacier. From its source, the river flows southwest and crosses the Timberline Trail and the Pacific Crest Trail (PCT) slightly west of Timberline Lodge.

Downstream of the PCT, the river runs roughly parallel to the Hidden Lake Trail, which follows a ridge to the right of the canyon. Sand Canyon and its stream, to the left, enter the Little Zigzag as it passes near Hidden Lake, which is on the right. Shortly thereafter, the river leaves the wilderness, turns west, and passes near U.S. Route 26, which is on the river's left. Over its last stretch, the river flows by Mt. Hood Kiwanis Camp, which is on the left, passes under Kiwanis Camp Road (Forest Road 39), and enters the Zigzag River.

Falling 3,918 feet (1,194 m) between source and mouth, the stream has an average gradient of about 800 feet per mile (150 m/km). Little Zigzag Falls, a popular hiking destination, lies 0.3 miles (0.48 km) east of a parking lot at the end of Forest Road 39.

== See also ==
- List of rivers of Oregon
- Zigzag Mountain
- Zigzag, Oregon
- Zigzag Ranger Station
- Zigzag River
