= Zigzag Glacier =

Glacier in Oregon, United States

- Location within Oregon
- Type: Mountain glacier
- Location: Clackamas County, Oregon, U.S.
- Coordinates: 45°21′48″N 121°42′44″W
- Area: 190 acres (77 ha)
- Length: 1.5 mi (2.4 km)
- Terminus: Talus
- Status: Retreating

Zigzag Glacier is an alpine glacier located on the upper southwest slopes of Mount Hood in the U.S. state of Oregon. It ranges in elevation from 10,200 to 7,200 feet (3,100 to 2,200 m) with fingers in canyons extending to about 6,400 feet (2,000 m), and lies almost entirely within Mount Hood Wilderness. The upper extent is divided from Reid Glacier by Illumination Rock. The top of the glacier is at the foot of Crater Rock.

The glacier is bounded on the east by a slight rise shared with the Palmer Glacier (a popular skiing area north of Timberline Lodge since the 1930s) and on the northwest by Reid Glacier. It is the source of the Zigzag River which has eroded a large, steep canyon named Zigzag Canyon. Below the glacier, its snowfield varies significantly seasonally, varying in length by almost two miles (3.2 km).

In 1922, a jökulhlaup originating from Zigzag Glacier as a flow of dark debris came out of a crevasse high on the glacier. It flowed on the surface more than 650 m (2100 ft) before entering another crevasse, and precipitated a minor panic by those who thought Mount Hood was erupting.

== See also ==
- List of glaciers in the United States
- Little Zigzag River
- Zigzag Mountain
- Zigzag, Oregon
- Zigzag Ranger Station
- Zigzag River
