= Zig =

Zig may refer to:

== Places ==
- Zığ, Baku, Azerbaijan
- Zig, Iran, a village in Razavi Khorasan Province, Iran

== Fictional entities ==
- Zig, the spaceship from the video game Zero Wing
- Zig, one half of the puppet comedy duo puppets Zig and Zag
- Zig, one of the main characters from the French comic strip Zig et Puce
- Zig, one of the main characters from the French animated series Zig & Sharko
- Zigs (film), a 2001 gambling film directed by Mars Callahan
- Zig Novak, from Degrassi and Degrassi: Next Class

== People ==
- Zig, one half of Australian comedy duo Zig and Zag, played by Jack Perry (1916–2006)
- Zig Jackson (born 1957), Native American (Mandan/Hidatsa/Arikara) photographer
- Zig Ziglar (1926–2012), American self-help author and speaker
- Eliza Archard Conner (pen name Zig; 1838–1912), American writer

== Other uses ==
- Ziz or Zig, a giant griffin-like bird in Jewish mythology
- Zig (programming language), a general-purpose programming language
- Zoster immunoglobulin, an immune system medication
- Zig (album), 2023 studio album by Poppy, or the title track
- Zig Media, American mobile-media technology company
- Zimbabwe Gold, the official currency of Zimbabwe (abbreviated as ZiG, ISO Code: ZWG)

== See also ==
- Zigzag (disambiguation)
- Sieg (disambiguation) (pronounced as "Zig")
