= Coleman Glacier =

Coleman Glacier may mean:

- Coleman Glacier (Antarctica), on Mount Andrus
- Coleman Glacier (Washington), on Mount Baker

== See also ==
- Coalman Glacier, on Mount Hood
