= Zag =

Zag or ZAG may refer to:

== Places ==
- Zag, Kentucky, US
- Zag, Mongolia, a district
- Zag, Morocco, a town
- Zagreb Airport, Croatia IATA airport code

== People ==
- Zag de Sujurmenza, 13th-century Spanish astronomer
- Zag, of English band Zag and the Coloured Beads

== Other uses ==
- AZGP1 (Zinc-alpha-2-glycoprotein)
- Zaghawa language, ISO 639-3 code
- Zag numbers, a type of alternating permutation
- Zag Industries, acquired by Stanley Black & Decker in 1990
- Zags or Gonzaga Bulldogs, college sports teams
- TrueCar, Inc., formerly Zag.com
- ZAGS, civil registration offices in Russia

== See also ==
- Zig and Zag (disambiguation)
- Zigzag (disambiguation)
