= GZZ =

GZZ, Gzz, or GŽZ may refer to:

- Gzz, graphical version of ZigZag data model
- GŽZ, abbreviation for Women's Voice of Slovenia in Slovenian, a party in the 2004 Slovenian parliamentary election
- GZZ Records, publisher of songs by Sal Priadi
