= Gentlemen's Race =

Western United States road ride

A Gentlemen's Race is a type of unsanctioned, unmarshalled bicycle race. The first such named race occurred in the Pacific Northwest region of the United States in 2008.

Taking cues from the running relay race Hood-to-Coast, where teams of 12 runners work together to race 187 miles (301 km) from Mount Hood to the Pacific Ocean, the Gentlemen's Race was first run around the northern base of Mt. Hood back to Portland with two checkpoints along the way to ensure fair play and safety.

Using a ranking and handicap system, teams of six riders depart with those estimated to be slowest first and the fastest departing last. Part team time trial, part alleycat races, part cannonball run, the teams must work and stay together the entire race.
