= St. John the Evangelist Roman Catholic Church (Zigzag, Oregon) =

Historic church in Oregon, United States

- U.S. National Register of Historic Places
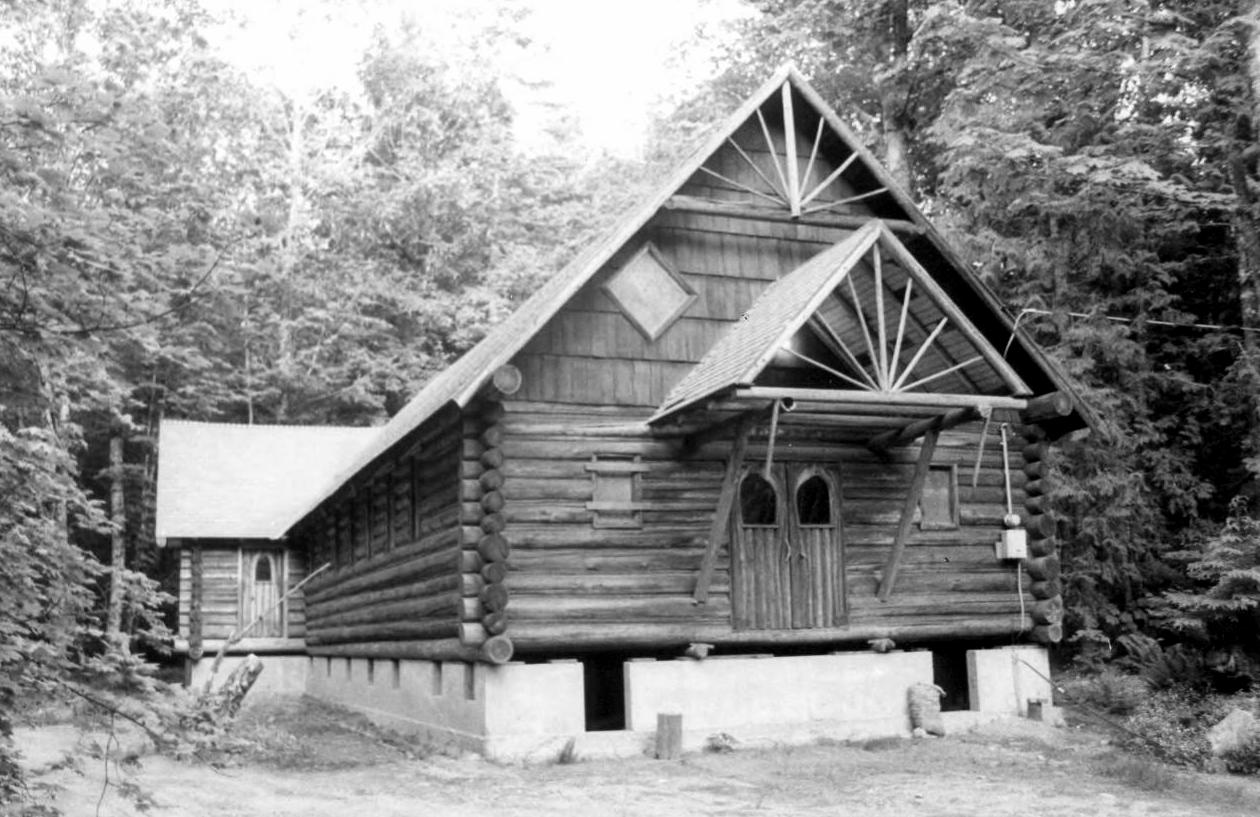
- Church photographed in 1978 after being relocated from the Zigzag site

- Location within Oregon Location within the United States
- Nearest city: Zizag, Oregon
- Coordinates: 45°21′8″N 121°57′19″W
- Area: 2.5 acres (1.0 ha)
- Built: 1937
- Architect: John Steiner
- Architectural style: Rustic
- NRHP reference No.: 79002045
- Added to NRHP: December 21, 1979

St. John the Evangelist Roman Catholic Church, also known as the Church of St. John in the Woods, is a historic church building located off Barlow Trail Road near Welches, Oregon, and originally located on Highway 26 in Welches, Oregon. It was built as a mission church and chapel of ease of the parish of St. Aloysius in Estacada. It became a mission of the parish of St. Michael the Archangel in Sandy, Oregon in 1952.

The historic church was built in 1937 in an Oregon Rustic style and officially dedicated on September 6. After the widening of U.S. Route 26 in 1971, the church had to be moved from the property, after which an updated church building was erected. Stained glass windows and log pews from the 1937 building were removed and installed in the updated church, which opened in 1972.

The log-cabin church building was added to the National Register of Historic Places in 1979.

== History ==
The St. John the Evangelist Church was originally built in 1926 in Zigzag and blessed on July 18, 1926. The church accommodated around 40 Catholic families and visitors in the Welches and Zigzag areas. The church had to be reconstructed in 1937 after the original building collapsed under snow.

A log-cabin-style new structure was erected in 1937 by Henry Steiner, with help from his sons, John, Fred and Al and was blessed by Archbishop Howard on September 6, 1937. The rustic architecture featured diamond windows and stained glass, paired hinged doors, irregular half-round windows, and king-pin trusses. The church building continued to function until 1971 when Highway 26 was widened to four lanes, which impinged on approximately 16 square feet (1.5 m^{2}) of the property. Due to land use regulations, the church building was relocated and used for a local theatre group to put on plays.

After the removal of the log-cabin church building, construction on a new church began in 1972 just about one mile away at 24905 Woodsey Way, in Welches. The stained glass windows and log pews of the former church building were salvaged and installed in the new church. This third incarnation of the church was blessed by Archbishop Dwyer on June 9, 1972.

In 1976, the building was bought by Mike Gudge and moved, all in one piece, to a new address at 68835 E. Barlow Trail Rd., where it was restored. Today it is known as the 1937 Steiner Log Church. It no longer holds services, but is open as a tourist destination showcasing the history of Henry Steiner and his family. Learn more at the church's web site, www.SteinerChurch.com. On December 21, 1979, the log-cabin church building was added to the National Register of Historic Places.

== See also ==
- National Register of Historic Places listings in Clackamas County, Oregon
