= Samuel Augustus Mitchell =

American geographer

- Born: 1792; Bristol, Connecticut
- Died: December 20, 1868 (aged c. 76); Philadelphia
- Occupation: Geographer

Samuel Augustus Mitchell (1790, Bristol, Connecticut – December 20, 1868, Philadelphia) was an American geographer.

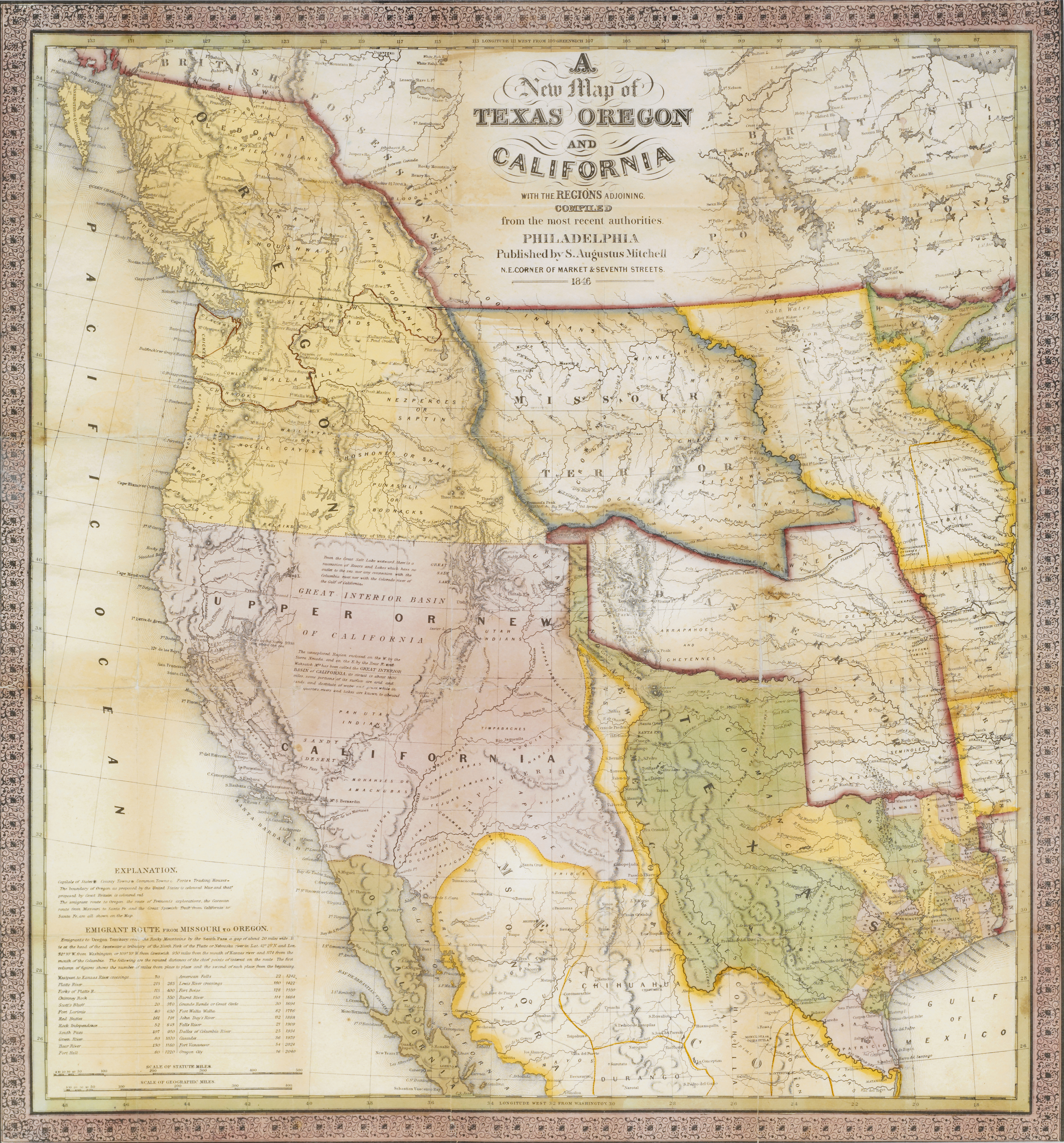
Mitchell's 1846 map of Texas, Oregon, and California

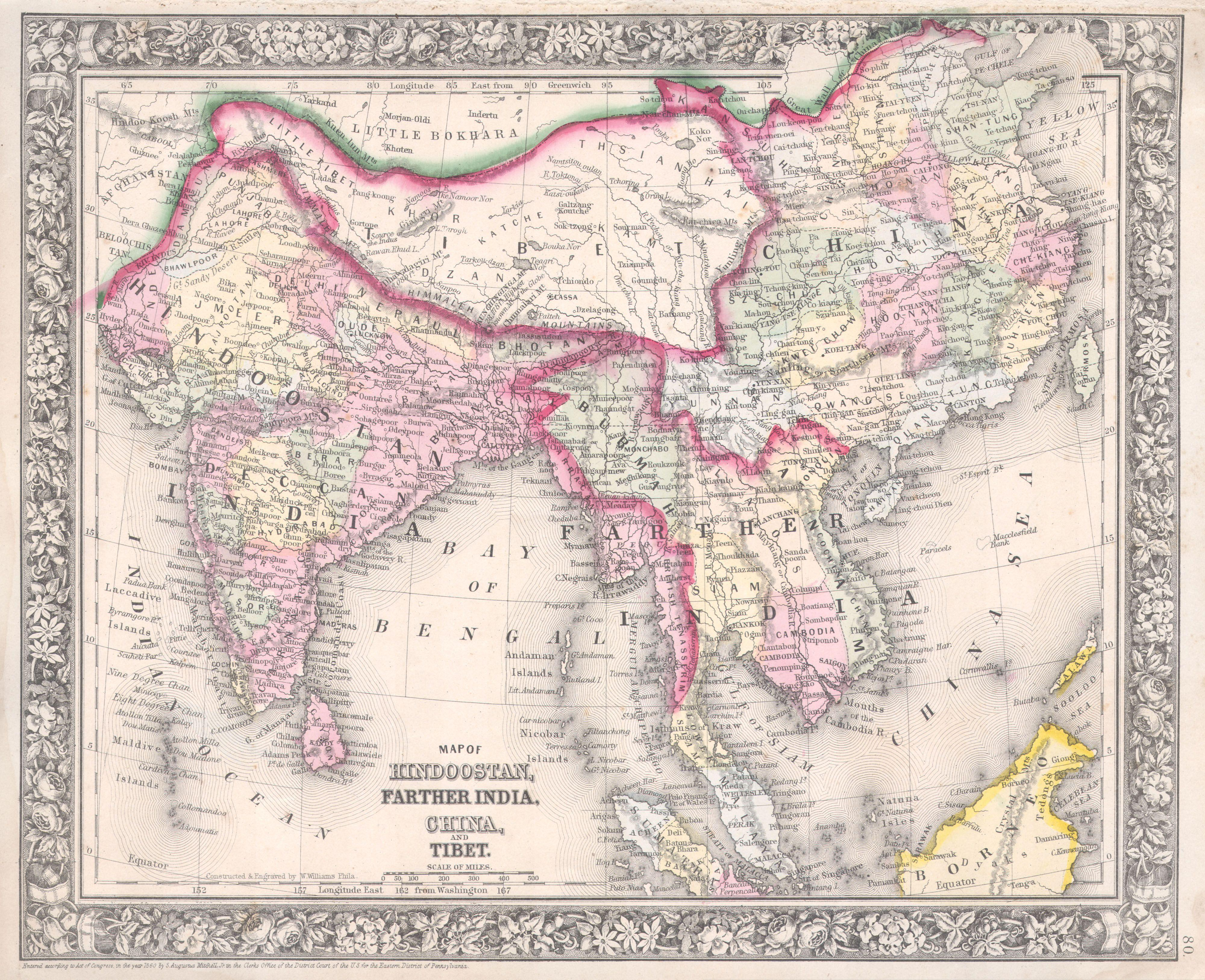
Mitchell's 1864 map of India, Tibet, China and Southeast Asia

He was born in Connecticut. Mitchell worked as a teacher before turning to publishing geography textbooks and maps. He became involved in geography after teaching and realizing that there were so many poor quality geographical resources available to teachers. He moved to Philadelphia, Pennsylvania in either 1829 or 1830. He was in Philadelphia when he founded his company. His son, S. Augustus Mitchell, became owner in 1860. Their publications covered all genres of geography: maps, travel guides, textbooks, and more. Sales of his 24 works reached an annual volume of over 400,000 copies.

== Works ==
- Mitchell's School Atlas, 1845—1857
- General View of the World, Physical, Political, and Statistical, 1846
- Travellers' Guide through the United States, 1850
- A system of modern geography, physical, political, and descriptive : accompanied by a new atlas of forty-four copperplate maps and illustrated by two hundred engravings,1865
