= Zigzag River =

River in Oregon, United States

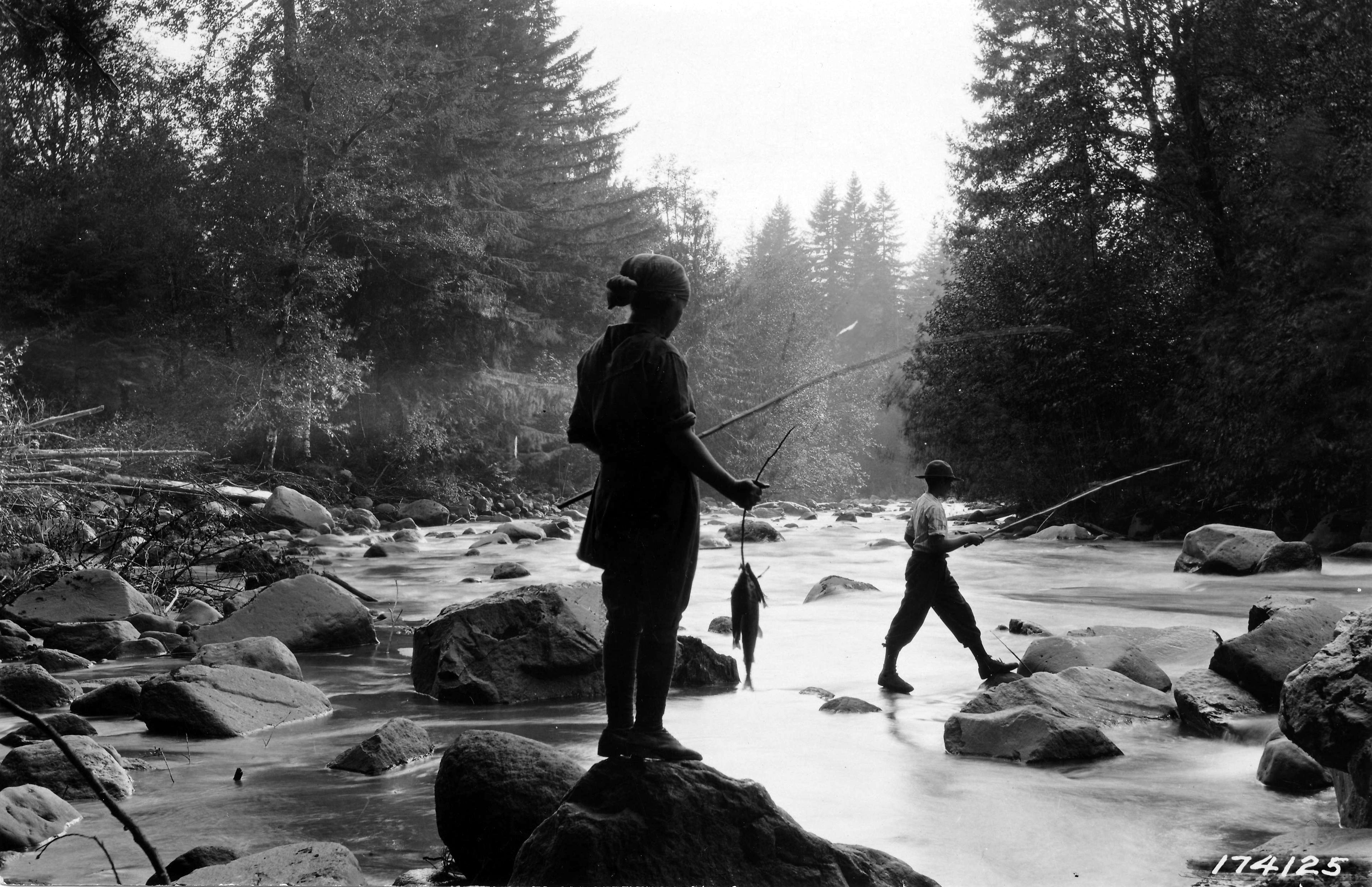
- Fishing on the Zigzag River

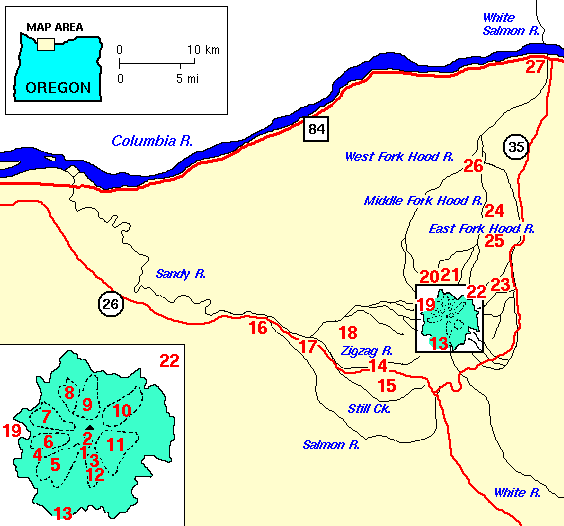
- Mount Hood and vicinity

- Location of the mouth of the Zigzag River in Oregon
- Etymology: From the description by Joel Palmer, an Oregon pioneer, of his descent in 1845 of a river canyon, later called Zigzag Canyon, that begins on Mount Hood.

Location
- Country: United States
- State: Oregon
- County: Clackamas County

Physical characteristics
- Source: Zigzag Glacier
  - location: Mount Hood
  - coordinates: 45°21′11″N 121°43′11″W
  - elevation: 7,113 ft (2,168 m)
- Mouth: Sandy River
  - location: near Zigzag, Oregon
  - coordinates: 45°20′54″N 121°56′44″W
  - elevation: 1,375 ft (419 m)
- Length: 12 mi (19 km)

National Wild and Scenic River
- Type: Wild
- Designated: March 30, 2009

The Zigzag River is a tributary, about 12 miles (19 km) long, of the Sandy River in the U.S. state of Oregon. The Zigzag and one of its major tributaries, the Little Zigzag River, drain the Zigzag Glacier on Mount Hood, a high volcanic peak in the Cascade Range. Their waters flow westward to meet the Sandy River near the community of Zigzag. The river's flow ranges from 200 to 1,000 cubic feet per second (5.7 to 28.3 m^{3}/s).

The dramatic topography of the Mississippi Head escarpment dominates the upper Zigzag River, where the 41-mile (66 km) Timberline Trail crosses the Zigzag River and the Paradise Park Loop Trail crosses a tributary. Avalanches have necessitated rebuilding of the Timberline Trail switchbacks on the southeast side of the river; the Pacific Crest Trail also follows this route.

Seventy-five-foot (23 m) Little Zigzag Falls on the Little Zigzag River is one of the three most popular off-road locations in the Zigzag basin, along with Mirror Lake on the Camp Creek tributary and the area just west of Timberline Lodge under three ski lifts which drains into the largest tributary, Still Creek.

Other than 11,239-foot (3426 m) Mount Hood, the highest point in the Zigzag watershed is 5,045 feet (1,538 m) Devils Peak which has a fire tower now used by overnight hikers. This area is under consideration in the 2007 Oregon Wilderness Area bill before congress for addition to the Salmon-Huckleberry Wilderness. The northern part of the watershed and the uppermost Zigzag River are in the Mount Hood Wilderness.

Falling 5,738 feet (1,749 m) between source and mouth, the stream's average loss of elevation is about 475 feet per mile (90.0 m/km). According to American Whitewater, the last 3.2 miles (5.1 km) of the Zigzag River, from Tollgate to the Sandy River, has been rated Class III (difficult) to IV (very difficult) on the International Scale of River Difficulty for whitewater boating. The average gradient in this stretch is 108 feet per mile (20.5 m/km).

Although the Zigzag River is closed to salmon and steelhead fishing, it offers catch-and-release fishing for coastal cutthroat trout.

== See also ==
- List of Oregon rivers
- Little Zigzag River
- Zigzag Mountain
- Zigzag, Oregon
- Zigzag Ranger Station
- Zigzag River
