= Zigzag, Oregon =

Unincorporated community in the state of Oregon, United States

Zigzag
- Unincorporated community
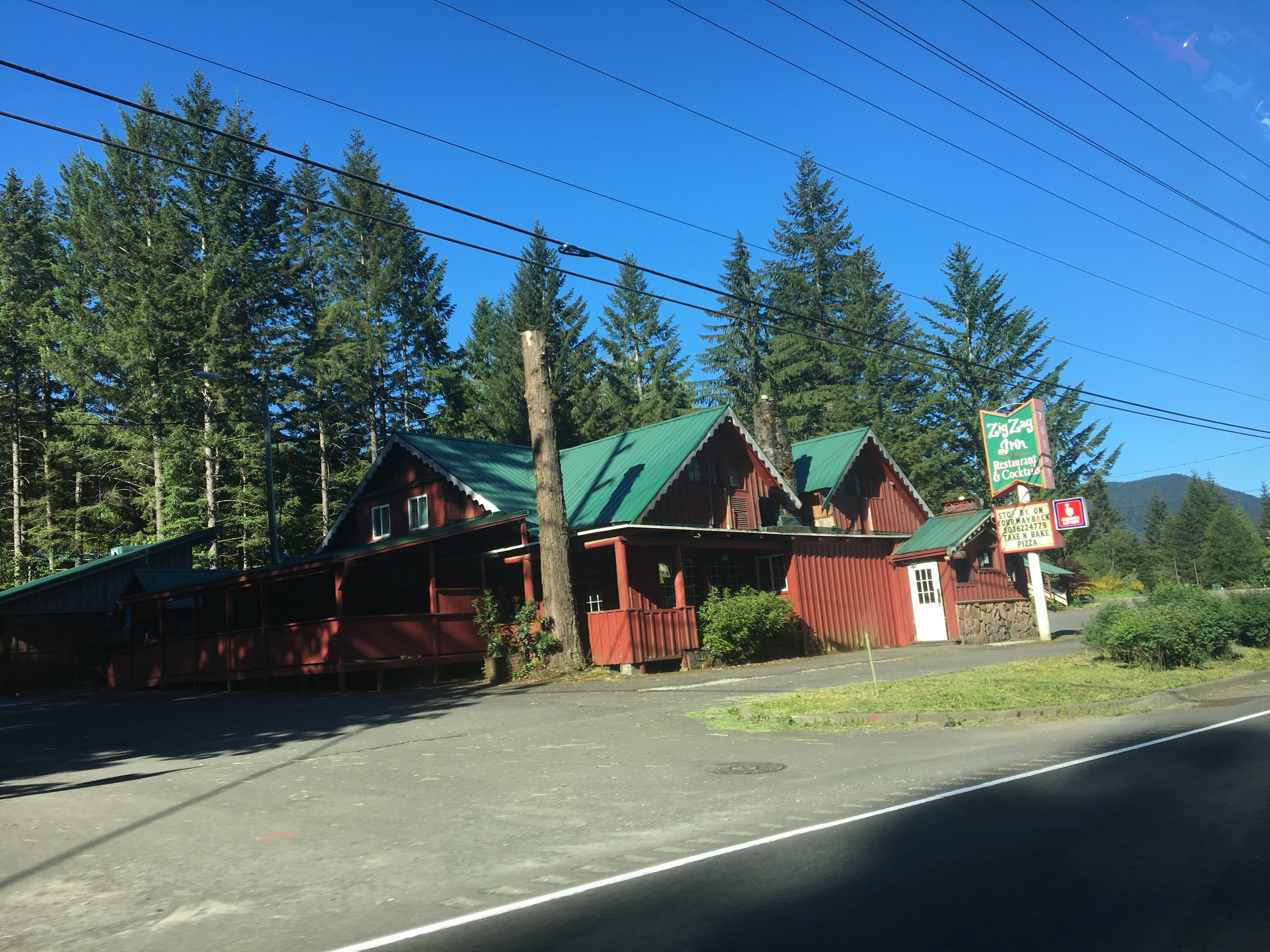
- The Zigzag Inn

- Location within the state of Oregon Zigzag (the United States)
- Coordinates: 45°20′38″N 121°56′35″W
- Country: United States
- State: Oregon
- County: Clackamas
- Elevation: 1,424 ft (434 m)
- Time zone: UTC-8 (Pacific (PST))
  - Summer (DST): UTC-7 (PDT)
- ZIP code: 97049
- Area codes: 503 and 971
- GNIS feature ID: 1152771

Zigzag is an unincorporated community in Clackamas County, Oregon, United States. It is located within the Mount Hood Corridor, between Rhododendron and Welches on U.S. Route 26. The community is part of a local type of government called a village as one of the communities making up the Villages at Mount Hood, which stretches from the border of Sandy to Government Camp.

The community is named after the nearby Zigzag River, a tributary of the Sandy River, which is in turn a tributary of the Columbia River. The place was also known as Zig Zag.

== History ==
Pioneer Joel Palmer crossed the deep ravine of Zigzag Canyon near the timberline on Mount Hood on October 11, 1845. He described the crossing in his journal:

The manner of descending is to turn directly to the right, go zigzag for about one hundred yards, then turn short round, and go zigzag until you come under the place where you started from; then to the right, and so on, until you reach the base.

The Zigzag River is no more crooked than adjoining streams, therefore the stream was most likely identified to fellow travelers on what was to become the Barlow Road by the manner of crossing and not for an especially irregular alignment.

Zigzag post office was established in 1917; it ran intermittently until 1974. For a time the Zigzag post office was located in present-day Rhododendron.

=== Historic structures ===
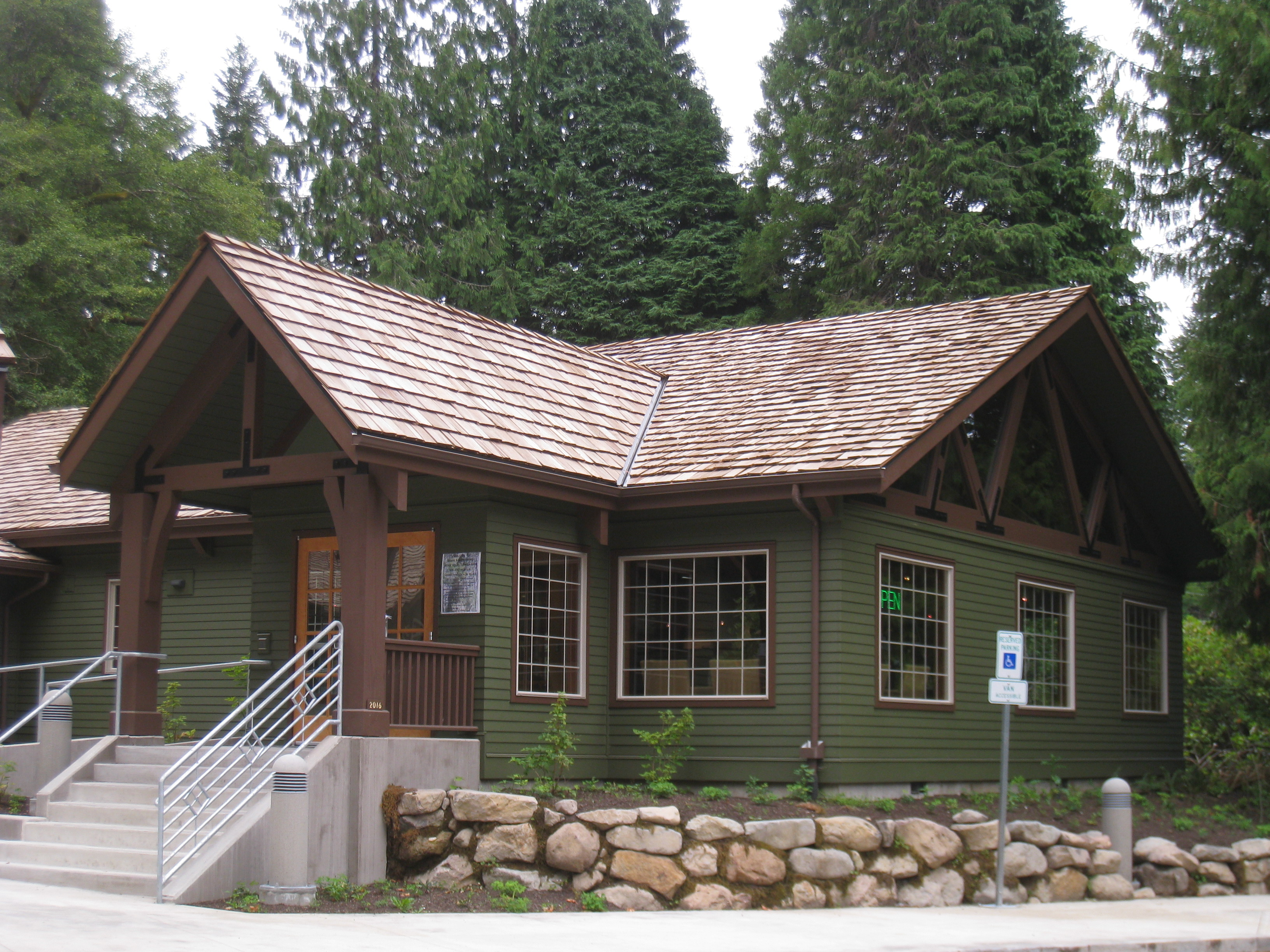
The Zigzag Ranger Station

The 1935 Zigzag Ranger Station is listed on the National Register of Historic Places (NRHP). St. John the Evangelist Roman Catholic Church, another NRHP property, was formerly in the Zigzag area. The ZigZag Inn—which, like the ranger station and church, is a rustic-style log structure—was built by William John "Bill" Lenz, son of the founder of Lenz in Hood River County. Lenz built many other notable structures in the area.

== See also ==
- Little Zigzag River
- Zigzag Mountain
- Zigzag Ranger Station
- Zigzag River
