= Zig and Zag =

Zig and Zag may refer to:

- Zig and Zag (Australian performers), Jack Perry and Doug McKenzie, a clown duo who appeared on Australian television from 1957 to 1969
- Zig and Zag (puppets), Irish puppet duo that made their television début on RTÉ's The Den in 1987
- Zig and Zag (TV series), animated TV series featuring the puppets

== See also ==
- Zigzag (disambiguation)
