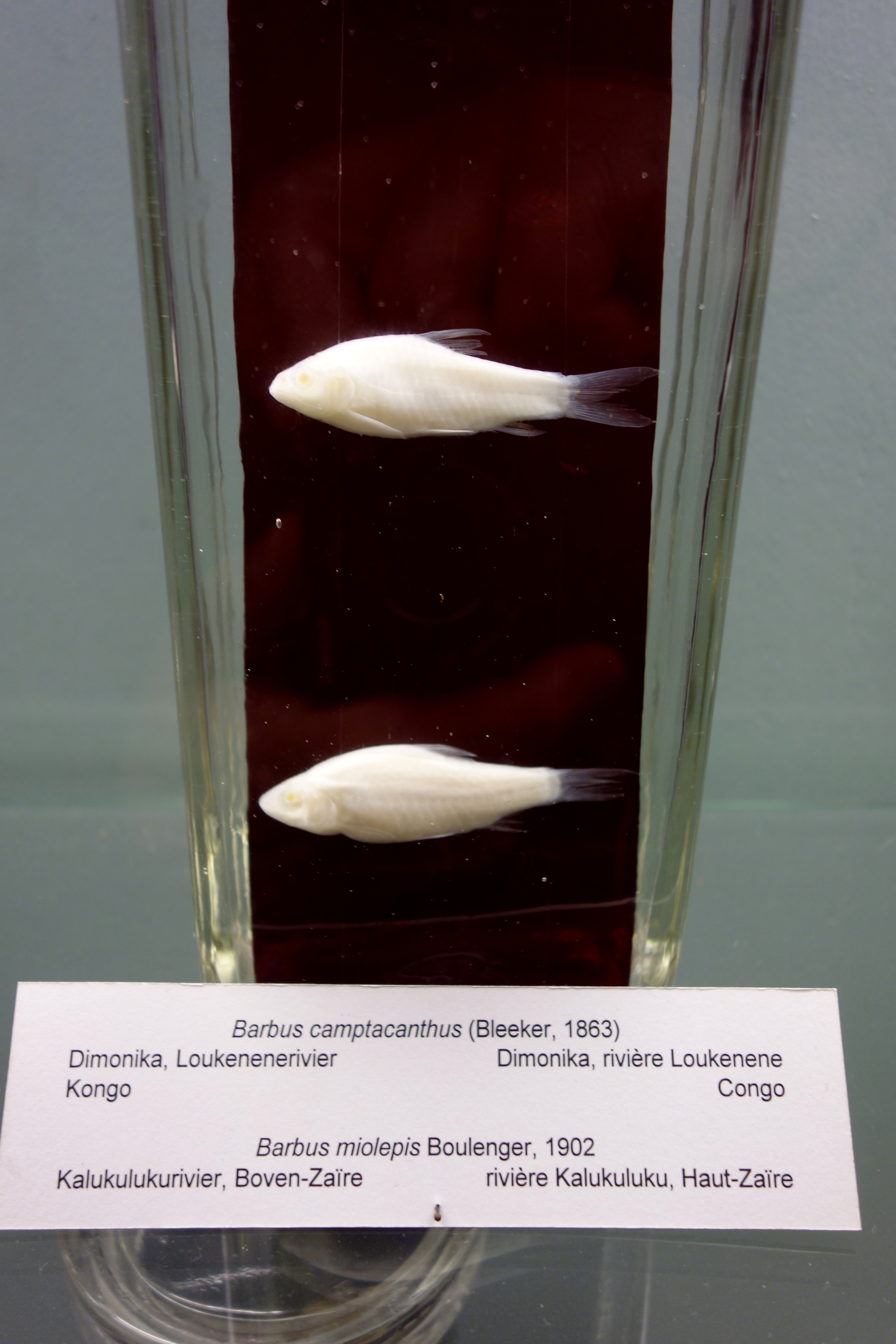
- Enteromius miolepis (bottom)

Conservation status
- Least Concern (IUCN 3.1)

Scientific classification
- Domain: Eukaryota
- Kingdom: Animalia
- Phylum: Chordata
- Class: Actinopterygii
- Order: Cypriniformes
- Family: Cyprinidae
- Subfamily: Smiliogastrinae
- Genus: Enteromius
- Species: E. miolepis

Binomial name
- Enteromius miolepis Boulenger, 1902

Synonyms
- Barbus miolepis Boulenger, 1902; Barbus decioi Fowler, 1958; Barbus nicholsi Vinciguerra, 1928; Barbus squamosissimus Steindachner, 1912; Barbus treadwelli Pellegrin, 1933

= Zigzag barb =

Species of fish

The zigzag barb (Enteromius miolepis) is a species of cyprinid fish in the genus Enteromius which occurs in the Congo Basin, Okavango River, Kafue River and the upper Zambezi.

== Footnotes ==
- Froese, Rainer; Pauly, Daniel (eds.). "Enteromius miolepis". FishBase.
