= Mitchell's School Atlas =

Series of textbooks written by Samuel Augustus Mitchell

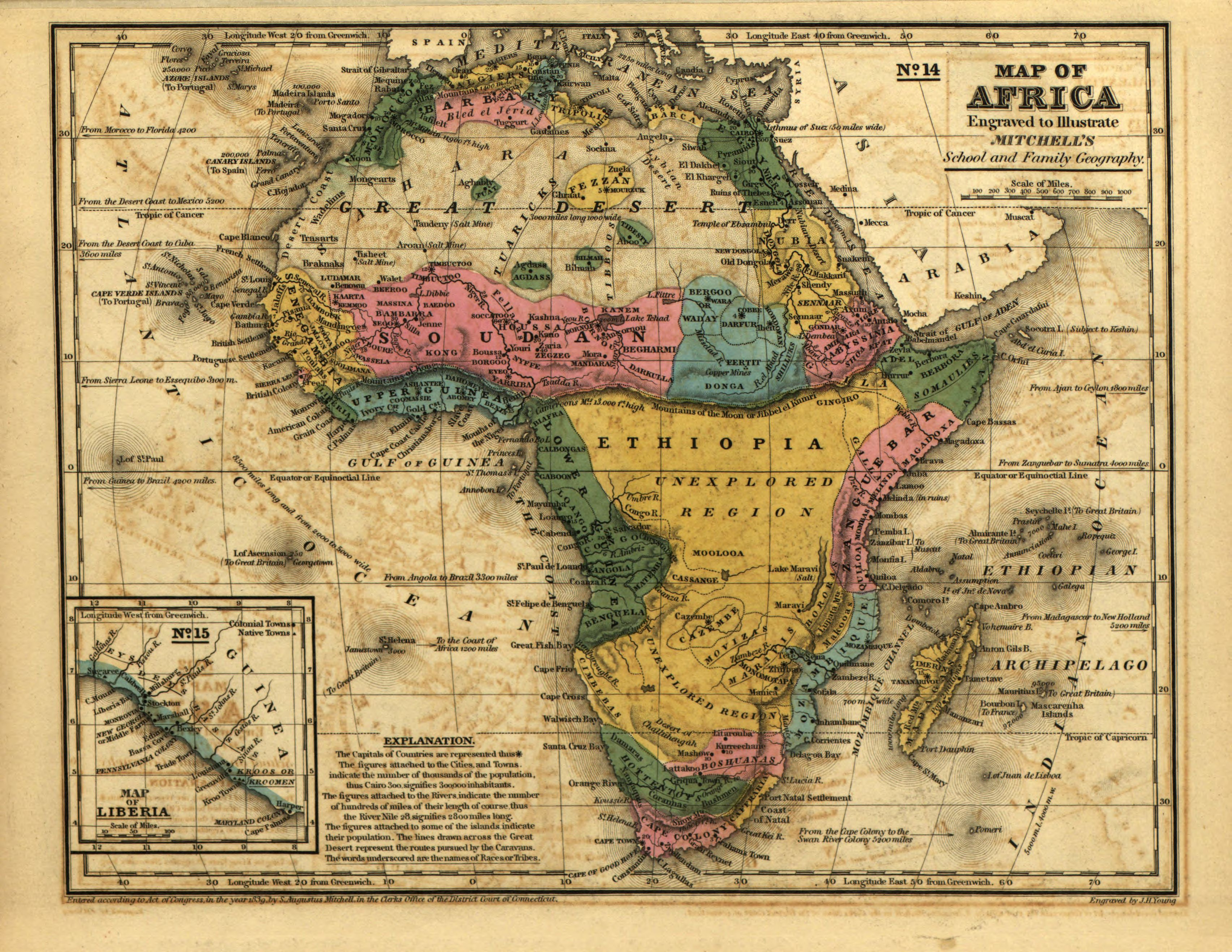
Africa, in 1839 edition

Mitchell's School Atlas is a series of textbooks written by Samuel Augustus Mitchell in the 19th century, and published by H. Cowperthwait & Company of Philadelphia, Pennsylvania.
