= Zigzag (surfing magazine) =

- Categories: Sport, Surf
- Frequency: Monthly
- Founder: 1976; 50 years ago
- Company: Jingo Media
- Country: South Africa
- Based in: Durban
- Language: English
- Website: www.zigzag.co.za

Zigzag was started in 1976 and inspired by a meeting with the publisher of a Hawaiian tabloid magazine named Backdoor. The headquarters is in Durban.

The original team was Paul Naude, Mike Larmont and Doug MacDonald. They set up shop in the rooftop of Larmont's surfboard factory, working nights while keeping their daytime jobs. Initially the magazine was tabloid-sized and released quarterly. In 1988 the magazine, struggling to make ends meet and with a full-time staff of one, was sold.

Craig Sims and Rob van Wieringen, the new owners, teamed up until 1991. Sims soldiered on and in March 2007 Touchline Media bought Atoll Media. At the end of 2007 Sims passed the custodianship of the fourth oldest surfing magazine in the world to the Publisher/Editor partnership of John McCarthy and Will Bendix. McCarthy left less than a year later to start a rival magazine.

Meanwhile, Zigzag continued under the guidance of the Editor, William Bendix, with a former Editor, Jeremy Saville, entering the fray in 2008 as the magazines brand manager.

Due to the global economic recession and Publishing House handovers, 2008 and 2009 was a roller coaster period for the Title. The magazine had to negotiating major staff retrenchments and lacked a dedicated publisher to lead the magazine. Despite the major re-structuring, in 2009 Zigzag reached a celebratory milestone by printing its 200th issue. Later that year Zigzag beat other popular national magazines (boasting more than double and triple the circulation of Zigzag) by taking out the 2009 'Best Special Interest Magazine' at the prestigious annual PICA awards. The PICA's are regarded as the Academy Awards for South Africa's magazine publishers and the 'Special Interest' category one of their premier awards.

Touchline Media was bought out by the largest media company in Africa, Media24 (Naspers), and Zigzag was moved around the company, first as a subsidiary of Famous Publishing (2010) and then from 2011 it was moved across to Media 24 Magazines until 2013. In October 2013 the magazine was acquired by Jingo Media, a content creation company that publishes South African creative culture magazine, Mahala, owned by Andy Davis, a regular Zigzag contributor. In so doing, Zigzag magazine moved back into the hands of an independent publisher and surfer.

In 2014, after 38 years of publishing, Zigzag has only had six Editors. It remains South Africa's most successful surfing publication.
