= Coalman Glacier =

Glacier on Mount Hood in Oregon, United States

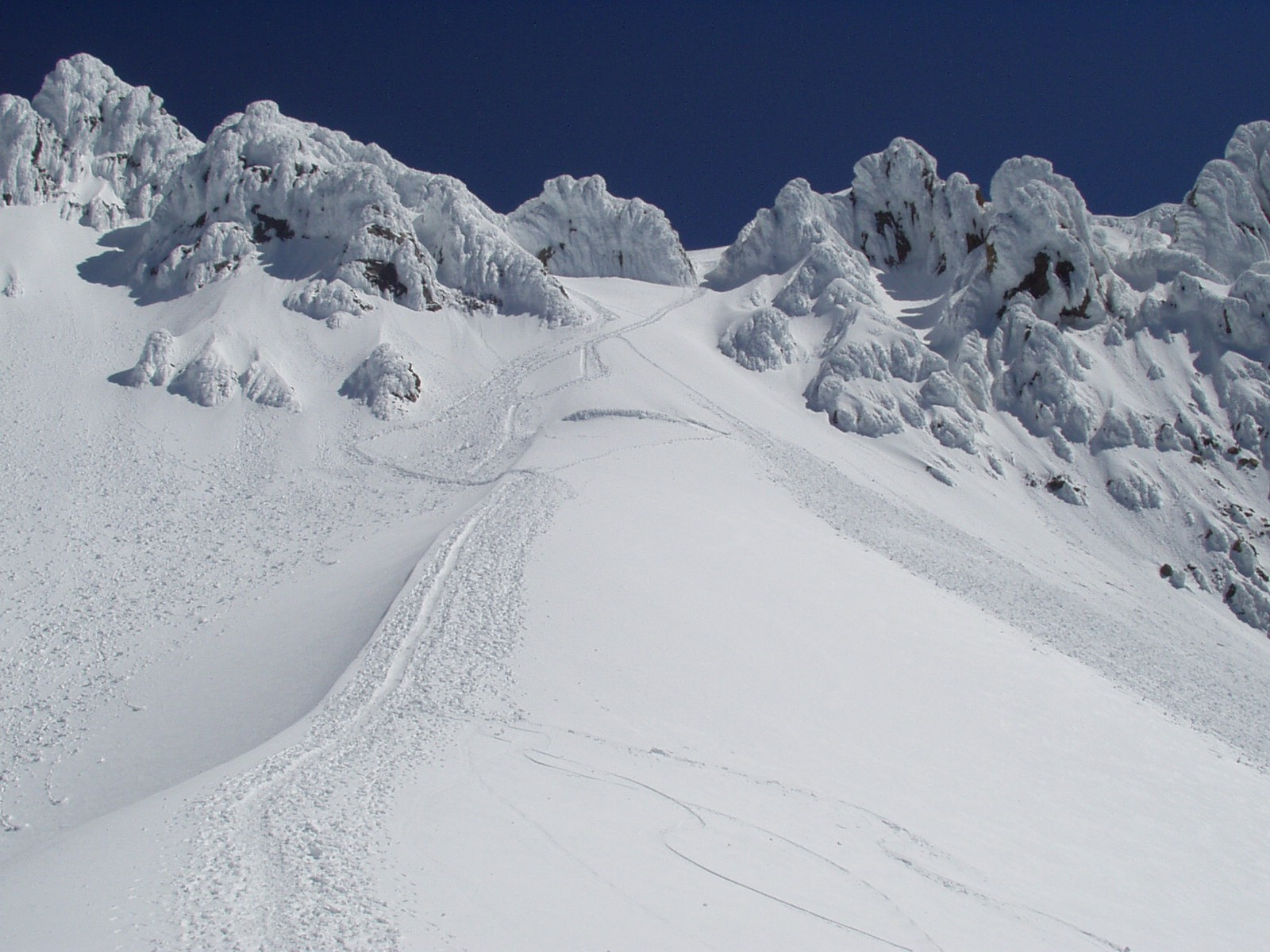
- Bergschrund on Coalman Glacier

- Location within Oregon
- Type: Mountain glacier
- Location: Clackamas / Hood River counties, Oregon, U.S.
- Coordinates: 45°22′19″N 121°41′54″W
- Area: 20 acres (8.1 ha)
- Terminus: Talus
- Status: Retreating

The Coalman Glacier (also Coleman Glacier) is a glacier located on the upper slopes of Mount Hood in the U.S. state of Oregon. It is the mountain's highest glacier ranging from about 11,200 to 10,500 ft (3,400 to 3,200 m), located within the crater rim, southwest of the peak. It was named for Elija Coalman (variously spelled Elijah Coleman), an early mountain guide who climbed Mount Hood 586 times.

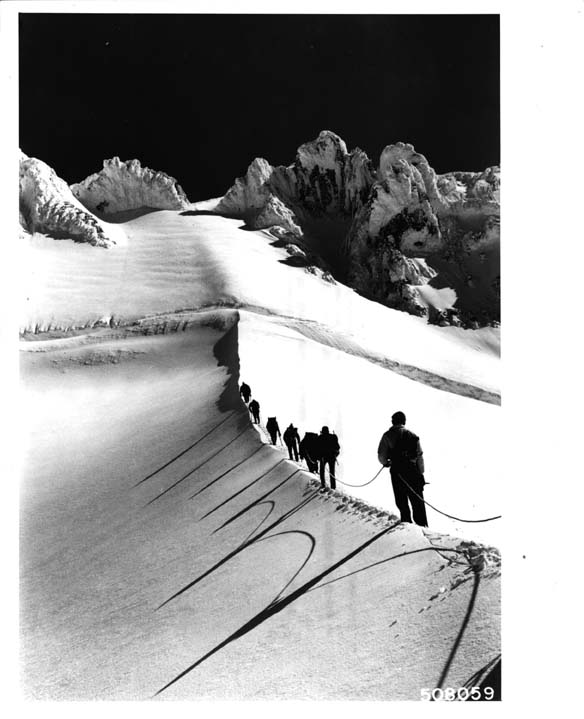
A group of climbers from The Mazamas ascend Mount Hood's Hogsback summer 1963

Coalman Glacier is the second most frequently visited glacier on the mountain because it is part of the popular South Climbing route from Timberline Lodge. It lies entirely within Mount Hood Wilderness. The most well known feature of Coalman is the Hogsback: a snow ridge running southwest to northeast from Crater Rock toward the summit ridge. The Bergschrund is another widely known feature where the glacier pulls away from the stagnant ice leaving a large crevasse. In 2007, it had become large enough to cause most climbers to use another route.

The glacier is a remnant of the massive glaciers that formed during the last ice age. It is historically known to change configuration dramatically, at times a gradual, smooth surface to Hot Rocks; at other times the same place has a 40 ft (12 m) ice cliff.

The glacier flows southwest, and is bounded on the north and east by the summit, on the northwest by the rocky crater wall known as Castle Crags (also Hawkins Cliffs), on the west by Hot Rocks, and on southeast by the back side of Steel Cliff.

== Climate ==
Hawkins Ridge lies on the upper western edge of Coalman Glacier. There is no weather station, but this climate table contains interpolated data.

Climate data for Hawkins Ridge 45.3703 N, 121.7039 W, Elevation: 9,646 ft (2,940 m) (1991–2020 normals)
Month	Jan	Feb	Mar	Apr	May	Jun	Jul	Aug	Sep	Oct	Nov	Dec	Year
Mean daily maximum °F (°C)	25.1 (−3.8)	24.4 (−4.2)	25.3 (−3.7)	28.9 (−1.7)	37.6 (3.1)	44.6 (7.0)	55.6 (13.1)	55.9 (13.3)	50.7 (10.4)	40.2 (4.6)	28.5 (−1.9)	23.9 (−4.5)	36.7 (2.6)
Daily mean °F (°C)	19.5 (−6.9)	17.5 (−8.1)	17.5 (−8.1)	20.0 (−6.7)	27.6 (−2.4)	33.8 (1.0)	43.3 (6.3)	43.6 (6.4)	39.2 (4.0)	30.8 (−0.7)	22.4 (−5.3)	18.5 (−7.5)	27.8 (−2.3)
Mean daily minimum °F (°C)	14.0 (−10.0)	10.6 (−11.9)	9.7 (−12.4)	11.2 (−11.6)	17.6 (−8.0)	23.1 (−4.9)	31.0 (−0.6)	31.4 (−0.3)	27.6 (−2.4)	21.4 (−5.9)	16.4 (−8.7)	13.1 (−10.5)	18.9 (−7.3)
Average precipitation inches (mm)	16.62 (422)	12.61 (320)	13.52 (343)	10.52 (267)	7.17 (182)	5.49 (139)	1.30 (33)	1.80 (46)	4.39 (112)	10.29 (261)	16.10 (409)	18.10 (460)	117.91 (2,994)
Source: PRISM Climate Group

== See also ==
- List of glaciers in the United States
