= Isbell's zigzag theorem =

Theorem of dominion in abstract algebra

Isbell's zigzag theorem, a theorem of abstract algebra characterizing the notion of a dominion, was introduced by American mathematician John R. Isbell in 1966. Dominion is a concept in semigroup theory, within the study of the properties of epimorphisms. For example, let U be a subsemigroup of S containing U, the inclusion map $U \hookrightarrow S$ is an epimorphism if and only if $\rm{Dom}_S (U) = S$, furthermore, a map $\alpha \colon S \to T$ is an epimorphism if and only if $\rm{Dom}_T (\rm{im} \; \alpha) = T$. The categories of rings and semigroups are examples of categories with non-surjective epimorphism, and the Zig-zag theorem gives necessary and sufficient conditions for determining whether or not a given morphism is epi. Proofs of this theorem are topological in nature, beginning with Isbell (1966) for semigroups, and continuing by Philip (1974), completing Isbell's original proof. The pure algebraic proofs were given by Howie (1976) and Storrer (1976). (Note: These pure algebraic proofs were based on the tensor product characterization of the dominant elements for monoid by Stenström (1971).)

== Statement ==
=== Zig-zag ===
The dashed line is the spine of the zig-zag.

Zig-zag: (Note: See Hoffman or Mitchell for commutative diagram.) If U is a submonoid of a monoid (or a subsemigroup of a semigroup) S, then a system of equalities;

$$\begin{align}
d &= x_1 u_1, &u_1 &= v_1 y_1 \\
x_{i - 1} v_{i - 1} &= x_i u_i, &u_i y_{i - 1} &= v_i y_i \; (i = 2, \dots, m) \\
x_{m} v_{m} &= u_{m+1}, &u_{m + 1} y_{m} &= d
\end{align}$$

in which $u_1, \dots , u_{m + 1}, v_1, \dots , v_{m} \in U$ and $x_1, \dots , x_{m}, y_1, \dots , y_{m} \in S$, is called a zig-zag of length m in S over U with value d. By the spine of the zig-zag we mean the ordered (2m + 1)-tuple $(u_1,v_1,u_2,v_2,\dots,u_{m},v_{m}, u_{m+1})$.

=== Dominion ===
Dominion: Let U be a submonoid of a monoid (or a subsemigroup of a semigroup) S. The dominion $\rm{Dom}_S (U)$ is the set of all elements $s \in S$ such that, for all homomorphisms $f, g : S \to T$ coinciding on U, $f(s) = g(s)$.

We call a subsemigroup U of a semigroup S closed if $\rm{Dom}_S (U) = U$, and dense if $\rm{Dom}_S (U) = S$.

=== Isbell's zigzag theorem ===
Isbell's zigzag theorem:

If U is a submonoid of a monoid S then $d \in \rm{Dom}_S (U)$ if and only if either $d \in U$ or there exists a zig-zag in S over U with value d that is, there is a sequence of factorizations of d of the form

$d = x_1 u_1=x_1 v_1 y_1 = x_2 u_2 y_1 = x_2 v_2 y_2 = \cdots = x_{m} v_{m} y_{m} = u_{m+1} y_{m}$

This statement also holds for semigroups.

For monoids, this theorem can be written more concisely:

Let S be a monoid, let U be a submonoid of S, and let $d \in S$. Then $d \in \mathrm{Dom}_{S} (U)$ if and only if $d \otimes 1 = 1 \otimes d$ in the tensor product $S \otimes_{U} S$.

== Application ==
- Let U be a commutative subsemigroup of a semigroup S. Then $\rm{Dom}_S (U)$ is commutative.
- Every epimorphism $\alpha \colon S \to T$ from a finite commutative semigroup S to another semigroup T is surjective.
- Inverse semigroups are absolutely closed.
- Example of non-surjective epimorphism in the category of rings: The inclusion $i: (\mathbb{Z},\cdot)\hookrightarrow (\mathbb{Q},\cdot)$ is an epimorphism in the category of all rings and ring homomorphisms by proving that any pair of ring homomorphisms $\beta, \gamma: \mathbb{Q} \to R$ to any ring $R$ which agree on $\mathbb{Z}$ are fact equal.

A proof sketch for example of non-surjective epimorphism in the category of rings by using zig-zag

We show that: Let $\beta, \gamma$ to be ring homomorphisms, and $n,m \in \mathbb{Z}$, $n \neq 0$. When $\beta(m) = \gamma(m)$ for all $m \in \mathbb{Z}$, then $\beta\left(\frac{m}{n}\right) = \gamma\left(\frac{m}{n}\right)$ for all $\frac{m}{n} \in \mathbb{Q}$.

$$\begin{align}
\beta\left(\frac{m}{n}\right)
&=\beta\left(\frac{1}{n} \cdot m \right)
= \beta\left(\frac{1}{n}\right)\cdot \beta(m)\\
&= \beta\left(\frac{1}{n}\right)\cdot \gamma(m)
= \beta\left(\frac{1}{n}\right)\cdot \gamma \left(mn \cdot \frac{1}{n} \right)\\
&= \beta\left(\frac{1}{n}\right)\cdot \gamma(mn) \cdot \gamma\left(\frac{1}{n}\right)
= \beta\left(\frac{1}{n}\right) \cdot \beta(mn)\cdot \gamma\left(\frac{1}{n}\right)\\
&= \beta\left(\frac{1}{n} \cdot mn \right)\cdot \gamma \left(\frac{1}{n} \right)
= \beta(m )\cdot \gamma\left(\frac{1}{n}\right)
= \gamma(m) \cdot \gamma\left(\frac{1}{n}\right)\\
&= \gamma \left(m \cdot \frac{1}{n}\right)
= \gamma \left(\frac{m}{n}\right),
\end{align}$$

as required.

== See also ==
- Epimorphisms
