= Zigzag Pass =

Mountain pass in South Georgia

Zigzag Pass (54°12′S 36°59′W) is a pass through the west portion of Wilckens Peaks in South Georgia, leading from Kohl Plateau to the head of Esmark Glacier. Descriptively named by United Kingdom Antarctic Place-Names Committee (UK-APC) in 1982 from the zigzag folding of the rocks in the pass.
