= Mount Hood =

Stratovolcano in Oregon, United States

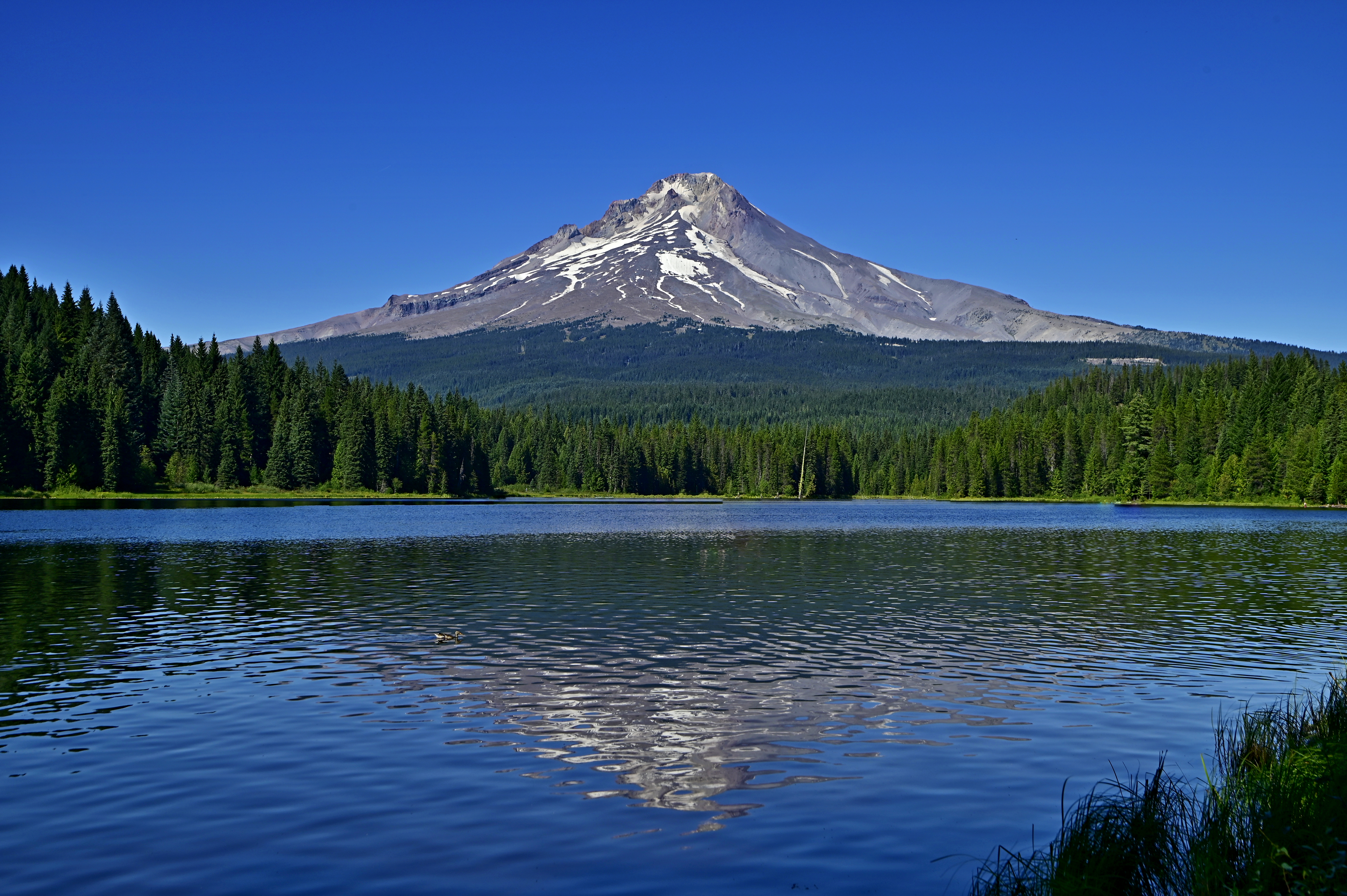
- Mount Hood reflected in Trillium Lake, 2024

Highest point
- Elevation: 11,249 ft (3,429 m) NAVD 88
- Prominence: 7,706 ft (2,349 m)
- Listing: North America prominent peak 49th; US most prominent peaks 28th; US state high point 13th; Oregon county high points
- Coordinates: 45°22′25″N 121°41′45″W

Geography
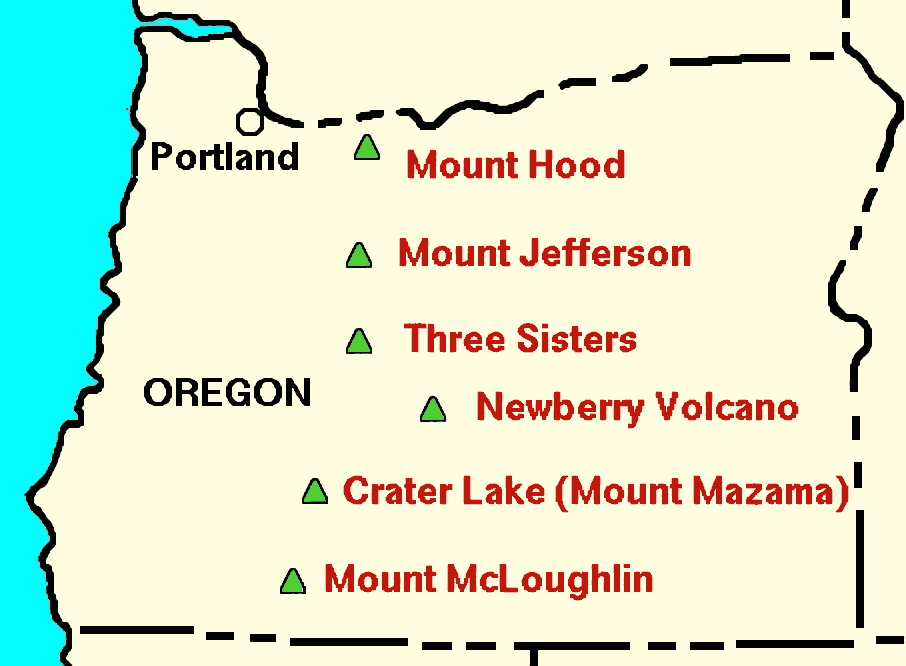
- Location relative to other Oregon volcanoes
- Location: Clackamas / Hood River counties, Oregon, U.S.
- Parent range: Cascade Range
- Topo map: USGS Mount Hood South

Geology
- Formed by: Subduction zone volcanism
- Rock age: More than 500,000 years
- Mountain type: Stratovolcano
- Rock type(s): Andesite, Basaltic andesite
- Volcanic arc: Cascade Volcanic Arc
- Last eruption: 21 September 1865 to January 1866

Climbing
- First ascent: July 11, 1857, by Henry Pittock, W. Lymen Chittenden, Wilbur Cornell, and the Rev. T. A. Wood
- Easiest route: Rock and glacier climb

Mount Hood is an active stratovolcano in the Cascade Range and is a member of the Cascade Volcanic Arc. It was formed by a subduction zone on the Pacific Coast and rests in the Pacific Northwest region of the United States. It is located about 50 miles (80 km) east-east-southeast of Portland, on the border between Clackamas and Hood River counties, and forms part of the Mount Hood National Forest. With a summit elevation of 11,249 feet (3,429 m), it is the highest mountain in the U.S. state of Oregon and is the fourth highest in the Cascade Range.

Ski areas on the mountain include Timberline Lodge ski area, which offers the only year-round lift-served skiing in North America, Mount Hood Meadows, Mount Hood Skibowl, Summit Ski Area, and Cooper Spur ski area. Much of the mountain outside the ski areas is part of the Mount Hood Wilderness. Mt. Hood attracts an estimated 10,000 climbers a year.

The peak is home to 12 named glaciers and snowfields. Mount Hood is considered the Oregon volcano most likely to erupt. The odds of an eruption in the next 30 years are estimated at between 3 and 7%, so the U.S. Geological Survey (USGS) characterizes it as "potentially active", but the mountain is informally considered dormant.

== Establishments ==
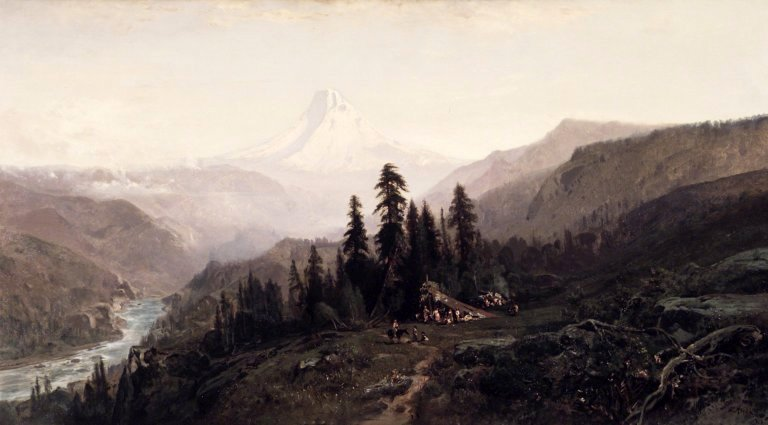
William Keith (American, 1838–1911). Mount Hood, Oregon, c. 1881–1883. Brooklyn Museum.

Timberline Lodge is a National Historic Landmark located on the southern flank of Mount Hood just below Palmer Glacier, with an elevation of about 6,000 feet (1,800 m).

The mountain has four ski areas: Timberline, Mount Hood Meadows, Ski Bowl, and Cooper Spur. They total over 4,600 acres (7.2 sq mi; 19 km^{2}) of skiable terrain; Timberline, with one lift having a base at nearly 6,940 feet (2,120 m), offers the only year-round lift-served skiing in North America.

There are a few remaining shelters on Mount Hood still in use today. Those include the Cooper Spur, Cairn Basin, and McNeil Point shelters as well as the Tilly Jane A-frame cabin. The summit was home to a fire lookout in the early 1900s; however, the lookout did not withstand the weather and no longer remains today.

Mount Hood is within the Mount Hood National Forest, which comprises 1,067,043 acres (1,667 sq mi; 4,318 km^{2}) of land, including four designated wilderness areas that total 314,078 acres (491 sq mi; 1,271 km^{2}), and more than 1,200 miles (1,900 km) of hiking trails.

The most northwestern pass around the mountain is called Lolo Pass. Native Americans crossed the pass while traveling between the Willamette Valley and Celilo Falls.

== Naming ==
=== Indigenous names ===
It has been difficult to establish place names for Mount Hood that are of indigenous etymology, or to reconstruct names that may have been used prior to European contact.

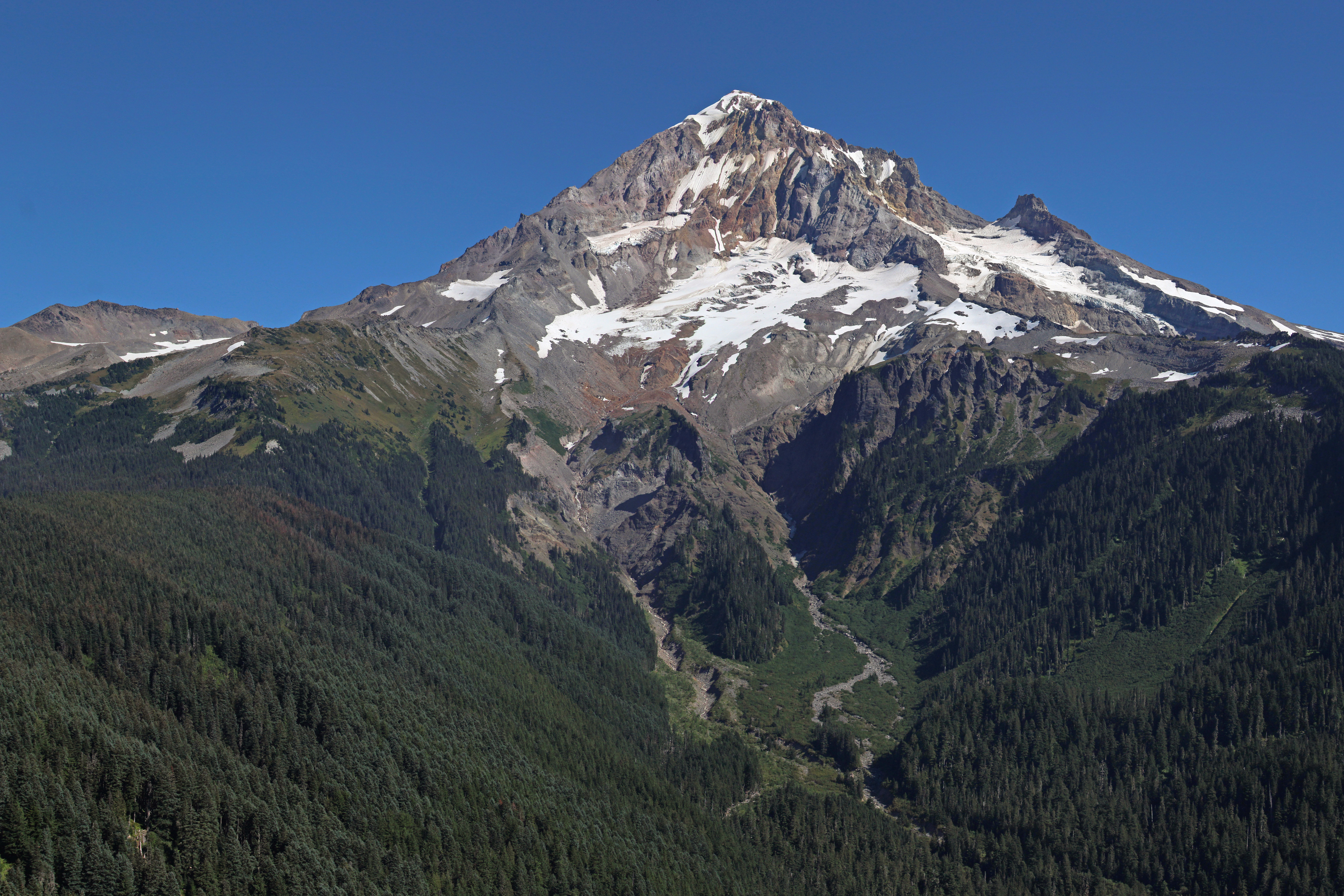
View of Mount Hood from the west

==== Wy'east ====
The name Wy'east has been associated with Mount Hood for more than a century, but no evidence suggests that it is a genuine name for the mountain in any indigenous language. The name was possibly inspired by an 1890 work of author Frederic Balch, although Balch does not use it himself. The name may have been popularized by his story being combined with a play around 1911 at Pacific College. It is also possible it was 'invented' by scholars in the 20th century or even a minister hearing it second-hand around the same time the play was happening.

In one version of Balch's story, the two sons of the Great Spirit Sahale fell in love with the beautiful maiden Loowit, who could not decide which to choose. The two braves, Wy'east and Pahto (unnamed in his novel, but appearing in a later adaptation), burned forests and villages in their battle over her. Sahale became enraged and smote the three lovers. Seeing what he had done, he erected three mountain peaks to mark where each fell. He made beautiful Mount St. Helens for Loowit, proud and erect Mount Hood for Wy'east, and the somber Mount Adams for the mourning Pahto.

There are other versions of the legend. In another telling, Wy'east (Hood) battles Pahto (Adams) for the fair La-wa-la-clough (St. Helens). Or again Wy'east, the chief of the Multnomah tribe, competed with the chief of the Klickitat tribe. Their great anger led to their transformation into volcanoes. Their battle is said to have destroyed the Bridge of the Gods and thus created the great Cascades Rapids of the Columbia River.

==== Other names ====
The mountain sits partly inside the reservation of the Confederated Tribes of Warm Springs, which comprises multiple languages including Sahaptin, Upper Chinook/Kiksht (Wasco) and Numu (Paiute). However, it has been difficult to determine names originating from these or other indigenous languages specifically referring to Mount Hood. Eugene Hunn suggests that the mountain may have lacked a specific name:

Learning a landscape is not simply a matter of naming all the rivers and mountains... The Native American perspective emphasizes by contrast places as focal points of activity, places where significant human-landscape interactions occur. Thus, while a few prominent peaks may be given Indian names, such as taxùma [təqʷuʔməʔ] for Mt. Rainier (in the Puget Salish language) or lawilayt-łà [lawílatɬa], literally "the smoker," for Mt. St. Helens (in Sahaptin), other prominent peaks, e.g. Mts. Adams and Hood, are known simply as pàtu, a general term for snow-capped summit.

=== Current name ===
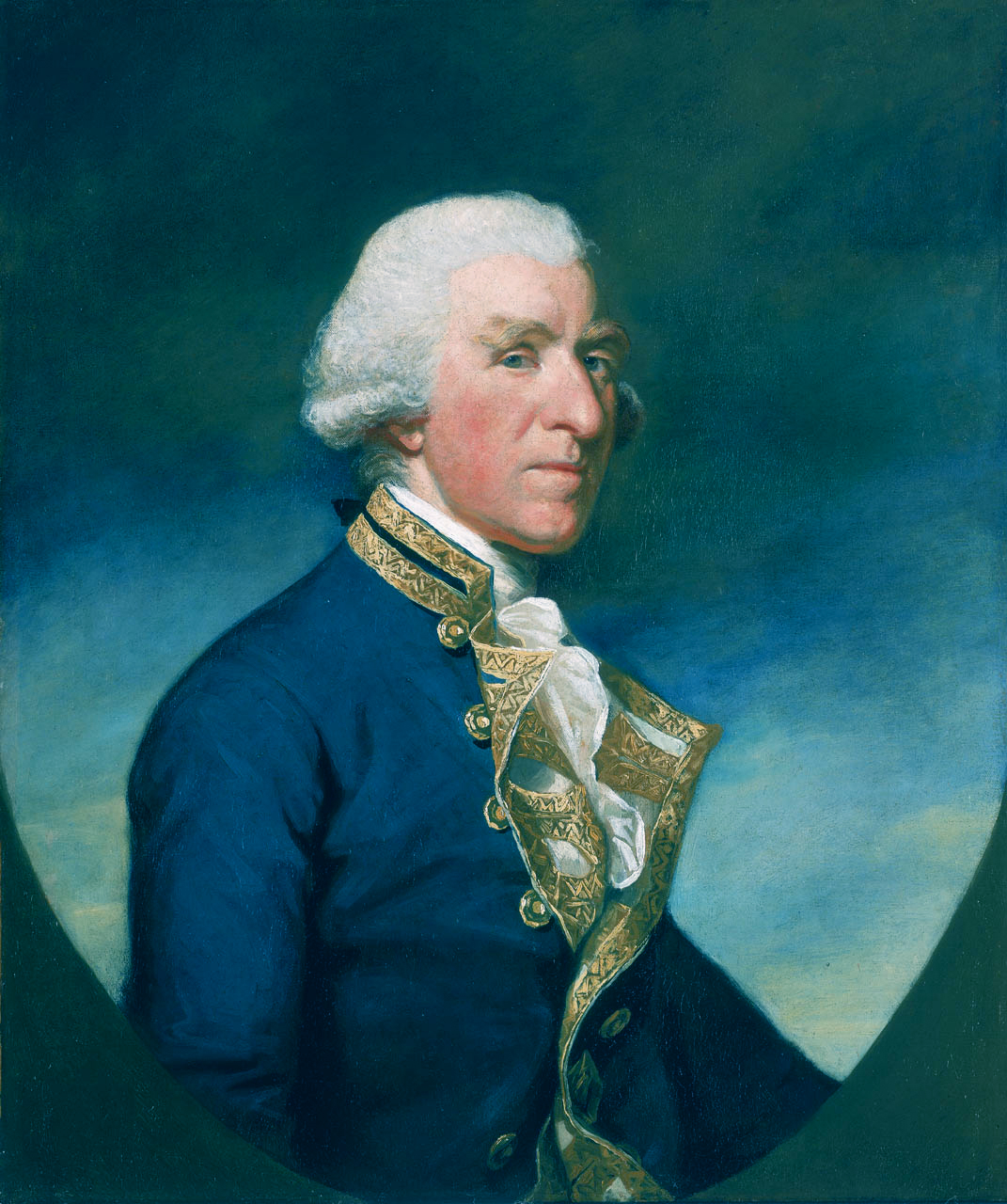
Admiral Hood, the mountain's namesake

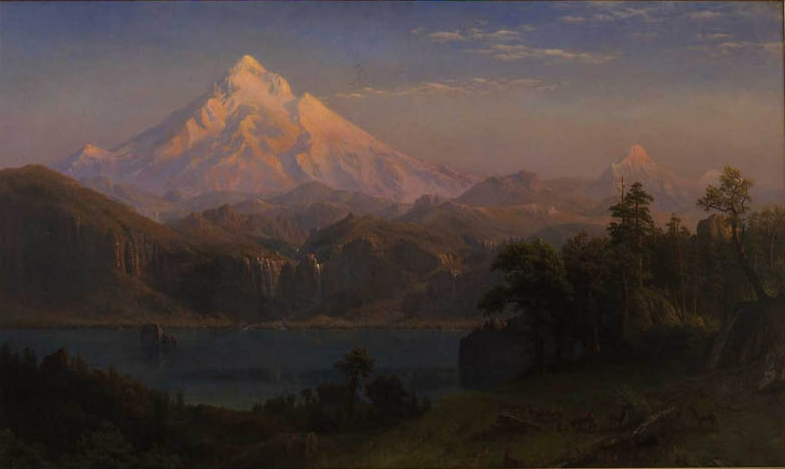
Albert Bierstadt, Mount Hood, 1869

The mountain was given its present name on October 29, 1792, by Lt. William Broughton, a member of Captain George Vancouver's exploration expedition. Lt. Broughton observed its peak while at Belle Vue Point of what is now called Sauvie Island during his travels up the Columbia River, writing, "A very high, snowy mountain now appeared rising beautifully conspicuous in the midst of an extensive tract of low or moderately elevated land [location of today's Vancouver, Washington] lying S 67 E., and seemed to announce a termination to the river." Lt. Broughton named the mountain after Samuel Hood, 1st Viscount Hood, a British admiral.

Lewis and Clark spotted the mountain on October 18, 1805. A few days later at what would become The Dalles, Clark wrote, "The pinnacle of the round topped mountain, which we saw a short distance below the banks of the river, is South 43-degrees West of us and about 37 mi (60 km). It is at this time topped with snow. We called this the Falls Mountain, or Timm Mountain." Timm was the native name for Celilo Falls. Clark later noted that it was also Vancouver's Mount Hood.

Two French explorers from the Hudson's Bay Company may have traveled into the Dog River area east of Mount Hood in 1818. They reported climbing to a glacier on "Montagne de Neige" (Mountain of Snow), probably Eliot Glacier.

=== Namesakes ===
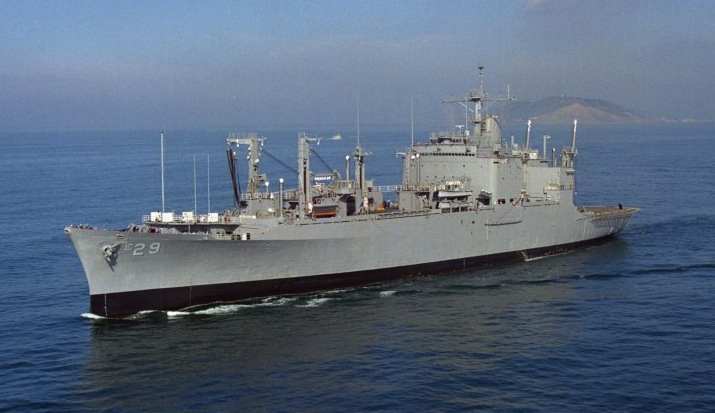
USS Mount Hood (AE-29)

There have been two United States Navy ammunition ships named for Mount Hood. USS Mount Hood (AE-11) was commissioned in July 1944 and was destroyed in November 1944 while at anchor in Manus Naval Base, Admiralty Islands. Her explosive cargo ignited, resulting in 45 confirmed dead, 327 missing and 371 injured. A second ammunition ship, AE-29, was commissioned in May 1971 and decommissioned in August 1999.

== Volcanic activity ==
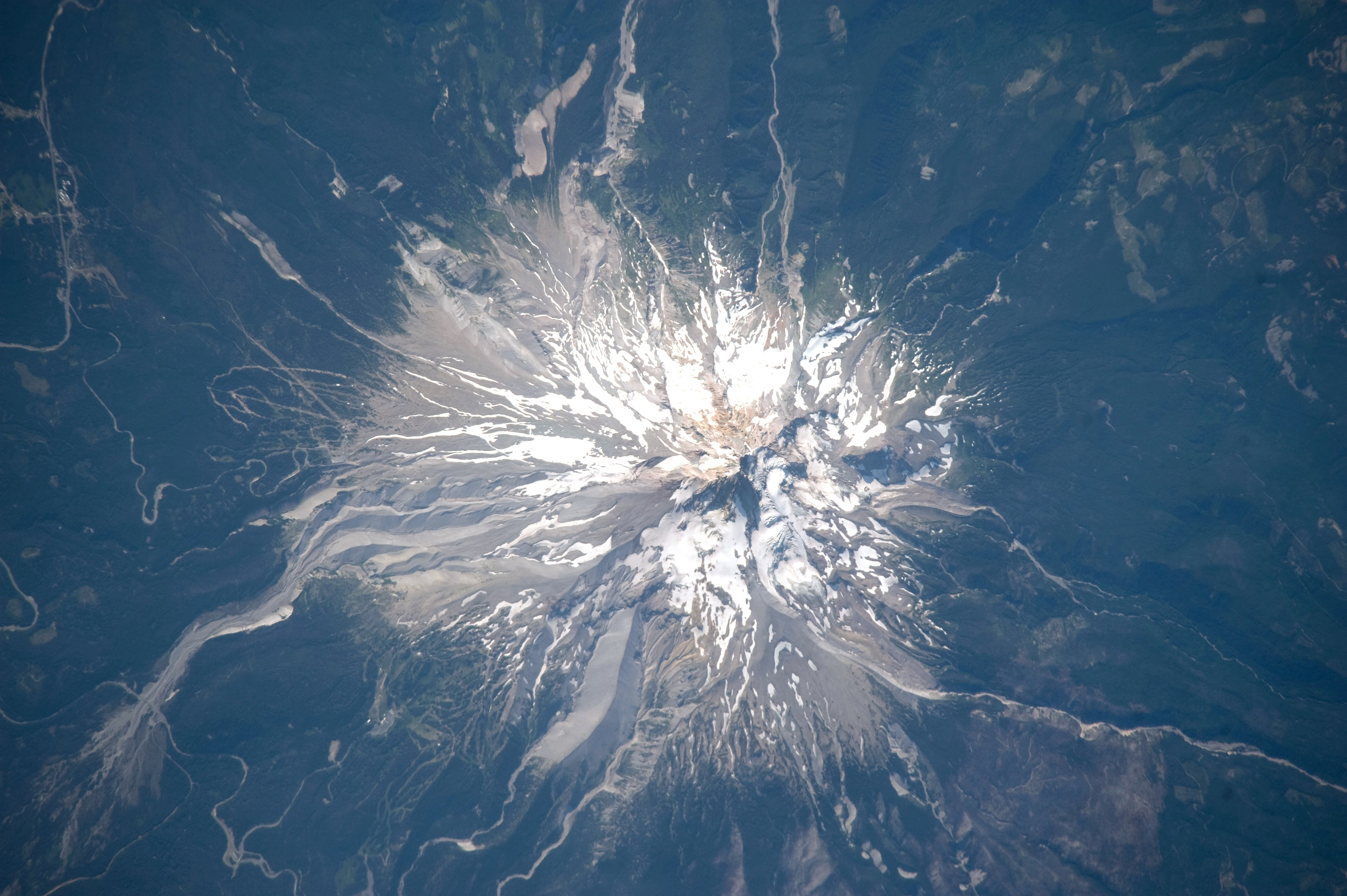
Satellite image of Mount Hood

The glacially eroded summit area consists of several andesitic or dacitic lava domes; Pleistocene collapses produced avalanches and lahars (rapidly moving mudflows) that traveled across the Columbia River to the north. The eroded volcano has had at least four major eruptive periods during the past 15,000 years.

The last three eruptions at Mount Hood occurred within the past 1,800 years from vents high on the southwest flank and produced deposits that were distributed primarily to the south and west along the Sandy and Zigzag rivers. The volcano has had a VEI of 2 at least three times before. The last eruptive period took place around 220 to 170 years ago, when dacitic lava domes, pyroclastic flows and mudflows were produced without major explosive eruptions. The prominent Crater Rock just below the summit is hypothesized to be the remains of one of these now-eroded domes. This period includes the last major eruption of 1781 to 1782 with a slightly more recent episode ending shortly before the arrival of the explorers Lewis and Clark in 1805. The latest minor eruptive event was thought to have occurred in August 1907, but has been discredited as "an observation of non-eruptive fumarolic activity."

The glaciers on the mountain's upper slopes may be a source of potentially dangerous lahars when the mountain next erupts. There are vents near the summit that are known for emitting gases such as carbon dioxide and sulfur dioxide. Prior to the 1980 eruption of Mount St. Helens, the only known fatality related to volcanic activity in the Cascades occurred in 1934, when a climber suffocated in oxygen-poor air while exploring ice caves melted by fumaroles in Coalman Glacier on Mount Hood.

Since 1950, there have been several earthquake swarms each year at Mount Hood, most notably in July 1980 and June 2002. Seismic activity is monitored by the USGS Cascades Volcano Observatory in Vancouver, Washington, which issues weekly updates (and daily updates if significant eruptive activity is occurring at a Cascades volcano).

The most recent evidence of volcanic activity at Mount Hood consists of fumaroles near Crater Rock and hot springs on the flanks of the volcano.

=== Monitoring controversy ===
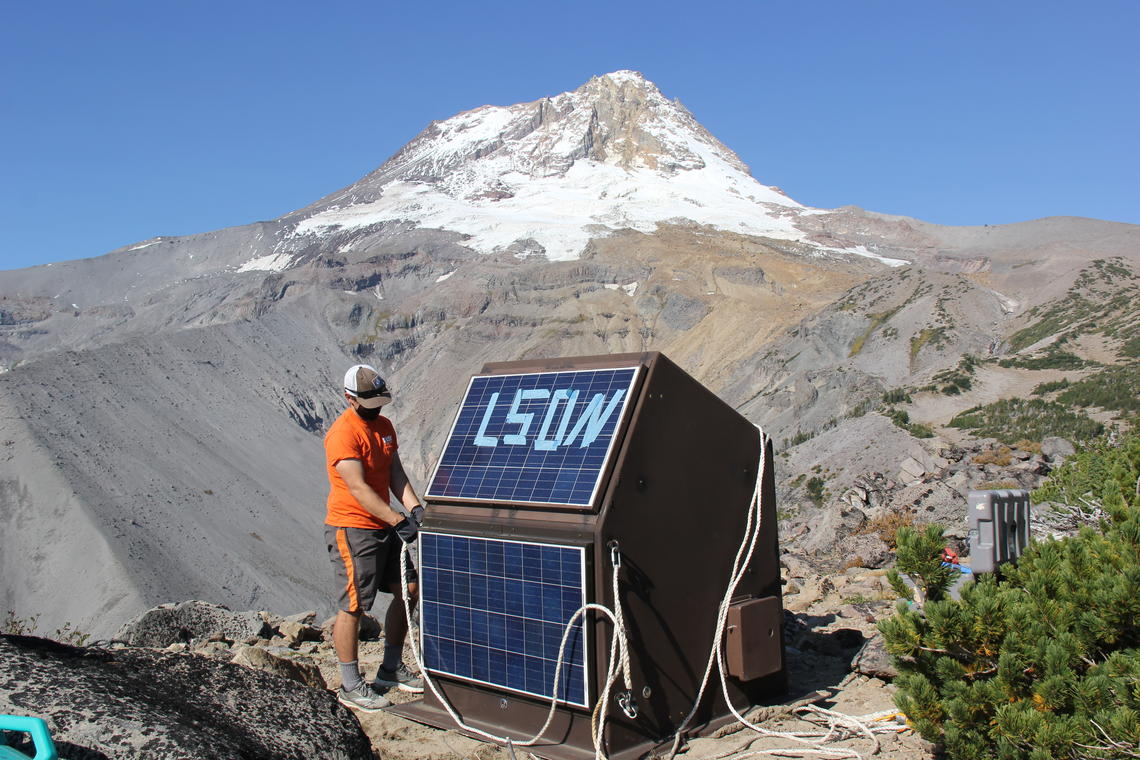
New seismic/GPS station (LSON) installed at Mount Hood

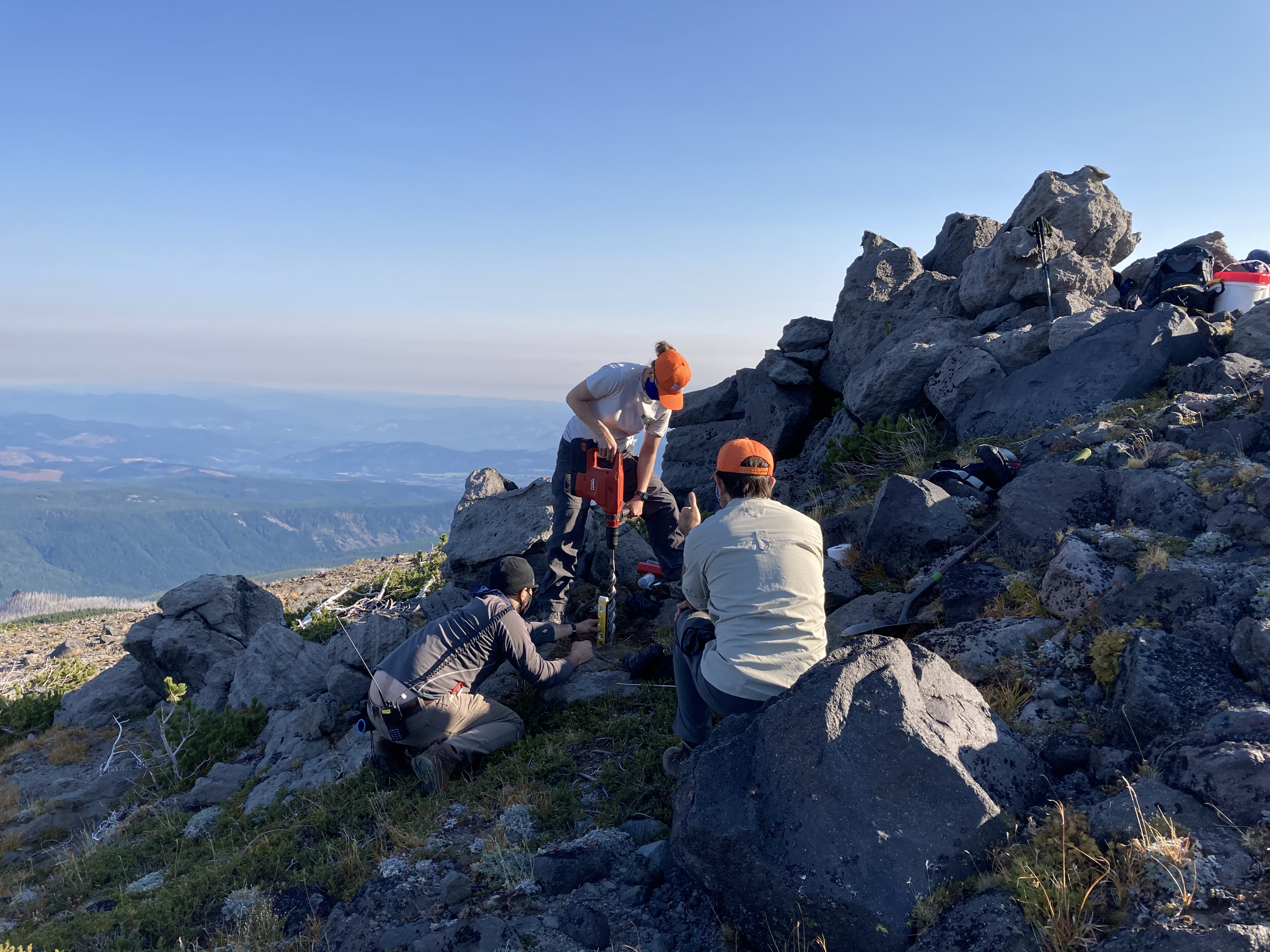
Installation of GPS mast at station BRSP on Mount Hood

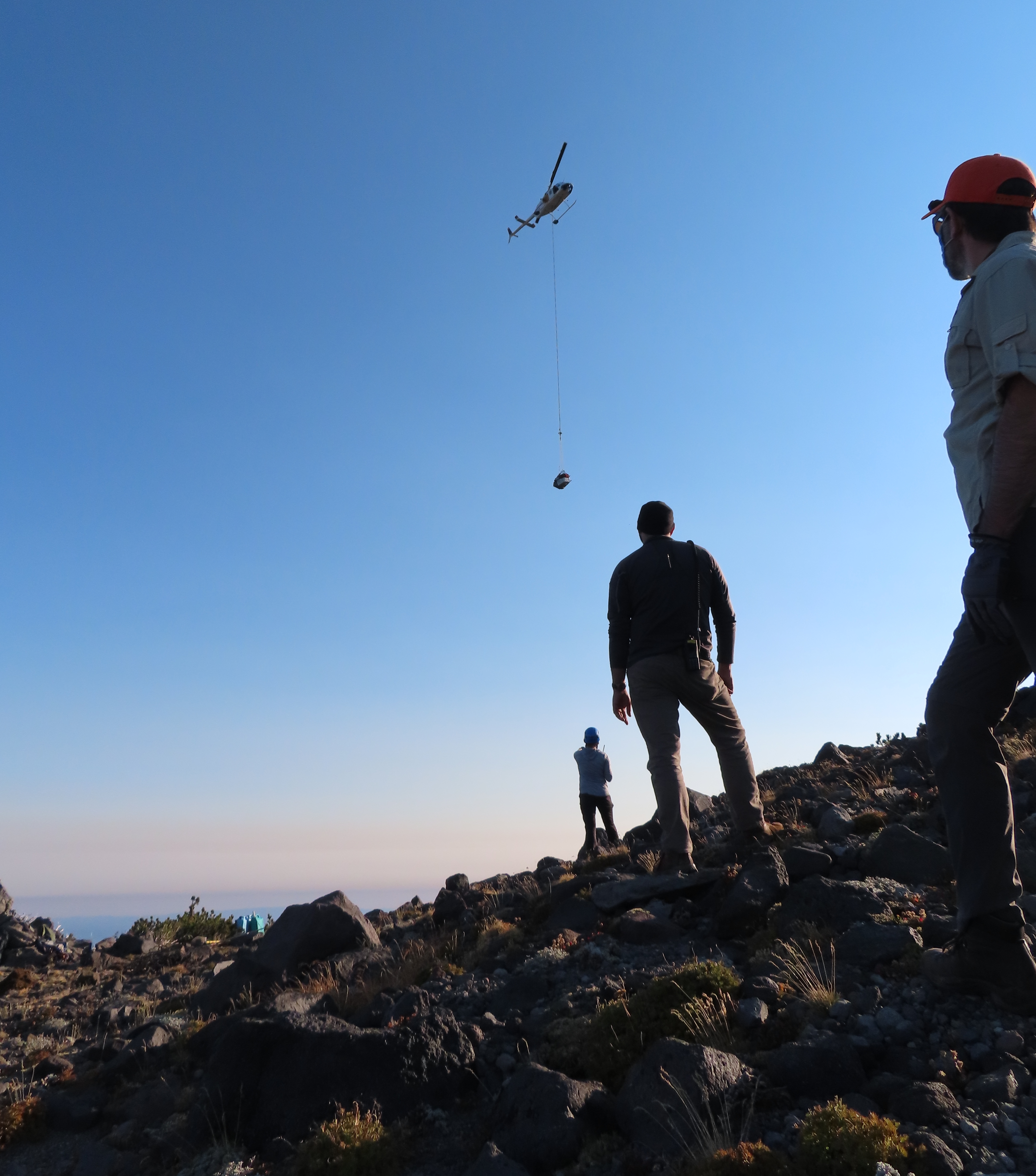
A helicopter delivers equipment to station BRSP on Mount Hood.

A conflict exists between protecting public safety and protecting the environment. In 2014, a USGS employee, Dr. Seth Moran, proposed installing new instruments on Mount Hood to warn of volcanic activity. The instruments were installed at four different locations on the mountain, including:

- three seismometers to measure earthquakes
- three Global Positioning System (GPS) instruments to measure ground movement
- one instrument to measure gas emissions

The proposed locations were in a protected wilderness area, tightly controlled by the United States Forest Service. The project was opposed by Wilderness Watch, a conservation group.

Three monitoring stations were eventually installed on Mount Hood in 2020.

== Elevation ==
Snow covered Mount Hood taken October 29, 2026

Mount Hood was first seen by European explorers in 1792 and is believed to have maintained a consistent summit elevation, varying by no more than a few feet due to mild seismic activity. Elevation changes since the 1950s are predominantly due to improved survey methods and model refinements of the shape of the Earth (see vertical reference datum). Despite the physical consistency, the estimated elevation of Mount Hood has varied substantially over the years, as seen in the following table:

Date	Stated Elevation	Source
1854	18,361 ft (5,596 m)	Thomas J. Dryer
1854	19,400 ft (5,900 m)	Belden
1857	14,000 ft (4,300 m)	Mitchell's School Atlas
1866	17,600 ft (5,400 m)	Rev. Atkinson
1867	11,225 ft (3,421 m)	Col. Williamson
1916	11,253 ft (3,430 m)	Adm. Colbert
1939	11,245 ft (3,427 m)	Adm. Colbert
1980	11,239 ft (3,426 m)	USGS using NGVD 29
1991	11,249 ft (3,429 m)	U.S. National Geodetic Survey, 1986 measurement adjusted using NAVD 88
1993	11,240 ft (3,426 m)	Scientific expedition and 11,239 ft (3,426 m) of slightly older origin
2008?	11,235 ft (3,424 m)	Encyclopedia Britannica

Mt. Hood glaciers in late July

Early explorers on the Columbia River estimated the elevation to be 10,000 to 12,000 feet (3,000 to 3,700 m). Two people in Thomas J. Dryer's 1854 expedition calculated the elevation to be 18,361 feet (5,596 m) and the tree line to be at 11,250 feet (3,430 m). Two months later, a Mr. Belden claimed to have climbed the mountain during a hunting trip and determined it to be 19,400 feet (5,900 m) upon which "pores oozed blood, eyes bled, and blood rushed from their ears." Sometime by 1866, Reverend G. H. Atkinson determined it to be 17,600 feet (5,400 m). A Portland engineer used surveying methods from a Portland baseline and calculated a height of between 18,000 and 19,000 feet (5,500 and 5,800 m). Many maps distributed in the late 19th century cited 18,361 feet (5,596 m), though Mitchell's School Atlas gave 14,000 feet (4,300 m) as the correct value. For some time, many references assumed Mount Hood to be the highest point in North America.

Modern height surveys also vary, but not by the huge margins seen in the past. A 1993 survey by a scientific party that arrived at the peak's summit with 16 pounds (7.3 kg) of electronic equipment reported a height of 11,240 feet (3,426 m), claimed to be accurate to within 1.25 inches (32 mm). Many modern sources likewise list 11,240 feet (3,426 m) as the height. However, numerous others place the peak's height one foot lower, at 11,239 feet (3,426 m). Finally, a height of 11,249 feet (3,429 m) has also been reported.

== Glaciers ==
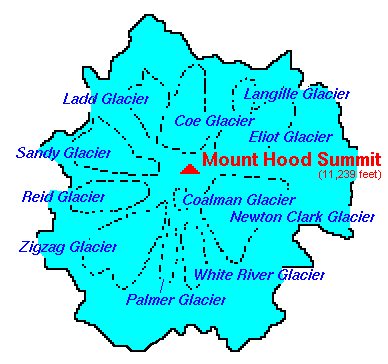
Mount Hood glaciers

Mount Hood is host to 12 named glaciers or snow fields, the most visited of which is Palmer Glacier, partially within the Timberline Lodge ski area and on the most popular climbing route. The glaciers are almost exclusively above the 6,000-foot (1,800 m) level, which also is about the average tree line elevation on Mount Hood. More than 80 percent of the glacial surface area is above 7,000 feet (2,100 m).

The glaciers and permanent snow fields have an area of 3,331 acres (1,348 ha) and contain a volume of about 282,000 acre-feet (0.348 km^{3}). Eliot Glacier is the largest glacier by volume at 73,000 acre-feet (0.09 km^{3}), and has the thickest depth measured by ice radar at 361 feet (110 m). The largest glacier by surface area is the Coe-Ladd Glacier system at 531 acres (215 ha).

Glaciers and snowfields cover about 80 percent of the mountain above the 6,900-foot (2,100 m) level. The glaciers declined by an average of 34 percent from 1907 to 2004. Glaciers on Mount Hood retreated through the first half of the 20th century, advanced or at least slowed their retreat in the 1960s and 1970s, and have since returned to a pattern of retreat. The neo-glacial maximum extents formed in the early 18th century.

During the last major glacial event between 29,000 and 10,000 years ago, glaciers reached down to the 2,600-to-2,300-foot (790 to 700 m) level, a distance of 9.3 miles (15.0 km) from the summit. The retreat released considerable outwash, some of which filled and flattened the upper Hood River Valley near Parkdale and formed Dee Flat.

Older glaciation produced moraines near Brightwood and distinctive cuts on the southeast side; they may date to 140,000 years ago.

Glacier name	Area		Volume		Notes	Coordinates
	(acres)	(km^{2})	(acre-feet)	(km^{3})		
Palmer	32	0.13	1,600	0.0020	headwaters of the Salmon River	45°21′09″N 121°42′27″W
Coalman	20	0.081	900	0.0011	located between Crater Rock and the summit	45°22′19″N 121°41′54″W
White River	133	0.54	7,000	0.0086	feeds the White River	45°21′26″N 121°41′55″W
Newton Clark	491	1.99	32,000	0.039	source of the East Fork Hood River	45°22′00″N 121°41′12″W
Eliot	415	1.68	73,000	0.090	source of Tilly Jane Creek and Eliot Branch, tributaries of Middle Fork Hood River	45°22′52″N 121°40′49″W
Langille	99	0.40	7,000	0.0086	in Hood River watershed	45°23′32″N 121°40′48″W
Coe	308	1.25	44,000	0.054	source of Coe Branch, a tributary of Middle Fork Hood River	45°23′00″N 121°41′40″W
Ladd	223	0.90	20,000	0.025	source of McGee Creek, a tributary of West Fork Hood River	45°23′32″N 121°42′22″W
Glisan						45°23′27″N 121°43′10″W
Sandy	294	1.19	2,000	0.0025	feeds Muddy Fork, a tributary of the Sandy River	45°22′47″N 121°43′00″W
Reid	195	0.79	10,000	0.012	feeds the Sandy River	45°22′15″N 121°43′08″W
Zigzag	190	0.77	10,000	0.012	feeds the Zigzag River	45°21′48″N 121°42′44″W
Total, including snow patches	3,331	13.48	282,000	0.348		

== Hiking ==
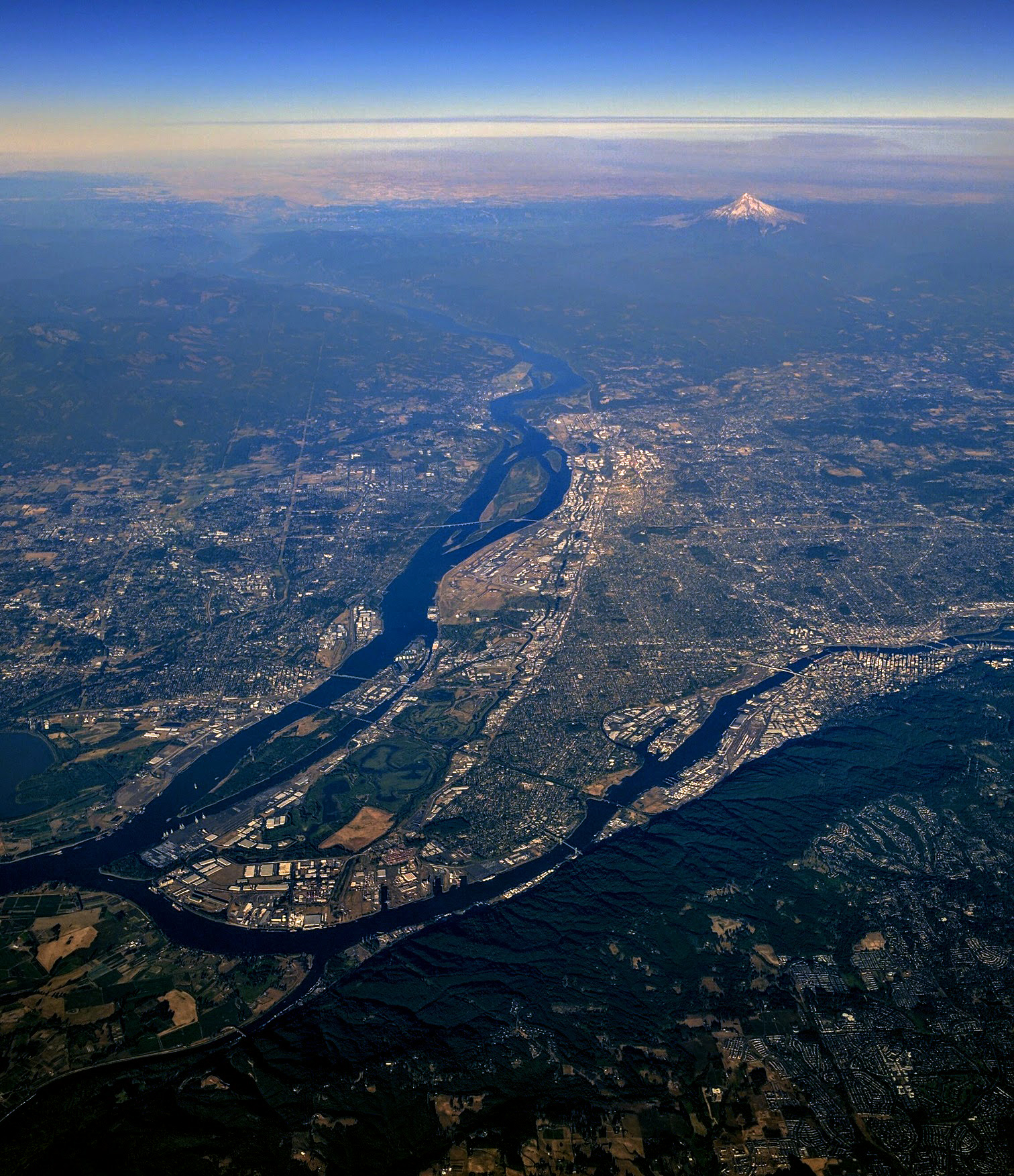
An aerial view of the Portland, OR – Vancouver, WA metro area, with Mount Hood in the background

Mt. Hood National Forest is home to approximately 1,000 miles (1,600 km) of trails. Cooper Spur Trail leads to 8,510 feet (2,590 m) in elevation, the highest reachable point one can gain on the mountain without requiring mountaineering gear.

The Timberline Trail, which circumnavigates the entire mountain and rises as high as 7,300 feet (2,200 m), was built in the 1930s by the Civilian Conservation Corps. Typically, the 40.7-mile (65.5 km) hike is snow-free from late July until the autumn snows begin. The trail includes over 10,000 feet (3,000 m) of elevation gain and loss and can vary in distance year to year depending on river crossings. There are many access points, the shortest being a small walk from the Timberline Lodge. A portion of the Pacific Crest Trail is coincident with the Timberline Trail on the west side of Mount Hood.

The predecessor of the Pacific Crest Trail was the Oregon Skyline Trail, established in 1920, which connected Mount Hood to Crater Lake.

== Climbing ==
Mount Hood is Oregon's highest point and a prominent landmark visible up to 100 miles (160 km) away. About 10,000 people attempt to climb Mount Hood each year. It has convenient access, though it presents some technical climbing challenges. There are no trails to the summit, with even the "easier" southside climbing route constituting a technical climb with crevasses, falling rocks, and often inclement weather. Ropes, ice axes, crampons and other technical mountaineering gear are necessary. Peak climbing season is generally from April to mid-June.

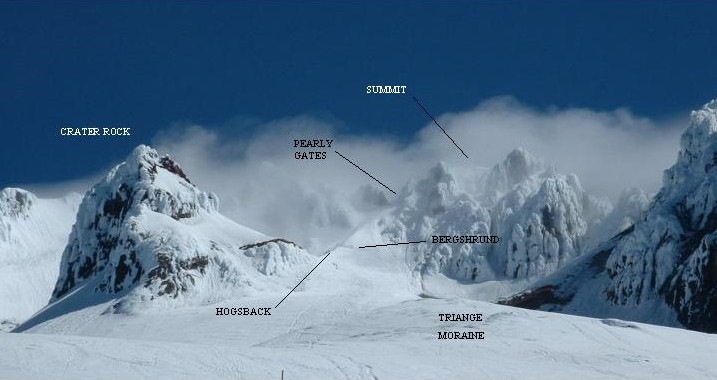
Landmarks along the southern climbing route of Mount Hood

There are six main routes to approach the mountain, with about 30 total variations for summiting. The climbs range in difficulty from class 2 to class 5.9+ (for Arachnophobia). The most popular route, dubbed the south route, begins at Timberline Lodge and proceeds up Palmer Glacier to Crater Rock, the large prominence at the head of the glacier. The route goes east around Crater Rock and crosses the Coalman Glacier on the Hogsback, a ridge spanning from Crater Rock to the approach to the summit. The Hogsback terminates at a bergschrund where the Coalman Glacier separates from the summit rock headwall. The route continues to the Pearly Gates, a gap in the summit rock formation, then right onto the summit plateau and the summit proper.

Technical ice axes, fall protection, and experience are now recommended in order to attempt the left chute variation or Pearly Gates ice chute. The Forest Service recommends several other route options due to these changes in conditions (e.g. "Old Chute," West Crater Rim, etc.).

=== Climbing accidents ===
As of May 2002, more than 130 people had died in climbing-related accidents since records have been kept on Mount Hood, the first in 1896. Incidents in May 1986, December 2006, and December 2009 attracted intense national and international media interest. Though avalanches are a common hazard on other glaciated mountains, most Mount Hood climbing deaths are the result of falls and hypothermia. Around 50 people require rescue per year. 3.4 percent of search and rescue missions in 2006 were for mountain climbers.

== Climate ==
The summit of Mount Hood has a typical dry-summer alpine climate (Köppen: ETs), with temperatures below 32 °F (0 °C) eight months of the year and no month with an average temperature above 50 °F (10 °C). Even in the hottest months, nightly average temperatures often dip below 32 °F (0 °C), and frost occurs almost every day, even in summer or the hottest time of year. Otherwise, all months have a dew point below 32 °F (0 °C).

Climate data for Mount Hood, 1991–2020 normals (3001m)
Month	Jan	Feb	Mar	Apr	May	Jun	Jul	Aug	Sep	Oct	Nov	Dec	Year
Mean daily maximum °F (°C)	24.5 (−4.2)	23.8 (−4.6)	24.7 (−4.1)	28.3 (−2.1)	37.0 (2.8)	44.0 (6.7)	54.9 (12.7)	55.2 (12.9)	50.1 (10.1)	39.7 (4.3)	27.9 (−2.3)	23.3 (−4.8)	36.1 (2.3)
Daily mean °F (°C)	18.9 (−7.3)	16.9 (−8.4)	16.9 (−8.4)	19.4 (−7.0)	27.0 (−2.8)	33.2 (0.7)	42.6 (5.9)	43.0 (6.1)	38.5 (3.6)	30.2 (−1.0)	21.8 (−5.7)	17.9 (−7.8)	27.2 (−2.7)
Mean daily minimum °F (°C)	13.3 (−10.4)	10.0 (−12.2)	9.0 (−12.8)	10.5 (−11.9)	16.9 (−8.4)	22.4 (−5.3)	30.3 (−0.9)	30.7 (−0.7)	26.9 (−2.8)	20.8 (−6.2)	15.7 (−9.1)	12.5 (−10.8)	18.3 (−7.6)
Average precipitation inches (mm)	17.99 (457)	13.55 (344)	14.29 (363)	11.40 (290)	7.67 (195)	5.84 (148)	1.37 (35)	1.82 (46)	4.57 (116)	10.86 (276)	17.45 (443)	18.83 (478)	125.64 (3,191)
Average dew point °F (°C)	12.8 (−10.7)	9.6 (−12.4)	8.6 (−13.0)	10.5 (−11.9)	16.0 (−8.9)	21.0 (−6.1)	26.5 (−3.1)	25.4 (−3.7)	21.4 (−5.9)	18.4 (−7.6)	15.1 (−9.4)	12.7 (−10.7)	16.5 (−8.6)
Source: PRISM Climate Group

Climate data for Mount Hood 45.3744 N, 121.6999 W, Elevation: 10,407 ft (3,172 m) (1991–2020 normals)
Month	Jan	Feb	Mar	Apr	May	Jun	Jul	Aug	Sep	Oct	Nov	Dec	Year
Mean daily maximum °F (°C)	22.8 (−5.1)	22.1 (−5.5)	23.0 (−5.0)	26.6 (−3.0)	35.3 (1.8)	42.4 (5.8)	53.2 (11.8)	53.5 (11.9)	48.4 (9.1)	38.1 (3.4)	26.3 (−3.2)	21.7 (−5.7)	34.5 (1.4)
Daily mean °F (°C)	17.1 (−8.3)	15.1 (−9.4)	15.0 (−9.4)	17.6 (−8.0)	25.1 (−3.8)	31.4 (−0.3)	40.8 (4.9)	41.1 (5.1)	36.7 (2.6)	28.5 (−1.9)	20.1 (−6.6)	16.2 (−8.8)	25.4 (−3.7)
Mean daily minimum °F (°C)	11.4 (−11.4)	8.0 (−13.3)	7.1 (−13.8)	8.5 (−13.1)	14.9 (−9.5)	20.5 (−6.4)	28.3 (−2.1)	28.7 (−1.8)	25.0 (−3.9)	19.0 (−7.2)	13.9 (−10.1)	10.7 (−11.8)	16.3 (−8.7)
Average precipitation inches (mm)	17.24 (438)	13.05 (331)	13.90 (353)	10.94 (278)	7.40 (188)	5.60 (142)	1.34 (34)	1.77 (45)	4.52 (115)	10.64 (270)	16.74 (425)	18.63 (473)	121.77 (3,092)
Source: PRISM Climate Group

== See also ==
- Gentlemen's Race (2008)
- List of Ultras of the United States
- Mount Hood climbing accidents
- Mount Hood Corridor
- Mount Hood Railroad
