= Zigzag Ranger Station =

- U.S. National Register of Historic Places
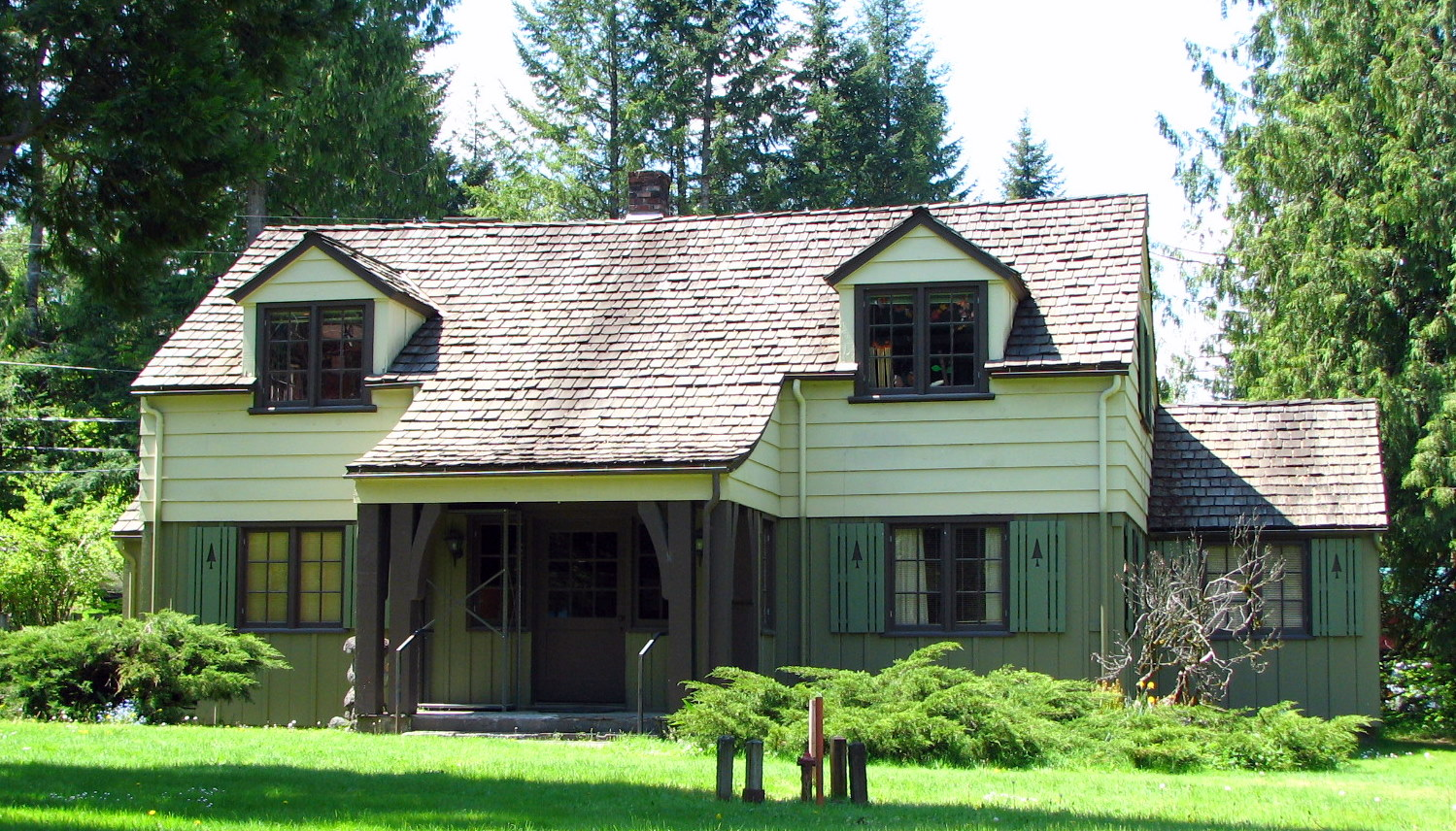
- Zigzag District Office
- Location: Mount Hood National Forest
- Nearest city: Zigzag, Oregon, USA
- Coordinates: 45.342063°N 121.942024°W
- Built: 1935
- Architectural style: Cascadian rustic
- NRHP reference No.: 86000842
- Added to NRHP: 1986

The Zigzag Ranger Station is a Forest Service compound consisting of twenty rustic buildings located in Oregon's Mount Hood National Forest. It was built as the administrative headquarters for the Zigzag Ranger District. It is located in the small unincorporated community of Zigzag, Oregon. Many of the historic buildings were constructed by the Civilian Conservation Corps between 1933 and 1942. Today, the Forest Service still uses the ranger station as the Zigzag Ranger District headquarters. The ranger station is listed on the National Register of Historic Places.

== History ==
In the early 20th century, the forest road networks were not well developed. To facilitate work in National Forests, the Forest Service built district ranger stations at strategic locations within the forest to house full-time employees and provide logistics support to fire patrols and project crews working at remote forest sites. After World War II, the Forest Service greatly expanded its road network, allowing employees to get to most forest areas within a few hours. As a result, many of the more isolated ranger stations were closed or converted to summer guard station. However, the Zigzag Ranger Station has served as a district headquarters since it was built.

In 1908, the Forest Service established the Oregon National Forest around Mount Hood in north central Oregon. The first Forest Service building at the Zigzag site was constructed in 1917. Several other buildings were added to the compound in the 1920s. In 1924, a large part of the Oregon National Forest was redesignated as the Mount Hood National Forest; this included the Zigzag Ranger District. In 1933, the Civilian Conservation Corps began doing construction work at the ranger station. Between 1933 and 1942, Civilian Conservation Corps crews built nine ranger station buildings. The Civilian Conservation Corps workers came from nearby Camp Zigzag, and worked under the supervision of Forest Service rangers. All of the buildings constructed during that period were designed by the Forest Service's Pacific Northwest Regional Architecture Group, and were built in the Cascadian rustic style.

Today, the ranger station still serves as the administrative headquarters for the Zigzag Ranger District. There are twenty buildings that make up the ranger station complex. Nineteen of those buildings plus one additional structure (a stone masonry wall built by the Civilian Conservation Corps) are historically important. All of the historic buildings are still in use and are in excellent condition. Because the Zigzag Ranger Station is of unique historic value as an early Forest Service ranger station, the compound and surrounding area was listed on the National Register of Historic Places on 8 April 1986. The historic site covers a total of 125 acres (0.51 km^{2}).

== Structures ==
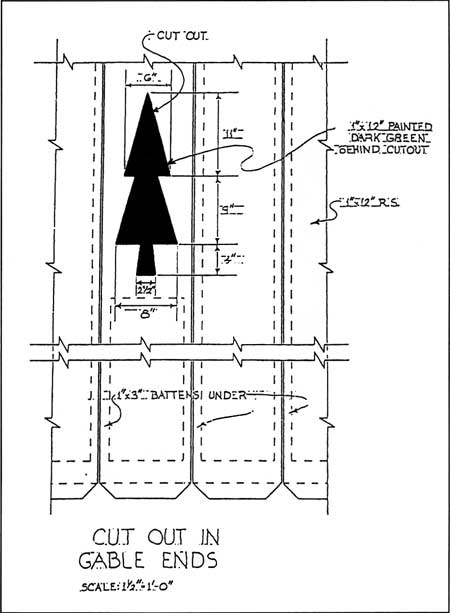
Forest Service open pine tree logo design

With nineteen historic buildings, the Zigzag Ranger Station is a classic Forest Service range station. Nine of the historic buildings were built by the Civilian Conservation Corps between 1933 and 1942. Their work included a district administrative office, ranger's residences, a crew bunkhouse, a fire equipment warehouse, two warehouses for road and trail equipment, a carpenter shop, a garage, and a gas house. The buildings were constructed in the Cascadian rustic architectural style using weatherboard, wood shingles, native stone, and concrete as the principle building materials. Many of the gables and shutters have the open pine tree logo common to Forest Service structures built during the 1930s. The Civilian Conservation Corps also built a random-course stone walls at the ranger station.

- The Ranger's Office is a two-story, rectangular building, 53 feet (16 m) across the front and 41 feet (12 m) along the sides. It has a gabled roof with a stone chimney and no eaves. There are dormers on each side of the roof. The lower half of the office is board-and-batten construction; the upper half is built with horizontal clapboard. The front and back porches have 10-inch-square support posts with curved braces and stone floors.
- The Ranger's Residence is a rectangular frame building with stone foundation and a gabled roof. The gables are filled with vertical boards with open pine tree logo cutouts. The front porch is supported by square posts. Next to the residence is a matching Garage with the same siding and tree logo cutouts. In 2007, the Forest Service replaced the old wood shake roofs on both the residence and garage with new heavy wood shakes.
- The large two-story Bunkhouse also served as a residence for the assistant rangers. Like the office, the bunkhouse has board-and-batten siding on its lower level with horizontal clapboard above. There is an above-ground concrete foundation in the front to make the house level against slightly sloping ground. The front porch is placed off-center. There is also a side porch with an overhanging roof. Both porches are supported by 10-inch-square posts with curved wooden braces.
- Like the office and bunkhouse, the Fire Warehouse is a two-story frame building with board-and-batten siding on its lower half and horizontal clapboard on the upper half. It has a gable roof with four dormers and no eaves. The front porch has 10-inch (250 mm) square posts. There is a garage door entry on the right side of the building. There is also a second-floor side entrance accessed from an outside stairway.

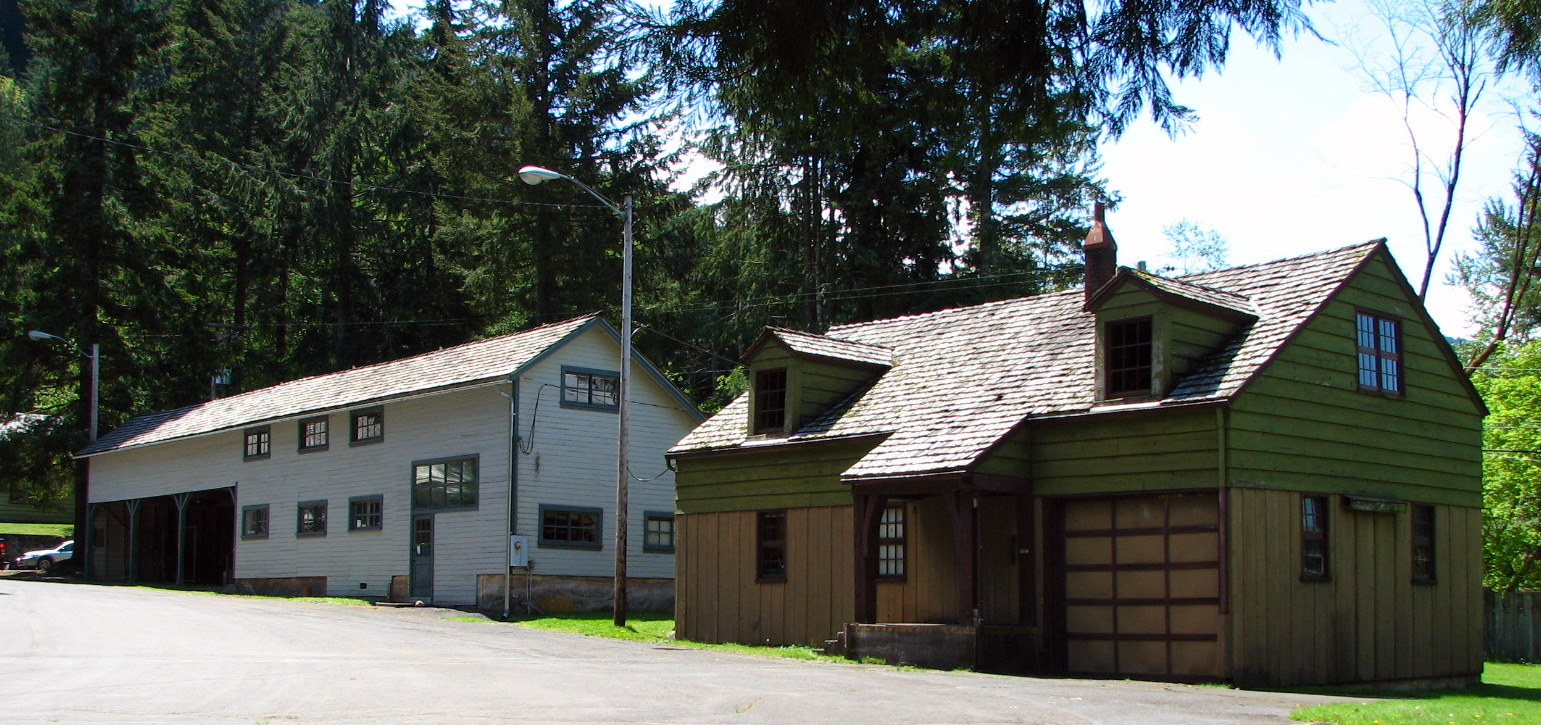
Historic shop buildings at the Zigzag Ranger Station

- There are two Road and Trail Warehouse buildings. The first warehouse is a large rectangular frame building with clapboard siding and sliding garage doors. The second warehouse is a frame building with a saltbox roof. Both buildings are original, but have been altered over time.
- The Carpenter Shop is a long rectangular building, approximately 80 feet (24 m) by 45 feet (14 m). The shop has a gabled roof with four dormer windows. The two gabled ends project out, creating slight overhangs. There is vertical siding below the overhang with Forest Service pine tree logo cutouts. The rest of the building has clapboard siding. There are large garage doors lining the front of the building.
- The Gas House is a frame building with shiplap siding and a gable roof. The roof framework is open at the gable ends, and a large projecting overhang shelters the gas pumps and vehicle service area.

== Wy'East Rhododendron Gardens ==
The Wy'East Rhododendron Gardens are located on the grounds of the Zigzag Ranger Station. The gardens were conceived in 1952 as a roadside beautification project. Local nurseries and individual horticulturists donated 100 plants to start the garden. When it was officially dedicated on 24 May 1953, the garden had grown to 235 rhododendron plants. James P. Langdon, the Zigzag District Ranger at the time, donated additional trees and shrubs from his private nursery to complement the rhododendrons, including the rare Dawn Redwood.

While not all the original plants survived, Wy'East Rhododendron Gardens still have examples of 50 different types of rhododendron and over 150 other plants. The gardens offer an opportunity to enjoy many trees and shrubs native to the Mount Hood National Forest at one location as well as many non-native plant species. The grounds are open year-round for self-guided tours. A garden map that show where to find all 50 rhododendron varieties is available at the Zigzag district office.

== Location ==
The Zigzag Ranger Station is in eastern Clackamas County, Oregon surrounded by the Mount Hood National Forest. The elevation at the site is 1,460 feet (450 m) above sea level. The forest around the ranger station is made up of Douglas fir, Western red cedar, big leaf maple, vine maple, red alder, cascara buckthorn, and Pacific dogwood.

The Zigzag Ranger Station is located 45 miles (72 km) east of Portland, Oregon in the small unincorporated community of Zigzag. The ranger station is just off U.S. Highway 26. The ranger station has facilities on both sides of the highway; however, the office and most of the historic buildings are located on the south side of the highway along with the Wy'East Rhododendron Gardens.
