= Mount Hood Railway and Power Company =

The Mount Hood Railway and Power Company, also known as the Mount Hood Company, initiated hydroelectric development in the Sandy River basin in the U.S. state of Oregon in 1906. Its Bull Run Hydroelectric Project included a powerhouse on the Bull Run River, a tributary of the Sandy River, and a diversion dam on the Little Sandy River, a tributary of the Bull Run River. Water from the dam, which was about 16 feet (4.9 m) high, flowed through a wooden flume about 17,000 feet (5,200 m) long to Roslyn Lake and from there to the powerhouse. The company began using the powerhouse to generate electricity in 1912.

To start the project, the company needed improved access to the powerhouse site. At the time, it took three hours by stagecoach to reach Bull Run from an electric railway depot in Boring. Roads in the area had to be planked to be usable during heavy rains. Access improved in mid-1911, when the company finished construction on a railway line between the Montavilla neighborhood in east Portland and the community of Bull Run.

The Mount Hood Railway and Power Company line, 22 miles (35 km) long, began as a steam locomotive railway. In 1912, the company merged with the Portland Railway, Light and Power Company (PRL&P), which later modified the line for use by electric trolleys, and operated it as its Mount Hood Line interurban service. PRL&P was the predecessor of Portland General Electric. Interurban service to Bull Run ended in 1930. In the 21st century, part of the Metropolitan Area Express (MAX) Blue Line, a light-rail corridor between Portland and Gresham, overlaps the former PRL&P right-of-way. PRL&P interurban service along the section of East Burnside Street that is now used by MAX, between I-205 and Ruby Junction (near 197th Avenue), was abandoned in 1927.
