= Sandy Glacier =

Glacier on Mount Hood, Oregon, United States

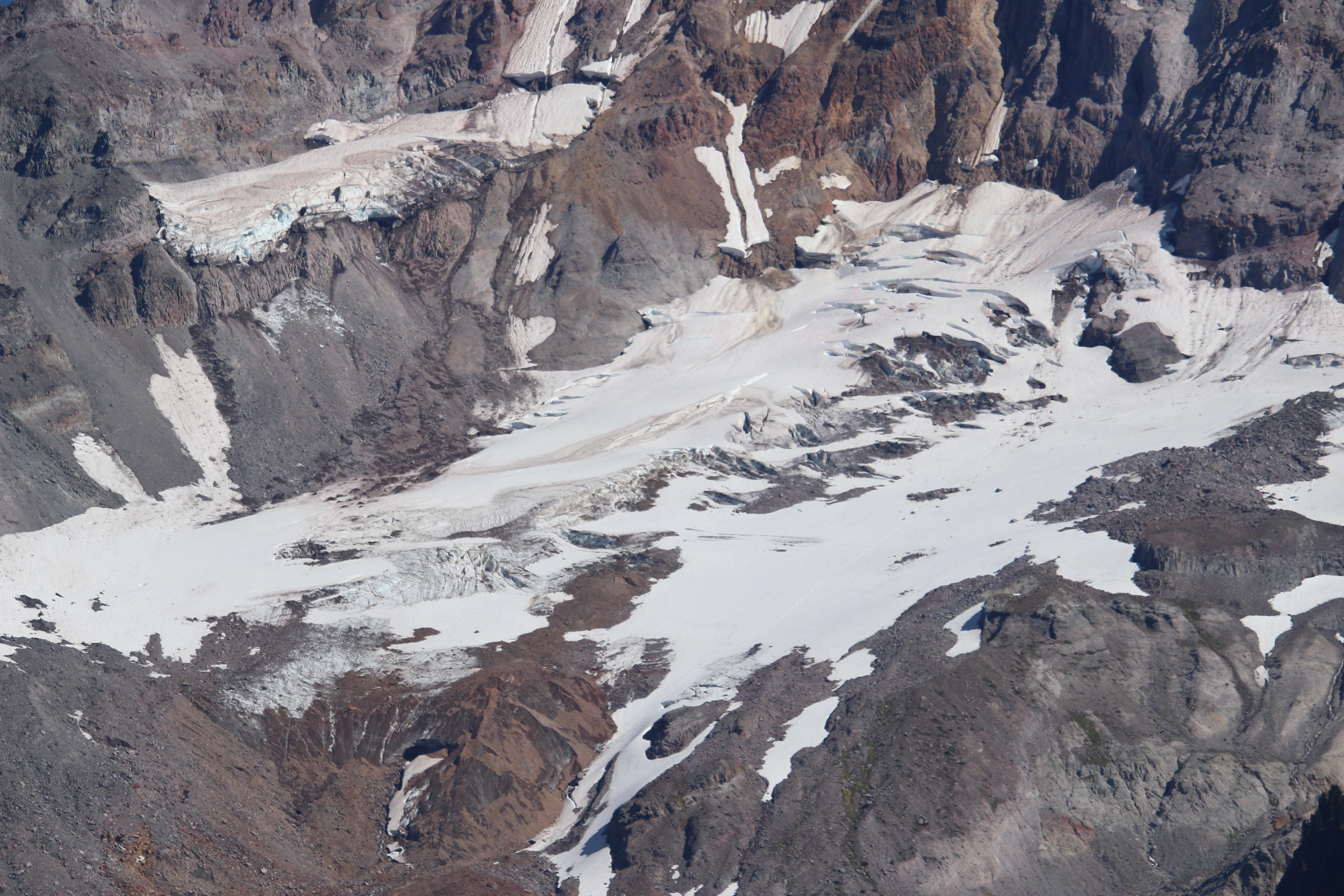

- Location within Oregon
- Type: Mountain glacier
- Location: Clackamas County, Oregon, United States
- Coordinates: 45°22′51″N 121°43′08″W
- Area: 237 acres (96 ha) (2004 estimate)
- Terminus: Ice fall
- Status: Retreating

Sandy Glacier is an alpine glacier located on the west slope of Mount Hood in the U.S. state of Oregon. It extends in elevation from about 8,800 to 6,000 feet (2,700 to 1,800 m). The glacier is the source of Muddy Fork, a tributary of the Sandy River. The upper extent of the glacier is known for extensive crevasses. The lower extent was marked by the Sandy Glacier Caves, possibly the largest glacier cave system in the lower 48 U.S. states.

The glacier is a remnant of the massive glaciers that formed during the last ice age. It is bounded on the south by Yocum Ridge which also defines the northern side of Reid Glacier, and by a ridge on the north which defines part of the Hood River-Clackamas county border which also bounds the south side of Glisan Glacier. The glacier lies entirely within Mount Hood Wilderness.

Sandy Glacier decreased in area by 40% between 1907 and 2004. The glacier terminus has retreated by 690 metres (2,260 ft) over the same time period.

== See also ==
- List of glaciers in the United States
- Wrenn Peak
