= Muddy Fork =

Muddy Fork may refer to:

- Muddy Fork (North Fork Salt River tributary), a stream in Missouri
- Muddy Fork (Oregon), a stream in Oregon
- Muddy Fork, a tributary of the Cispus River in Washington
