= Ramona Falls =

Ramona Falls may refer to:

- Ramona Falls (Oregon), a waterfall on the upper Sandy River on Mount Hood
- Ramona Falls (band), a musical group formed in 2009
