= Little Sandy River (Oregon) =

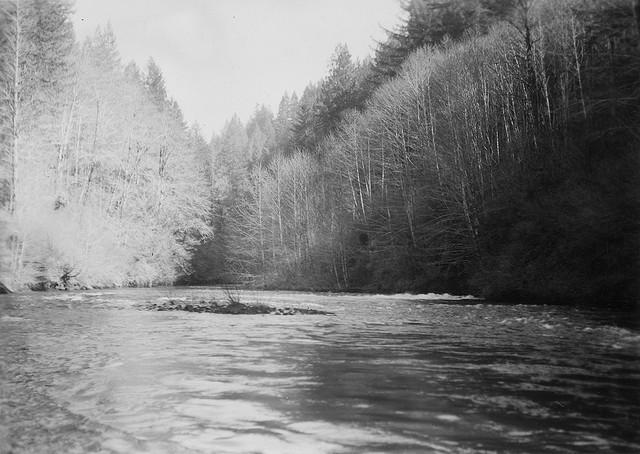
- The Little Sandy River in March 1940

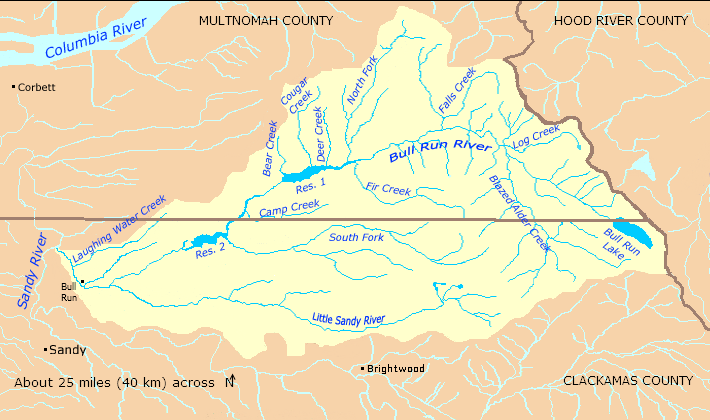
- Bull Run River watershed

- Location of the mouth of the Little Sandy River in Oregon
- Etymology: The Sandy River, which was called Quicksand River in 1805 by Lewis and Clark because of "emence quantitys of sand" at the mouth; apparently shortened to Sandy River locally by 1845–50

Location
- Country: United States
- State: Oregon
- County: Clackamas County

Physical characteristics
- Source: Mount Hood National Forest
  - location: Near Hickman Butte, west of Mount Hood, Clackamas County, Oregon
  - coordinates: 45°24′13″N 121°55′58″W
  - elevation: 3,383 ft (1,031 m)
- Mouth: Bull Run River
  - location: near Bull Run, Clackamas County, Oregon
  - coordinates: 45°25′34″N 122°12′24″W
  - elevation: 449 ft (137 m)
- Length: 15 mi (24 km)
- Basin size: 22.3 sq mi (58 km^{2})
- Discharge
  - location: 1.95 miles (3.14 km) from the mouth
  - average: 143 cu ft/s (4.0 m^{3}/s)
  - minimum: 8 cu ft/s (0.23 m^{3}/s)
  - maximum: 5,320 cu ft/s (151 m^{3}/s)

The Little Sandy River is a tributary, roughly 15 miles (24 km) long, of the Bull Run River in the U.S. state of Oregon. Forming west of Mount Hood in the Mount Hood National Forest, it flows generally west, roughly parallel to the Sandy River to the south. Its entire course lies in Clackamas County, and most of its main stem and tributaries are within the Bull Run Watershed Management Unit (BRWMU), a restricted zone that protects Portland's main water supply.

In 2008, Portland General Electric (PGE) removed the Little Sandy Dam, the only dam on the river, while decommissioning its Bull Run Hydroelectric Project. This made possible, for the first time in nearly a century, the return of migratory salmon and steelhead to the river. In 2009, both types of fish were reported spawning above the former dam site.

== Course ==
Arising southeast of Hickman Butte in the Mount Hood National Forest, the river flows northwest between North Mountain on the left and Goodfellow Lakes on the right. Turning west, it passes south of Aschoff Buttes before receiving its only named tributaries, Bow Creek and Arrow Creek, both from the right. As the river nears a United States Geological Survey (USGS) stream gauge at river mile (RM) 1.95 or river kilometer (RK) 3.14, a ridge, the Devil's Backbone, separates the Little Sandy from the Sandy River to the south. Just below the stream gauge, the Little Sandy passes the former Little Sandy Dam. The river enters the Bull Run River about 2 miles (3.2 km) from the larger stream's confluence with the Sandy River. Falling 2,934 feet (894 m) between source and mouth, the river's average loss of elevation is about 196 feet per mile (37.1 m/km).

Most of the course of the river lies within the BRWMU, a federally protected area of 143 square miles (370 km^{2}) surrounding the main drinking water supply for Portland. Access to the BRWMU is generally limited to government employees and guests on official business, and security guards keep watch on its three gated entrances. In 1996, the U.S. Congress banned commercial logging on all federal lands in the Bull Run River watershed and, through the Little Sandy Act of 2001, extended the ban to include all federal lands draining into the Little Sandy River and the lower Bull Run River.

=== Discharge ===
The USGS monitors the flow of the Little Sandy River at a stream gauge 1.95 miles (3.14 km) from the mouth of the river. The average flow at this gauge over the 89 years from 1920 to 2008 was 143 cubic feet per second (4.0 m^{3}/s). This was from a drainage area of 22.3 square miles (58 km^{2}). The maximum flow recorded there was 5,320 cubic feet per second (151 m^{3}/s) on November 20, 1921, and the minimum flow was 8 cubic feet per second (0.23 m^{3}/s) on August 20 and September 16 and 17, 1940.

== Little Sandy Dam ==
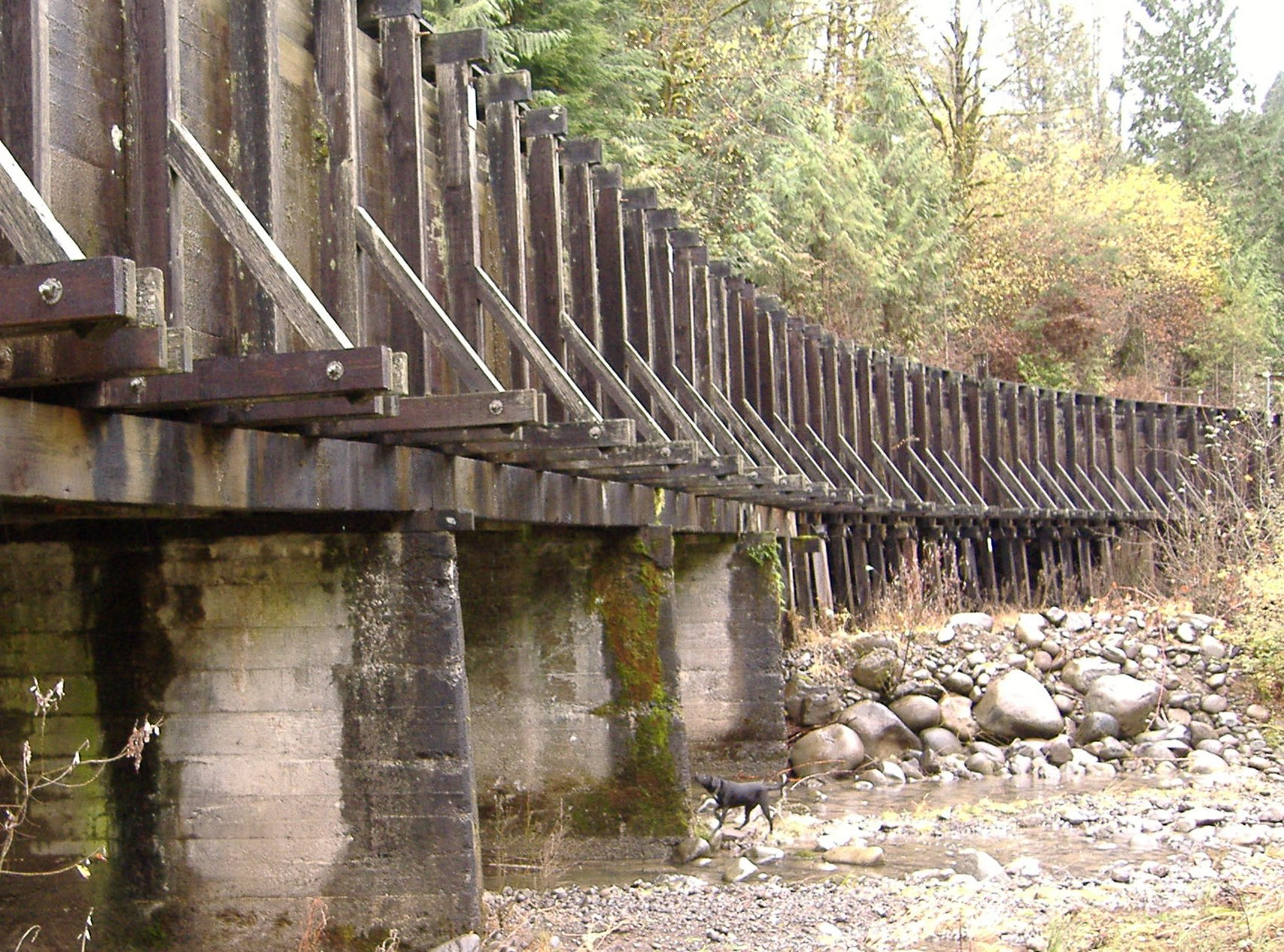
Flume that carried the Little Sandy's water over its dry riverbed to Roslyn Lake

From 1912 through 2008, the river's flow was altered by the Bull Run Hydroelectric Project, which diverted water from the Sandy River at the Marmot Dam to the Little Sandy River at the Little Sandy Dam. Water was then diverted from the Little Sandy River to Roslyn Lake through a wood box flume. The artificial lake supplied the 22-megawatt Bull Run hydroelectric powerhouse and emptied into the Bull Run River.

Engineers demolished the 47-foot (14 m) high Marmot Dam for PGE in July 2007 and the 16-foot (4.9 m) high Little Sandy Dam in 2008, and Roslyn Lake ceased to exist. The decommissioning restored the Little Sandy River to steelhead and salmon runs for the first time in nearly a century. PGE, the dams' owner, donated 1,500 acres (6.1 km^{2}) of land near the dams to the Western Rivers Conservancy for a nature reserve and recreation area. In May 2009, a fish biologist reported that salmon and steelhead were spawning upstream of the former dam.

== See also ==
- List of rivers of Oregon
