= Reid Glacier (Oregon) =

Glacier on Mount Hood, Oregon, United States

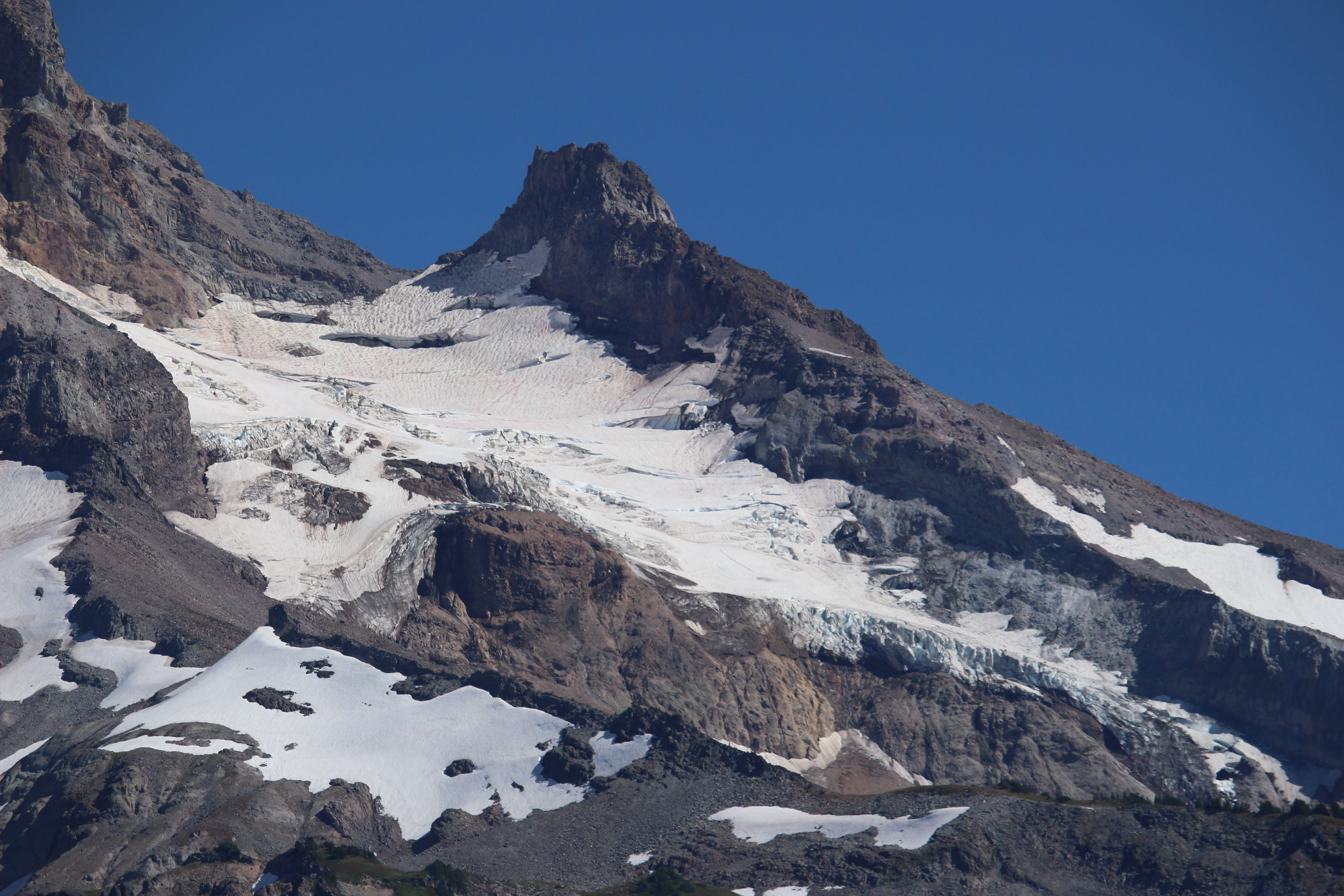

- Location within Oregon
- Type: Mountain glacier
- Location: Clackamas County, Oregon, United States
- Coordinates: 45°22′15″N 121°43′08″W
- Area: 126 acres (51 ha) (2004 estimate)
- Length: .75 mi (1.21 km)
- Terminus: Ice fall
- Status: Retreating

Reid Glacier is an alpine glacier located on the west slope of Mount Hood in the U.S. state of Oregon. It ranges in elevation from about 9,800 to 6,000 feet (3,000 to 1,800 m). The glacier is the source of the Sandy River. The upper extent of the glacier is known for extensive crevasses.

The glacier is a remnant of the massive glaciers that formed during the last ice age. It is bounded on the north by Yokum Ridge which also defines the southern side of Sandy Glacier, and by a ridge on the south bounding the north side of Zigzag Glacier. The eastern and upper reaches of this ridge include Illumination Rock. The uppermost portion of the glacier is below Leuthold Couloir. The glacier lies entirely within Mount Hood Wilderness.

Between 1907 and 2004, Reid Glacier lost 35% of its surface area. The glacier terminus has retreated by 1,607 feet (490 m) over the same time period.

== Climate ==
Illumination Rock lies on the upper eastern side of Reid Glacier. There is no weather station, but this climate table contains interpolated data.

Climate data for Illumination Rock 45.3689 N, 121.7070 W, Elevation: 9,350 ft (2,850 m) (1991–2020 normals)
Month	Jan	Feb	Mar	Apr	May	Jun	Jul	Aug	Sep	Oct	Nov	Dec	Year
Mean daily maximum °F (°C)	26.0 (−3.3)	25.3 (−3.7)	26.2 (−3.2)	29.8 (−1.2)	38.5 (3.6)	45.5 (7.5)	56.5 (13.6)	56.8 (13.8)	51.6 (10.9)	41.0 (5.0)	29.3 (−1.5)	24.7 (−4.1)	37.6 (3.1)
Daily mean °F (°C)	20.5 (−6.4)	18.5 (−7.5)	18.4 (−7.6)	21.0 (−6.1)	28.6 (−1.9)	34.8 (1.6)	44.3 (6.8)	44.6 (7.0)	40.1 (4.5)	31.7 (−0.2)	23.3 (−4.8)	19.4 (−7.0)	28.8 (−1.8)
Mean daily minimum °F (°C)	15.0 (−9.4)	11.7 (−11.3)	10.7 (−11.8)	12.2 (−11.0)	18.6 (−7.4)	24.1 (−4.4)	32.0 (0.0)	32.4 (0.2)	28.6 (−1.9)	22.4 (−5.3)	17.3 (−8.2)	14.1 (−9.9)	19.9 (−6.7)
Average precipitation inches (mm)	16.48 (419)	12.42 (315)	13.30 (338)	10.27 (261)	7.04 (179)	5.39 (137)	1.28 (33)	1.81 (46)	4.30 (109)	10.19 (259)	15.74 (400)	17.88 (454)	116.1 (2,950)
Source: PRISM Climate Group

== See also ==
- List of glaciers in the United States
