= Timberline Trail =

Hiking trail in Oregon, USA

Coordinates: 45°24′10″N 121°43′46″W

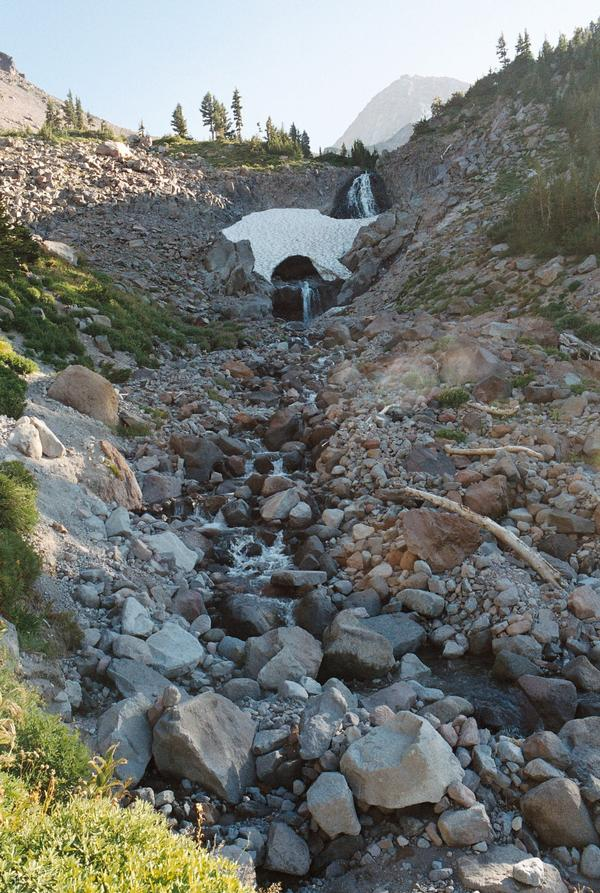
- View of the north side of Mount Hood from the Timberline Trail
- Length: 40.7 mi (65.5 km)
- Location: Mount Hood, Oregon, United States
- Use: Hiking
- Elevation change: 9,000 feet (2,700 m)
- Highest point: Lamberson Spur, 7,300 ft (2,200 m)
- Lowest point: Sandy River 3,240 feet (990 m)
- Season: Summer to early Fall
- Months: Mid-July through early October
- Hazards: stream crossings

Timberline Trail is a hiking trail circling Mount Hood in the U.S. state of Oregon. It is mostly in wilderness but also goes near Timberline Lodge, Cloud Cap Inn (the oldest building on Mount Hood), and Mount Hood Meadows ski area.

== History ==
The Timberline Trail was constructed in the 1930s by the Civilian Conservation Corps, the majority of their work taking place in the summer of 1934 at a cost of $10,000. Sections of the trail have changed due to damage caused by landslides and washouts since then.

In September 1938 a group of hikers completed the entire trail (36 miles at the time) in 47 hours, making local news and increasing awareness of the trail.

== Hiking the trail ==
The hike is typically completed in three to five days, but some ambitious hikers complete it in one or two days. The trail, Forest Service trail #600, shares eleven miles (18 km) with the Pacific Crest Trail and alternates above and below the timberline. The trail is rerouted periodically due to washouts and to avoid sensitive high altitude and alpine meadows. It has a handful of informal campsites for backpackers, although camping is permitted anywhere outside the meadows and at least 200 feet (61 m) from water bodies. There are several hazardous river and stream crossings, especially on the west side of the mountain and at the landslide-prone Eliot Branch near Cloud Cap which closed the trail there in 2007. The trail has several significant vertical ascents and descents totaling 9,000 feet (2,700 m), mostly at canyon crossings.

The trail is most easily accessible from Timberline Lodge, which has Forest Service permitted parking (which you can purchase at Timberline Lodge) for backpackers, as well as public transit access by Mt. Hood Express bus. It can also be accessed from Mt. Hood Meadows Ski Resort and numerous connecting trails from trailheads around the mountain. There are multiple popular trail variations one can add as well, including Ramona Falls and Paradise Loop Trail.

== Hazards ==
Risks associated with hiking along the Timberline Trail include hypothermia, falling, and drowning. Areas of special concern are the Sandy River crossing, where a hiker drowned in 2004, the Eliot Creek, which washed out and closed a section of the trail in 2007, and the Muddy Fork section, which washed out in 2007 and has deteriorated to a point where it is "barely passable" according to a United States Forest Service sign. The Sandy River can be crossed on log bridges that are erected seasonally.

A storm in November 2006 washed out The Eliot Creek section of the trail. Since then, hikers have either had to scramble down the loose and hazardous slopes or climb higher (onto the Eliot Glacier). There has been some discussion about re-routing the trail below the washout with the possibility of building a suspension bridge.

The Muddy Fork section can be avoided by taking the Pacific Crest Trail (Trail 2000) from Bald Mountain to Trail 797 to Ramona Falls. This not only makes the hike much safer, but also shortens the total hike by 2.4 miles (3.9 km). A common problem with this shortcut is that the signs at the Bald Mountain crossroads mislabel the Pacific Crest Trail due to a re-routing of the Pacific Crest Trail several years ago.

The August and September 2011 Dollar Lake fire temporarily closed the Timberline Trail. It is open through the burned sections as of 2012.

== See also ==
- Wonderland Trail
