= Elk Cove =

Elk Cove may refer to:

- Elk Cove (Oregon), a meadow in the Mount Hood Wilderness in the U.S. state of Oregon
- Elk Cove, Oregon, a fictional location that is the setting for the 1987 movie Overboard
