= Biglow Canyon Wind Farm =

Wind farm in Oregon, USA

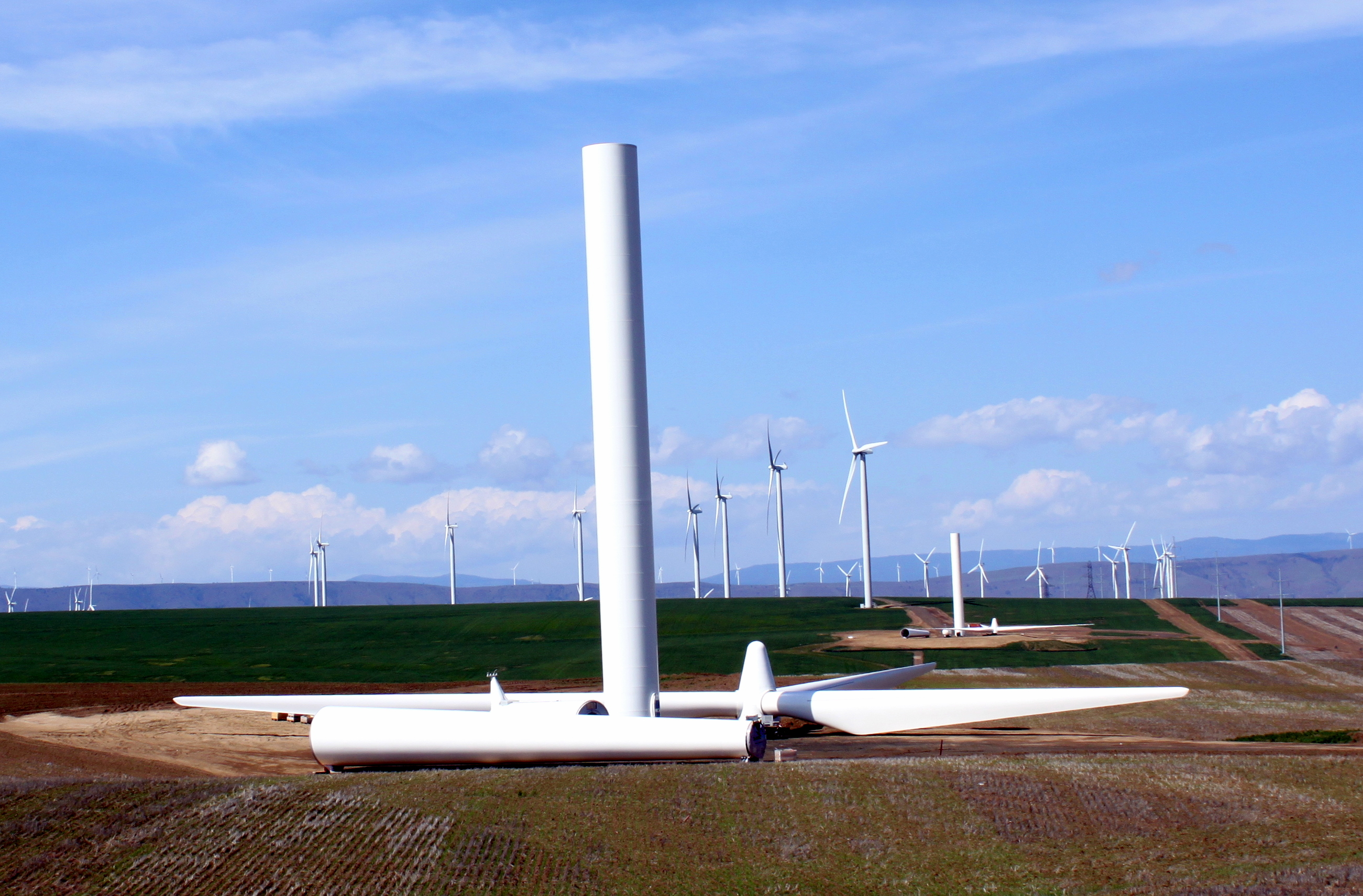
- Part of the Biglow Canyon Wind Farm, with a turbine under construction
- Country: United States
- Location: Sherman County, Oregon, United States
- Coordinates: 45°38′15″N 120°36′19″W
- Status: Operational
- Commission date: 2005
- Owner: Portland General Electric

Wind farm
- Type: Onshore

Power generation
- Units operational: 217
- Make and model: Vestas V82-1.65 MW; Siemens SWT-2.3 MW
- Nameplate capacity: 450 MW
- Capacity factor: 27.1% (average 2012-2018)
- Annual net output: 1,069 GW·h

External links
- Commons: Related media on Commons

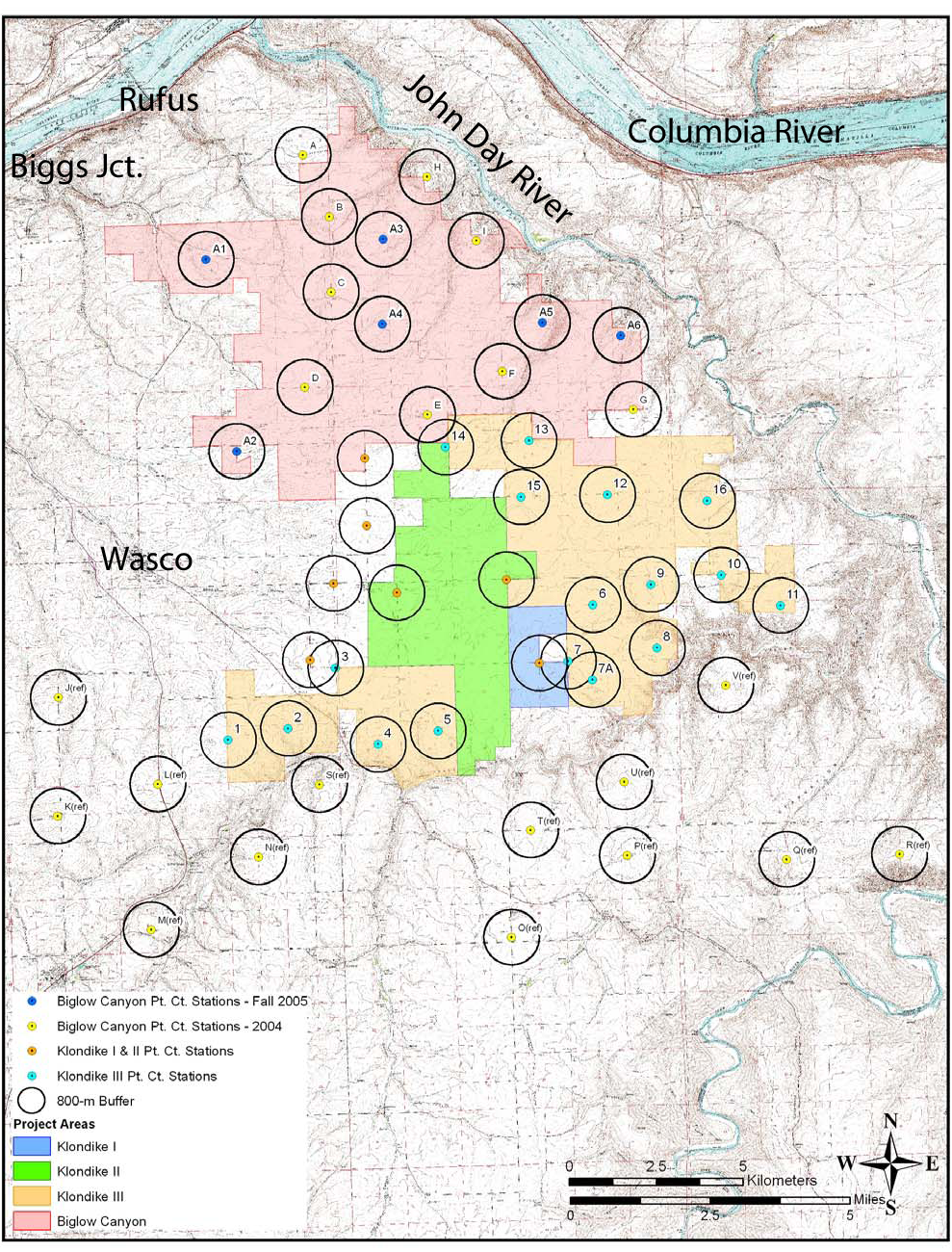
Map showing proposed wind farms in Sherman County; Biglow is in pink

Biglow Canyon Wind Farm is an electricity generating wind farm facility in Sherman County, Oregon, United States. It is owned by Portland, Oregon-based Portland General Electric and began operations in 2007. With the completion of phase 3 of the project it has a generating capacity of 450 megawatts. It is located roughly five miles (8.0 km) northeast of Wasco, Oregon, and about ten miles (16 km) southeast of Rufus, Oregon. Biglow Canyon Wind Farm covers 25,000 acres (10,000 ha) in the Columbia River Gorge.

== History ==
In 2005, Orion Energy announced plans to develop a 450-megawatt wind farm with 225 turbines at Biglow Canyon in the Columbia River Gorge, at the time the largest project of its kind in Oregon. Portland General Electric (PGE) acquired Orion's development rights to the $200 million project in 2006. In November 2006, PGE purchased the first 76 turbines for the project from Vestas, with the project cost increasing to an estimated $256 million for the first phase. PGE broke ground on the site in February 2007. In the middle of October 2007, ten Vestas V82 wind turbines were energized to produce the first electricity at Biglow. The last of the 76 turbines in the first-phase of the wind farm development became operational in December 2007.

The turbines for phases 2 and 3 were purchased from Siemens Energy. There will be 141 SWT-2.3-93 turbines, with a capacity of 2.3 MW each. Phase 2 of the project was completed in August 2009, adding 65 turbines to the wind farm. The expansion brought generating capacity to 275 megawatts. Phase 3 added 76 wind turbines, with the cost of phases two and three totaling $700 to $800 million. Phase 3 completed the project and brought the maximum generating capacity to 450 megawatts, though the anticipated generation is estimated to average 150 megawatts. The final phase was completed in September 2010, with the project totaling 217 turbines at a cost $1 billion.

On February 1, 2022, a turbine lost a blade which traveled about 100 yards before landing. This resulted in the farm being shut-down for months for inspections.

== Operations ==
The Biglow Canyon Wind Farm has an installed capacity of 450 megawatts. The site covers 25,000 acres (10,000 ha) in Sherman County. The wind farm uses a feeder transmission line from the canyon to high-voltage transmission lines via a power substation located near The Dalles. PGE does not own this line. Additionally, the line connects this and other wind farms to the Bonneville Power Administration run power grid built for use with the hydroelectric dams on the Columbia River.

== Certification ==
The facility is authorized to install up to 225 wind turbines totaling 450 MW and averaging 150 MW distributed over 25,000 acres (10,000 ha). Each turbine's supporting tower must be 265–280 feet (81–85 m) tall; combined with wind turbine blades, each unit may be 400–445 feet (122–136 m) in height. The turbines may be aligned in up to 30 corridors 500 feet (150 m) wide on private farmland leased from the appropriate landowners. The initial construction—termed phase I—provides a completed capacity of 125 MW or enough to power 34,000 homes. Phase I cost some $250 million. Energy Trust of Oregon contributed $6 million.

Turbine output is around 600 V AC and is converted to 34.5 kV by a transformer at the base of each tower. The output is gathered by a substation which combines the individual turbine contributions. Most collector cabling and associated control and monitoring fiber-optic cable (up to 99 miles) is buried 3 feet (0.91 m) underground. Exceptions are made for aerial cables to span terrain such as canyons, wetlands, and cultivated areas to protect the environment. Up to 15 miles (24 km) of aerial cabling is permitted. Bonneville Power Administration built a 12-mile 230 kV transmission line to collect the power. It has capacity for an expected additional 450 MW from two other proposed wind farms in Sherman County.

The substation may be up to 6 acres (2.4 ha) including transformers, switching equipment, maintenance shops, control room, and offices. As many as ten meteorological observation towers up to 279 ft (85 m) are allowed throughout the wind farm to collect wind resource data. Construction must be completed by June 30, 2011.

Visual impact restrictions are in force for the John Day Wildlife Refuge, John Day Wild and Scenic River, and the John Day State Scenic Waterway (from Parish Creek to Tumwater Falls). Wildlife protection must be provided for nesting bald eagles, peregrine falcons, Swainson's hawk, golden eagle, Burrowing owl, Ferruginous hawk and minimization of harm to other wildlife. Noise levels during construction and operation of the facility must not contribute more than 50 dBA at 24 identified noise sensitive sitesAmbient noise level.

== Electricity production ==
Biglow Canyon Wind Electricity Generation (MW·h)
Year	Annual MW·h
2007	11,400
2008	381,598
2009	343,833
2010	311,962
2011	486,281
2012	1,108,517
2013	1,190,817
2014	1,142,486
2015	1,045,257
2016	1,058,132
2017	894,881
2018	1,041,840
Average (2012-2018) :	1,068,847

== See also ==
- List of wind farms in the United States
- Wind power in Oregon
