= Ladd Glacier =

Glacier on Mount Hood, Oregon, United States

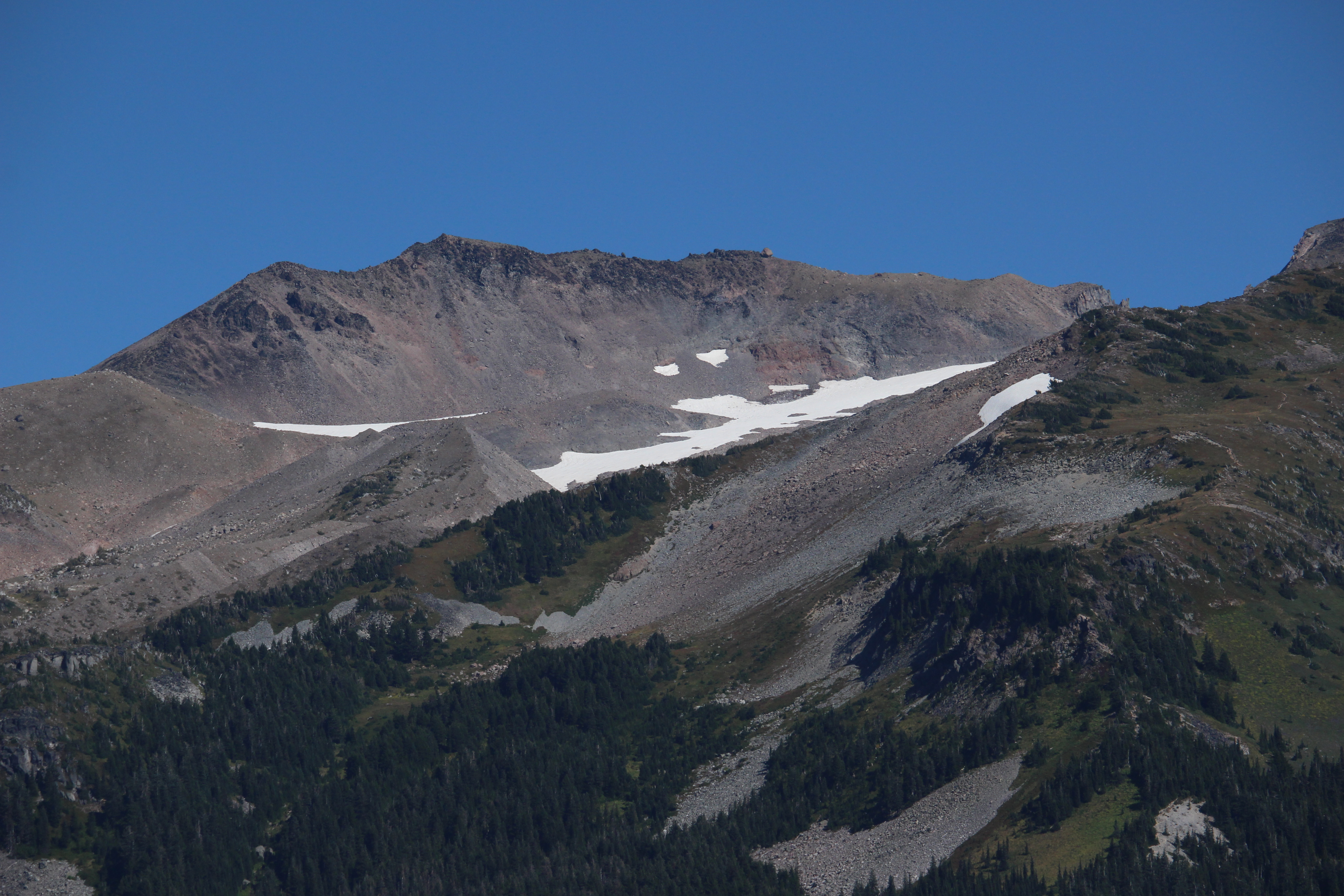
- A portion of Ladd Glacier is visible below Barrett Spur, 7,863 feet (2,397 m). Barrett Spur separates Ladd Glacier from its eastern neighbor, Coe Glacier.

- Location within Oregon
- Type: Mountain glacier
- Location: Hood River County, Oregon, United States
- Coordinates: 45°23′32″N 121°42′22″W
- Area: 165 acres (67 ha) (2004 estimate)
- Length: .75 mi (1.21 km)
- Terminus: Talus
- Status: Retreating

Ladd Glacier is an alpine glacier on the north slope of Mount Hood in the U.S. state of Oregon. It lies at an average elevation of 7,500 feet (2,300 m). The glacier lies entirely within Mount Hood Wilderness.

Between 1907 and 2004, Ladd Glacier lost 37% of its surface area and the glacier terminus retreated 1,190 metres (3,900 ft) over the same time period.

== See also ==
- List of glaciers in the United States
