= Bull Run Hydroelectric Project =

Marmot Dam and Little Sandy Dam
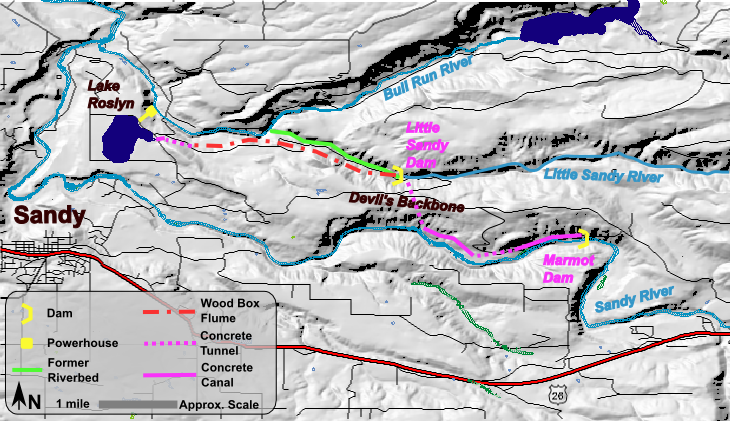
- Map of the components of the Bull Run Hydroelectric Project
- Interactive map of Marmot Dam and Little Sandy Dam
- Official name: Bull Run Hydroelectric Project
- Country: United States
- Location: Oregon
- Coordinates: 45.42901°N 122.23395°W
- Purpose: Power generation
- Status: Decommissioned
- Construction began: 1908
- Opening date: 1912
- Demolition date: 2007-2008
- Owner: Portland General Electric

Reservoir
- Creates: Roslyn Lake
- Total capacity: 928 acre-feet (1,145,000 m^{3})

Power Station
- Installed capacity: 22 MW
- Annual generation: 110,000 MW·h (400 TJ)

The Bull Run Hydroelectric Project was a Portland General Electric (PGE) development in the Sandy River basin in the U.S. state of Oregon. Originally built between 1908 and 1912 near the town of Bull Run, it supplied hydroelectric power for the Portland area for nearly a century, until it was removed in 2007 and 2008. The project used a system of canals, tunnels, wood box flumes and diversion dams to feed a remote storage reservoir and powerhouse. The entire project was removed because of rising environmental costs. Marmot Dam on the Sandy River was demolished in 2007, and the Little Sandy Dam on the Little Sandy River was taken down in 2008.

== History and overview ==
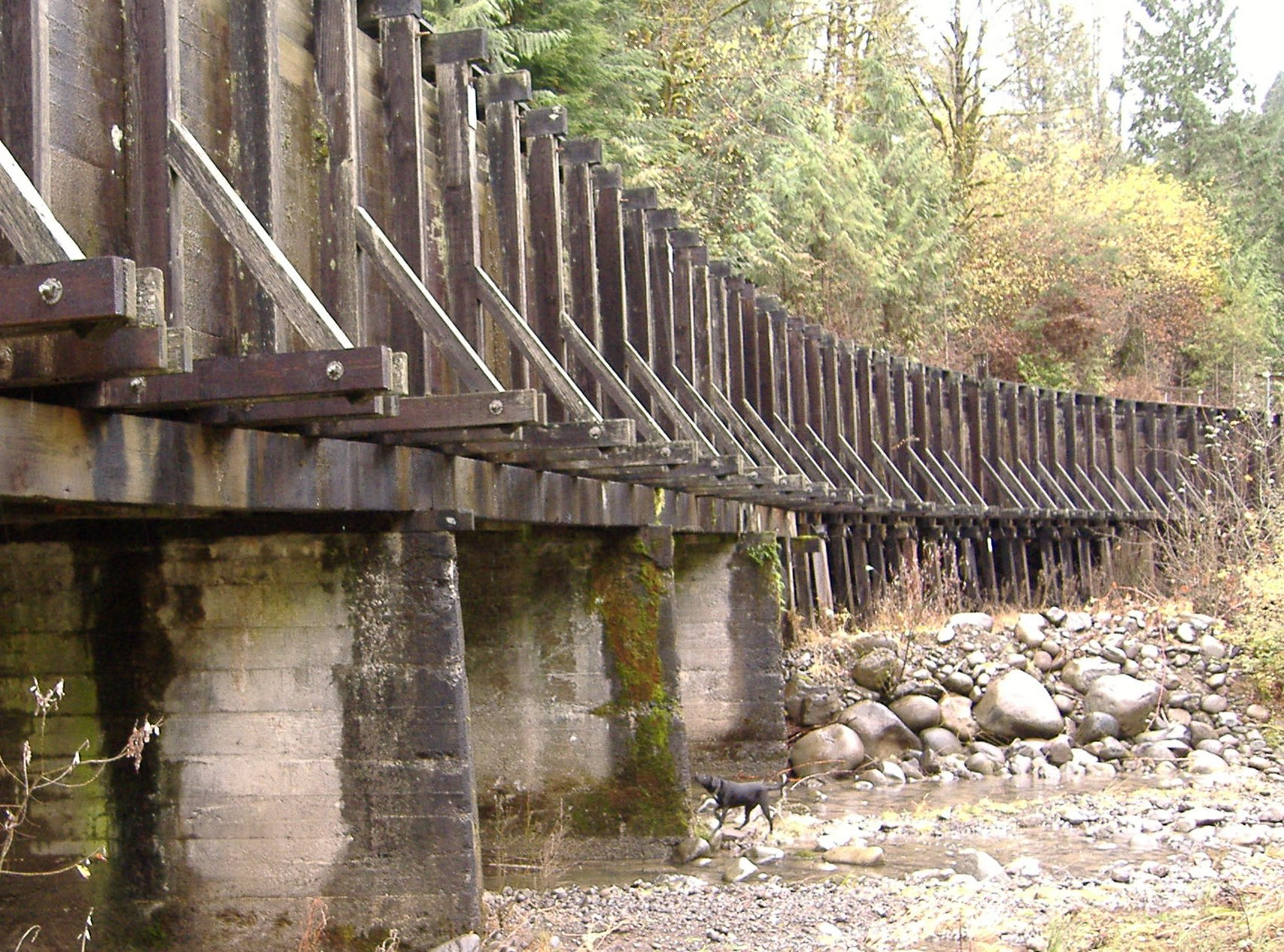
Wood box flume, after nearly 100 years of service, passing over the emptied Little Sandy riverbed. Rail tracks are mounted on the top of the flume for a maintenance trolley (note the dog at the footings for scale).

The Mount Hood Railway and Power Company (MHR&P), also known as the Mount Hood Company, began the project in 1906, building the Little Sandy Dam to divert water through a wooden flume, about 3.2 miles (5.1 km) long, to Roslyn Lake. The dam reduced streamflows on the lower 1.7 miles (2.7 km) of the Little Sandy River and blocked all salmon and steelhead access to the upper 6.5 miles (10.5 km) of the river. Roslyn Lake was at 656 feet (200 m) above sea level, about 400 feet (120 m) higher than the mouth of the Bull Run River, at 242 feet (74 m). The 140-acre (57 ha) lake acted as a reservoir for the powerhouse, which was completed and put into operation in 1912, the same year that the MHR&P merged with Portland Railway, Light and Power Company (PRL&P), the predecessor of PGE.

In 1913 PRL&P built a dam on the Sandy River to supplement the Little Sandy Dam. The Marmot Dam, 45 feet (14 m) high, diverted water from the Sandy to the Little Sandy by canal and tunnel, the longest of which ran 4,690 feet (1,430 m) under the ridge between the two rivers. The new dam supplied up to 600 cubic feet per second (17 m^{3}/s) to the Little Sandy above its diversion dam, and the Little Sandy provided up to 200 cubic feet per second (5.7 m^{3}/s), all of which could be diverted through the flume to Roslyn Lake.

The Marmot Dam included a fish ladder to allow migration of salmon and steelhead; however it performed poorly at first and required frequent upgrades and maintenance, which continued into the 1990s. To prevent fish from being swept into the diversion canal, PGE installed fish screens in 1951 and later added a bypass system to rescue fish trapped in the canal.

In 1989 the original timber crib Marmot Dam was replaced with a concrete structure.

== Operations ==
Feature	Location
Marmot Dam	45.39969°N 122.13233°W
Little Sandy Dam	45.41492°N 122.17757°W
Roslyn Lake	45.425°N 122.242°W
Bull Run Hydro powerhouse	45.42901°N 122.23395°W

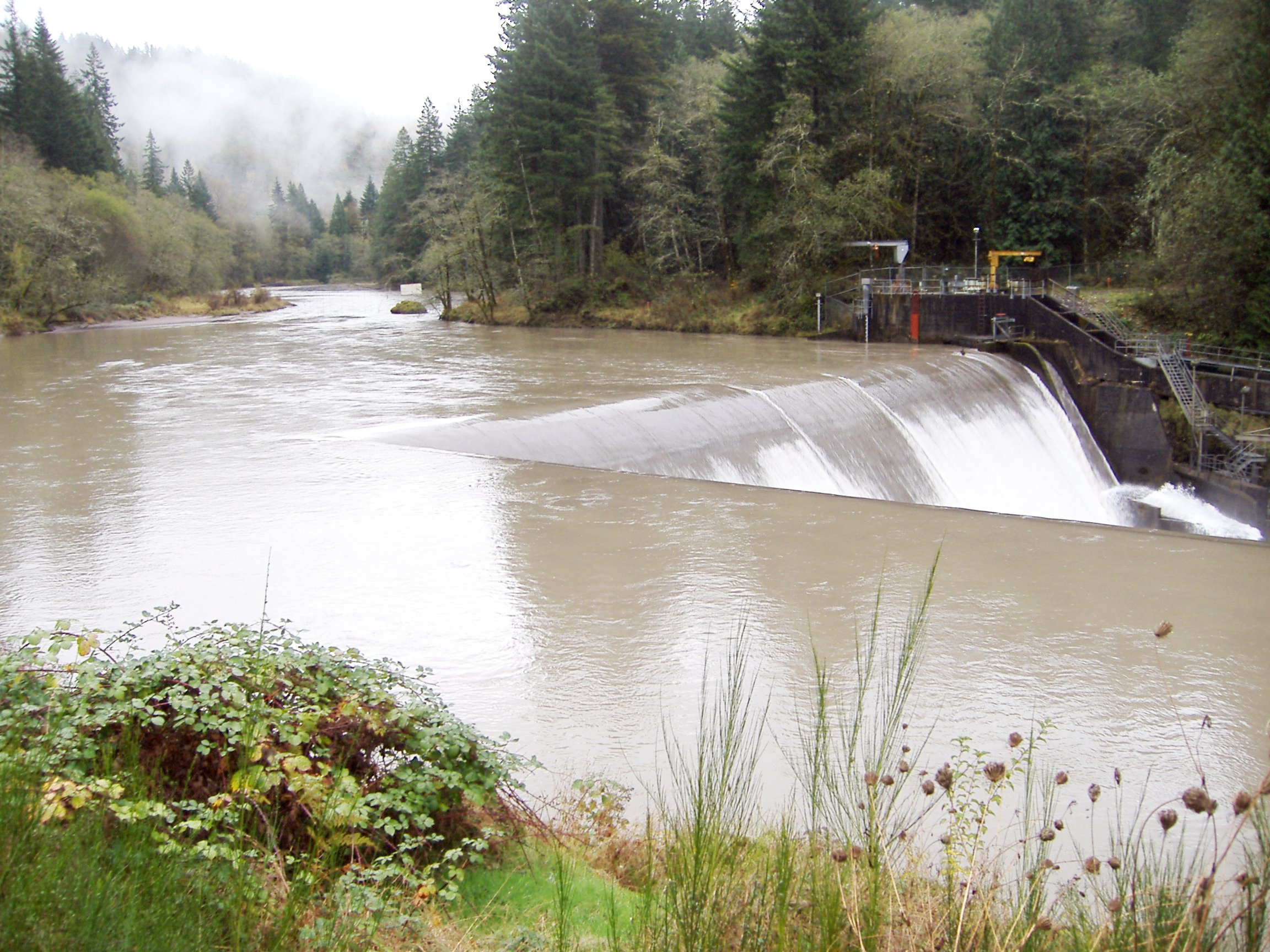
Marmot Dam. The fish ladder is visible on the far side of the dam.

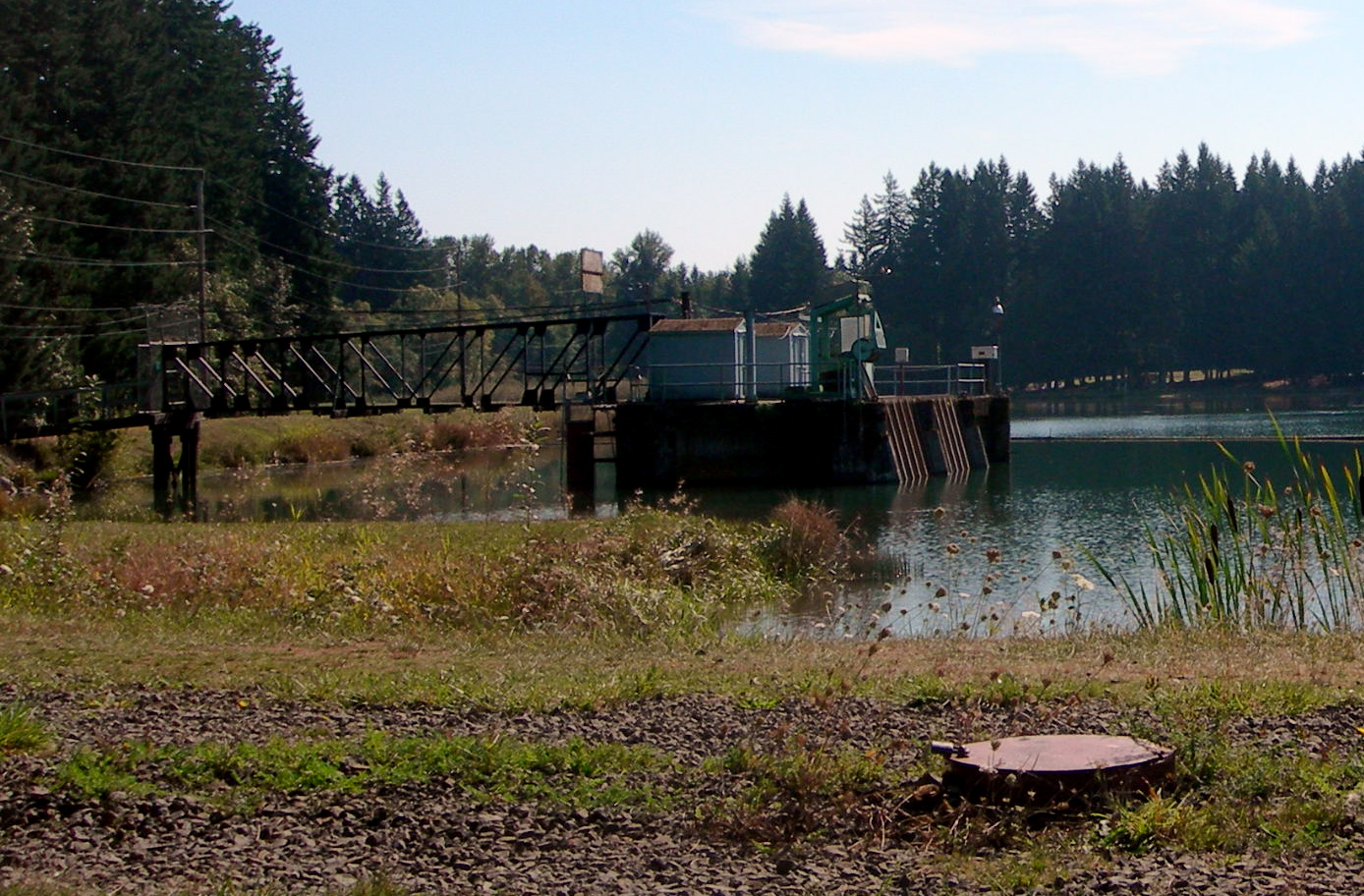
Penstock intake at Lake Roslyn

The powerhouse had a generating capacity of 22 megawatts (MW), enough to power 12,000 homes in 2007.

== Decommissioning ==
Time lapse video of Dam removal.

The decommissioning project required significant oversight, because Marmot Dam was the largest concrete dam ever removed in the United States. PGE sought and received initial approval for the project from the Federal Energy Regulatory Commission (FERC) in 1999. PGE later employed RESOLVE, a non-profit dispute resolution organization, to help develop a detailed consensus plan among the interested parties. An agreement was reached in 2002 on the decommissioning. The primary issues addressed by the reviews were the impact on fish species (particularly salmonids), their habitat, and the effect of the release of 1 million cubic yards (750,000 cubic meters) of sediment on the river course. In 2004, PGE allowed its operating license to lapse, and filed a notice stating: "[...]the likely cost of providing the necessary level of protection, mitigation, and enhancement for the resources affected by the Project would outweigh the economic benefit of generation at the Project over the life of a new license[...]" The project continued to operate with license extensions while decommissioning awaited approval. In 2006, PGE requested special approval of the decommissioning from the National Marine Fisheries Service, because of the project's potential impact on coho salmon. The final review was conducted by the United States Army Corps of Engineers, which granted approval for the decommissioning on May 21, 2007. A spokesman for the Corps stated that the removal project was unusual, because "Large dams usually don't get removed."

Before Marmot Dam could be removed, a temporary coffer dam had to be built upstream. When this phase of the project was complete, the removal of the permanent concrete dam could proceed. The destruction of the permanent dam began on 26 July 2007, when a public controlled demolition weakened the structure. The rest of the dam was destroyed using pneumatic hammers over approximately 4 months. The last concrete from Marmot Dam was removed on September 30, 2007, and the final phase of removal was completed on 20 October 2007, when the temporary earthen dam washed away and the Sandy River began to flow freely for the first time since 1912.

PGE removed Little Sandy Dam in 2008, eliminating Roslyn Lake. This restored Little Sandy River flow and made salmon and steelhead migration once again possible. In May 2009, a fish biologist reported that salmon and steelhead were spawning upstream of the former dam. PGE donated 1,500 acres (610 ha) of the dam site to the Western Rivers Conservancy. This land is planned to form the core of a 9,000-acre (3,600 ha) natural refuge and public recreation area, which will be managed by the Bureau of Land Management. PGE's water rights on the river were transferred to the state. As of 2009, PGE biologists continue to monitor the streams.

As part of its decommissioning, PGE planned to demolish the powerhouse until a private company offered to buy it. Powerhouse Re Gen LLC, a group of historic preservationists, agreed to acquire the building which is eligible for listing on the National Register of Historic Places. According to the Daily Journal of Commerce of February 2, 2010, although PGE and Re Gen had agreed on the purchase, Re Gen was required to seek approval from Clackamas County, complete an environmental study of the site, and seek approval from FERC. Re Gen, which had not announced specific plans for the site, plans to preserve it as well as other structures near Roslyn Lake.

Powerhouse ReGen (owners: Jeff Joslin, Karen Karlsson, Rick Michaelson) completed the acquisition in 2011, the property by then consisting of the powerhouse site, the historic former Bull Run elementary school, and portions of the former Roslyn Lake Recreational Area. Since the transference of ownership, restoration has commenced on various elements of the sites, but no specific repurposing has been determined.

An event commemorating the 100th anniversary of the Powerhouse and its contributions to the region was organized by Powerhouse Re Gen in 2012. The event attracted 600 visitors, including a number of long-time employees of the facility whose stories were captured by an ongoing oral history project associated with the preservation effort.

The NBC series Grimm episode, Leave It to Beavers, featured the powerhouse and associated structures. The site's transformer building served as a gathering place for giant beaver creatures. The generator hall was the site of a battle between the show's protagonist and German "Grimm Reapers", culminating with the beheading of the would-be assassin reapers.

In April 2014, the Clackamas County Board of Commissioners designated as the first Historic District within unincorporated Clackamas County the ensemble consisting of: the powerhouse site, the historic former Bull Run elementary school, and portions of the former Roslyn Lake Recreational Area.

Following a decision by the Clackamas County Board of Commissioners to approve uses for the site other than those uses no longer allowed following decommissioning, the decision was appealed to the Oregon Land Use Board of Appeals (LUBA). The decision was upheld in LUBA No 2015-022, allowing a balancing of statewide land use goals for historic preservation and high-value resource lands through the affording of such sites a precedent path for a Statewide Land Use Goal Exception. The decision established that adaptive reuse of historic structures on resource land is necessary to preserve them, and that local jurisdictions can and should strategically rezone to allow limited uses not otherwise allowed in resource zones. The decision not only supported viable approaches to preserve these specific sites, but also provided a bright line preservation path for all historic resources in Oregon Timber and Agriculture zones.

In 2016 changes in ownership occurred. The historic schoolhouse and park components of the site were conveyed to Trackers Earth, an environmental education organization. The Powerhouse was established as an independent site as a result of the aforementioned land use decision, and was conveyed to the Powerhouse Center On The Bull Run, a non-profit established to maintain and preserve the Powerhouse, and identify future potential uses related to historic preservation and environmental education and stewardship.

== Works cited ==
- Taylor, Barbara (1998). "Salmon and Steelhead Runs and Related Events of the Sandy River Basin – A Historical Perspective". Portland, Oregon: Portland General Electric Company. Retrieved January 16, 2010.
