= Elk Cove (Oregon) =

Meadow in the Mount Hood Wilderness in Oregon

Coordinates: 45.40944°N 121.69667°W

Elk Cove is a meadow in the Mount Hood Wilderness on the north side of Mount Hood in the U.S. state of Oregon. It is a popular backpacking area along the Timberline Trail.
