= Wheatridge Renewable Energy Facility =

Power generation facility, Oregon

Coordinates: 45.567°N 119.623°W

Wheatridge Renewable Energy Facility is a combined wind/solar/battery power generation facility near Lexington, Morrow County, Oregon. It is owned by Portland General Electric and NextEra Energy.

The project and a preliminary application were created in 2014, with a 500 MW capacity from up to 292 turbines. An application for the 230 kV interconnect to the Umatilla Electric Cooperative (and thus Bonneville Power Administration and the Western Interconnection) was submitted to the Federal Energy Regulatory Commission in 2017.

The wind farm, with 120 GE turbines, came online in December 2020. The turbines are 90 meters tall (to the hub), and are 2.3MW and 2.5MW units. PGE owns 100MW of capacity, and NextEra owns 200MW.

NextEra is also building 50MW of DC solar and 120MW-hours of DC battery storage on the site. These are slated for completion by the end of 2021.
