= Muddy Fork (Oregon) =

- Location of the mouth of the Muddy Fork in Oregon

Location
- Country: United States
- State: Oregon
- County: Clackamas County

Physical characteristics
- Source: Sandy Glacier on the west slope of Mount Hood
  - location: Mount Hood Wilderness, Clackamas County, Oregon
  - coordinates: 45°23′18″N 121°43′41″W
  - elevation: 5,890 ft (1,800 m)
- Mouth: Sandy River
  - location: Mount Hood National Forest, Clackamas County, Oregon
  - coordinates: 45°23′40″N 121°49′04″W
  - elevation: 2,638 ft (804 m)
- Length: 6 mi (9.7 km)

Muddy Fork is a tributary, about 6 miles (10 km) long, of the Sandy River in the U.S. state of Oregon. Arising at the base of Sandy Glacier on the west slope of Mount Hood, it flows west through the Mount Hood Wilderness in the Mount Hood National Forest. It joins the Sandy River in Old Maid Flat, about 5 miles (8 km) northeast of Rhododendron. The stream offers limited fishing for coastal cutthroat trout.

== Course ==
Muddy Fork begins at 5,890 feet (1,800 m) above sea level at the foot of Sandy Glacier in the Mount Hood Wilderness of the Cascade Range. Its entire course lies within the Mount Hood National Forest and Clackamas County. Falling 3,252 feet (991 m) between source and mouth, the stream's average loss of elevation is about 500 feet per mile (95 m/km).

Flowing generally west from the glacier, it passes south of McNeil Point, which is on the stream's right. It then flows between Yocum Ridge, which is to the left, and Bald Mountain to the right before being crossed by the Pacific Crest Trail near the eastern end of Old Maid Flat. The Sandy River enters Old Maid Flat to the left of Muddy Fork, and the two run roughly parallel across the flat until joining near Last Chance Mountain, which is on the right. The confluence is upstream of Fred McNeil Campground and Lolo Pass Road (Forest Road 18). Muddy Fork has no named tributaries.

== Fishing ==
Although Muddy Fork is closed to salmon fishing, the stream has wild cutthroat trout "of fair size". The stream is open to catch and release fishing for cutthroat but only with artificial flies and lures. Conditions are generally best in spring before seasonal runoffs of glacial silt.

== See also ==
- List of rivers of Oregon
