= Oxbow Regional Park =

Regional park in Oregon, United States

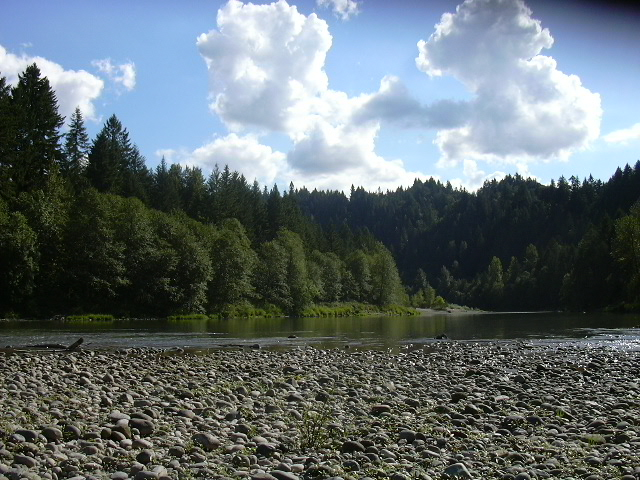
- Sandy River in Oxbow Park during summer
- Interactive map of Oxbow Regional Park
- Type: Regional park
- Location: near Springdale, Multnomah County, Oregon
- Coordinates: 45.4951206°N 122.2881457°W
- Area: 1,000 acres (400 ha)
- Operator: Metro regional government

Oxbow Regional Park is a 1,000-acre (4.0 km^{2}) natural area park located ten miles (16 km) southeast of Troutdale along the Sandy River in the U.S. state of Oregon. Owned and operated by Metro regional government, it hosts a yearly festival celebrating salmon.

== Recreation ==
The park offers a wide variety of activities, including swimming, boating, fishing, horseback riding, and hiking. Fifteen miles of hiking trails lead through an ancient forest with centuries-old trees and ridges and ravines carved by volcanic and glacial flows. Metro, the park's managing body, leads ancient forest walks, animal tracking workshops, and wildflower and mushroom identification classes. Year-round camping is available in the park's 67-site developed campground.

Oxbow also offers opportunities to see wildlife and animal tracks. The area's natural habitat makes an ideal home for wildlife such as mink, beaver, raccoon, fox, deer, osprey, elk, black bear, and cougar. In order to avoid confrontation with wildlife, pets are not allowed in the park.

== Salmon Festival ==
Oxbow Regional Park used to host the annual Salmon Festival, celebrating the return of the Chinook salmon while educating the public about the importance of intact, functional aquatic ecosystems, protection of native salmon and their habitat, and how fully functioning aquatic ecosystems can have a positive and important influence on human quality of life. One of the longest running and most recognized salmon festivals on the West Coast, the Oxbow Salmon Festival has evolved into a popular conservation educational event. The two-day event draws up to 10,000 visitors who can see spawning salmon; enjoy music, food, art, storytelling, and a fish maze; and encounter a variety of traditional activities and cultural exhibits at Wy-Kan-Ush-Pum village hosted by the fishing tribes of the Columbia Basin, including the Nez Perce, Umatilla, Yakama, and Warm Springs tribes.

== See also ==
- Blue Lake Regional Park
- Cooper Mountain Nature Park
