= Dabney State Recreation Area =

State park in the U.S. state of Oregon

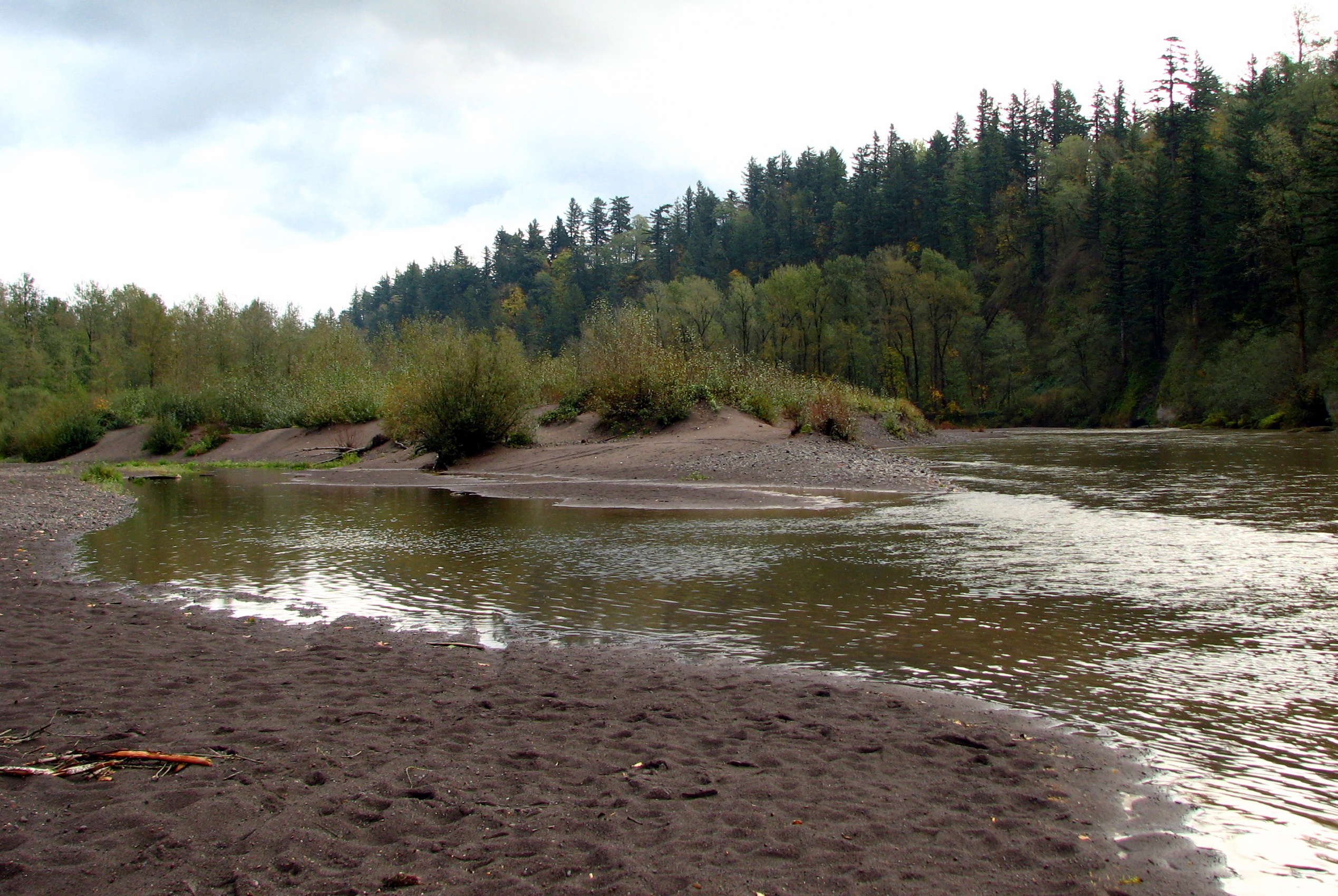
- The Sandy River at Dabney SRA.

- Location within Oregon Location within the United States
- Interactive map of Dabney State Recreation Area
- Type: Public, state
- Location: Multnomah County, Oregon
- Nearest city: Troutdale
- Coordinates: 45°31′02″N 122°21′12″W
- Operator: Oregon Parks and Recreation Department

Dabney State Recreation Area is a park on the Sandy River in the U.S. state of Oregon. Located in Multnomah County outside the city of Troutdale, the park offers swimming, boating, disc golf, and other activities.

== See also ==
- List of Oregon state parks
