= Mount Hood Wilderness =

Protected area

- IUCN category Ib (wilderness area)
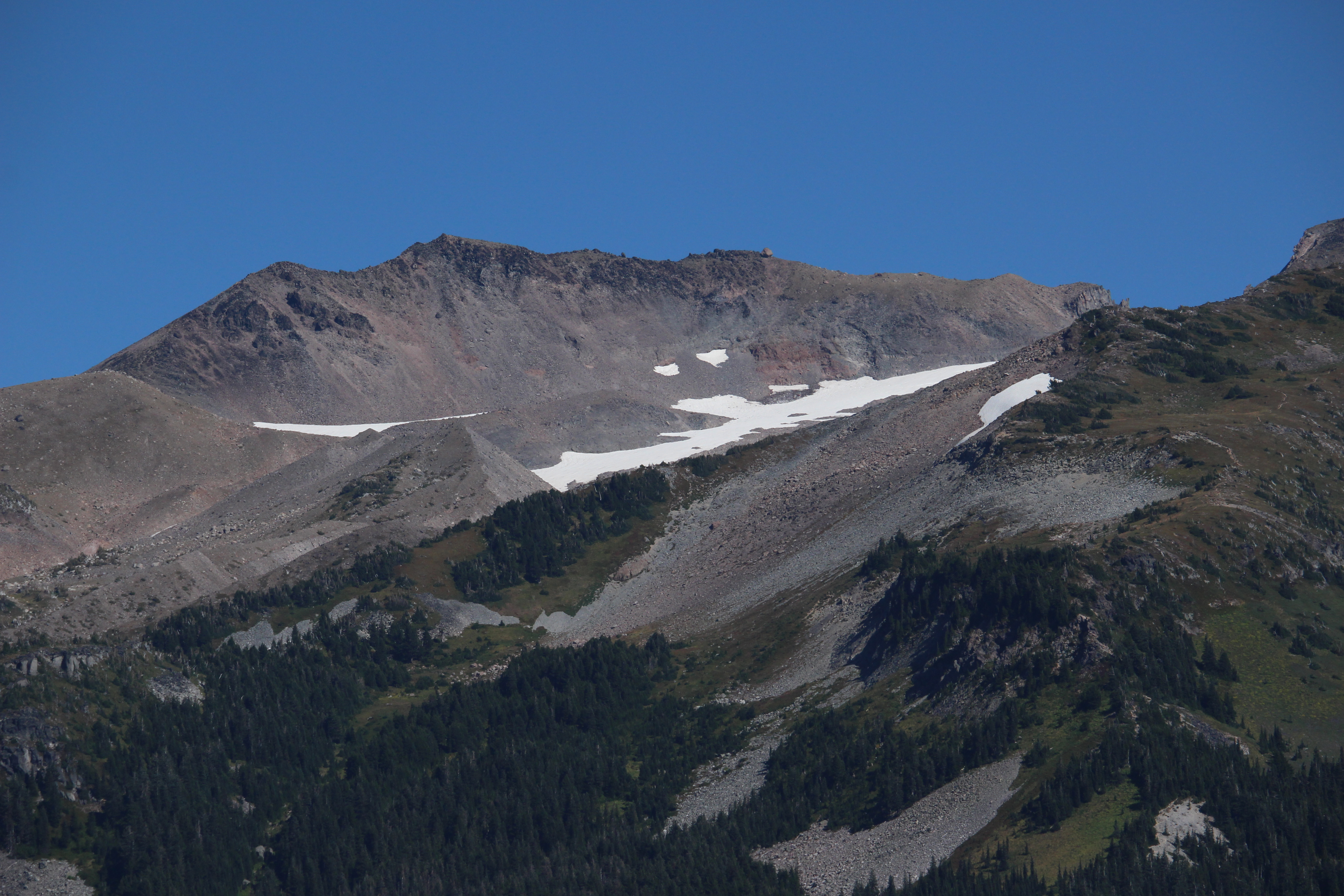
- On the northern flank of Mount Hood, Barrett Spur, 7,863 feet (2,397 m), divides Ladd Glacier (center) from its eastern neighbor, Coe Glacier.
- Interactive map of Mount Hood Wilderness
- Location: Clackamas / Hood River counties, Oregon, USA
- Nearest city: Government Camp, Oregon
- Coordinates: 45°23′N 121°45′W
- Area: 64,742 acres (262.00 km^{2})
- Established: 1964
- Governing body: U.S. Forest Service

The Mount Hood Wilderness is a protected wilderness area inside the Mount Hood National Forest, in the U.S. state of Oregon. The area, covering 64,742 acres (26,200 ha), includes the peak of Mount Hood and its upper slopes, and ranges from temperate rain forests at the lower elevations, to glaciers and rocky ridges at higher elevations.

The wilderness wraps around the mountain from west to northeast, and borders Timberline Lodge and Mount Hood Meadows ski lifts on some of the south and east slopes of the mountain.

== Trails ==
Journeys to the summit are popular. There are opportunities for experienced and novice mountaineers to traverse glaciers, snowfields and steep volcanic soil, and to deal with rapidly changing and difficult to predict weather. More than 10,000 climbers annually make the attempt, making Mount Hood's summit the most visited snowclad peak in America.

Numerous trails circle the mountain, from Lolo Pass on the northwest (which the Pacific Crest Trail crosses) to Cloud Cap on the northeast to the ski areas on the south. There are several historic structures (predating the wilderness designation), one of which is the remains of a stone lodge near Cairn Basin on the northwest side. Numerous pristine areas are easily accessible, such as Elk Cove on the north side of the mountain near the tree line.

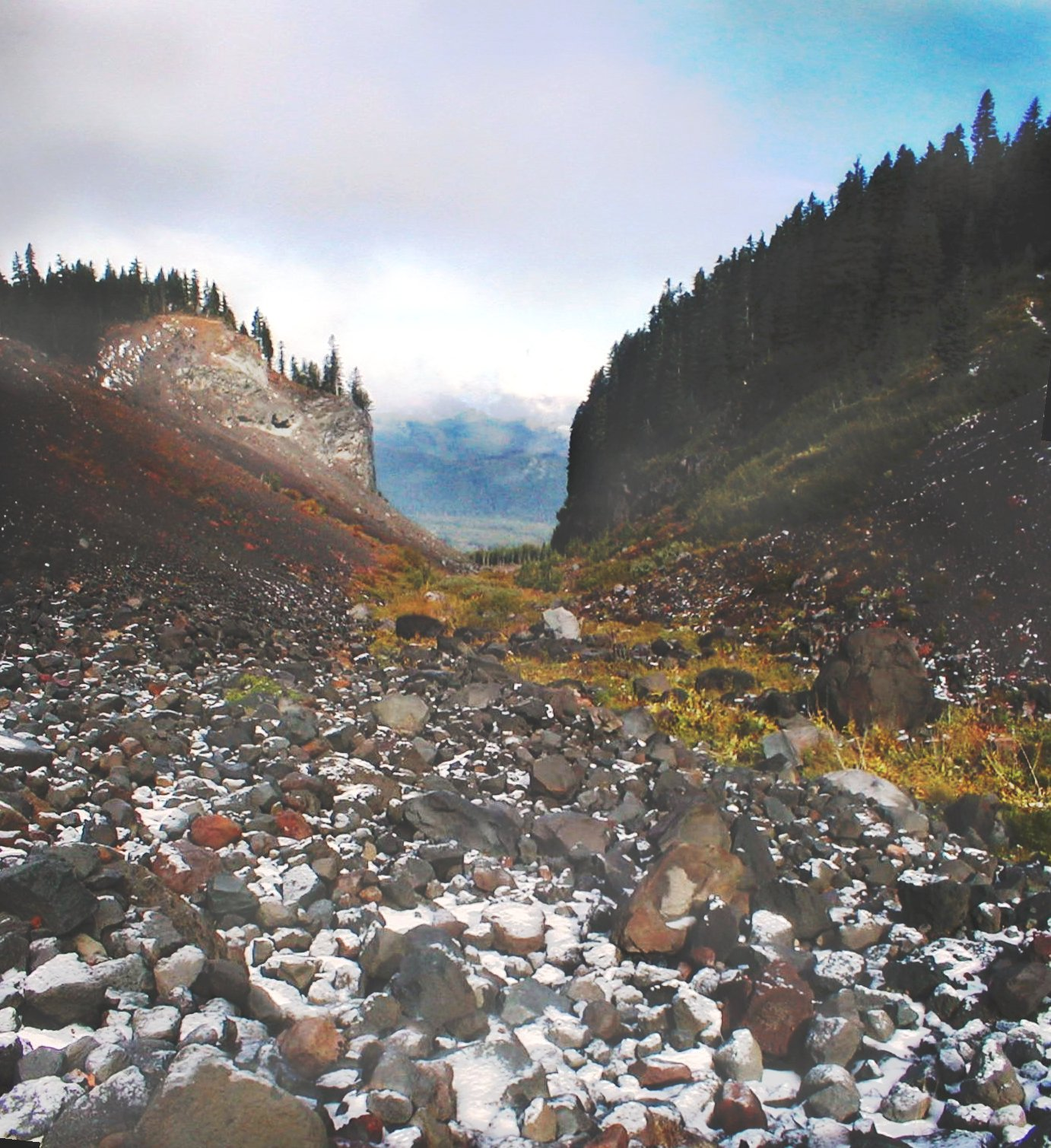
U-shaped valley on the west flank of Mount Hood

The best known trail is the forty-one mile Timberline Trail, Forest Service trail #600, which circles the mountain. It shares eleven miles with the Pacific Crest Trail and alternates above and below the timberline. The trail is rerouted periodically due to washouts and to avoid sensitive high altitude and alpine meadows. It has a handful of informal campsites for backpackers, although camping is permitted anywhere outside the meadows and at least 200 feet (61 m) from water bodies. There are several hazardous stream crossings, especially on the west side and at the landslide-prone Eliot Branch near Cloud Cap, which closed the trail there in 2007. The trail has several significant vertical ascents and descents totaling 9,000 feet (2,700 m), mostly at canyon crossings. Elevation of the trail varies from 3,250 feet (990 m) (half a mile west of dramatic Ramona Falls on the west side) to 7,300 feet (2,200 m) on the east side. The trail is accessible from Timberline Lodge, which has free parking for backpackers, and numerous connecting trails.

== Restrictions ==
Wilderness permits are required, but free, to enter the area and can be filled out at ranger stations or at kiosks along trails where they enter the wilderness. Climbers ascending to or near the summit are required to register (and sign out at return) in Timberline's day lodge, or at other wilderness permit registration kiosks. Mountain Locator Units can be rented in Government Camp and at some area recreation businesses.

U.S. Wilderness Areas do not allow vehicles, including bicycles. Although camping and fishing are allowed with proper permit, no roads or buildings are constructed and there is also no logging or mining, in compliance with the 1964 Wilderness Act. Wilderness areas within National Forests and Bureau of Land Management areas do allow hunting in season.

== See also ==
- Mount Hood climbing accidents
- List of U.S. Wilderness Areas
- Wilderness Act
