= Orion Energy Systems =

Orion Energy Systems, Inc.
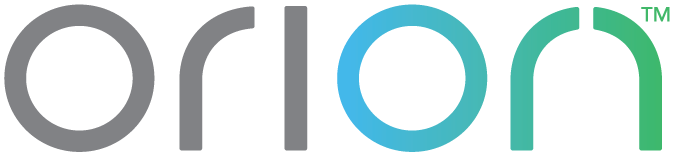
- Company type: Public
- Traded as: Nasdaq: OESX
- Industry: Lighting, Energy services
- Founded: Plymouth, Wisconsin
- Founder: Neal Verfuerth and Patrick Trotter
- Headquarters: Manitowoc, Wisconsin
- Area served: Worldwide
- Key people: Mike Jenkins(CEO)
- Website: oesx.com

Orion Energy Systems, Inc. is an American LED lighting and intelligent controls enterprise, founded in Plymouth, Wisconsin, and headquartered in Manitowoc, Wisconsin

== History ==
Orion Energy Systems Inc. was founded in 1996 and is headquartered in Manitowoc, Wisconsin. Its initial public offering (IPO) occurred on December 18, 2007.

In March 2009 President Barack Obama highlighted the company's lighting systems in a policy speech about new energy technology and "green collar" jobs. and on January 26, 2011, visited the company.
