= Muddy Fork (North Fork Salt River tributary) =

Stream in Knox County, Missouri, U.S.

Coordinates: 40.023649°N 92.311297°W

Muddy Fork is a stream in Knox County in the U.S. state of Missouri. It is a tributary of the North Fork Salt River.

Muddy Fork was so named on account of the character of the water.

== See also ==
- List of rivers of Missouri
