= Portland General Electric =

Public utility based in Portland, Oregon

Portland General Electric Company
- Type: Public company
- Traded as: NYSE: POR; S&P 400 component
- Industry: Public utility
- Founded: 1888; 138 years ago
- Headquarters: Portland, Oregon, U.S.
- Products: Electric power
- Revenue: US$2.9 billion (2023)
- Operating income: US$396M (2023)
- Net income: US$228M (2023)
- Total assets: ▲US$11.2 billion (2023)
- Total equity: ▲US$3.3 billion (2023)
- Number of employees: 2,840 (2023)
- Website: portlandgeneral.com

Portland General Electric (PGE) is a Fortune 1000, publicly traded energy company based in Portland, Oregon, that generates, transmits and distributes electricity, serving almost two-thirds of Oregon's commercial and industrial activity. PGE is regulated by the Oregon Public Utility Commission. Founded in 1888 as the Willamette Falls Electric Company, the company has been an independent company for most of its existence, though was briefly owned by the Houston-based Enron Corporation from 1997 until 2006, when Enron divested itself of PGE during its bankruptcy.

Notably, PGE does not serve all of Portland. Its service territory comprises most of Portland west of the Willamette River, sharing most of the city east of the river with Pacific Power.

PGE holds a mix of generation and storage facilities including hydropower, wind, solar, battery storage and thermal, as well as key transmission resources. The company's power plants have a combined generating capacity of more than 3,300 megawatts.

Following the Oregon House Bill 2021, which introduced new decarbonization goals, PGE announced to reduce emissions from its retail power supply by 80% by 2030 and 100% by 2040. As of 2025, a minority (45%) of PGE's electricity comes from non carbon emitting sources and the largest source of generation is natural gas.

== History ==
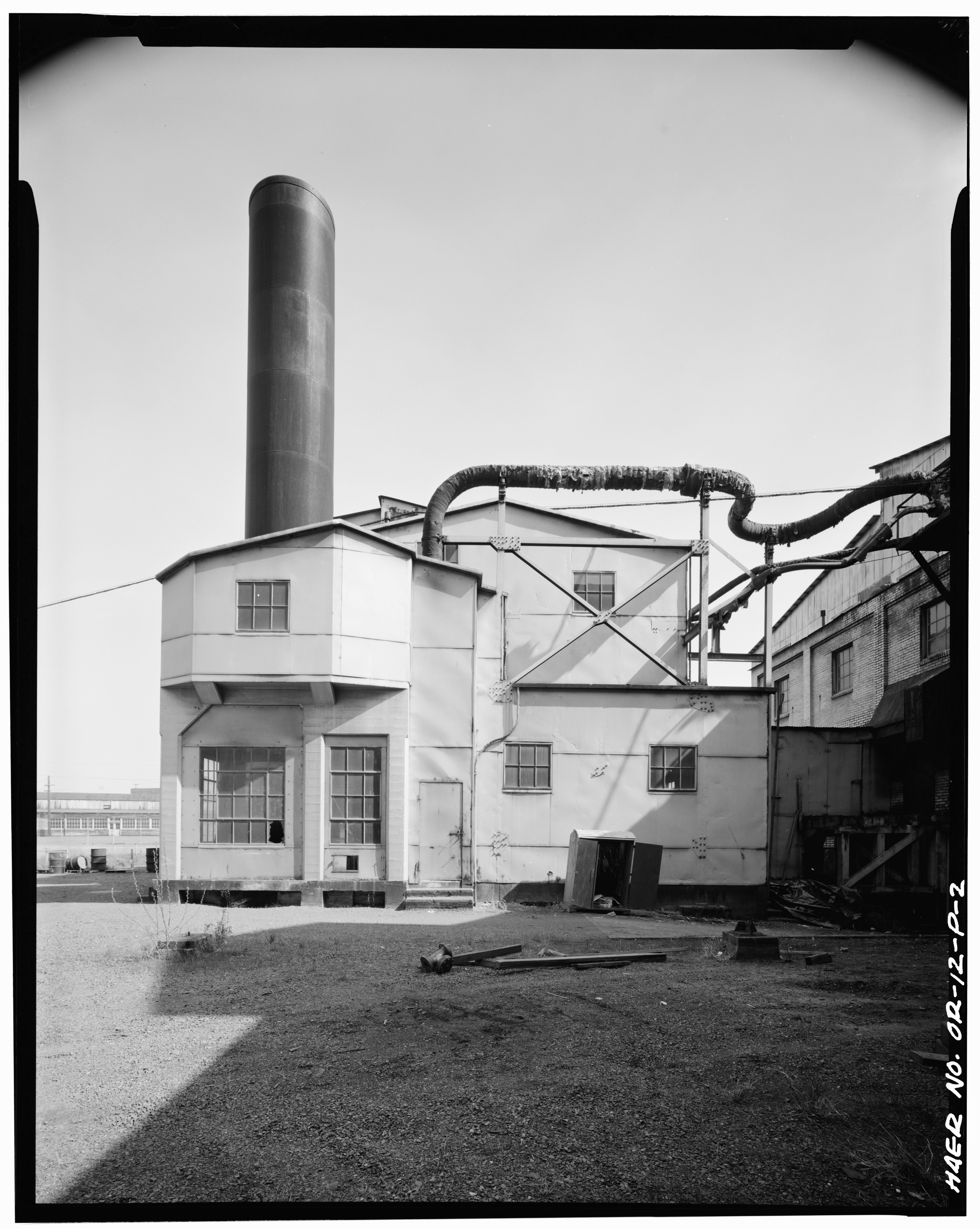
PGE Boiler #16 in 1988

The utility was founded in 1888 by Parker F. Morey and Edward L. Eastham as Willamette Falls Electric Company. On June 3, 1889, it sent power generated by one of four brush arc light dynamos at Willamette Falls over a 14-mile (23 km) electric power transmission line to Portland, the first US power plant to do so. On August 6, 1892, Morey, Frederick Van Voorhies Holman, and Henry Failing formed the Portland General Electric Company. It was funded by General Electric and the investment arm of Old Colony Trust, with $4.25 million in capital. The newly formed PGE Company purchased Willamette Falls Electric and the Albina Light & Water Company in 1892.

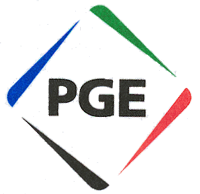
Previous logo

Less than a year later, in May 1893, PGE purchased the City-Eastside Electric Light Plant, a municipal power company. E. Kimbark MacColl, who chronicled the history of Portland, referred to it "a generous gift to a private company at the expense of future taxpayers" since it was constructed for a cost of $40,342 and sold 15 months later for $27,000.

In 1903, Henry W. Goode, the president of PGE, decided to make PGE a "popular public utility." His vision was for the company to light the Lewis and Clark Centennial Exposition in 1905. in 1903, he traveled to the east coast to raise $3,000 from shareholders. His plan went through, and Thomas H. Wright was put in charge of designing the lighting for the fair.

PGE also purchased the Union Power Company in 1905, and the Vancouver Electric Light & Power Company in 1906. In 1906, PGE, Portland Railway Company, and Oregon Water Power & Railway Company merged, becoming the Portland Railway, Light and Power Company (PRL&P). It was the only streetcar operator within Portland city limits, and the predecessor of the modern PGE.

The company name became Portland Electric Power Company (PEPCO) in 1932. It was reorganized in 1948 as PGE.

On March 1, 1939, PEPCO defaulted on interest bonds that had been issued in March 1934. The bonds were pledged with PGE (the electric subsidiary) and Portland Traction Company (the streetcar subsidiary) as collateral, with Guaranty Trust as trustee. PEPCO filed for Chapter X bankruptcy (now known as Chapter 9) on April 3, 1939, and was assigned District Judge James Alger Fee. The proceedings were later called "one of the most prolonged and complicated series of legal proceedings in Portland's history".

The reorganization and bond default was brought on by PGE's difficult negotiations with Bonneville Power Administration, the death of Seattle City Light's visionary J. D. Ross, and the indecision created by the possible creation of a public utility district in PGE's territory. The Columbia Valley Authority project would have allowed CVA to purchase utilities such as PGE.

PGE survived bankruptcy partially through cheap power purchases from BPA beginning in the fall of 1939, and by the end of 1941 they showed net profits. In the meantime, Ormond R. Bean, the Oregon Public Utility Commissioner, forced PGE to lower its rates. Ultimately, PEPCO and PGE were saved by World War II, which led to the construction of three Kaiser Shipyards and of Vanport City, Oregon to support them. By 1945, PGE derived nearly $400,000 in revenue from the two Kaiser shipyards in Oregon. In August 1946, after the war, they were able to sell Portland Traction for $8 million in cash. Judge Fee ruled the bankruptcy reorganization complete on June 29, 1946.

On July 1, 1997, Enron Corporation bought PGE for $2 billion in stock and $1.1 billion in assumed debt. Then in 1999, and again in 2001, Enron attempted to sell PGE to other investor-owned utilities including Portland-based NW Natural. The corporate officers of PGE claimed that this utility was not involved in the financial mis-dealings of its owner, pointing to the fact that many of its employees suffered when Enron froze the 401(k) retirement plan and were unable to sell the rapidly declining stock. However, Ken Harrison and Joseph Hirko, PGE's CEO and CFO respectively at the time of the Enron merger were charged on several felony level counts primarily related to financial misrepresentation regarding Enron Broadband Services which had its headquarters within the World Trade Center complex that comprises PGE's corporate offices. In addition Timothy Belden, head of the West Coast Trading Desk and John Forney, an energy trader who invented various electricity trading strategies such as the Death Star, operated from the trading floor in the PGE corporate offices and were also convicted of financial crimes related to the California Electricity Crisis.

=== Early attempts to convert the company to a public utility district ===
Ballot measures have been filed by citizens several times since the 1960s to convert some or all of PGE into a public utility district (PUD), the latest of these being in 2003. Most were unsuccessful, but an exception was in 1999, when PGE announced it was selling its customer base in St. Helens, Scappoose, and Columbia City to West Oregon Electric PUD for $7.9 million. The terms of this sale proposed to leave the physical assets of the distribution system —the poles, wires and other components— owned by Enron, who would then manage this system as a contractor exempt from state regulation. Voter distrust of both Enron and PGE was severe enough for voters to approve the measure, despite $71,592 being spent in advertisements to oppose it, in comparison to the $2,304 spent by supporters. This resulted in those three cities becoming part of the Columbia River PUD on terms far more favorable to the customers; electricity rates immediately dropped in these cities, and remain lower than those for current PGE customers.

=== Attempted acquisition by Texas Pacific Group ===
Concerned by uncertainty that the Enron bankruptcy would bring, several local governments began investigation into acquiring PGE by condemnation. These studies ended after the announcement on November 17, 2003, that a group called Oregon Electric Utility, led by former governor Neil Goldschmidt and backed by Texas Pacific Group, offered to buy PGE for $2.35 billion. This was the sole bid received by the bankruptcy judge, who approved the bid. When details that Goldschmidt had sexually assaulted a minor in the 1970s emerged, he withdrew from the negotiations, and was replaced by Peter O. Kohler, president of the Oregon Health and Science University.

Discomfort over the Texas Pacific purchase led to further voter initiatives to convert parts of PGE into PUDs. PGE defeated measures in Multnomah County (November 14, 2003), Yamhill County (March 2004), and Clackamas County (May 18, 2004). Also during this time period, PGE received notice of a strike by 900 union workers, effective March 8, 2004, represented by the International Brotherhood of Electrical Workers. Points over which the negotiations broke down included retiree medical benefits as well as losses of the members' 401(k) plan. This labor dispute was resolved shortly afterward, and the union agreed to a new contract.

The TPG purchase offer was denied by the Oregon Public Utility Commission, a three-member regulatory board, on March 10, 2005. With the rejection of the Texas Pacific Group's offer, the City of Portland announced it contacted Enron to resume negotiating an offer to purchase PGE. On April 19, 2005, Portland city officials announced that they were willing to spend $7.5 million in attorneys' fees to buy the utility. On July 6, the City Council unanimously adopted a measure to finance the acquisition of PGE by the sale of $3 billion in bonds.

However, Enron interim CEO Stephen Cooper called off negotiations on July 20, 2005. He explained that he did not "see a plausible solution under which our teams could reach an agreement that would lead to a transaction closing in a timely fashion". Cooper addressed several causes for the termination, including the refusal of the city to pay a $50 million deposit on the sale. The same day, Governor Ted Kulongoski vetoed a bill that would create a public corporation to purchase PGE.

=== Independence from Enron ===
In April 2006, shares in a newly independent PGE were issued as part of an Enron distribution to its creditors.

== Power plants ==
Source for section:

=== Thermal power plants ===
- Beaver Generating Plant – 511 MWe – a combined cycle cogeneration plant located in Clatskanie, Oregon. PGE's Beaver Generating Facility, located in Clatskanie Oregon, is a natural gas fired combined cycle power plant that includes six identical sets of GE Model MS 7001B combustion turbine (GTs) and Heat Recovery Steam Generators (HRSGs), and one Steam Turbine Generator (STG) configured in a 6x1 arrangement.
- Port Westward High Efficiency Gas Power Plant 1 & 2 – 393 & 214 MWe capacity. Located next to Beaver Generating Plant.
- Carty Generating Plant – 436 MWe – located next to the former Boardman Coal Plant.
- Coyote Springs Generating Plant – 257 MWe – located in Boardman, Oregon; began operating in 1995. Coyote Springs is a combined cycle cogeneration plant.
- Colstrip Power Plant 3 & 4 – 296 MWe – located in Colstrip, Montana.

=== Hydroelectric plants ===
- Faraday (Clackamas River) – 46 MWe
- North Fork (Clackamas River) – 58 MWe
- Oak Grove (Clackamas River) – 43 MWe
- River Mill Hydroelectric Project (Clackamas River) – 25 MWe
- T. W. Sullivan Hydroelectric Plant (Willamette River) – 18 MWe
- Pelton Dam (Deschutes River) – 57 MWe
- Round Butte Dam (Deschutes River) – 187 MWe
- Bull Run (Sandy and Little Sandy rivers) – 22 MWe (decommissioned, 2007)

=== Renewable sources ===
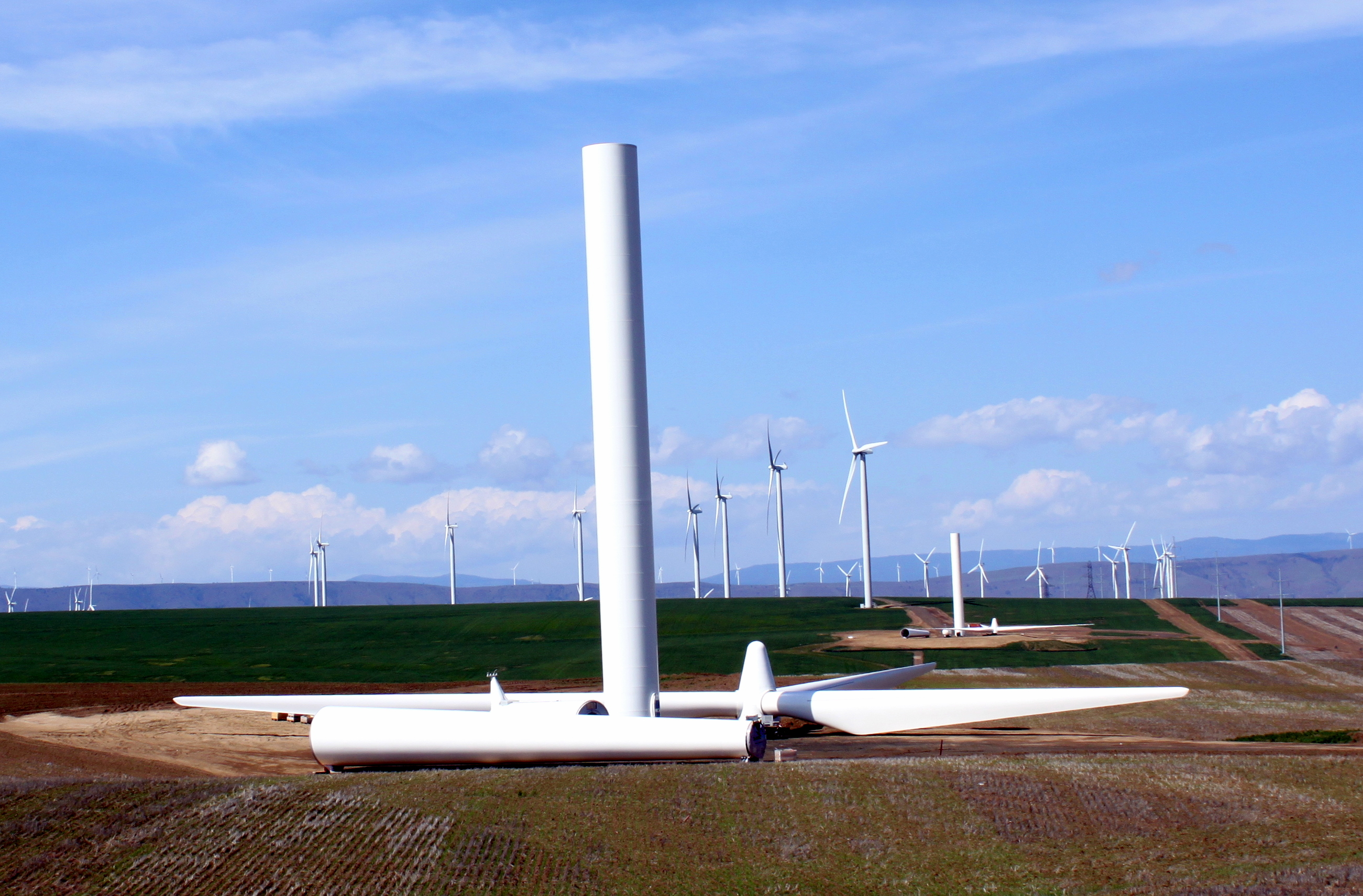
Part of the Biglow Canyon Wind Farm, with a turbine under construction

- Biglow Canyon Wind Farm – generating capacity of 450 MWe
- Tucannon River Wind Farm – generating capacity of 267 MWe
- Marion County Waste-to-Energy Facility – 13 MWe from municipal garbage incineration.
- Clearwater Wind Farm - generating capacity of 311 MWe
- Wheatridge Renewable Energy Facility - generating capacity of 380 MWe – 300 MWe wind, 50 MWe solar facility and 30 MWe battery storage system.

=== Decommissioned facilities ===
- Boardman Generating Plant (coal) – 601 MWe – located in Boardman, Oregon. Closed on October 15, 2020.
- Bull Run Hydroelectric Plant (Sandy and Little Sandy rivers) - 22 MWe – located in Bull Run, Oregon. Closed on May 21, 2007.
- Trojan Nuclear Plant – 1130 MWe – located in Rainier, Oregon. Closed on November 9, 1992.

== Renewable energy sales ==
PGE has been ranked first for 14 years by the U.S. Department of Energy's National Renewable Energy Laboratory for the largest participation in a renewables program among electric utilities in the U.S.

== Corporate officers ==
PGE currently has 8 corporate officers.

== See also ==
- List of companies based in Oregon
