= Bull Run, Oregon =

Unincorporated community in Clackamas County, Oregon, United States

- Unincorporated community
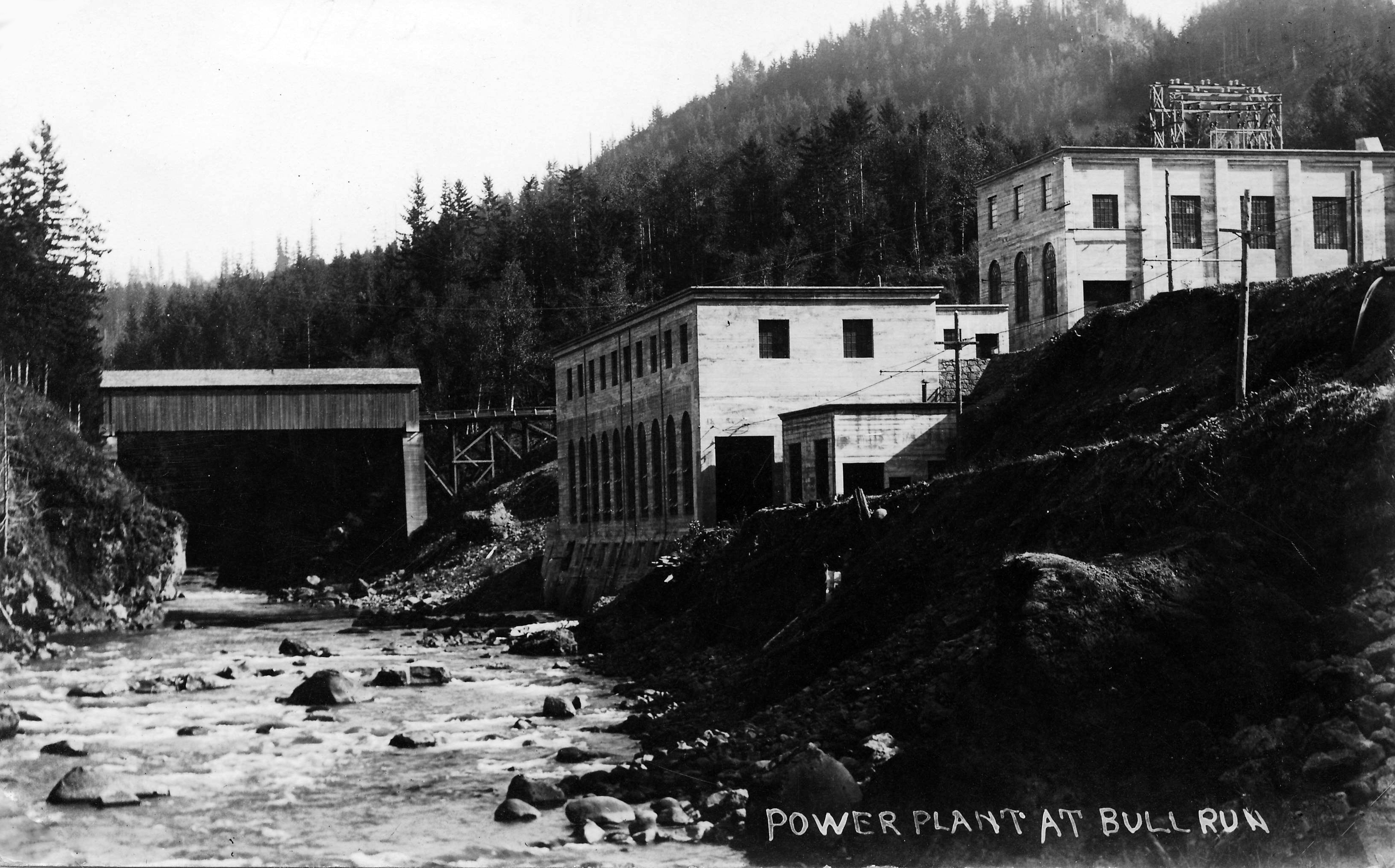
- Bull Run Power Plant c. early 1900s

- Location within Oregon
- Coordinates: 45°25′49″N 122°13′54″W
- Country: United States
- State: Oregon
- County: Clackamas
- Elevation: 456 ft (139 m)
- Time zone: UTC-8 (Pacific (PST))
  - Summer (DST): UTC-7 (PDT)
- ZIP code: 97055
- GNIS feature ID: 1134659

Bull Run is an unincorporated community in Clackamas County, Oregon, United States. It is located about 5 miles (8.0 km) northeast of Sandy, near the Bull Run River and the powerhouse of the defunct Mount Hood Railway and Power Company (later the Bull Run Hydroelectric Project).

== History ==
George H. Himes believed the name "Bull Run" may have been because of the presence of wild cattle along the river in the pioneer era of 1849–55. This story is corroborated by settler Charles B. Talbot, who said that cattle would escape from the early immigrants to the area and ran wild for several years, and so they named the area Bull Run. A 1920s story in the Gresham Outlook states that in the 1860s, a man named Frank Mognet was living in the Cedar Creek area near Sandy. He was attempting to catch a bull that had gone wild when it ran into the then-unnamed stream. Because this was just after the Battle of Bull Run, and the bull had given him a "strong run", he immediately named the stream Bull Run.

The first post office in the area, established in 1893, was named Unavilla. It is unknown why that name was chosen. The name of the post office was changed Bullrun in 1895, and to Camp Namanu in 1939. The summer-only Camp Namanu post office closed in 1953.

In 1915, Bull Run had a population of 100, a public school and a large gladiolus farm. The community was the eastern terminus of the Mt. Hood division of the Portland Railway, Light and Power Company interurban railroad. In 1940, Bull Run had a population of 35.
