= Lolo Pass (Oregon) =

Mountain pass in Oregon, United States

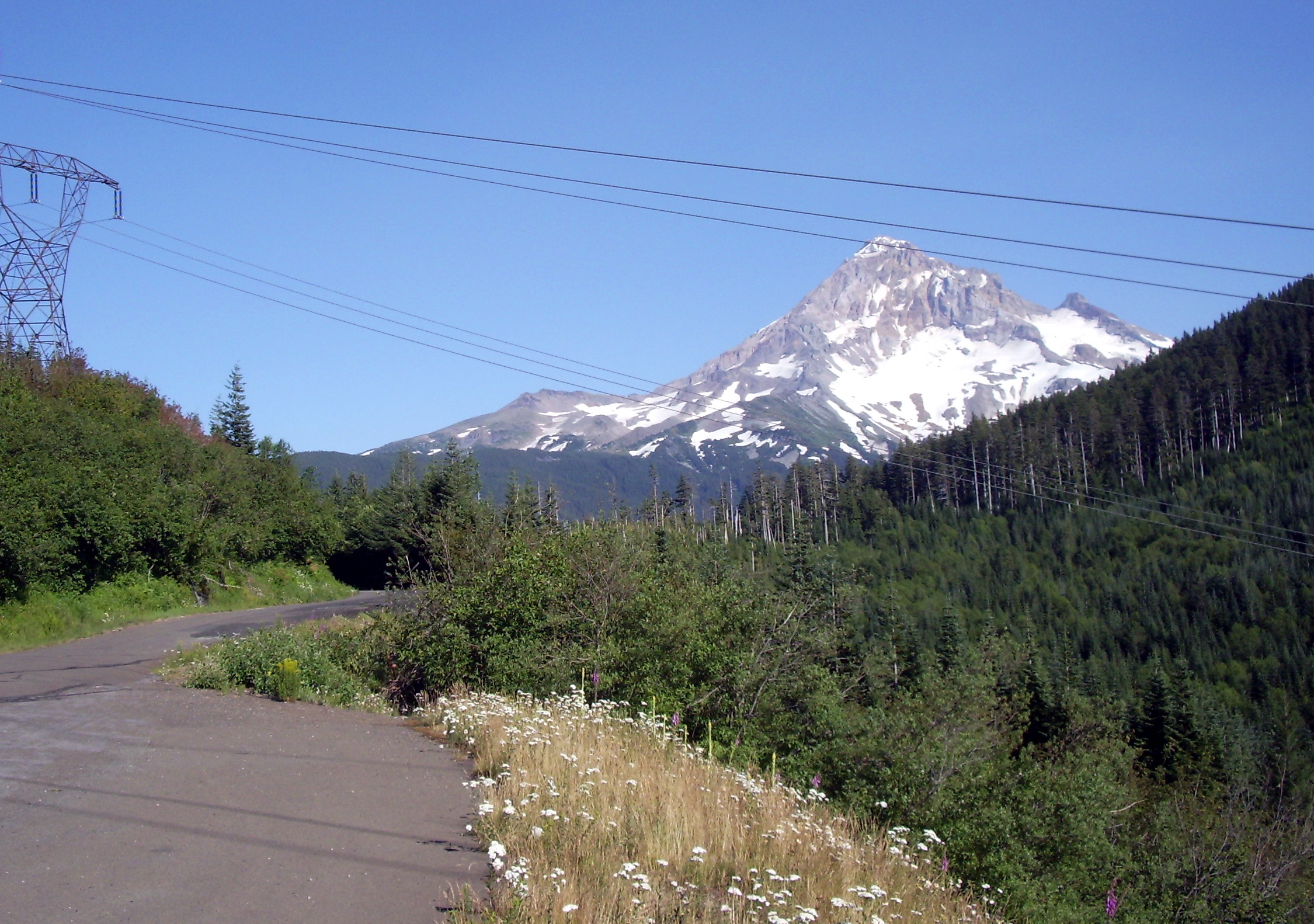
- Mount Hood visible behind Lolo Pass
- Interactive map of Lolo Pass
- Elevation: 3,415 feet (1,041 m)
- Traversed by: Lolo Pass Road

Third Approach
- Location: 10 km NW of Mount Hood; Mount Hood National Forest; Clackamas County, Oregon, U.S.; Hood River County, Oregon, U.S.
- Range: Cascades
- Coordinates: 45°25′36″N 121°47′45″W
- Topo map: Bull Run Lake

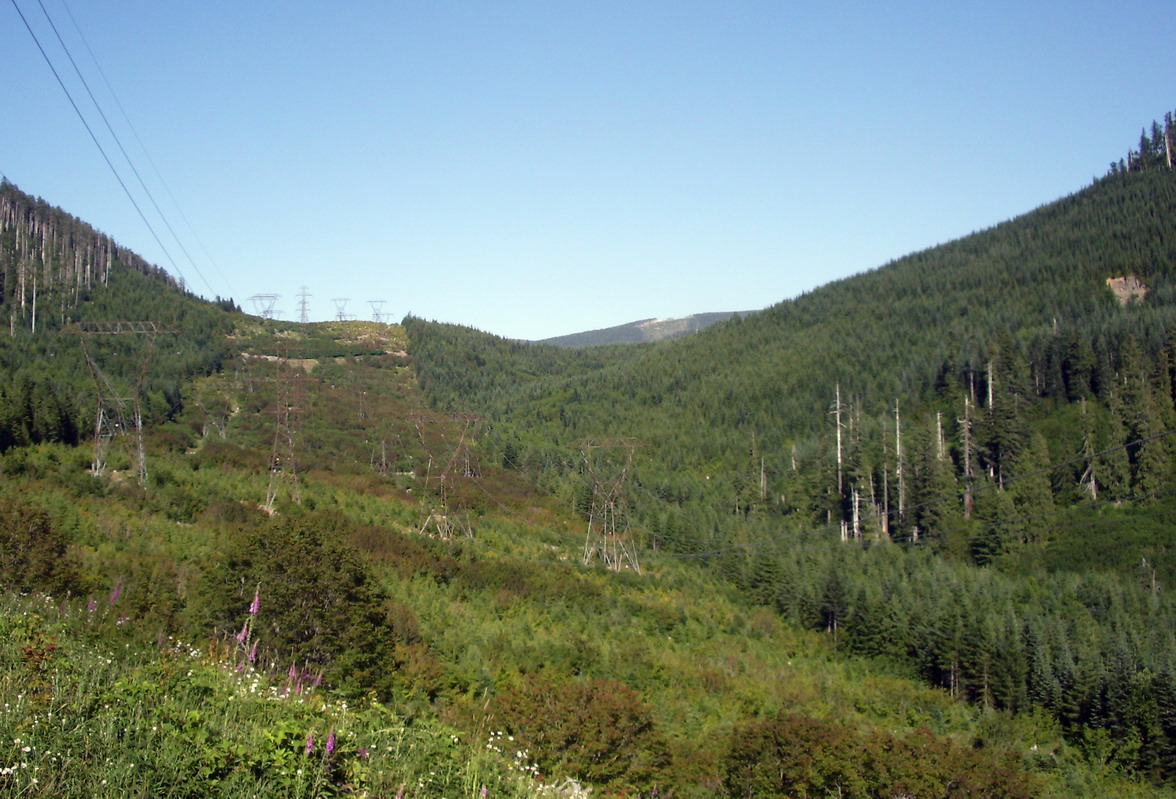
Lolo Pass seen from about a mile away

Lolo Pass is a mountain pass 6 miles (10 km) northwest of Mount Hood and 10 miles (16 km) northeast of Zigzag, Oregon, on the Clackamas–Hood River county line. It divides the Sandy River watershed on the southwest from the Hood River watershed on the northeast.

At 3,415 feet (1,041 m), it provides a much lower crossing of the Cascade Range near Mount Hood than the 4,650-foot (1,420 m) Oregon Route 35 Bennett Pass on the southeast side. Access from the southwest side of the pass is paved all the way to the pass, where the road changes to gravel, heading down the northeast side of the pass. Lolo Pass Road (Forest Road 18) is closed due to heavy snow each winter. The road through the pass was initially established by Native Americans, as a trading route connecting the Willamette Valley and sites at the eastern end of the Columbia River Gorge like Celilo Falls. In 1838, Daniel Lee (nephew of missionary Jason Lee) drove livestock across the pass, while traveling east to establish a new Methodist station, named Wascopam Mission. He was the first westerner known to have used the trail. The trail was then used as one of the final legs of the Oregon Trail; settlers arriving from The Dalles would often drive their livestock over the pass while their families floated down the river. The 1846 construction of the Barlow Road provided a less daunting alternate route around the south side of Mount Hood.

Lolo Pass is one of the milestones along the Pacific Crest Trail, though not a particularly low point for the region. By 5 miles (8 km) south of Lolo Pass, the Pacific Crest Trail drops to 2,800 feet (850 m) and much lower to the north at the Columbia River. A small campsite is located along the trail just south of the forest service road.
