= Ramona Falls (Oregon) =

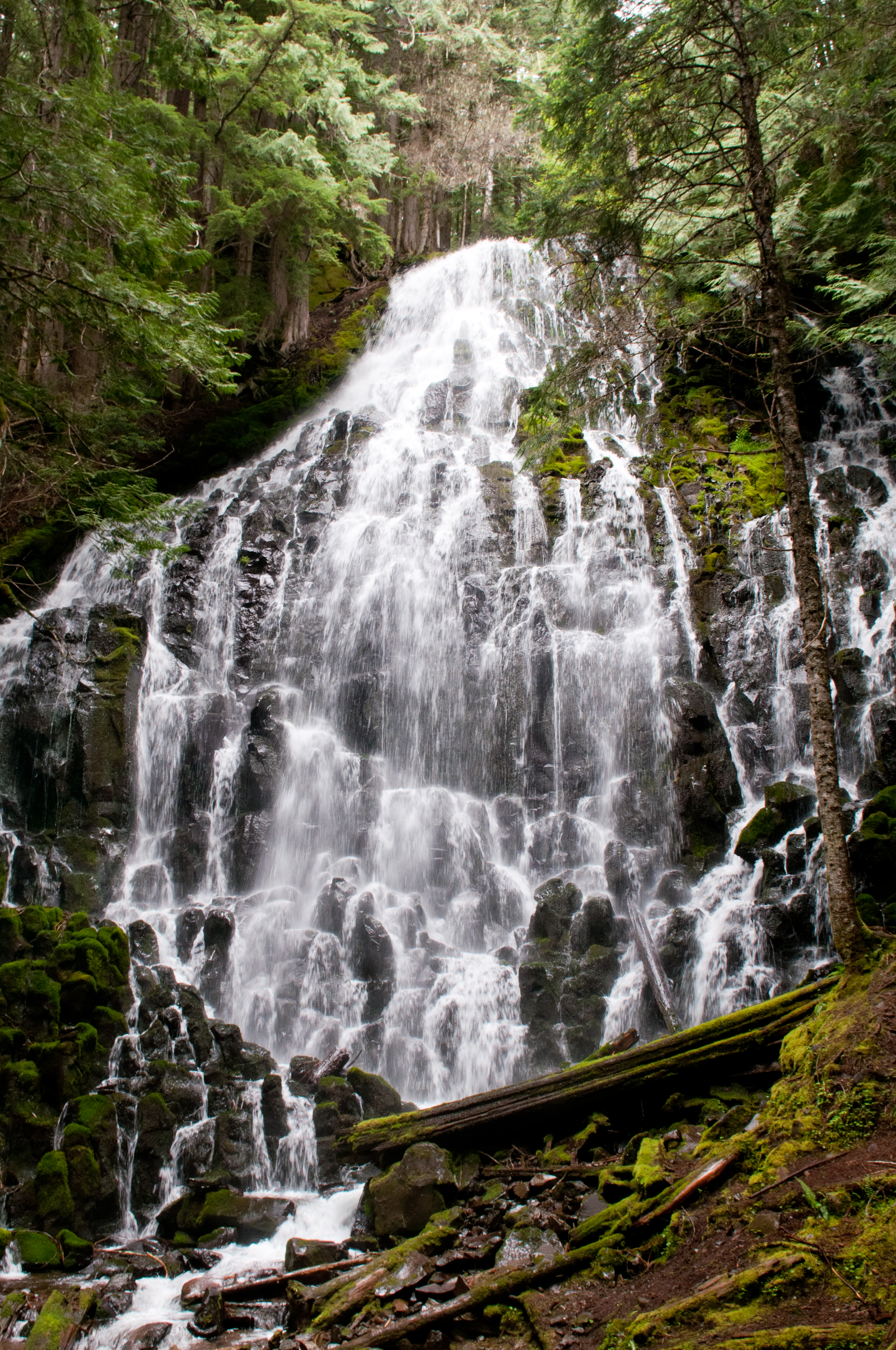
- Interactive map of Ramona Falls
- Location: Clackamas County, Oregon, United States
- Coordinates: 45°22′47″N 121°46′33″W
- Type: Horsetail
- Elevation: 3,560 feet (1,090 m)
- Total height: 120 feet (37 m)

Ramona Falls is a waterfall on the upper Sandy River on the west side of Mount Hood, Oregon, United States. It is located in forest along the Pacific Crest Trail at an elevation of 3,560 feet (1,090 m). The falls are about 120 feet (37 m) tall overall, consisting of a wall of cascades.
