= North Fork Bull Run River =

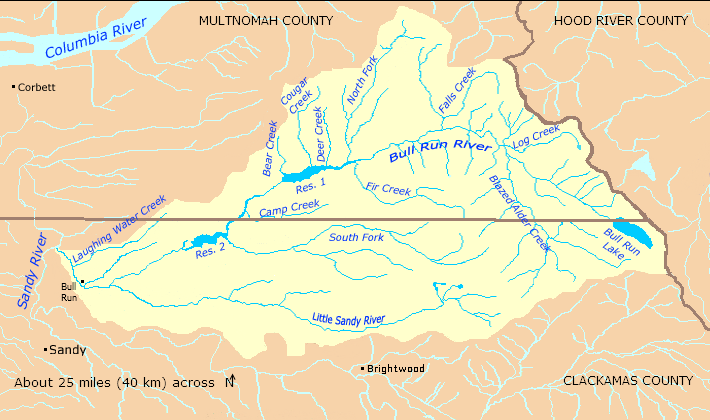
- Bull Run River watershed

- Location of the mouth of the North Fork Bull Run River in Oregon
- Etymology: Possibly after cattle that escaped and ran wild along the river between 1849 and 1855

Location
- Country: United States
- State: Oregon
- County: Multnomah County

Physical characteristics
- Source: Mount Hood National Forest
  - location: Palmer Lake, Multnomah County, Oregon
  - coordinates: 45°33′52″N 121°59′47″W
- Mouth: Bull Run River
  - location: Bull Run Reservoir 1, Multnomah County, Oregon
  - coordinates: 45°29′38″N 122°02′06″W
  - elevation: 1,096 ft (334 m)
- Length: 6 mi (9.7 km)
- Basin size: 8.32 sq mi (21.5 km^{2})
- Discharge
  - location: mouth
  - average: 72.6 cu ft/s (2.06 m^{3}/s)
  - minimum: 8.6 cu ft/s (0.24 m^{3}/s)
  - maximum: 9,700 cu ft/s (270 m^{3}/s)

The North Fork Bull Run River is a tributary, about 6 miles (10 km) long, of the Bull Run River in the U.S. state of Oregon. Part of the system that provides drinking water to the city of Portland, it flows generally south through a protected part of the Mount Hood National Forest in Multnomah County. It joins the Bull Run River at Bull Run Reservoir 1.

== Course ==
The river, which begins at Palmer Lake, slightly southeast of Palmer Peak, flows south and slightly west through Multnomah County and the Mount Hood National Forest within the Bull Run Watershed Management Unit (BRWMU). It receives an unnamed tributary from the right as it passes through Latourell Prairie. Another unnamed tributary enters from the left just before the North Fork reaches a United States Geological Survey (USGS) stream gauge and enters Bull Run Reservoir 1, which is part of the Bull Run River mainstem. The North Fork has no named tributaries. Its mouth is roughly 13.5 miles (21.7 km) from the confluence of the Bull Run River with the Sandy River.

=== Discharge ===
Since 1965, the USGS has monitored the flow of the North Fork Bull Run River at a stream gauge at the river mouth. The average flow between then and 2007 was 72.6 cubic feet per second (2.06 m^{3}/s). This is from a drainage area of 8.32 square miles (21.55 km^{2}). The maximum flow recorded during this period was 9,700 cubic feet per second (270 m^{3}/s) on January 20, 1972, probably affected by a surge of water related to a landslide. The minimum was 8.6 cubic feet per second (0.24 m^{3}/s) on October 19–29, 1987.

== Watershed ==
The Bull Run River watershed, which includes the North Fork Bull Run River, drains 139 square miles (360 km^{2}). The basin, which is the main source of Portland's drinking water, is largely restricted to uses related to water collection, storage, treatment, and forest management. The North Fork Bull Run River basin of 8.32 square miles (21.5 km^{2}) amounts to about 6 percent of the total Bull Run River watershed, which is managed by the Portland Water Bureau and the United States Forest Service.

== See also ==
- List of rivers of Oregon
- Bull Run National Forest

== Works cited ==
- McArthur, Lewis A., and McArthur, Lewis L. (2003) [1928]. Oregon Geographic Names, 4th edition. Portland: Oregon Historical Society Press. ISBN 0-87595-277-1.
- Portland Water Bureau (2007). "Landscape Conditions", Chapter 4 of Current Habitat Conditions in the Habitat Conservation Plan Area. Portland, Oregon: Portland Water Bureau. Retrieved March 9, 2010.
