= South Fork Bull Run River =

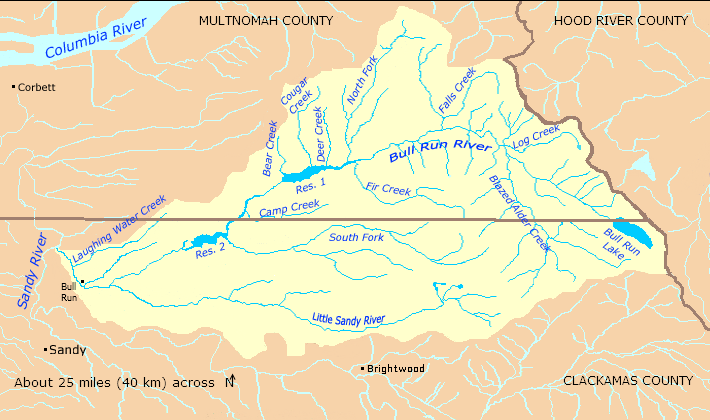
- Bull Run River watershed

- Location of the mouth of the South Fork Bull Run River in Oregon
- Etymology: Possibly after cattle that escaped and ran wild along the river between 1849 and 1855

Location
- Country: United States
- State: Oregon
- County: Clackamas County

Physical characteristics
- Source: Mount Hood National Forest
  - location: Township Meadow, Clackamas County, Oregon
  - coordinates: 45°26′02″N 121°59′20″W
  - elevation: 3,260 ft (990 m)
- Mouth: Bull Run River
  - location: Bull Run Reservoir 2, Clackamas County, Oregon
  - coordinates: 45°27′08″N 122°07′21″W
  - elevation: 863 ft (263 m)
- Length: 6 mi (9.7 km)
- Basin size: 15.4 sq mi (40 km^{2})
- Discharge
  - location: 0.6 miles (0.97 km) from the mouth
  - average: 111 cu ft/s (3.1 m^{3}/s)
  - minimum: 5.4 cu ft/s (0.15 m^{3}/s)
  - maximum: 3,630 cu ft/s (103 m^{3}/s)

The South Fork Bull Run River is a tributary, about 6 miles (9.7 km) long, of the Bull Run River in the U.S. state of Oregon. Part of the system that provides drinking water to the city of Portland, it flows generally west through a protected part of the Mount Hood National Forest in Clackamas County. It joins the Bull Run River at Bull Run Reservoir 2, about 8 miles (13 km) from the larger stream's confluence with the Sandy River.

== Course ==
The river, which begins in Township Meadow in the Mount Hood National Forest, flows northwest and then west through Clackamas County and the Mount Hood National Forest. It receives its only named tributary, Cedar Creek, from the right before reaching a United States Geological Survey (USGS) stream gauge 0.6 miles (0.97 km) from the mouth. The South Fork joins the main stem Bull Run River at the larger stream's river mile (RM) 8 or river kilometer (RK) 13, near the midpoint of Bull Run Reservoir 2.

=== Discharge ===
Since 1974, the USGS has monitored the flow of the South Fork Bull Run River at a stream gauge 0.6 miles (0.97 km) from the mouth. The average flow between then and 2008 was 111 cubic feet per second (3.1 m^{3}/s). This is from a drainage area of 15.40 square miles (39.89 km^{2}). The maximum flow recorded during this period was 3,630 cubic feet per second (103 m^{3}/s) on February 7, 1996. The minimum was 5.4 cubic feet per second (0.15 m^{3}/s) on October 13, 1994.

== Watershed ==
The Bull Run River watershed, which includes the South Fork Bull Run River, drains 139 square miles (360 km^{2}). The basin, which is the main source of Portland's drinking water, is largely restricted to uses related to water collection, storage, treatment, and forest management. The South Fork Bull Run River basin of about 15.4 square miles (40 km^{2}) amounts to about 11 percent of the total Bull Run River watershed, which is managed by the Portland Water Bureau and the United States Forest Service.

== See also ==
- List of rivers of Oregon
- Bull Run National Forest

== Works cited ==
- McArthur, Lewis A., and McArthur, Lewis L. (2003) [1928]. Oregon Geographic Names, 4th edition. Portland: Oregon Historical Society Press. ISBN 0-87595-277-1.
- Portland Water Bureau (2007). "Landscape Conditions", Chapter 4 of Current Habitat Conditions in the Habitat Conservation Plan Area. Portland, Oregon: Portland Water Bureau. Retrieved March 9, 2010.
