= Blazed Alder Creek =

- Location of the mouth of Blazed Alder Creek in Oregon
- Etymology: A 24-inch (61 cm) blazed (marked) alder tree near the mouth of the creek. It was used as a benchmark during early watershed surveys.

Location
- Country: United States
- State: Oregon
- County: Clackamas and Multnomah counties

Physical characteristics
- Source: Mount Hood National Forest
  - location: Blazed Alder Butte, Clackamas County, Oregon
  - coordinates: 45°27′05″N 121°53′21″W
- Mouth: Bull Run River
  - location: Multnomah County, Oregon
  - coordinates: 45°29′47″N 121°55′18″W
  - elevation: 1,699 ft (518 m)
- Length: 4 mi (6.4 km)
- Discharge
  - location: 600 feet (180 m) downstream of the source
  - average: 57.5 cu ft/s (1.63 m^{3}/s)
  - minimum: 1 cu ft/s (0.028 m^{3}/s)
  - maximum: 2,610 cu ft/s (74 m^{3}/s)

Blazed Alder Creek is a tributary, about 4 miles (6 km) long, of the Bull Run River in the U.S. state of Oregon. Part of the system that provides drinking water to the city of Portland, it flows generally north through a protected part of the Mount Hood National Forest in Clackamas and Multnomah counties. The creek is named after a 24-inch (61 cm) blazed (marked) alder tree that was used as a benchmark during early watershed surveys.

== Course ==
Formed by the confluence of Bedrock Creek and Hickman Creek in Clackamas County, Blazed Alder Creek begins slightly north of Blazed Alder Butte and flows through the Mount Hood National Forest to meet the Bull Run River in Multnomah County. The creek lies entirely within the Bull Run Watershed Management Unit, a restricted area meant to protect the water supply for the city of Portland. Flowing north from its source in the western foothills of the Cascade Range, the creek passes a United States Geological Survey (USGS) stream gauge before receiving Nanny Creek from the left just before leaving Clackamas County and entering Multnomah County. Further downstream, it receives an unnamed tributary from the left before entering the Bull Run River.

=== Discharge ===
Since 1963, the USGS has monitored the flow of Blazed Alder Creek at a stream gauge 3.68 miles (5.92 km) from the mouth and only 600 feet (180 m) from the source. The average flow between then and 2009 was 57.5 cubic feet per second (1.63 m^{3}/s). This is from a drainage area of 8.17 square miles (21.16 km^{2}). The maximum flow recorded during this period was 2,610 cubic feet per second (74 m^{3}/s) on December 22, 1964. It occurred during the floods of December 1964 and January 1965, rated by the National Weather Service as one of Oregon's top 10 weather events of the 20th century. The minimum was 1.0 cubic foot per second (0.028 m^{3}/s) on December 2–7, 2003.

== Watershed ==
The Bull Run River watershed, which includes Blazed Alder Creek, drains 139 square miles (360 km^{2}). Most of the watershed, including all of the Blazed Alder Creek basin, is restricted to uses related to water collection, storage, treatment, and forest management. The Portland Water Bureau and the United States Forest Service manage the watershed.

== See also ==
- List of rivers of Oregon
- Bull Run National Forest

== Works cited ==
- McArthur, Lewis A., and McArthur, Lewis L. (2003) [1928]. Oregon Geographic Names, 4th edition. Portland: Oregon Historical Society Press. ISBN 0-87595-277-1.
- Portland Water Bureau (2007). "Landscape Conditions", Chapter 4 of Current Habitat Conditions in the Habitat Conservation Plan Area. Portland, Oregon: Portland Water Bureau. Retrieved March 9, 2010.
