= Fir Creek (Bull Run River tributary) =

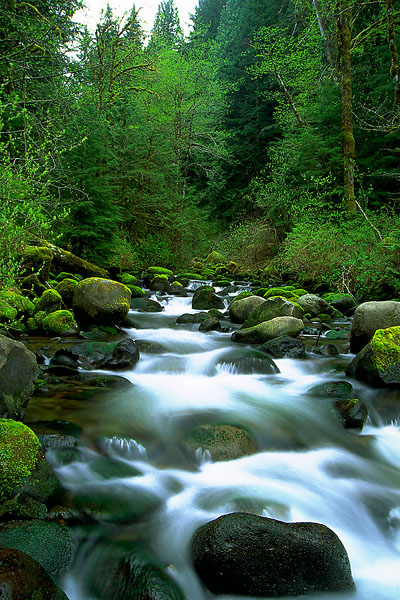
- Fir Creek

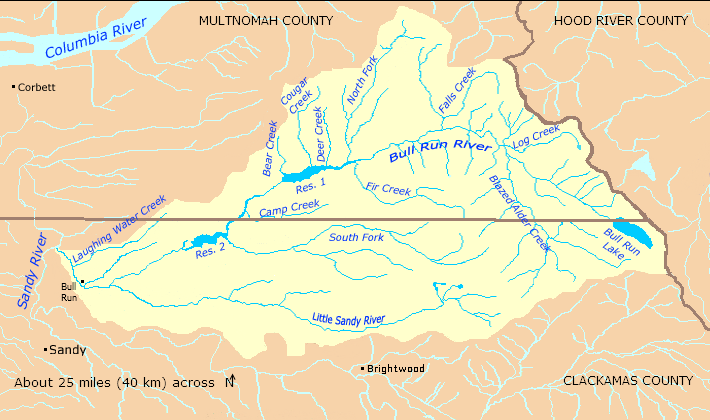
- Bull Run River watershed

- Location of the mouth of Fir Creek in Oregon

Location
- Country: United States
- State: Oregon
- County: Multnomah and Clackamas counties

Physical characteristics
- Source: Mount Hood National Forest
  - location: Clackamas County, Oregon
  - coordinates: 45°27′36″N 121°57′07″W
- Mouth: Bull Run River
  - location: Multnomah County, Oregon
  - coordinates: 45°29′26″N 122°01′41″W
  - elevation: 1,089 ft (332 m)
- Length: 5 mi (8.0 km)
- Basin size: 5.46 sq mi (14.1 km^{2})
- Discharge
  - location: 0.6 miles (1 km) from the mouth
  - average: 34.5 cu ft/s (0.98 m^{3}/s)
  - minimum: 1.4 cu ft/s (0.040 m^{3}/s)
  - maximum: 1,690 cu ft/s (48 m^{3}/s)

Fir Creek is a tributary, about 5 miles (8 km) long, of the Bull Run River in the U.S. state of Oregon. Part of the system that provides drinking water to the city of Portland, it flows generally northwest through a protected part of the Mount Hood National Forest in Clackamas and Multnomah counties. It joins the Bull Run River at the upper end of Bull Run Reservoir 1, about 14 miles (23 km) from the larger stream's confluence with the Sandy River.

== Course ==
The creek arises in the Mount Hood National Forest in northern Clackamas County near its border with Multnomah County. The stream flows north, crossing the border almost immediately and entering Multnomah County. Turning west, it receives an unnamed tributary from the right before turning gradually northwest. It passes under Forest Road 1211 and by a United States Geological Survey (USGS) stream gauge 0.6 miles (1 km) from the mouth. The creek joins the main stem Bull Run River near the upper end of Bull Run Reservoir 1, about 14 miles (23 km) from where the river joins the Sandy River.

=== Discharge ===
Since 1975 the USGS has monitored the flow of Fir Creek at a stream gauge 0.6 miles (1 km) from the mouth. The average flow between then and 2009 was 34.5 cubic feet per second (0.98 m^{3}/s). This is from a drainage area of about 6 square miles (16 km^{2}). The maximum flow recorded during this period was 1,690 cubic feet per second (48 m^{3}/s) on November 25, 1999. The minimum was 1.4 cubic feet per second (0.04 m^{3}/s) on September 5–7, 2003.

== Watershed ==
The Bull Run River watershed, which includes Fir Creek, drains 139 square miles (360 km^{2}). The basin, which is the main source of Portland's drinking water, is largely restricted to uses related to water collection, storage, treatment, and forest management. The Fir Creek basin of about 6 square miles (16 km^{2}) amounts to about 4 percent of the total Bull Run River watershed, which is managed by the Portland Water Bureau and the United States Forest Service.

== See also ==
- List of rivers of Oregon
- Bull Run National Forest

== Works cited ==
- Portland Water Bureau (2007). "Landscape Conditions", Chapter 4 of Current Habitat Conditions in the Habitat Conservation Plan Area. Portland, Oregon: Portland Water Bureau. Retrieved March 9, 2010.
