= Lusted Road Bridge =

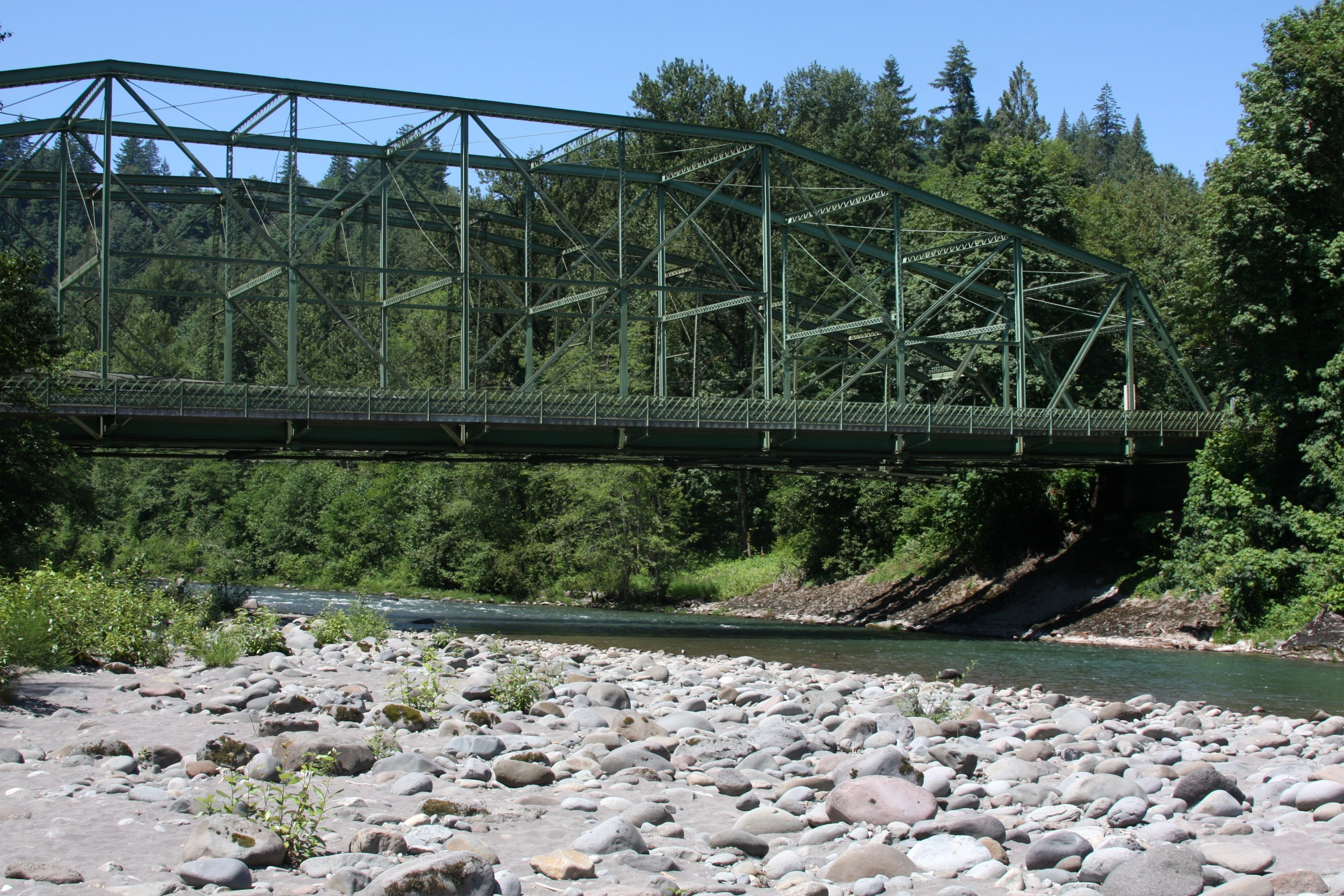
- Coordinates: 45.44493°N 122.25364°W
- Carries: Lusted Road
- Crosses: Sandy River
- Locale: Sandy, Oregon, U.S.
- Owner: Oregon Department of Transportation

Characteristics
- Design: Pennsylvania truss
- Material: Iron
- Total length: 300 feet (91 m)
- Width: 34 feet (10 m)

History
- Construction end: 1894

The Lusted Road Bridge, formerly known as the Portland Water Works Bridge, is an iron truss bridge that spans the Sandy River in Sandy, Clackamas County, Oregon, United States. Constructed for the Portland Water Works in 1894, the bridge was originally located in Portland and spanned the Willamette River.

== History ==
Constructed for the Portland Water Works in 1894, the Lusted Road Bridge was designed by W. B. Chase of Portland, a railroad engineer. It was fabricated by the Bullen Bridge Company. Originally constructed in Portland and spanning the Willamette River, the bridge was known as the Portland Water Works Bridge.

In 1926, after the completion of the Burnside Bridge, the bridge was dismantled and relocated. The west approach of the bridge was located to Bull Run, where it spans the Bull Run River, while its east portion was relocated to its current location in Sandy, where it replaced a pre-existing truss bridge that provided access to Dodge Park.

In the 1980s, the bridge was recognized as one of the state's significant historic bridges, and in 1998, it was rehabilitated by Clackamas County.
