= Bull Run River (Oregon) =

Tributary of the Sandy River in Oregon, United States

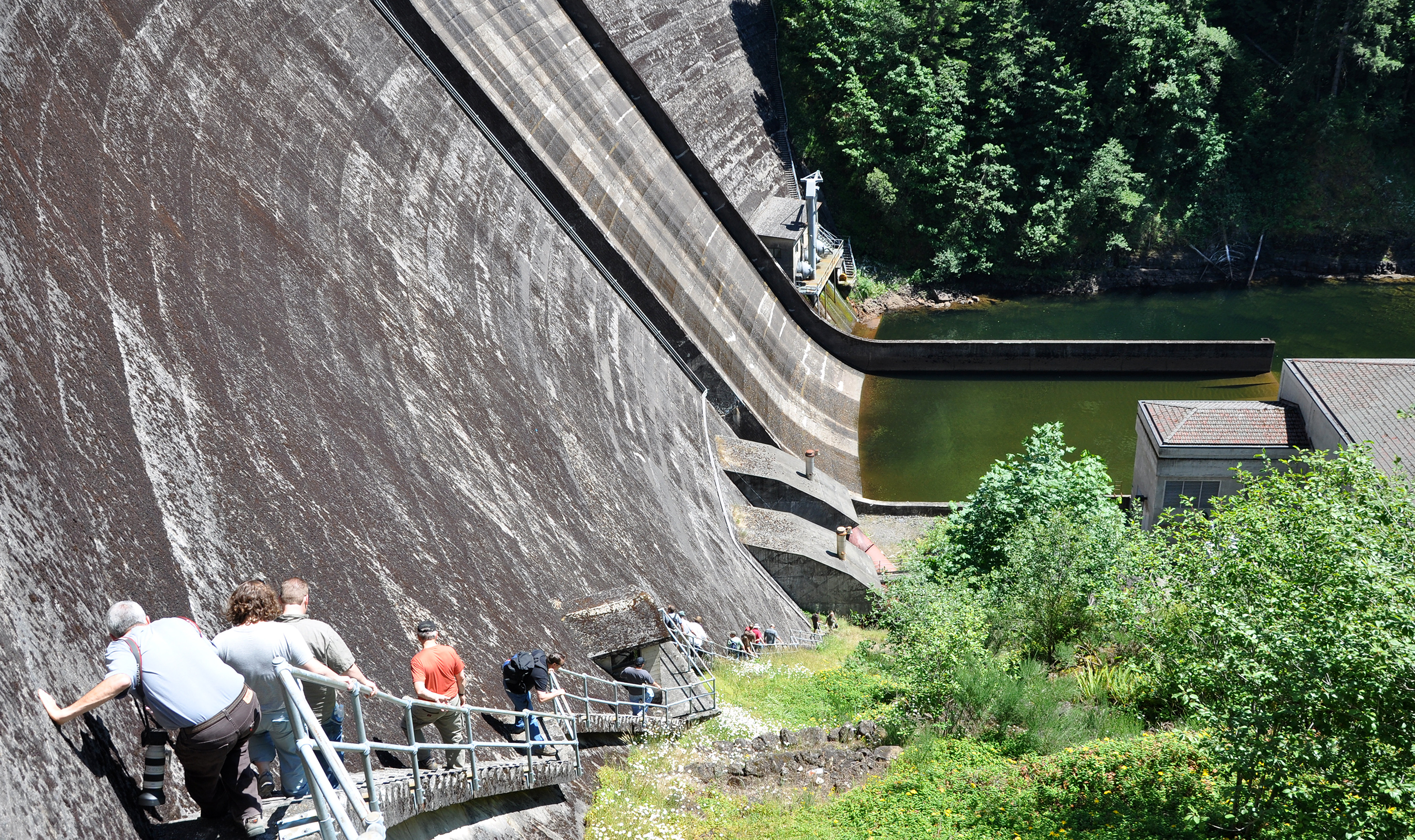
- Visitors descend the downstream side of Dam 1 on the Bull Run River.

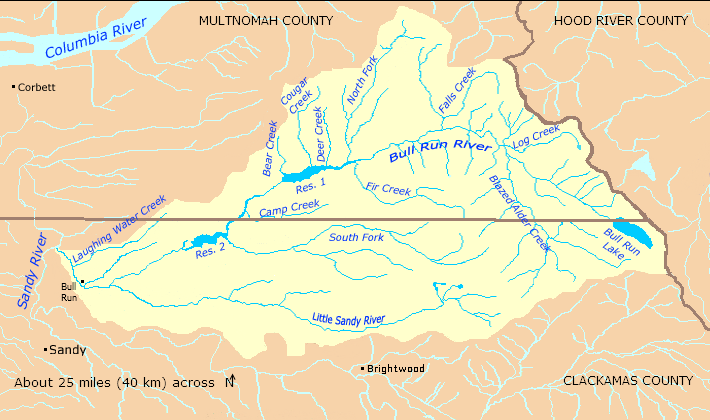
- Bull Run River watershed

- Location of the mouth of the Bull Run River in Oregon
- Etymology: Possibly after cattle that escaped and ran wild along the river between 1849 and 1855

Location
- Country: United States
- State: Oregon
- County: Clackamas County, Multnomah County

Physical characteristics
- Source: Mount Hood National Forest
  - location: near Bull Run Lake, Clackamas County, Oregon
  - coordinates: 45°26′09″N 121°48′39″W
  - elevation: 4,259 ft (1,298 m)
- Mouth: Sandy River
  - location: Dodge Park, Clackamas County, Oregon
  - coordinates: 45°26′46″N 122°14′48″W
  - elevation: 243 ft (74 m)
- Length: 21.9 mi (35.2 km)
- Basin size: 140 sq mi (360 km^{2})
- Discharge
  - location: Mount Hood National Forest, 14.8 miles (23.8 km) from the mouth
  - average: 404 cu ft/s (11.4 m^{3}/s)
  - minimum: 30 cu ft/s (0.85 m^{3}/s)
  - maximum: 15,800 cu ft/s (450 m^{3}/s)

The Bull Run River is a 21.9-mile (35.2 km) tributary of the Sandy River in the U.S. state of Oregon. Beginning at the lower end of Bull Run Lake in the Cascade Range, it flows generally west through the Bull Run Watershed Management Unit (BRWMU), a restricted area meant to protect the river and its tributaries from contamination. The river, impounded by two artificial storage reservoirs as well as the lake, is the primary source of drinking water for the city of Portland, Oregon.

It is likely that Native Americans living along the Columbia River as early as 10,000 years ago visited the Bull Run watershed in search of food. Within the past few thousand years they created trails over the Cascade Range and around Mount Hood, near the upper part of the Bull Run watershed. By the mid-19th century, pioneers used these trails to cross the mountains from east to west to reach the fertile Willamette Valley. In the 1890s, the City of Portland, searching for sources of clean drinking water, chose the Bull Run River. Dam-building, road construction, and legal action to protect the watershed began shortly thereafter, and Bull Run water began to flow through a large pipe to the city in 1895.

Erosion-resistant basalt underlies much of the watershed, and streams passing over it are relatively free of sediments. However, turbidity increases when unstable soils sandwiched between layers of basalt and other volcanic rocks are disturbed and wash into the river during rainstorms. Despite legal protections, about 22 percent of the protected zone was logged during the second half of the 20th century, and erosion increased. For a time in 1996, Portland had to shut down the Bull Run supply because of turbidity and switch to water from wells. A law passed later that year prohibited most logging in or near the watershed, and since then the Portland Water Bureau and the United States Forest Service have closed many of the logging roads and removed culverts and other infrastructure contributing to erosion.

Mature trees, most of them more than 500 years old and more than 21 inches (53 cm) in diameter, cover about half of the watershed, and the rest of the watershed is also heavily forested. Annual precipitation ranges from 80 inches (2,000 mm) near the water supply intake to as much as 170 inches (4,300 mm) near the headwaters. More than 250 wildlife species, including the protected northern spotted owl, inhabit this forest. Downstream of the BRWMU, the watershed is far less restricted. In the late 19th century, an unincorporated community, Bull Run, became established near the river in conjunction with a hydroelectric project and a related railroad line. About 6 miles (10 km) of the lower river is open to fishing and boating, and the land at the confluence of the Bull Run and Sandy rivers has been a public park since the early 20th century.

== Course ==
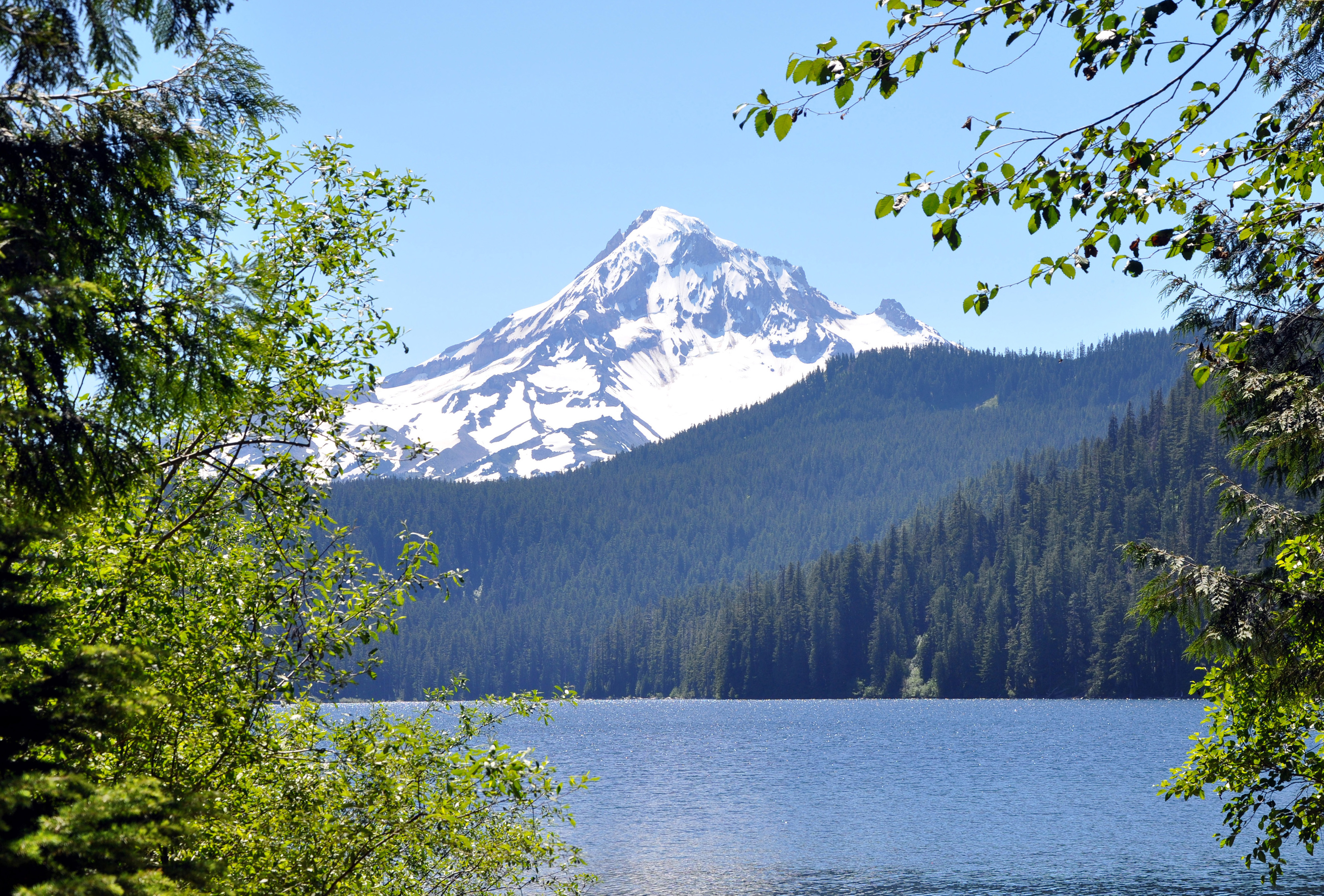
The Bull Run River begins at Bull Run Lake. Mount Hood, beyond the Bull Run watershed, rises in the distance, about 8 miles (13 km) to the southeast.

The Bull Run River begins at Bull Run Lake, a natural body of water modified slightly by the Portland Water Bureau, near Hiyo Mountain in the Mount Hood Wilderness. (Note: The river begins at the dam at the southwest end of the lake near the water-stage recorder at RM 29.1 (RK 46.8). Surface flow from the lake occurs only when the Portland Water Bureau deliberately releases water. Even when water is not flowing on the surface, it constantly seeps through unconsolidated rock near and under the dam and emerges in springs further down the drainage.) Originating in Clackamas County north of Forest Road 18 (Lolo Pass Road), its unnamed headwater tributaries enter the lake. Flowing northwest from the lake, the river immediately enters Multnomah County and continues generally northwest for about 5 miles (8 km). Along this stretch, the river flows by a United States Geological Survey (USGS) stream gauge at river mile (RM) 20.9 or river kilometer (RK) 30.6, passes under Forest Road 1025 and Forest Road 10 and receives Blazed Alder Creek from the left and Log Creek and Falls Creek, both from the right. Then the river turns southwest and passes another stream gauge just before entering Bull Run River Reservoir 1 at RM 15 (RK 24). Also entering the reservoir are Fir Creek from the left, North Fork Bull Run River from the right, then Deer, Cougar, and Bear creeks, all from the right. The Bull Run River exits the reservoir via a spillway 11 miles (18 km) from the river mouth. Forest Road 10 runs roughly parallel to the right bank of the river from near the headwaters to Southwest Bull Run Road, near the mouth.

Entering Bull Run River Reservoir 2, the river receives Camp Creek from the left, re-enters Clackamas County, and receives South Fork Bull Run River from the left. The river exits the reservoir via a spillway at about RM 6 (RK 10). Below Reservoir 2, Forest Road 10 (Waterworks Road) is on the river's right bank, and Forest Road 14 is on the left. The river flows by a stream gauge at RM 4.7 (RK 7.6) and passes under Forest Road 14 before receiving the Little Sandy River from the left at about RM 2 (RK 3). The river then turns northwest, passes under an unnamed road and then under Southeast Bull Run Road near the unincorporated community of Bull Run, which is on the river's right, and the defunct powerhouse of the Bull Run Hydroelectric Project, which is on the left. Southeast Camp Namanu Road runs roughly parallel to the river along its right bank from here to the mouth. Along this stretch, the river receives Laughing Water Creek from the right and enters the Sandy River at Dodge Park, about 18.5 miles (29.8 km) from the larger river's confluence with the Columbia River.

=== Discharge ===
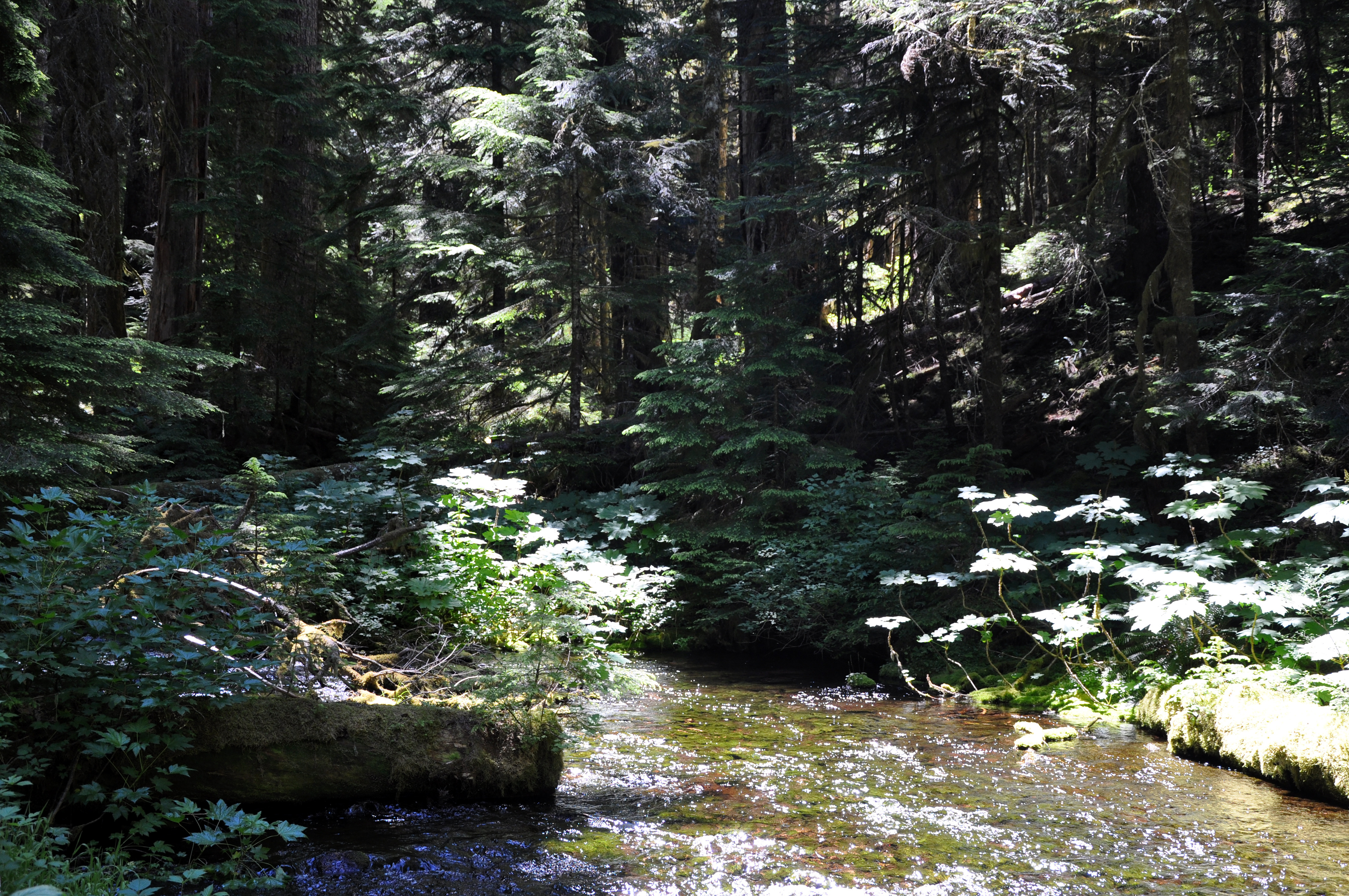
Bull Run River near its headwaters in Mount Hood National Forest

The USGS and the water bureau operate a stream gauge at RM 4.7 (RK 7.6), which is 1.8 miles (2.9 km) downstream from Bull Run Reservoir 2 and the water system intake. Measurements are for the river only and do not include water diverted upstream of the gauge to the city water supply or to a former power plant. The maximum flow at this station was 24,800 cubic feet per second (700 m^{3}/s) on December 22, 1964, and the minimum flow was 1.1 cubic feet per second (0.031 m^{3}/s) on October 4, 1974. The drainage area above this gauge is 107 square miles (280 km^{2}), about 77 percent of the whole watershed. The maximum flow occurred during the floods of December 1964 and January 1965, rated by the National Weather Service as one of Oregon's top 10 weather events of the 20th century.

Since 1966, the USGS has monitored the flow of the Bull Run River at a stream gauge 14.8 miles (23.8 km) from the mouth. The average flow between then and 2008 was 404 cubic feet per second (11.4 m^{3}/s). This is from a drainage area of 47.90 square miles (124.06 km^{2}), about 34 percent of the entire watershed. The maximum flow recorded during this period was 15,800 cubic feet per second (450 m^{3}/s) on November 5, 1999. The minimum was 30 cubic feet per second (0.85 m^{3}/s) on October 28–31, 1987.

The uppermost stream gauge on the main stem is at RM 20.9 (RK 30.6), 1 mile (1.6 km) downstream from the outlet structure at Bull Run Lake. In operation since 1992, the gauge recorded an average flow of 26.1 cubic feet per second (0.74 m^{3}/s) between then and 2009. This was from a drainage area of 5.08 square miles (13.2 km^{2}), about 4 percent of the total watershed. The maximum flow recorded during this period was 148 cubic feet per second (4.2 m^{3}/s) on February 7, 1996. The minimum was 8.2 cubic feet per second (0.23 m^{3}/s) on October 28, 1992.

In addition to the three main-stem gauges, the USGS operates five other stream gauges in the Bull Run watershed. Each of the following tributaries has one gauge: Fir Creek, Blazed Alder Creek, the North Fork, the South Fork, and the Little Sandy.

Near the outlet structure of Bull Run Lake, a USGS water-stage recorder at RM 21.9 (RK 46.8) has collected data on lake levels since 1992. The maximum lake content between then and 2009 was 48,340 acre-feet (59,630,000 m^{3}) on February 9, 1996, and the minimum was 31,080 acre-feet (38,340,000 m^{3}) on October 29, 1992. The two Bull Run reservoirs are also equipped with water-stage recorders.

== Geology ==
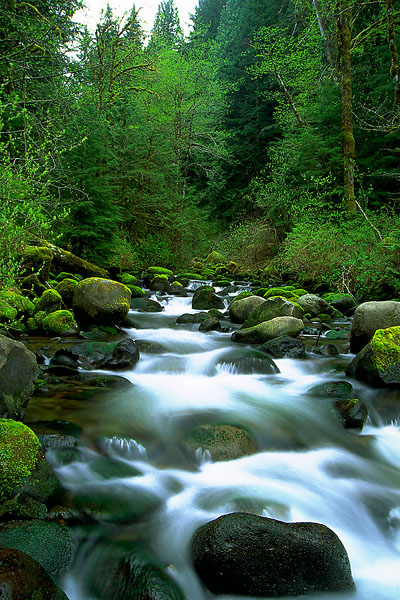
Fir Creek, a Bull Run River tributary

Columbia River basalts, 10 to 20 million years old, that underlie much of the Bull Run watershed are exposed near the bottoms of steep canyons along the river and its tributaries. In the western half of the watershed, the Rhododendron formation, rich in sediments, overlies the basalt, and later volcanic flows of basalt and andesite overlie both older formations. Areas of thick talus occur in the eastern part of the watershed at elevations higher than 2,500 feet (760 m) above sea level, and north-facing slopes above 2,600 feet (790 m) show evidence of glaciation. Over many centuries, streams in the watershed have carved canyons through the Rhododendron formation to the level of the basalt. Since basalt resists erosion, water traveling over it remains relatively free of sediments. Less than 2 percent of the watershed is at high risk for landslides.

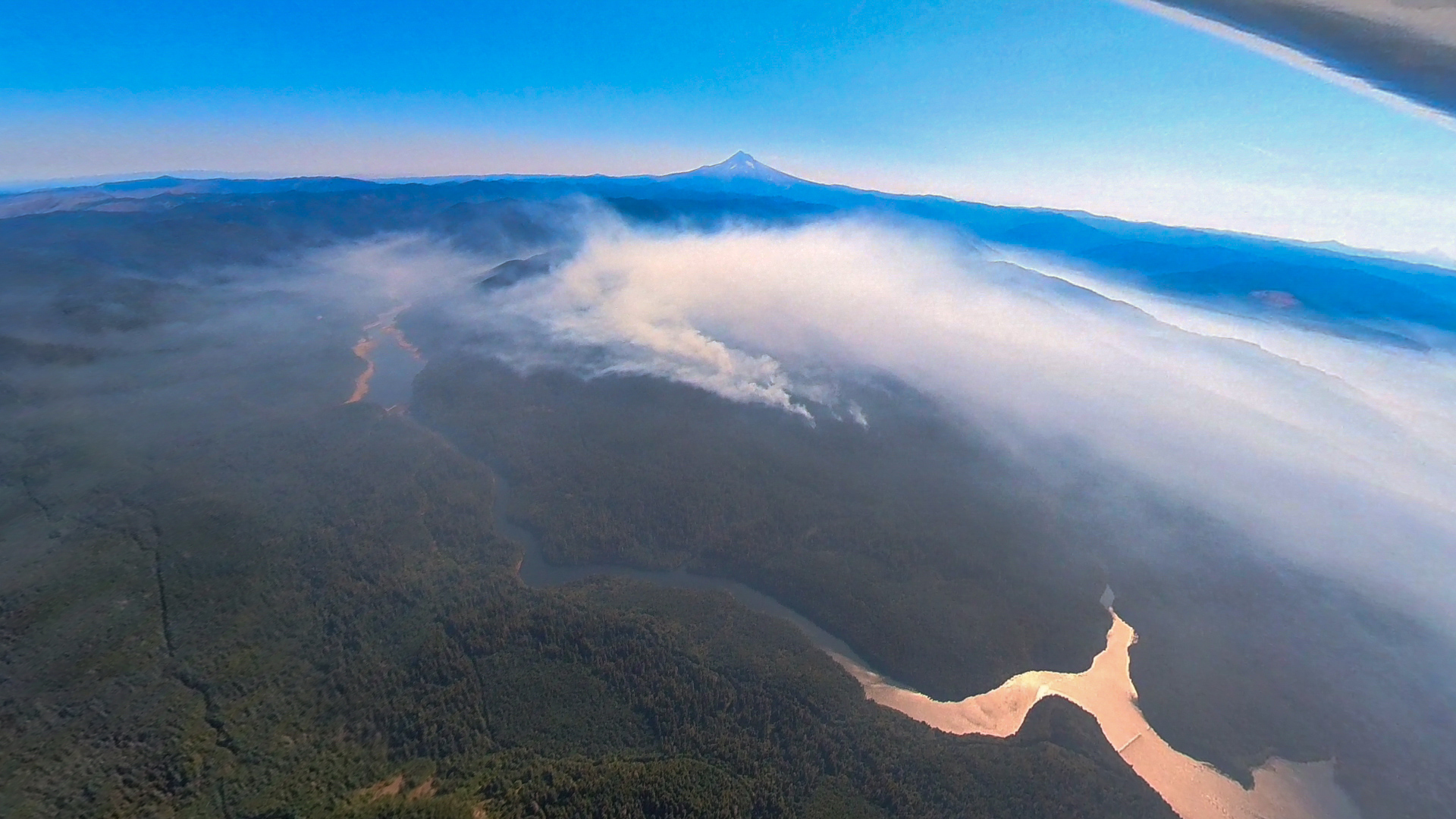
Bull Run Reservoir and the 2023 Camp Creek Fire

The Bull Run River's three reservoirs—Bull Run Lake, Bull Run Reservoir 1, and Bull Run Reservoir 2—are oligotrophic and do not sustain many life forms. Bull Run Lake is in a steep-sided cirque blocked at its lower end by a series of lava flows topped by debris from a glacial moraine. Small streams flow into the lake from ridges above it, and water exits the lake mainly by seeping through porous rock to enter the Bull Run River about 0.5 miles (0.80 km) downstream. Evidence suggests that over the past several thousand years, although forest fires in the area and volcanic activity on Mount Hood or Mount St. Helens have caused temporary changes in the lake's limnological condition, it "has always returned to conditions similar to those seen at present." Turbidity is sometimes a problem in Reservoirs 1 and 2 when unstable soils sandwiched between layers of lava erode into tributaries, especially the North and South forks.

== History ==
=== First peoples ===
Archeological evidence suggests that Native Americans lived along the lower Columbia River as early as 10,000 years ago. The area near what later became The Dalles, on the Columbia east of the mouth of the Sandy River, eventually became an important trading center. The Indians established villages on floodplains and traveled seasonally to gather huckleberries and other food on upland meadows, to fish for salmon, and to hunt elk and deer. Although no direct evidence exists that these lower-Columbia Indians traveled up the Sandy, it is likely that they did. Traces of these people include petroglyphs carved into the rocks of the Columbia River Gorge. Within the past few thousand years, Indians created trails across the Cascade Range around Mount Hood. In the 19th century, this trail network linked the Wascopam Mission near The Dalles to settlements in the Willamette Valley. One popular trail crossed over Lolo Pass, near the headwaters of the Bull Run River, and another, which later became the Barlow Road, met the Lolo Pass trail roughly where the Zigzag and Salmon rivers enter the Sandy. Indians from villages along the Columbia, Clackamas, and other rivers also traveled by water to the lower Sandy River area to fish for salmon and to gather berries, nuts and roots. The Klickitat tribe referred to Bull Run Lake as Gohabedikt, meaning "Loon Lake".

=== Explorers, settlers, and waterworks ===
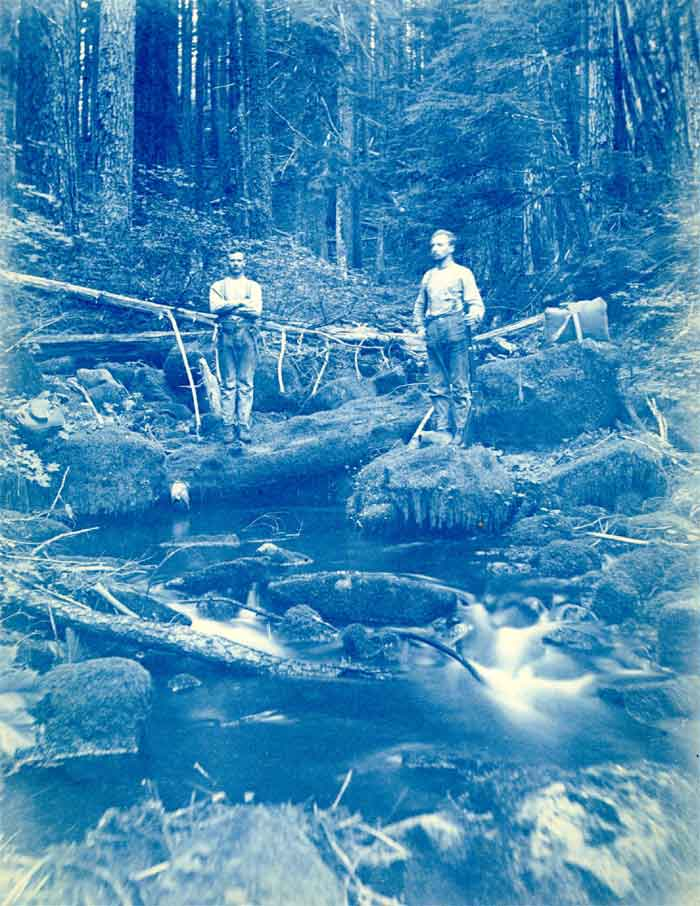
Exploration of the Bull Run River in 1891

Before the Lewis and Clark Expedition of 1805, few Europeans or European-Americans had visited the Sandy River basin. One of the first documented visits to the upper Sandy occurred in 1838, when Daniel Lee drove cattle from the Willamette Valley to Wascopam via the Indian trail over Lolo Pass. By 1840, pioneers were using the trail to cross the Cascades, and the Barlow Road, following another old trail, opened in 1846. One of its branches ran along the Devil's Backbone, a ridge separating the Sandy and Little Sandy basins. A few of these newcomers settled along the Sandy River.

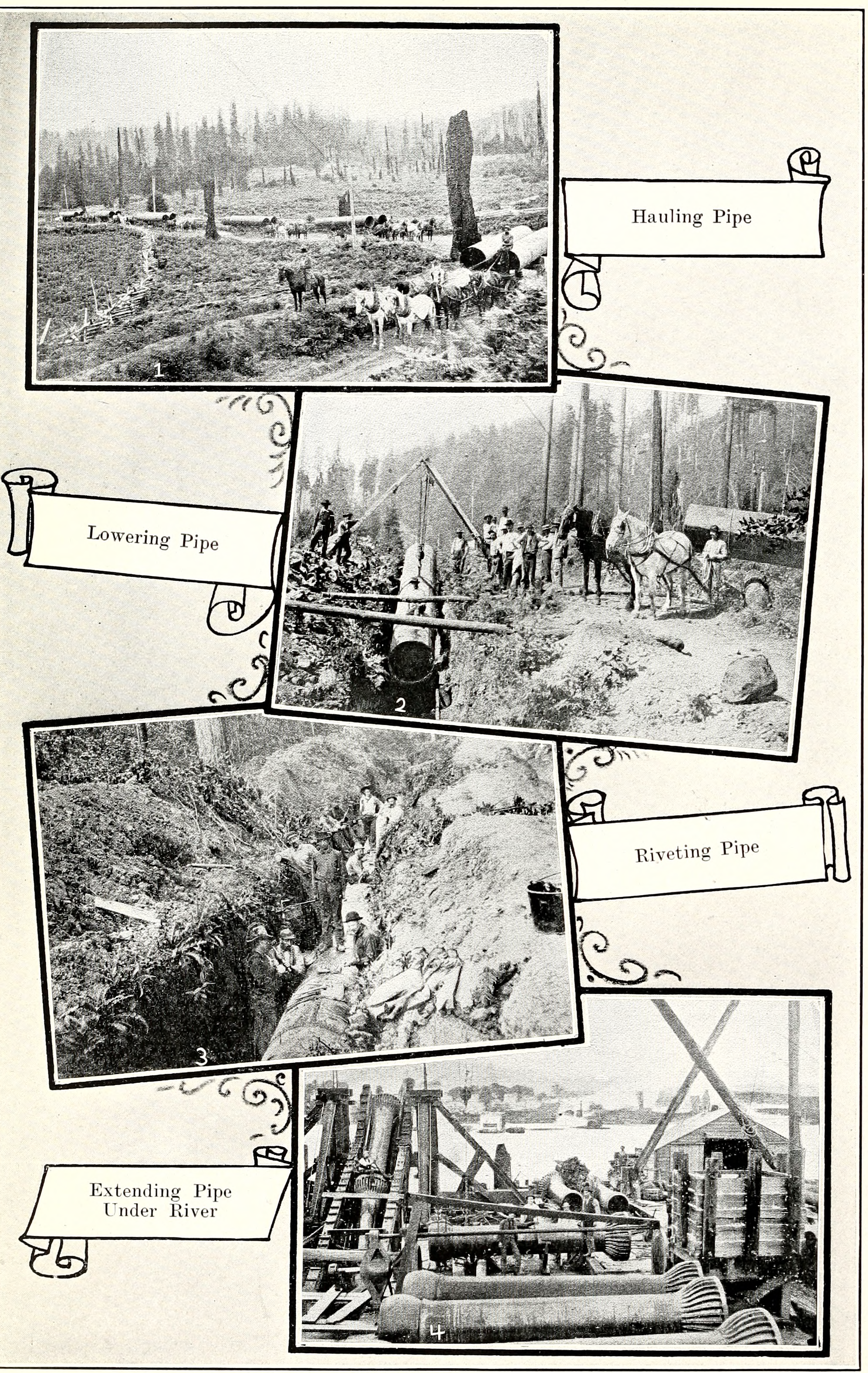
Construction of the first Bull Run conduit.

In 1886, the Portland Water Committee, predecessor of the Portland Water Bureau, began a search for a superior drinking water source. The committee, led by Henry Failing, commissioned Isaac W. Smith, an engineer and surveyor, to inspect any viable water supply in the region. Smith chose the Bull Run River, and a five-month survey trip led him to conclude that a gravity-flow system could deliver clean water from Bull Run to Portland. In 1892, U.S. President Benjamin Harrison signed a proclamation creating a protected area, the Bull Run Reserve, in the watershed. By 1895 Portland had built a diversion dam on the Bull Run River, and completed its first conduit (Conduit 1) to carry Bull Run water to the city. At about the same time as the Smith survey, a small farming community, at first named Unavilla but renamed Bull Run in 1895, grew up near the confluence of the Bull Run and Sandy rivers. Meanwhile, improvements to the Barlow Road encouraged population growth along the lower Sandy and the establishment of cities like Gresham and Sandy. Even so, by 1900 much of the upper Sandy basin was still remote, wild, and accessible mainly by trails.

Expanding the system's storage and delivery capacities in stages, the city built Conduit 2 from Bull Run to Portland in 1911, and in 1917 constructed a small dam at the high water outlet of Bull Run Lake. In 1921, the city replaced the headworks diversion dam with a new one, about 40 feet (12 m) high, and added Conduit 3. In 1929, Portland built Dam 1 (the Ben Morrow Dam), (Note: Ben S. Morrow, for whom the dam is named, was the chief engineer of the Portland Water Bureau from 1925 to 1955. Between 1949 and 1955, he was also the bureau's general manager. Portland resident D. C. Henny, who designed the dam, later designed Hoover Dam.) which is about 200 feet (61 m) high. To keep pace with population growth and increasing water demands, the city created Reservoir 2 behind Dam 2. The new dam, completed in 1962 at the site of the headworks dam, is a rockfill structure, 110 feet (34 m) high. By that time, the city had already replaced the aging Conduit 1 with Conduit 4.

=== Hydroelectric projects ===
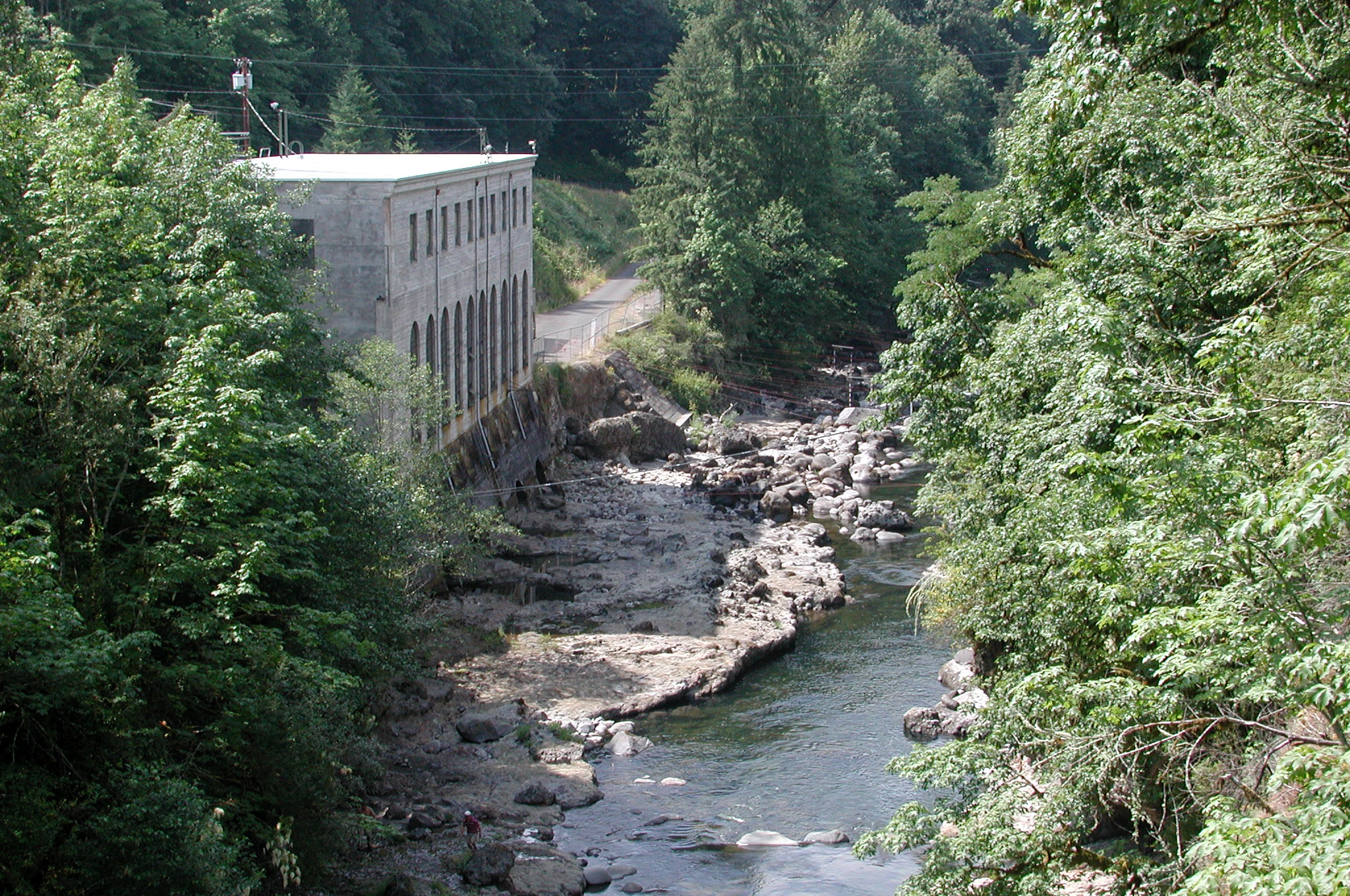
Defunct power station along the lower river

The lower Bull Run River changed dramatically in 1906, when the Mount Hood Railway and Power Company (MHR&P) began work on the Bull Run Hydroelectric Project. The project included a powerhouse on the Bull Run River at RM 1.5 (RK 2.4), and a diversion dam on one of its largest tributaries, the Little Sandy River, 1.7 miles (2.7 km) from its confluence with the Bull Run River. Water from the Little Sandy Dam diverted much of the Little Sandy's flow through a wooden flume about 3.2 miles (5.1 km) long to a 140-acre (0.57 km^{2}) reservoir called Roslyn Lake and from there to the powerhouse.

To begin the project, the MHR&P needed access to the powerhouse site. At the time, it took three hours by stagecoach to reach Bull Run from an electric railway depot in Boring. Roads in the area had to be planked to be usable during heavy rains. Access improved in mid-1911, when the company finished construction on a 22-mile (35 km) railway line between the Montavilla neighborhood in east Portland and Bull Run. In 1912, the year the powerhouse began generating electricity, the MHR&P merged with the Portland Railway, Light and Power Company, (PRL&P), which later modified the line for use by electric trolleys.

In 1913, the PRL&P, the predecessor of the electric utility company known as Portland General Electric (PGE), expanded the hydroelectric project by building Marmot Dam at RM 30 (RK 48) on the Sandy River, from which it diverted water through canals and tunnels, the longest of which was 4,690 feet (1,430 m), to the Little Sandy River upstream of the Little Sandy Dam. This increased the maximum flow along the flume to Roslyn Lake from about 200 cubic feet per second (5.7 m^{3}/s) to about 800 cubic feet per second (23 m^{3}/s). Since the combined flow entered the lower Bull Run River after leaving the powerhouse, the system altered the flows of three rivers. In 1999, close to a century after the start of the project, PGE announced that it would remove the Marmot and Little Sandy dams and related equipment and close the 22-megawatt powerhouse because of costs associated with maintenance and fish protection. Marmot Dam was demolished in 2007 and the Little Sandy Dam in 2008, restoring natural flows to the Sandy and Little Sandy.

In 1982, work on the Portland Hydroelectric Project, unrelated to the Bull Run Hydroelectric Project, began generating electricity at powerhouses below the dams at Reservoirs 1 and 2 on the Bull Run River. Portland sells the electricity from a 24-megawatt plant at Dam 1 and a 12-megawatt plant at Dam 2 to PGE, which operates and maintains the equipment. PGE, a corporation with home offices in Portland, has many other sources of electricity, which it sells to customers in a 4,000-square-mile (10,000 km^{2}) service area in the northern Willamette Valley.

=== Logging ===
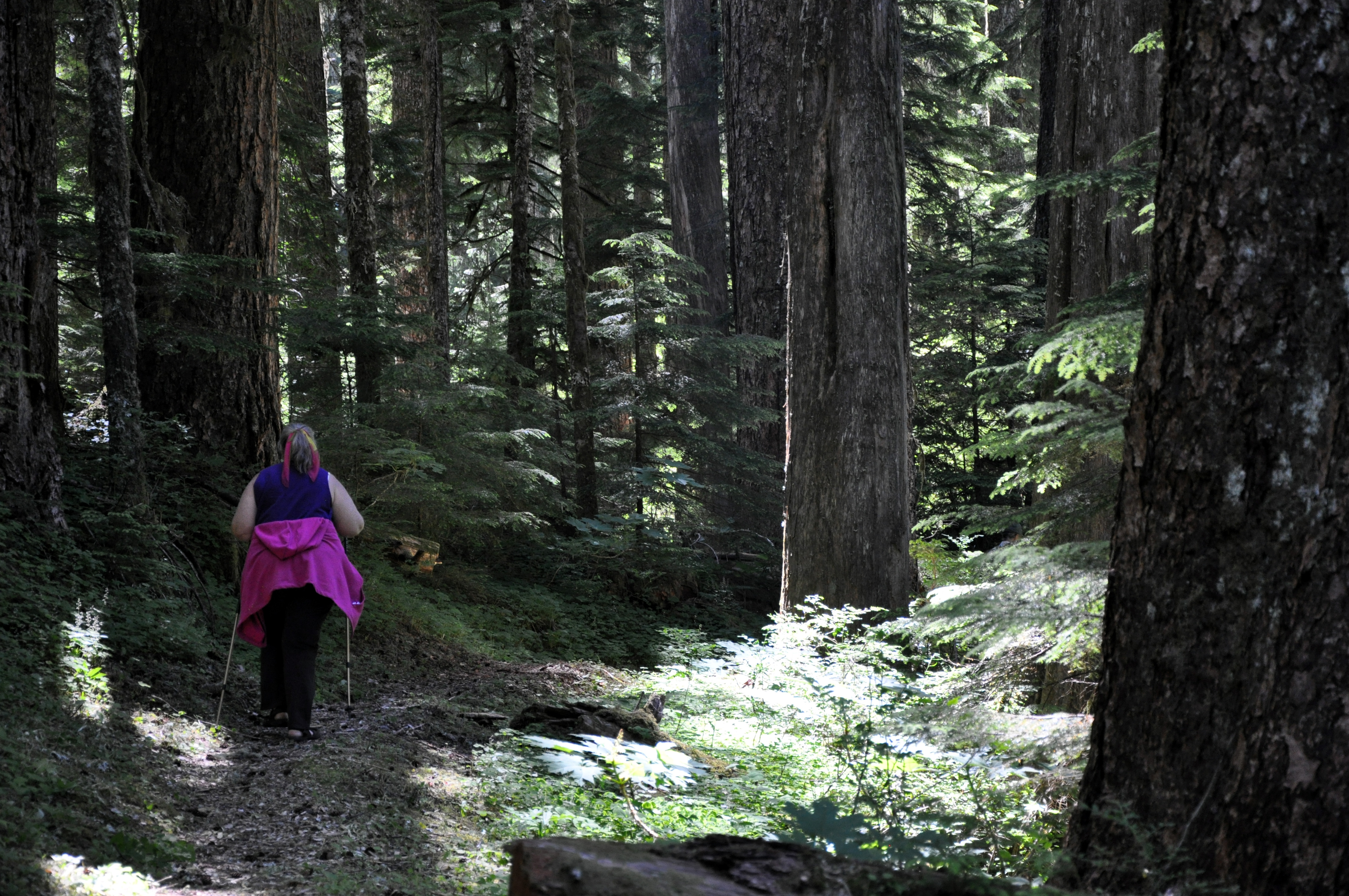
A visitor on a Portland Water Bureau tour of the watershed hikes along a forest trail near the headwaters.

Extensive timber cutting in the Sandy River basin began in the mid-19th century in response to a demand for wood from the Portland metropolitan area. Logging intensified in the lower basin through the 20th century as sawmills became established in Sandy, Boring, Brightwood and other settlements in the region, and railroad spurs extended into the forests. In 1904, President Theodore Roosevelt signed into law the Bull Run Trespass Act to forbid activities such as camping and livestock grazing in the Bull Run Reserve. Except for activity related to the waterworks, the protected area changed little until the 1950s, when the United States Forest Service began to advocate logging in the Reserve. After the U.S. Congress passed the Multiple Use – Sustained Yield Act of 1960 stressing timber production in the national forests, the Forest Service in the 1960s and 1970s built about 170 miles (270 km) of forest roads in the watershed. Before the road-building and heavy logging, "The watershed [had] remained almost inviolable for nearly 60 years, its runoff protected by a largely unbroken expanse of centuries-old trees," according to a member of the Bull Run Advisory Committee, a scientific panel commissioned by the City of Portland in 1977 to review issues related to Bull Run.

In 1973, Joseph Miller Jr., a retired Portland physician, sued the Forest Service, claiming that its logging violated the Bull Run Trespass Act. In 1976, U.S. District Judge James M. Burns agreed, and logging was halted. Shortly thereafter, Congress rescinded the Bull Run Trespass Act and replaced it with the Bull Run Watershed Management Act of 1977, which created the Bull Run Watershed Management Unit (BRWMU) (replacing the Bull Run Reserve) and legalized further Bull Run logging unless it could be shown to reduce water quality. Logging and the debate about logging continued. In 1994 about 75 percent of the BRWMU was made into a reserve for protecting the northern spotted owl and other species dependent on old-growth forests. In February 1996, runoff from unusually heavy rains in the watershed washed so much eroded soil into the Bull Run storage reservoirs that the city had to shut down the Bull Run supply and switch during the crisis to its emergency supply from a well field along the Columbia River. Later in 1996, Congress passed the Oregon Resources Conservation Act, which prohibited logging on all Forest Service lands within the Bull Run water supply drainage and another 3,500 acres (14 km^{2}) of land that drained to the lower Bull Run River. In 2001, the Little Sandy Act extended the prohibitions to the entire BRWMU and public lands along the Little Sandy River.

Between 1958 and 1993, when the last timber-cutting took place in the BRWMU, about 14,500 acres (59 km^{2}), roughly 22 percent of the water supply drainage, were logged. Since then, to reduce erosion from the outmoded logging infrastructure, the Forest Service and the water bureau have been decommissioning parts of the Bull Run forest road network, which had grown to 346 miles (557 km). By autumn 2008, they had closed 78 miles (126 km) of roads, were dismantling another 63 miles (101 km), and were removing 245 culverts.

== Watershed ==
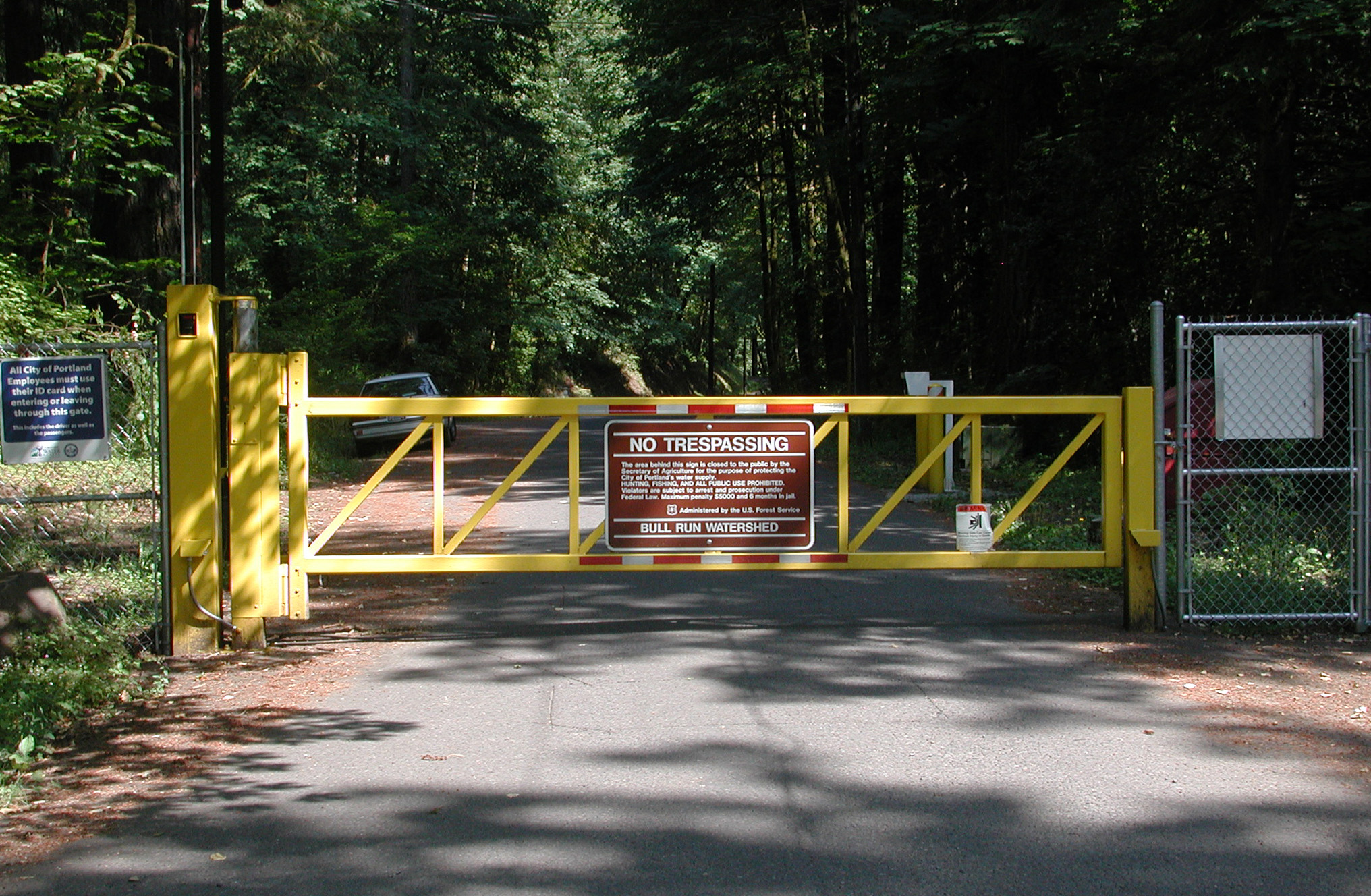
A locked gate and fence on Southeast Waterworks Road (Forest Road 10) restrict entry to the western end of the Bull Run Management Unit.

The Bull Run watershed drains 139 square miles (360 km^{2}), most of which is in the Mount Hood National Forest in Multnomah and Clackamas counties in northwest Oregon. The confluence of the Bull Run and Sandy rivers at Dodge Park, about 20 miles (32 km) east of downtown Portland, marks the watershed's western (downstream) end, while on the east it borders Hood River County, and at Hiyo Mountain it is about 6 miles (9.7 km) northwest of Mount Hood in the Cascade Range. It is a sub-watershed of the Lower Columbia–Sandy Watershed. Elevations within the watershed range from 4,750 feet (1,450 m) at Buck Peak on the watershed's northeastern boundary to 243 feet (74 m) at the mouth of the Bull Run River.

As the main source of Portland's drinking water, the watershed is largely restricted to uses related to water collection, storage, and treatment, and to forest management. The city's drinking water protection area consists of the 102 square miles (260 km^{2}) of the basin upstream of the water supply intake at RM 6.2 (RK 10). The protection area is part of a larger restricted zone, the BRWMU, which covers 143 square miles (370 km^{2}). It lies mostly within Multnomah and Clackamas counties but extends in places along its eastern edge into Hood River County. As of 2010, the Forest Service manages 95 percent of the BRWMU on land owned by the federal government; the Portland Water Bureau manages the 4 percent that is owned by the City of Portland, and the Bureau of Land Management manages the remaining 1 percent, which is on federal land. Small portions of the watershed that are along the lower main stem or along tributaries are partly outside the BRWMU and fall under other jurisdictions.

Watersheds bordering the Bull Run River drainage basin are those of the West Fork Hood River to the east and northeast, the Sandy River to the south and west, and the Columbia River to the north. Small Columbia River tributaries, each with a subwatershed bordering the Bull Run watershed, flow north from a ridge between the Bull Run and Columbia rivers. These include Eagle, Tanner, Moffett, McCord, Horsetail, Oneonta, Multnomah, and Bridle Veil creeks, which plunge over one or more waterfalls as they enter the Columbia Gorge.

=== Climate ===
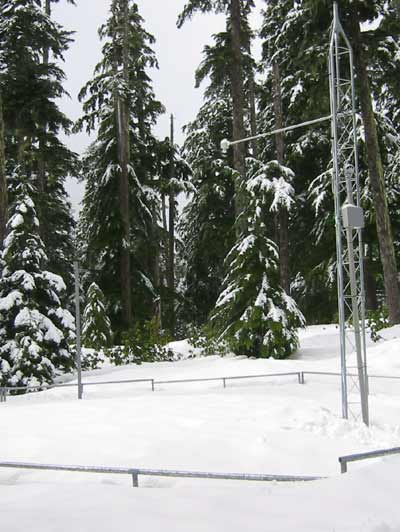
The Blazed Alder SNOTEL station in winter

The climate along the Bull Run River is typical of the western Oregon Cascades foothills. Annual precipitation ranges from 80 inches (2,000 mm) near the intake for the Portland water supply to as much as 170 inches (4,300 mm) near the headwaters. Summers are dry, and winters, especially November through January, are wet. At low elevations, most of the precipitation arrives in the form of rain, but at higher elevations 25 to 30 percent of the moisture arrives as snow. Fog drip may add significantly to total precipitation in the vicinity of Bull Run Lake. A study published in 1982 suggested that standard rain gauges placed in open areas might be underestimating the contribution of fog drip to heavily forested parts of the watershed by up to 30 percent. Accumulated snow is rare at elevations up to 2,000 feet (610 m) above sea level but sometimes reaches 6 to 10 feet (1.8 to 3.0 m) above 4,000 feet (1,200 m). Melting snow adds to streamflow in April and May, and dry soil inhibits streamflow in August. Generally, temperatures are mild. Lows in January range from just below freezing to about 25 °F (−4 °C), while July highs are usually about 80 °F (27 °C).

The Natural Resources Conservation Service (NRCS) of the United States Department of Agriculture operates snow telemetry (SNOTEL) stations at three places in the Bull Run watershed to help predict how much water will be available from melting snow. Snow depths and density vary with time and location. At the Blazed Alder Creek station, the highest of the three at 3,650 feet (1,110 m) above sea level, the mean snow-water equivalent (SWE) (the amount of water in the accumulated snow) ranged in 2009 from 0 in July–October to about 50 inches (1,300 mm) in April. A station on the North Fork at an elevation of 3,060 feet (930 m) reported a minimum mean SWE of 0 in July–October 2009 and a maximum of about 37 inches (940 mm) in April. In the same year at the South Fork station, elevation 2,690 feet (820 m), the mean SWE varied from 0 in June–September to about 10 inches (250 mm) in March.

=== Infrastructure ===
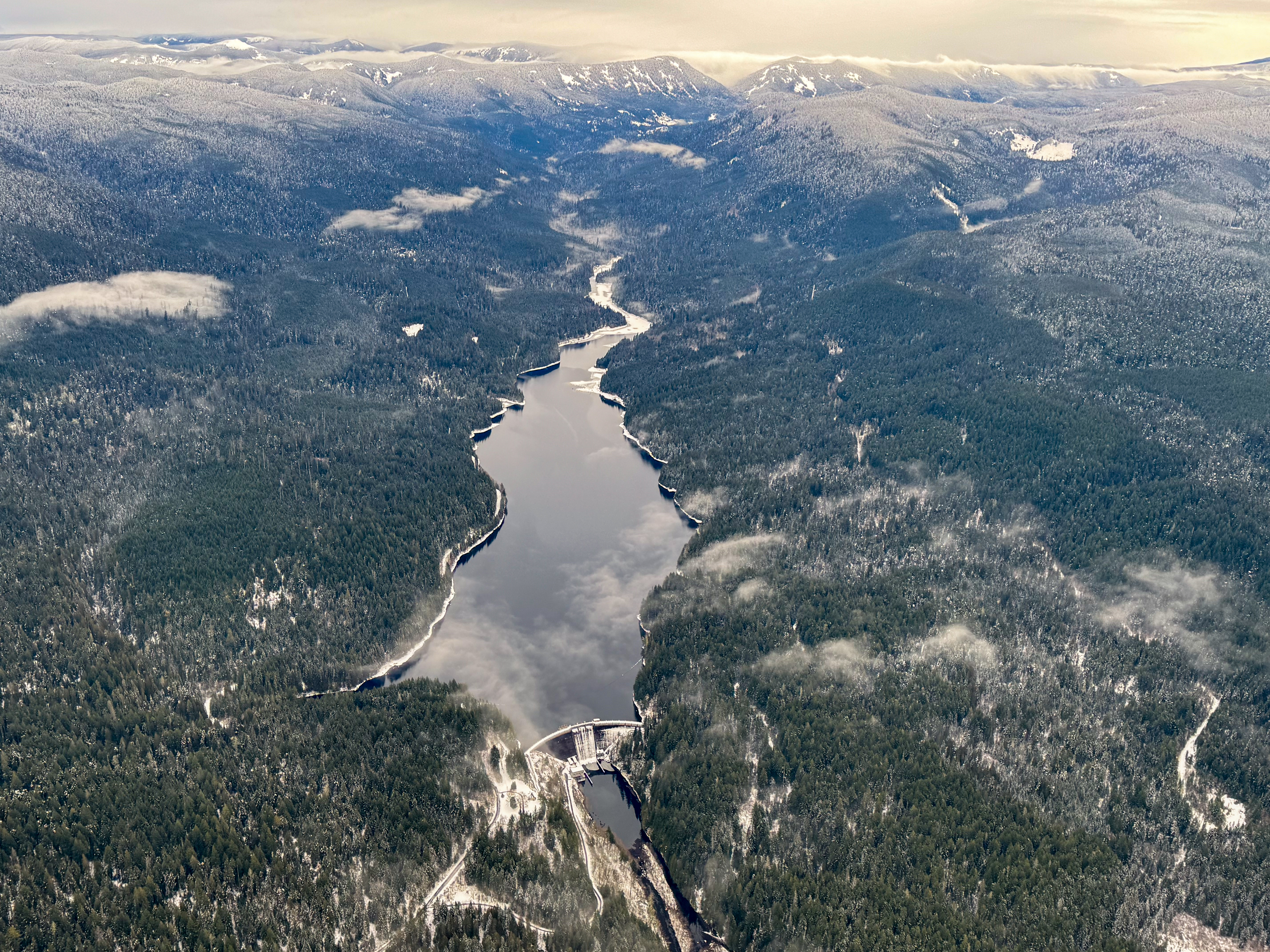
Bull Run Reservoir 1 lies behind a concrete arch-gravity dam built in 1929.

Although most of the watershed is generally closed to the public, the protected area includes forest roads, buildings, three dams and reservoirs, two hydroelectric power stations, and other infrastructure used by government employees who manage the forest and the water supply system. The system includes a concrete dam and spillway, added to the natural outlet of Bull Run Lake. The dam, completed in about 1960, was preceded in 1915 by a timber-and-rockfill structure and later by other measures to increase the lake's storage capacity and to prevent seepage. These measures raised the lake's usable storage from about 2.8 billion US gallons (11,000,000 m^{3}) to about 4.3 billion US gallons (16,000,000 m^{3}), an increase of about 55 percent. Dam 1, which impounds Reservoir 1, is a concrete arch-gravity dam about 200 feet (61 m) high, and Dam 2, a rockfill structure about 110 feet (34 m) high, impounds Reservoir 2. Although the two reservoirs combined can hold up to about 17 billion US gallons (64,000,000 m^{3}), their total usable storage is only about 10 billion US gallons (38,000,000 m^{3}).

The raw water intake (headworks) at Bull Run is just below Dam 2. This is where water is diverted from the river for chlorination and then routed into three distribution conduits for delivery to Portland. About 23 percent of the watershed's annual runoff is diverted to the city's water supply.

The main roads within the BRWMU include Forest Road 10, which runs for much of its length along the north side of the river. It links the community of Bull Run near the mouth of the river and Forest Road 18 (Lolo Pass Road) east of Bull Run Lake. Branching off Forest Road 10 downstream of Reservoir 2, Forest Roads 12 and 14 form a loop south of the river. The loop extends as far east as Goodfellow Lakes, near the source of the Little Sandy River. Below the BRWMU, Bull Run Road, open to the public, crosses the river between the community of Bull Run and Dodge Park.

The Bull Run River Bridge, a 240-foot (73 m) Pennsylvania-petit truss span that carries Bull Run Road, was originally the west truss of the Burnside Bridge over the Willamette River in downtown Portland. It includes parts made of wrought iron as well as steel, and its truss portals incorporate nautical design elements meant for Portland, an inland seaport. Built in 1894, the bridge was moved to Bull Run in 1926, when a new Burnside Bridge replaced the old one. The Sandy River Bridge over the Sandy River at Dodge Park, just upriver from the mouth of the Bull Run River, was the 300-foot (91 m) east truss of the Burnside Bridge.

=== Flora and fauna ===
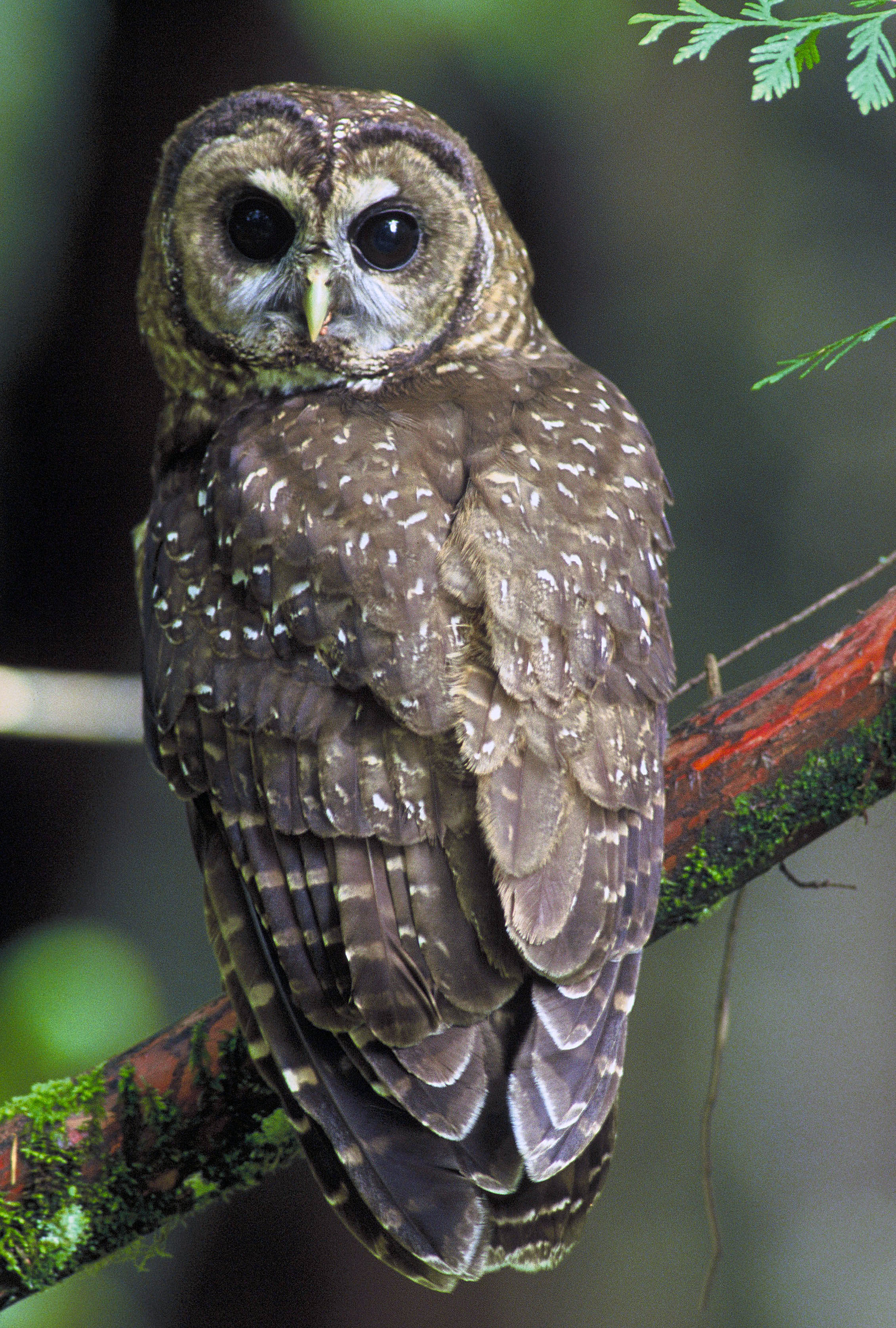
Northern spotted owl

Thick forests cover about 95 percent of the watershed. Douglas-fir is the dominant tree species in the basin below 3,400 feet (1,000 m) above sea level, where western redcedar thrives in moist areas and western hemlock also grows. Douglas-fir and noble fir are the dominant species at higher elevations, and Pacific silver fir is the climax species. Mature trees, which cover about 54 percent of the watershed, are mostly more than 500 years old and have diameters exceeding 21 inches (53 cm). Trees between 9 and 21 inches (23 and 53 cm) in diameter cover about 34 percent of the basin, while younger, smaller trees dominate the remaining 12 percent. The forest floors support many smaller plants such as salal and sword fern. About 5 percent of the watershed consists of unvegetated water bodies or bare rock and a tiny fraction of meadow.

More than 250 wildlife species, including peregrine falcon, bald eagle and northern spotted owl are thought to frequent the watershed. Migratory birds such as loons use the basin for feeding and nesting as they travel along the Pacific Flyway. Native fish species include chinook and coho salmon, steelhead, coastal cutthroat trout, Pacific lamprey, and rainbow trout, but since 1922 the headworks dam or its successor, Dam 2, have blocked anadromous fish passage to the upper river and its tributaries. Many amphibian and reptile species thrive near streams and ponds. Roosevelt elk, American black bear, coyote, cougar, black-tailed deer, North American river otter, American mink, and North American beaver are among the mammals found in the watershed.

== Recreation ==
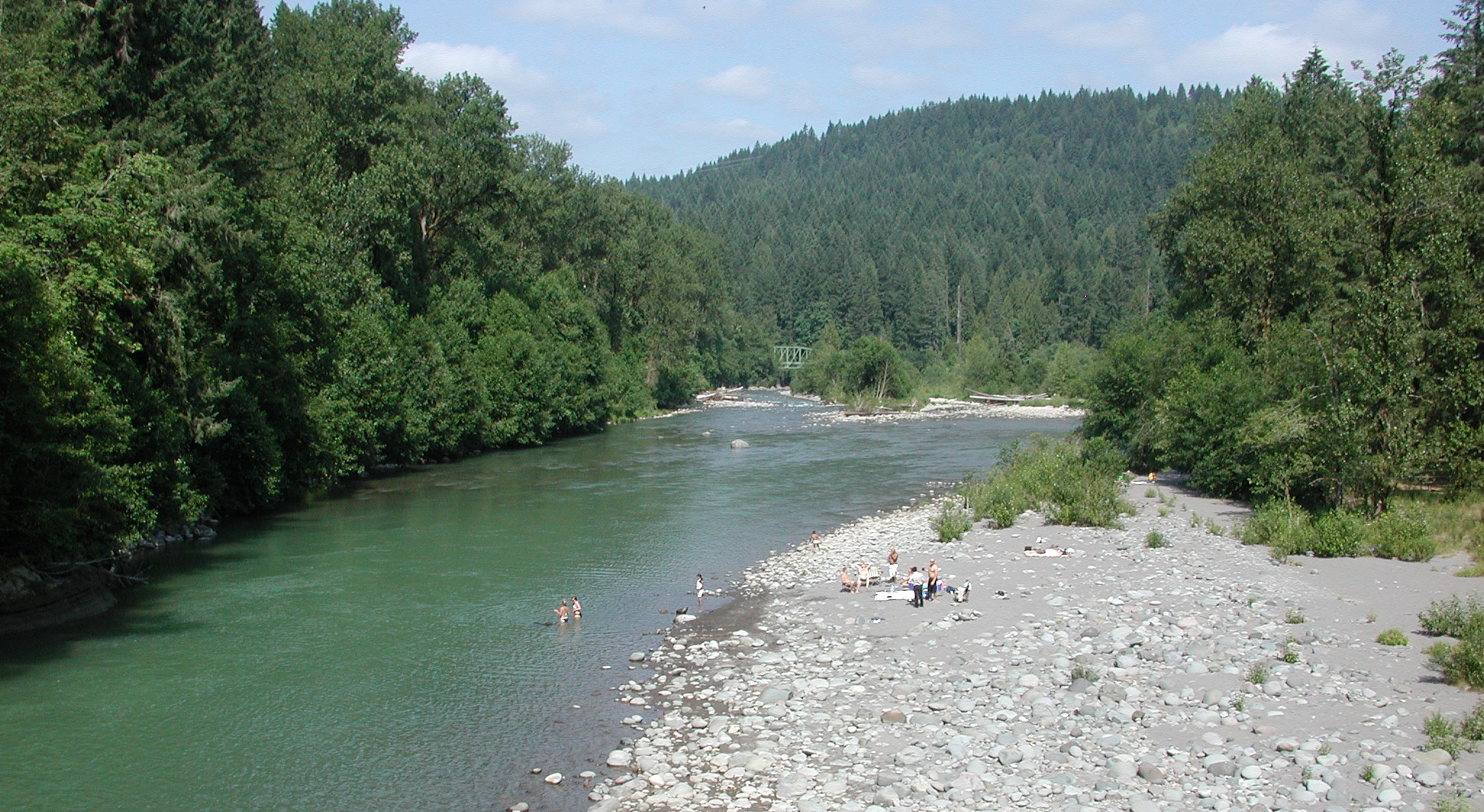
Swimming hole at Dodge Park on the Sandy River, slightly above the confluence with the Bull Run River

Adjacent to the confluence of the Bull Run and Sandy rivers, 14-acre (5.7 ha) Dodge Park offers tree-shaded picnic areas, a swimming hole, a sandy beach, and a boat ramp for launching rafts, kayaks, and drift boats on the Sandy River. The Portland Water Bureau owns and maintains the park, established in the early 20th century. Originally called Bull Run Park, it was renamed for Frank Dodge, superintendent of the water bureau from 1897 to 1914. (Note: Dodge Island, a small island in Bull Run Lake, was also named for him.) Until supplanted by automobile highways, the electric trolley to Bull Run carried passengers to and from the park until 1930. The water bureau estimates that at least 30,000 people visited the park in 1926. As of 2015, the bureau has plans to restore and improve the park as time and money allow.

Although most of the Bull Run River watershed is closed to the public, whitewater enthusiasts sometimes run the lower 2.5-mile (4.0 km) stretch from the Bull Run Road bridge to the Sandy River. The put-in place for the run is just below the powerhouse, and the take-out is at Dodge Park. The run features a permanent slalom course near the put-in, six class 3 rapids in the first 2 miles (3 km), and a short stretch of class 2 water at the end of the run.

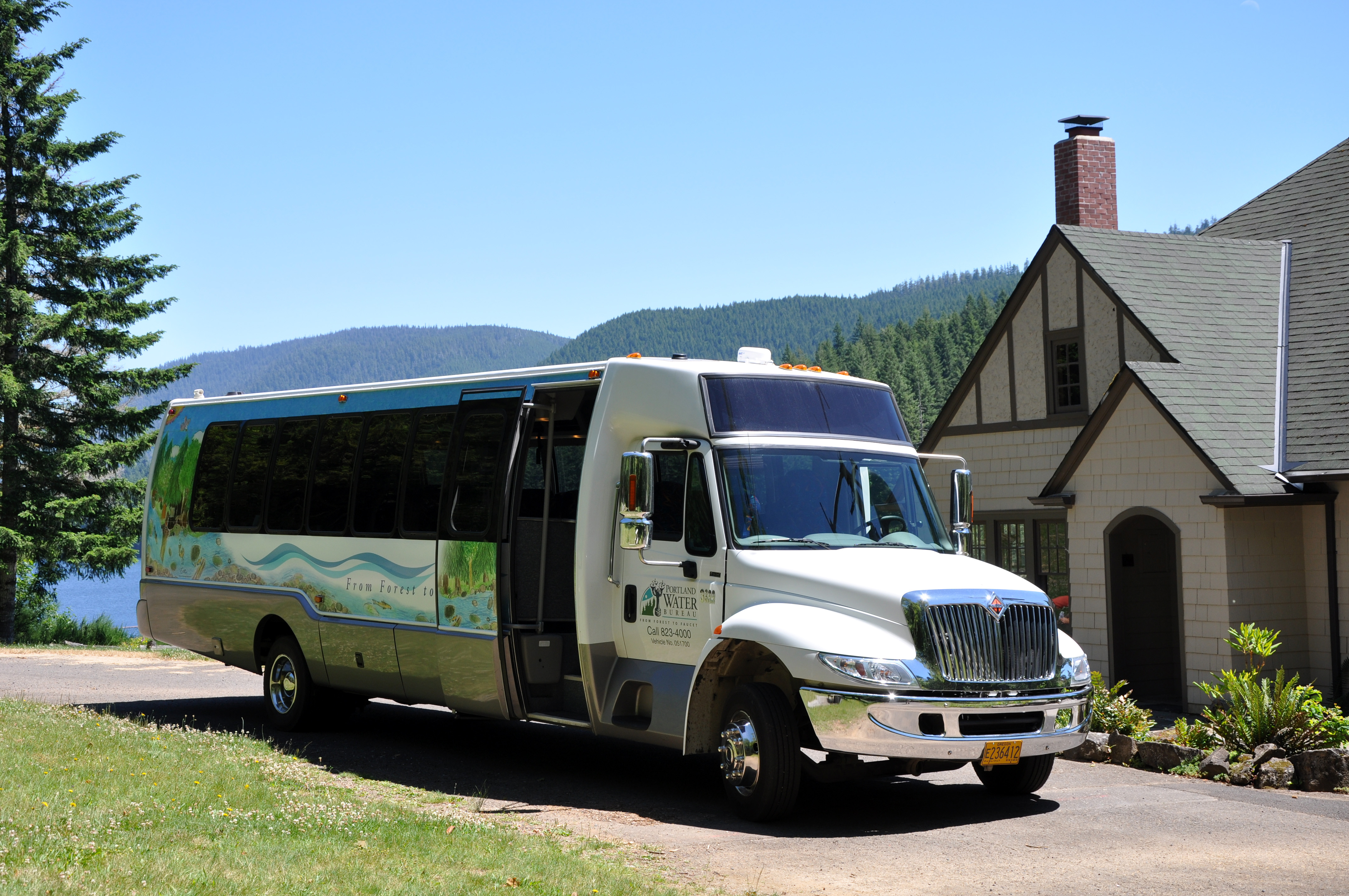
Bull Run tour bus

Fishing is limited to the lower reaches of the river. Hatchery Chinook salmon and summer and winter steelhead are sometimes caught near the confluence with the Sandy River, and catch and release fishing for wild trout is allowed from the mouth of the river to the edge of the Bull Run watershed reserve.

Access to the Bull Run Watershed Management Unit is generally limited to government employees and guests on official business, and security guards keep watch on its three gated entrances. However, the water bureau offers public tours in the summer and fall, and hikers may use the Pacific Crest Trail, which runs along the eastern edge of the watershed near Mount Hood. The bureau has been averaging about 85 group tours a year.

== See also ==
- Bull Run National Forest
- List of rivers of Oregon
- Mark O. Hatfield Memorial Trail

== Notes and references ==
Notes

=== Works cited ===
- Giordano, Pete (2004). Soggy Sneakers: A Paddler's Guide to Oregon's Rivers (4th ed.). Seattle: The Mountaineers Books. ISBN 978-0-89886-815-9.
- Johnson, Daniel M.; Petersen, Richard R.; Lycan, D. Richard; Sweet, James W.; Neuhaus, Mark E. (1985). Atlas of Oregon Lakes. Corvallis: Oregon State University Press. ISBN 0-87071-343-4.
- McArthur, Lewis A.; McArthur, Lewis L. (2003) [1928]. Oregon Geographic Names (7th ed.). Portland: Oregon Historical Society Press. ISBN 0-87595-277-1.
- Sheehan, Madelynne Diness (2005). Fishing in Oregon: The Complete Oregon Fishing Guide (10th ed.). Scappoose, Oregon: Flying Pencil Publications. ISBN 0-916473-15-5.
- Short, Casey (1983). Water: Portland's Precious Heritage. Portland, Oregon: City of Portland. OCLC 10431816.
- Smith, Dwight A.; Norman, James B.; Dykman, Pieter T. (1989) [1986]. Historic Highway Bridges of Oregon (2nd ed.). Portland: Oregon Historical Society Press. ISBN 0-87595-205-4.
- Snyder, Daniel T.; Brownell, Dorie L. (1996). "Hydrologic Setting and Preliminary Estimates of Hydrologic Components for Bull Run Lake and the Bull Run Lake Drainage Basin, Multnomah and Clackamas Counties" (PDF). Portland, Oregon: United States Geological Survey. Archived (PDF) from the original on May 19, 2015.
- Taylor, Barbara (1998). "Salmon and Steelhead Runs and Related Events of the Sandy River Basin – A Historical Perspective" (PDF). Portland, Oregon: Portland General Electric Company. Archived from the original (PDF) on May 19, 2015.
- VanRheenen, Nathan T.; Palmer, Richard N.; Hahn, Margaret A. (2011). "Evaluating Potential Climate Change Impacts on Water Resource Systems Operations: Case Studies of Portland, Oregon, and Central Valley, California". Journal of Contemporary Water Research and Education. 124 (1). Carbondale: Southern Illinois University: Universities Council on Water Resources. Archived from the original (PDF) on May 19, 2015.
- "Environmental Assessment: Bull Run Watershed Road Decommissioning" (PDF). United States Forest Service. 2006. Archived from the original (PDF) on January 16, 2009.
- Wortman, Sharon Wood; Wortman, Ed (2006). The Portland Bridge Book (3rd ed.). Portland, Oregon: Urban Adventure Press. ISBN 0-9787365-1-6.
