= Bull Run Lake =

Reservoir in Clackamas and Multnomah counties in Oregon, United States

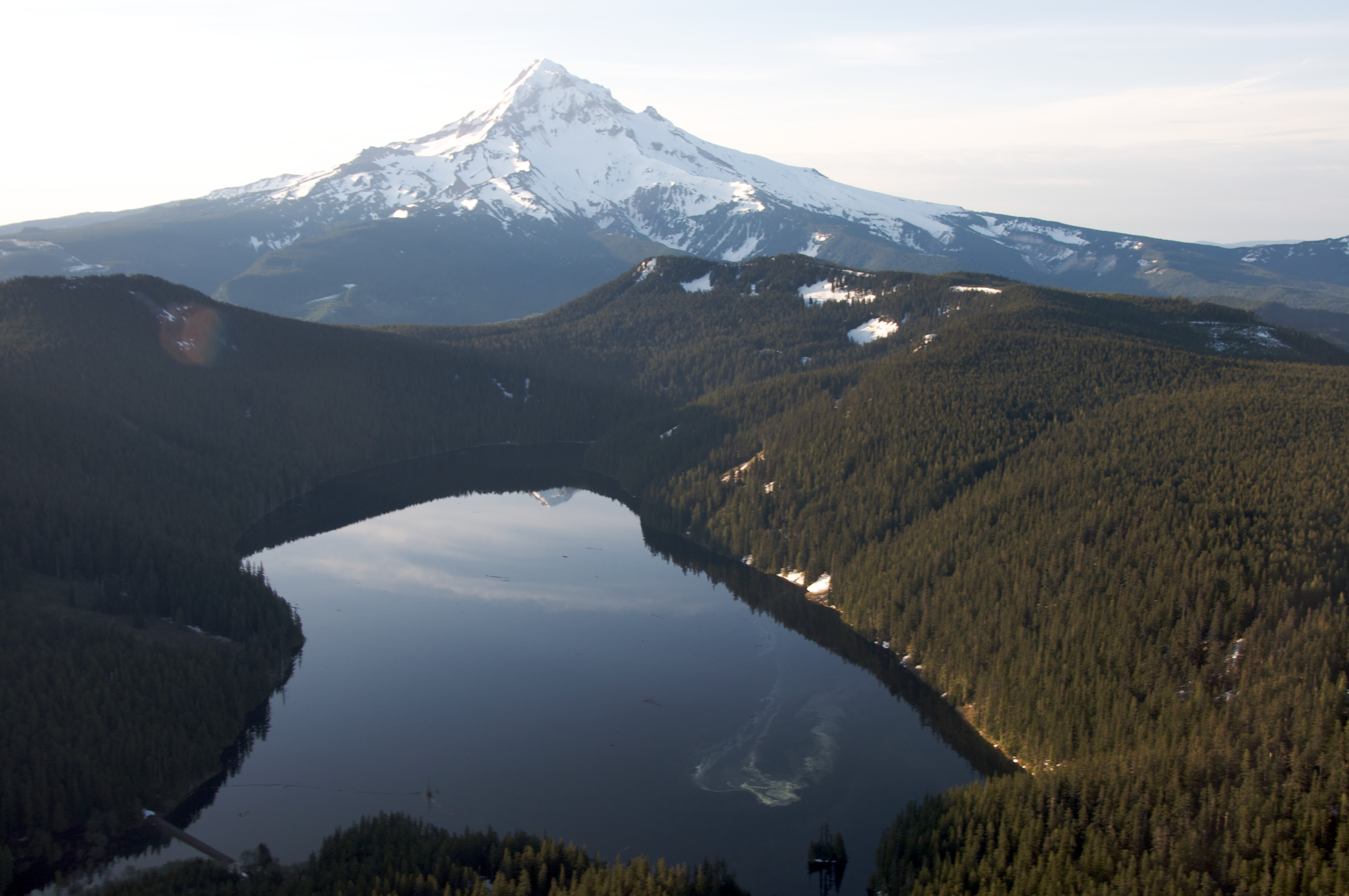
- Bull Run Lake and Mount Hood, May 2009

- Location of Bull Run Lake in Oregon, USA. Bull Run Lake (the United States)
- Location: Clackamas / Multnomah counties, Oregon, US
- Coordinates: 45°27′21″N 121°49′49″W
- Type: reservoir
- Primary inflows: Bull Run River
- Primary outflows: Bull Run River
- Catchment area: 3.5 mi^{2} (9.1 km^{2})
- Basin countries: United States
- Max. length: 1.5 mi (2.4 km)
- Max. width: 0.5 mi (0.80 km)
- Surface area: 466 acres (1.89 km^{2})
- Average depth: 66 ft (20 m)
- Max. depth: 230 ft (70 m)
- Shore length^{1}: 4.2 mi (6.8 km)
- Surface elevation: 3,162.8 feet (964.0 m) (Oct.) to 3,173.9 feet (967.4 m) (May)
- Settlements: (none)
- ^{1} Shore length is not a well-defined measure.

Bull Run Lake is a reservoir, an impoundment of the Bull Run River in Clackamas and Multnomah counties in Oregon, United States.

== Description ==
Providing part of the primary drinking water supply for Portland, Oregon, it rates highly as an oligotrophic lake, a very clean source of water. As of 1925, noted geographer Lewis A. McArthur described the lake as one of the two most important in the state (along with Crater Lake), supplying the drinking water for a third of the state's population.

The lake basin receives more than 110 inches (2,800 mm) of rain annually due to its location in the Cascade Range, about 9 miles (14 km) west of Mount Hood. Public access to the area has been controlled since June 17, 1892, with the creation of the Bull Run Reserve by President Benjamin Harrison. Water from the reservoir first flowed into the Portland water system on January 2, 1895. President Theodore Roosevelt restricted entry to all but government agents and water company employees and banned stock grazing on April 28, 1904.

In 1915 a new timber and rock fill dam raised the lake level about 10 feet (3.0 m). At least two series of efforts were made between 1917 and 1925 to decrease lake seepage. In 1961 additional areas of seepage were sealed with clay, and the outlet dam was remodeled to contain gates at elevations of 3,147 feet (959 m) and 3,158 feet (963 m).

In 1994, concerns of outflow water temperature and its effect on fish populations led to regular careful measurements of the lake's thermocline characteristics and the inlet water temperature. Concrete pier blocks were installed to minimize the effect of water temperature shock on downstream aquatic life.

== See also ==
- List of lakes in Oregon
