= James B. Norman =

American photographer

- Born: 1952 (age 73–74)
- Known for: Photography

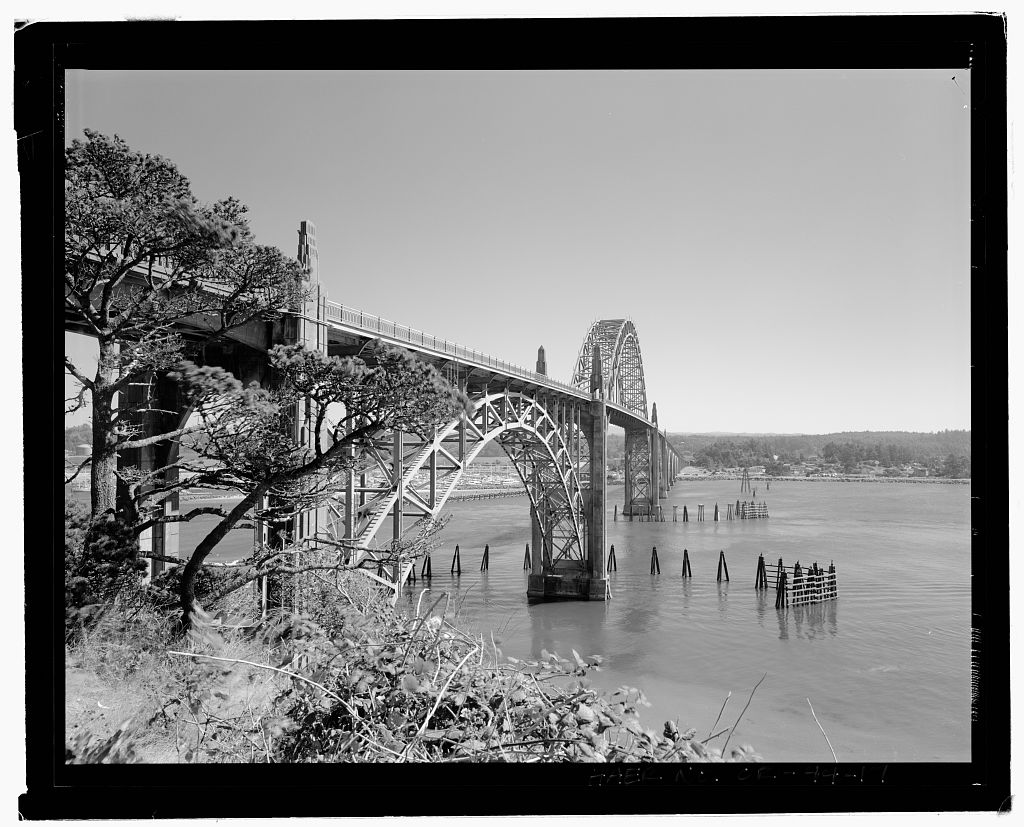
Yaquina Bay Bridge in Newport, Oregon, photographed for HAER by James B Norman

James Burton Norman Jr. (born 1952) is an American photographer, author, and cultural historian.

== Career ==
As an architectural photographer, he has documented more than 200 of Oregon's historic architectural and engineering resources for the Historic American Engineering Record (HAER) and the Historic American Buildings Survey (HABS), and was the Project Photographer for the 1999 HAER Willamette River Bridges Recordation Project sponsored by the National Park Service, and for the National Historic Landmark nomination for the Oregon Coast Bridges of Conde B. McCullough.

Norman has authored, photographed, and produced several books on Oregon's architectural and engineering heritage (see List of Works below).

Norman's documentary photography has been widely published, and is included in the permanent collections of the Library of Congress, the Historic American Buildings Survey (HABS), the Historic American Engineering Record (HAER), the National Register of Historic Places, the President’s Advisory Council on Historic Preservation, the National Trust for Historic Preservation, the National Park Service, the Smithsonian Institution and the Oregon Historical Society.

His fine art photography is included in the permanent collections of the Portland Art Museum and the Seattle Art Museum.

== Personal life ==
Originally from Shreveport, Louisiana, Mr. Norman obtained his Bachelors of Science from Louisiana State University, and currently resides in Salem, Oregon.

== List of works ==
- Historic Highway Bridges of Oregon (Oregon Department of Transportation (ODOT) 1985, Oregon Historical Society (OHS) 1989 (2nd ed). A survey of historic bridges in the state of Oregon, co-authored with Dwight A. Smith, and Pieter T. Dykman.
- Portland's Architectural Heritage (OHS 1991). A survey of the National Register listed properties in and around Portland, Oregon.
- Oregon Covered Bridges: A Study for the 1989–90 Oregon Legislature (ODOT 1988). This legislative study was responsible for the creation of the first comprehensive covered bridge preservation program in the nation.
- Oregon Main Street: A Rephotographic Survey (OHS 1994).
- The Portland Bridge Book, (Urban Adventures Press, 3rd ed, 2006) by Sharon Wood Wortman. The Portland Bridge Book, 3rd ed., received a Silver Award for Regional Best Non-fiction in 2007 from the Independent Publisher Book Awards (IPPY)
- Oregon Coast Bridges (North Left Coast Press, 2011) by Ray A. Allen.
