= Isaac W. Smith (surveyor) =

American surveyor (1826–1897)

- photographed c. 1890
- Born: Isaac Williams Smith; February 15, 1826; Fredericksburg, Virginia, U.S.
- Died: January 1, 1897 (aged 70); Portland, Oregon, U.S.
- Resting place: River View Cemetery, Portland, Oregon
- Relatives: George Hugh Smith (brother)
- Military career
- Allegiance: United States; Confederate States
- Branch: United States Army; Confederate States Army
- Service years: 1847–1848; 1861–1865
- Rank: Second Lieutenant; Captain
- Units: Voltigeur Regiment; Corps of Engineers
- Conflicts: Mexican-American War; American Civil War

Isaac W. Smith (born Isaac Williams Smith; February 15, 1826 – January 1, 1897) was an American surveyor and civil engineer. He also served as an engineer officer in the Confederate States Army during the American Civil War.

== Early life and education ==
Smith was born February 15, 1826, in Fredericksburg, Virginia, the son of Rev. George A. and Ophelia Williams Smith. He attended the Fairfax Institute at Clairens and the Virginia Military Institute at Lexington, graduating in 1846. One of his professors was Thomas Stonewall Jackson. After graduation Smith served as assistant surveyor on many projects, including under Captain Emory on the survey of the northeastern boundary between the United States and Canada.

== Mexican-American War ==
In 1847, Smith was appointed a Second Lieutenant in Company K of the U.S. Regiment of Voltigeurs during the Mexican-American War, and fought at Veracruz.

== Early career ==
After his discharge from the Army, Smith returned to surveying and became assistant surveyor and astronomer on the survey of the parallel between the Creek and Cherokee nations of Native Americans under lieutenants Sitgreaves and Woodruff. He was also assistant astronomer and first assistant surveyor of the parallel between the states of Iowa and Minnesota, and resident surveyor and engineer for the construction of the Orange and Alexandria Railroad, Virginia. In 1854 Smith was assistant engineer on the Pacific Railroad surveys and explorations along the southern route of a proposed transcontinental railway route under U.S. Engineer lieutenants Williamson and Parke.

Smith moved to Washington Territory in 1855 where he supervised the building of various lighthouses along the Pacific coast and Strait of Juan de Fuca. This work was accomplished, in his own words, "with considerably difficulty and peril, journeys to and from the works being made either in small rowboats or Indian canoes through water that were of a very treacherous character and often with only Indians for crew". In 1858, Smith was appointed Lighthouse Agent for Washington Territory. In 1859 he surveyed the Puget Sound Guide Meridian from the area just north of Seattle to within feet of the international boundary with British Columbia. Smith was appointed chief registrar of the United States General Land Office in Seattle in 1860 and was an aide-de-camp to Governor Isaac Stevens.

== American Civil War ==
During the American Civil War, when the Union Army invaded his home state, Smith had to flee north to British Columbia because of his well-known Southern sympathies. He returned to Virginia in 1862 by way of steamer to Baltimore, Maryland, and then on to Richmond. Smith enlisted in the Confederate States Army and was appointed Captain in the Engineer Corps of the Army of Northern Virginia in charge of the Confederate pontoon service. He was instrumental in the defense of Petersburg and Richmond during the Siege of Petersburg, and was present at the surrender of Confederate forces at Appomattox Court House. Smith returned home with "an old gray uniform, much tattered and worn, a good horse and a large amount of experience."

== Later career ==
After the war, Smith went to Mexico where he served as district engineer on the Imperial Mexican Railroad from Veracruz to Mexico City. He returned to the Pacific Coast in 1869 and worked as surveyor and engineer on various railroad surveys in California, Oregon and the Northern Pacific Railroad in Washington. He built the canals and locks around Willamette Falls in Oregon City in 1871–72.

In December 1873, Smith platted gas and water lines for the city of Tacoma, Washington. He then worked in British Columbia in the employ of the Dominion Government where he conducted a survey of the Fraser River from Soda Creek to Lytton to examine the feasibility of steamship travel. From 1876 to 1878 he served on the Board of Railroad Commissioners for the State of California, and was appointed chief engineer of the Sacramento River Drainage Commission. In 1880 he served as chief engineer of the Board of State Harbor Commissioners of California.

Smith then returned to Washington in the employ of the Northern Pacific Railroad and was put in charge of surveys through the Cascade Range to find the most practical route across to Tacoma. The route adopted was through "Stampede Pass", one of the lines Smith surveyed and mapped.

== "Father" of Portland Oregon's water system ==
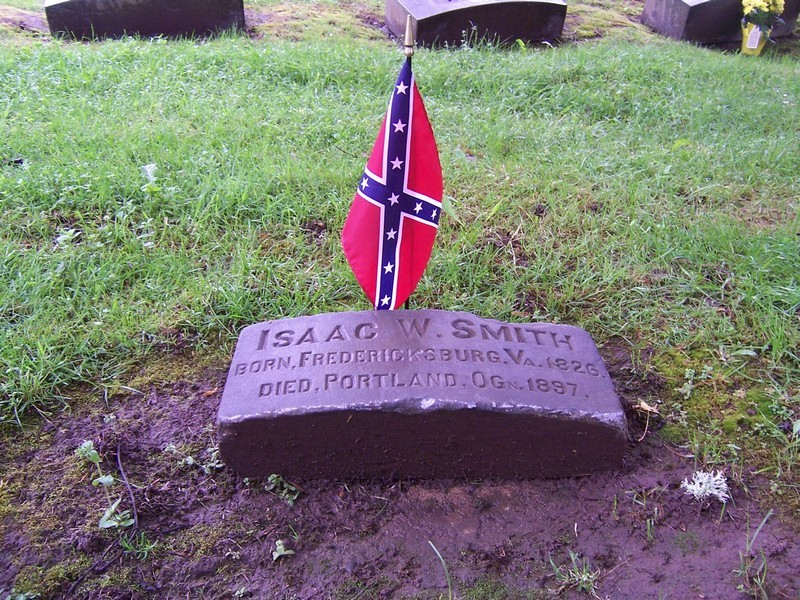
Grave of Isaac Williams Smith

From 1885 to 1897 Smith was Chief Engineer for the City of Portland, Oregon, Water Works. In January, 1886, at the request of the Portland Water Committee, Isaac Smith led a survey to discover a new water source for Portland. He designed and supervised the building of the 24-mile (39 km) pipeline from the newly surveyed Bull Run Reservoir to Portland, from which the city still gets its drinking water. For several months the survey party fought through country described by another member of the survey team as "rugged wilderness, unsurveyed and unknown. The only trails are those of elk, deer, etc. There is not a trace of civilization in any direction."

== Death ==
"The Colonel", as he was called, was extremely dedicated to his work. He took to his bed on Christmas Day 1896 with pneumonia. Over the next three days he suffered bouts of chills and fever. His last words before death were, "How is the wingdam in the Sandy River getting along? I hope the cost of it will not exceed the estimate of $600. I would not like to have the cost exceed the estimate." Isaac Williams Smith never married and died of pneumonia in Portland on January 1, 1897.

His obituary in The Oregonian called this devotion to duty his "sterling and unapproachable integrity…his great but unostentatious love for all created things." It went on to state that Isaac Smith was "one of nature's noblemen, a man of lofty nature, who could not stoop to give place in his large and generous heart to anything that partook of the small and petty in act or sentiment. His life was colored strongly by his sense of duty, his sterling and unapproachable integrity…"

Smith is buried in a very plain grave in section three of River View Cemetery, in the Teal family plot.

== Legacy ==
Camp No. 458 (established 2003) of the Sons of Confederate Veterans in Portland, Oregon, is named after him.
