= Portland Water Bureau =

Municipal agency in Portland, Oregon

Agency overview
- Jurisdiction: Portland, Oregon
- Agency executives: Priya Dhanapal, Deputy City Administrator for Public Works; Edward Campbell, Interim Director
- Parent Service Area: Public Works
- Website: www.portland.gov/water

The Portland Water Bureau is the municipal water department for the city of Portland in the U.S. state of Oregon. Its service district includes 225 miles within the Portland metropolitan area. The bureau manages a water supply that comes mainly from the Bull Run River in the foothills of the Cascade Range east of the city and secondarily from the Columbia South Shore Well Field near the Columbia River.

A city charter reform, passed by Portland voters in 2022, moved leadership of city bureaus out of the portfolios of city commissioners. The last commissioner to oversee this bureau was Mingus Mapps in 2024. As of 2025, the bureau is under the umbrella of the Public Works Service Area, headed by Deputy City Administrator for Public Works Priya Dhanapal. The interim director is Edward Campbell.

As of 2025, the city is moving to merge the Portland Water Bureau with Portland Environmental Services in an initiative called "One Water".

The Willamette River Crossing Project, which would replace piping that brings water to the West side of the city, is set to begin in 2027–2028. Prior to the replacement, this piping remains vulnerable to breakages in the case of an earthquake.

Budgeted departmental revenues for fiscal year 2015–16 included about $157 million for charges for services.

== History ==
=== Sources private and public ===
In 1843 or 1844, William Overton and Asa Lovejoy, while traveling by canoe from Fort Vancouver to Oregon City, stopped to rest on the west bank of the Willamette River and agreed it would be a good place for a town. Laying claim to 640 acres (260 ha) of riverfront land, they founded what in 1851 became the incorporated city of Portland. Relying entirely on water from wells until the mid-1850s, Portland residents became concerned when polluted drainage from the city's growing number of houses began to contaminate the wells. In 1856, Pioneer Water Works, a private company, got permission from Portland's government to pipe water from Caruthers Creek to some of these homes. (Note: Caruthers Creek flowed east into the Willamette River down a ravine known as Marquam Gulch, near the modern site of Oregon Health Sciences University in southwest Portland. By the mid-1880s, the company, re-named the Portland Water Company, abandoned the creek, which city growth had overrun and polluted.) Twice changing hands and becoming the Portland Water Company, the business added new pipes and pumps to obtain water from Balch Creek and the Willamette River, but failed to meet ever-increasing demand for clean water. Based on water-quality surveys and engineering studies, the Portland Fire and Water Committee recommended in 1872 that the City build its own water system. To issue bonds to finance the project, it needed state approval.

The Oregon Legislature denied approval until 1884–85, when waste from upstream factories and towns—as well as Portland's own waste, returned to Portland by tidal fluctuations on the Willamette—caused another pollution crisis. In the face of public protests about dirty water, the legislature relented, and the Portland Water Committee began work on a municipal system in 1885. The Water Committee was also created because of the political rivalry between Joseph Simon and John H. Mitchell. Simon was attempting to isolate the power of the Mitchell faction.

The 15-member committee was made up of the most prominent businessmen in Portland, (Note: The 15 members of the Portland Water Committee were John Gates, F.C. Smith, C.H. Lewis, Henry Failing, William S. Ladd, Frank Dekum, L. Fleishner, Henry W. Corbett, W.L.K. Smith, J. Loewenburg, Simeon Gannett Reed, R.B. Knapp, L. Therkelson, Thomas M. Richardson, and A.H. Johnson) and was led by Henry Failing. It was derisively named the "Oligarchy of 15" by a 6-1 vote of the Portland City Council. While Failing was the official leader through 1897, "William S. Ladd was the dominant spirit", and meetings were always held at his Ladd & Tilton Bank. Ladd also supplied an initial $20,000 needed for the system.

The committee bought the infrastructure of the Portland Water Company in 1886 and began a search for a superior water source, which led them to the Bull Run Watershed in 1887. A committee meeting in early 1887 selected Bull Run with only Simeon Reed opposing the development, who favored continuing to use the Willamette.

Isaac W. Smith an engineer and surveyor, was commissioned to inspect any viable water supply in the region. After considering options including Oswego Lake and the Clackamas River, Smith settled on the Bull Run River as the most likely prospect. A five-month survey trip led Smith to conclude that a gravity-flow system could deliver clean water from the river to Portland. The committee and Judge Matthew Deady drafted a bill to finance the $500,000 cost. It was vetoed by Governor Sylvester Pennoyer in early 1889, which led Deady to state "in view of his impracticable, cranky nature and conduct he ought to be called Sylpester Annoyer."

Most landowners along the Bull Run stream agreed to sell their rights for nominal fees. One exception was a civil engineer who, based on his own investigations, had bought land and water rights along the river in hopes of re-selling them to the city. After much negotiating, he relinquished his rights in 1888. In 1891, the Oregon Legislature authorized the city to sell bonds to pay for the Bull Run project, which began delivering water to Portland in 1895.

When the Bull Run water first arrived in Portland in January 1895, Pennoyer was asked to give a toast. "After tasting his glass of Bull Run water he commented that it had neither body nor flavor; he much preferred the old Willamette".

=== Protecting the supply ===
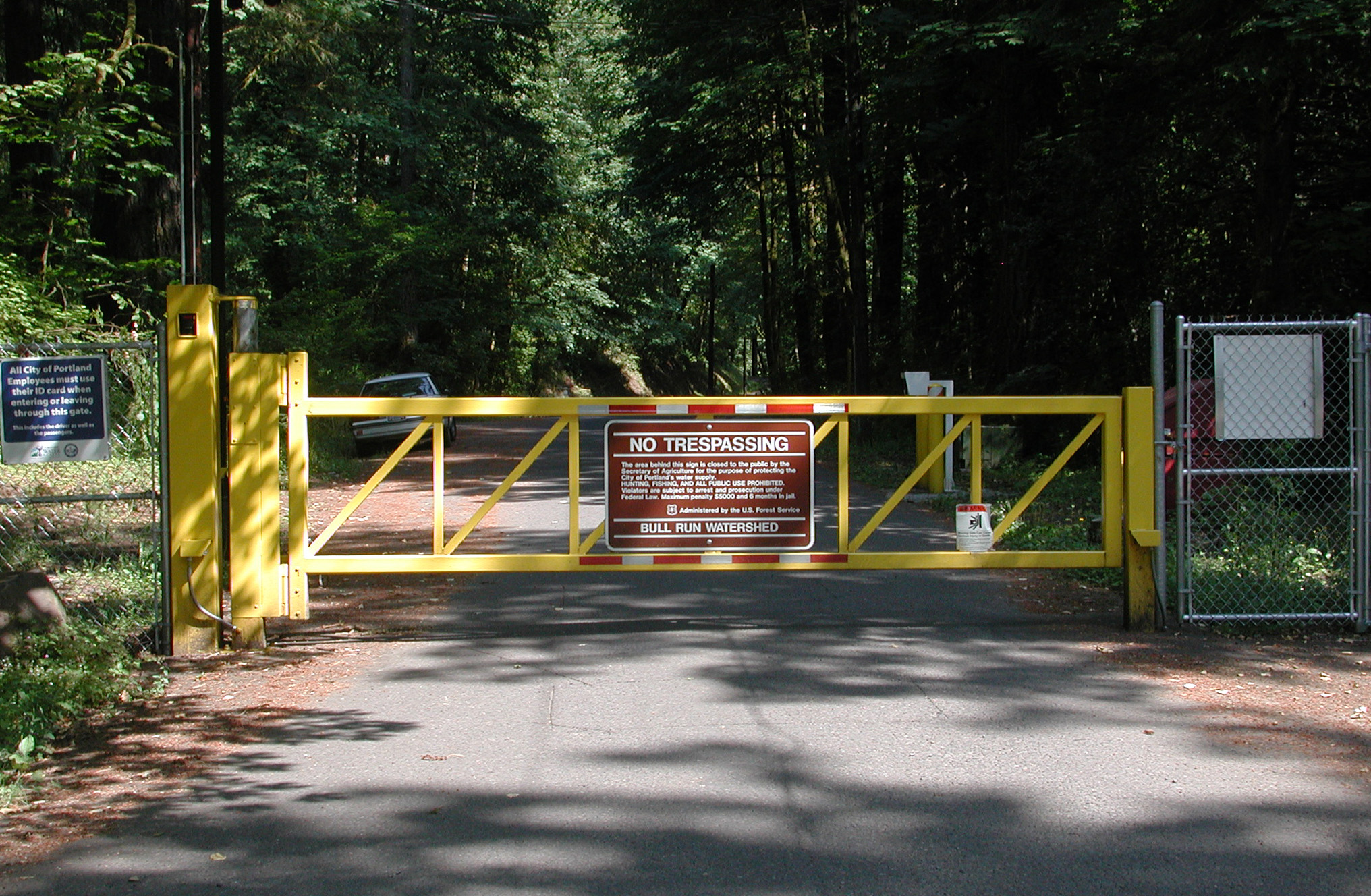
A locked gate and fence on Southeast Waterworks Road (National Forest Development Road 10) restrict entry to the western end of the Bull Run Management Unit.

To protect the water supply from contamination, the committee sought federal help in reducing logging and tree-clearing in the watershed. In 1892, President Benjamin Harrison, using powers granted to him by the Forest Reserve Act of 1891, established the Bull Run Forest Reserve, later included in the Bull Run National Forest. This law prohibited settlement in the 142,000-acre (570 km^{2}) reserve and made it easier for the committee to acquire private land and water rights in the basin.

Despite the new restrictions, fishing, hunting, camping, and cattle and sheep grazing were still allowed. The committee sought further restrictions, and in 1904, President Theodore Roosevelt signed into law the Bull Run Trespass Act to further protect the reserve and the water. Over the next half-century, the Portland Water Board, the committee's successor, added diversion structures, storage reservoirs, treatment equipment, and water conduits to the original system. However, by the mid-1950s, the City of Portland and the United States Forest Service began to strongly disagree about logging in and public access to the watershed. In 1959, the Forest Service opened 42,500 acres (172 km^{2}) to recreation, and in 1960 Congress passed the Multiple-Use – Sustained Yield Act that, among other things, stressed timber production in the national forests. Between the late 1950s and 1976, the Forest Service allowed about 8,700 acres (35 km^{2}) to be logged in the reserve.

Ruling on a citizen lawsuit, Miller v. Mallery, Judge James M. Burns agreed in 1976 that logging in the reserve violated the Trespass Act of 1904. He ordered that further recreation, logging, and hydropower development cease in the reserve. Because it wanted to develop hydropower along the Bull Run River, the City of Portland sought revised legislation. U.S. Representative Robert B. Duncan and U.S. Senator Mark Hatfield introduced such legislation, which led in 1977 to passage of the Bull Run Watershed Management Act. It established the Bull Run Watershed Management Unit (BRWMU) and removed Portland's control over the fraction of the reserve that had been opened to recreation in 1959. Although the new law allowed hydropower production within the BRWMU, the unit's main purpose was to produce pure drinking water for the City of Portland and other entities in the Portland metropolitan area. Shortly thereafter, the City built the Portland Hydroelectric Project, which included two powerhouses and a transmission line. Logging did not immediately cease in the unit because the new law allowed activities unless they could be shown to reduce water quality. While the City and the Forest Service worked on water-quality standards, logging continued on a smaller scale, including a 1983 operation to salvage about 1,700 acres (6.9 km^{2}) of trees downed by a windstorm. Between 1958 and 1993, when all timber-cutting operations ceased in the BRWMU, about 14,500 acres (59 km^{2}), roughly 22 percent of the water-supply drainage, had been logged.

Subsequent legislation affecting the watershed included federal designation in 1994 of about 75 percent of the BRWMU as a reserve for protecting the Northern Spotted Owl and other species dependent on old-growth forests. This designation further restricted logging. In 1996, the Oregon Resources Conservation Act generally prohibited logging on all Forest Service lands within the Bull Run water-supply drainage and another 3,500 acres (14 km^{2}) of land that drained to the lower Bull Run River. In 2001, President George W. Bush signed the Little Sandy Act, which extended the prohibitions to the entire BRWMU and expanded it to include public lands along the Little Sandy River, a tributary of the Bull Run River. In addition, the Safe Drinking Water Act, the Clean Water Act, the Northwest Forest Plan, and the Endangered Species Act all regulate the unit.

Although the BRWMU is generally closed to the public, the Portland Water Bureau offers tours of the watershed, usually in the summer or fall. In addition, the Pacific Crest Trail, heavily used for hiking, crosses the watershed along the eastern boundary of the management unit.

=== Corruption and graft ===
The Portland Water Bureau was always rumored to be managed by corrupt city commissioners. By 1913 it had what E. Kimbark MacColl referred to, tongue in cheek, as a "giant leak". The bureau sold its water unmetered and gave much away, such as to Henry Pittock, who not only received free water but also a pipe to his hillside Pittock Mansion.

Portland City Council commissioner Will Daly instituted much reform from 1911 to 1917, including the unmetered water and free supply. However, as Mayor Baker reigned (1917–1933), Commissioner John Mann returned to the previously corrupt practices. One clerk stole an estimated $20,000 during the 1920s. Mann and Baker's mortgages were paid off by unnamed benefactors; Mann drove a luxury car paid for by the Water Bureau, and had a private resort in the Bull Run watershed, built by bureau employees. Mann "ran the bureau like a dictator". Henry Gross and a local Reverend Johannsen began the effort to recall Mann and Baker, primarily over the highly indebted Water Bureau. A grand jury indicted Mann, though charges were dropped in 1931 by a new district attorney, Lotus Langley. By then, Mann, Mayor Baker, and Earl Riley were embroiled in accepting bribes for locating the Portland Public Market. Johannsen and Gross began a recall effort against Mann, Baker, Riley, and Langley.

After Governor Julius Meier sent forensic accountant Frank Akin to find corruption at the Port of Portland, Akin turned to the Water Bureau. Akin was murdered the day before he was slated to present Port evidence to the Oregon state legislature, when he was only a month into his Water Bureau investigation. Many rumors swirled around Akin's death, and his report on the water bureau disappeared. Commissioner Jake Bennett was documented to have the only other copy of it; a year later, he claimed to have returned it to the auditor's office, which The Oregonian dutifully reported.

== Infrastructure ==
=== Bull Run Lake to headworks ===
One large natural lake, two artificial reservoirs, and the Bull Run River and its tributaries lie within the watershed. Seasonal precipitation produces streamflows that vary from up to 13 billion gallons (49,000,000 m^{3}) per day to as low as 30 million gallons (110,000 m^{3}) per day.

Bull Run Lake, the highest lake in the watershed, is natural. When it is full, its surface is at 3,174 to 3,178 feet (967.4 to 968.7 m) above sea level. Water from the lake seeps through the ground into the river at a rate of 20 to 25 million gallons (76,000 to 95,000 m^{3}) a day and flows into artificial reservoirs at two points further downstream. The Portland Water Bureau built Dam 1, a concrete arch-gravity dam, in 1929 to create Reservoir 1, also known as Ben Morrow Lake. The larger of the two reservoirs, it holds a maximum of 9.9 billion gallons (37 million m^{3}). In 1962, the bureau finished Dam 2, an earthfill dam with a maximum storage capacity of 6.8 billion gallons (26 million m^{3}). Although the two reservoirs combined can hold up to about 17 billion gallons (64 million m^{3}), the total usable storage is about 10 billion gallons (38 million m^{3}).

The raw water intake (headworks) at Bull Run is located just below Dam 2, at river mile (RM) 6.2 or river kilometer (RK) 10.0. This is where water is diverted from the river for chlorination and then routed into distribution conduits for delivery to Portland. The average rate of the water flow at the headworks is about 773 cubic feet per second (21.9 m^{3}/s). About 23 percent of the watershed's annual runoff is diverted to the city's water supply.

=== Headworks to water taps ===
Starting at an elevation of about 860 feet (260 m) above sea level, Bull Run water flows by gravity from the headworks through three large pipes to an underground reservoir at Powell Butte Nature Park in east Portland. The pipes, above ground in places, are vulnerable to landslides, falling trees, earthquakes, and other hazards. In 2006, the Federal Emergency Management Agency (FEMA) granted $3 million to the city for seismic upgrades to pipes where they cross trestles above streams.

The Powell Butte underground reservoir, first used in 1981, is near the intersection of Southeast 158th Avenue and Southeast Powell Boulevard in southeast Portland. The reservoir, with a capacity of 50 million gallons (190,000 m^{3}), has an overflow elevation of about 530 feet (160 m) above sea level. During droughts or emergencies, water can be pumped about 4.5 miles (7.2 km) from city-owned wells near the Columbia River to Powell Butte, where it mixes with Bull Run water. From Powell Butte, water can flow by gravity to places as far away as parts of Washington County, west of Portland. The Washington County Supply Line, 14 miles (23 km) long, can deliver up to 60 million gallons (230,000 m^{3}) a day to customers in Tualatin, the Tualatin Valley and Raleigh Hills. Overall, the City of Portland provides water to residents of Portland and 19 suburban cities and water districts comprising nearly 25 percent of the Oregon population.

In addition to the reservoir at Powell Butte, as of 2009 the city of Portland has five large open drinking water reservoirs and an underground reservoir in two city parks at lower elevations, and is working on a second reservoir at Powell Butte. Reservoirs 1, 5, and 6, which are open, and Reservoir 7, which is underground, are in Mount Tabor Park in southeast Portland, and Reservoirs 3 and 4 are in Washington Park in southwest Portland. Reservoir 2 at Mount Tabor was abandoned in 1976. Work began in September 2009 on a second 50 million-gallon (190,000 m^{3}) underground reservoir to be completed by 2013 at Powell Butte. Its storage capacity is meant to offset the loss of the five open reservoirs at Mount Tabor and Washington parks, which will be disconnected from the water system by 2015. The three functioning Mount Tabor reservoirs, including gatehouses, wrought-iron fences, and ornate lampposts, in Mount Tabor Park, are listed on the National Register of Historic Places. The Washington Park reservoirs and their gatehouses and fences are also listed on the National Register.

Storage reservoirs in the city
Number	Location (park)	Date built	Capacity	Maximum depth	Walking circumference	Remarks	Note
1	Mount Tabor (upper southern flank)	1894	12 million US gallons (45,000 m^{3})	32 feet (9.8 m)	0.2 miles (0.32 km)	Supplies water to distribution system and Portland's west side.	
2	Mount Tabor	1894	20 million US gallons (76,000 m^{3})	–	–	Abandoned 1976	
3	Washington	1894	16.4 million US gallons (62,000 m^{3})	49 feet (15 m)	0.25 miles (0.40 km)	Water arrives mainly by gravity feed from Reservoir 5 at Mount Tabor. Supplies the parts of the city in the low hills west of the Willamette River.	
4	Washington	1894	17.6 million US gallons (67,000 m^{3})	–	–	–	
5	Mount Tabor (western flank)	1911	49 million US gallons (190,000 m^{3})	39 feet (12 m)	0.4 miles (0.64 km)	Feeds Reservoir 6 further downhill as well as Reservoir 3 in Washington Park. Its outflow generates electricity to power lights and equipment in Mount Tabor Park.	
6	Mount Tabor (lower western flank)	1911	37 million US gallons (140,000 m^{3}) per basin	17 feet (5.2 m)	0.53 miles (0.85 km)	Rectangular, divided by a wall into two equal basins (active and empty) alternated every six months after reservoir cleaning. Supplies lower-elevation neighborhoods on Portland's east side.	
7	Mount Tabor (underground)	1912	200,000 US gallons (760 m^{3})	–	–	–	
Powell Butte	Powell Butte	1981	50 million US gallons (190,000 m^{3})	–	–	Receives water from Bull Run and, when necessary, city-owned wells. Supplies distribution system and suburbs.	
Powell Butte 2	Powell Butte	–	50 million US gallons (190,000 m^{3})	–	–	Scheduled for completion by 2013.	

From the storage reservoirs, much of the water flows or is pumped into 64 water-storage tanks distributed around the city to provide each neighborhood with enough water pressure for regular use and for firefighting. Tanks of concrete or steel are either buried, partly buried, at ground-level, elevated, or set up as cylindrical standpipes. Concrete tanks hold between 60,000 US gallons (230 m^{3}) and 4 million gallons (15,000 m^{3}), and steel tanks hold from 30,000 US gallons (110 m^{3}) to more than 5 million gallons (19,000 m^{3}). The oldest tanks in the system date to 1907 and 1909, while the newest tank was built in 2001. Water flows through the tanks continuously to ensure that the water reaching customers is fresh. From the tanks, water flows through underground pipes called "water mains" from which small branch pipes lead to individual water meters and then the private water pipes of individual homes and businesses.

== Water quality ==
=== Treatment ===
Portland's raw water from Bull Run is of such high quality, among the best in the U.S., that it does not need to be filtered. The bureau monitors water quality at Bull Run Lake, the two reservoirs, the mouths of the four major tributaries that enter the reservoirs, and at the raw-water intake at the headworks. The supply complies with all state and federal regulations under the Safe Drinking Water Act (SDWA).

To treat the raw water, the bureau uses a process called chloramination, which disinfects the water with chlorine then adds ammonia to prolong the chlorine's effectiveness. Although these additives kill microorganisms such as coloform bacteria and giardia that can cause disease in humans, they can react with naturally occurring compounds in water to form other compounds such as trihalomethanes. Under provisions of the SDWA, the bureau monitors the levels of disinfectant byproducts to ensure that they remain under the maximum limits set by the United States Environmental Protection Agency (EPA) and enforced by the Oregon Department of Human Services (ODHS).

Since 1997, in response to targets set by the ODHS, the bureau has been adding sodium hydroxide to the water to reduce its potential for corroding lead and copper in home plumbing. The treatment, which makes the water less acidic, has resulted in "at least a 50 percent reduction in lead at the tap... ". The target pH range is 7.8 to 8.0.

=== Limiting contamination ===
Long protected by land-use controls, the watershed is free of contaminants of concern except for naturally occurring microbes such as Giardia lamblia, Cryptosporidium, fecal coliform bacteria and total coliform bacteria, which are found in virtually all freshwater ecosystems. In the Bull Run watershed, sources of giardia and fecal coliform bacteria are limited to wildlife such as deer, elk, cougar, and North American beaver. Sources of Cryptosporidium include most species of wild mammals and several bird species. A fence around the diversion pool at the headworks prevents direct animal contact with water near the system intake.

All water supplied by Portland's public water system meets or surpasses federal and state drinking water standards. Each year, the water bureau analyzes more than 10,000 water samples from reservoirs in the watershed and in the city, from groundwater, and from the distribution system and consumers' taps. The monitoring schedules comply with federal and state regulations, and records of the analyses are available to the public.

To comply with the EPA's Total Coliform Rule of 1990, the water bureau must collect and analyze at least 210 water samples each month from its distribution system. The rule requires that total coliform bacteria be absent in 95 percent of the samples; if a positive sample is found, three more samples must be collected and analyzed within 24 hours. Any positive Escherichia coli (E. coli) sample followed by a positive total coliform sample, or a positive total coliform sample followed by a positive E. coli sample is a violation of the Total Coliform Rule. In practice, following guidelines approved by the State of Oregon in 2005, the water bureau analyzes between 250 and 350 samples each month. Between 1990 and late November 2009, a total of 14 water samples tested positive for E. coli but all follow-up samples tested negative.

However, routine water samples collected beginning November 25, 2009, from Reservoir 3 in Washington Park indicated the presence of E. coli in the follow-up test as well as the first test. The water bureau issued a boil-water advisory to its customers west of the Willamette River on November 28, 2009, as well as customers of the Valley View, Burlington and Palatine Hill water districts. The advisory was lifted on November 29, 2009.

Another EPA rule, the Long Term 2 Surface Water Treatment Rule (LT2) of 2000, has been the subject of controversy between the EPA and the City of Portland. This supplement to the Clean Water Act of 1996 was designed to reduce illness linked to Cryptosporidium and other microbes in drinking-water systems. The rule, which applies to any drinking-water system in the U.S. that uses surface water or groundwater, is relevant to about 14,000 systems. The City of Portland has argued that the Cryptosporidium threat to the city's water is so low that the EPA rule should not apply to Portland, but its efforts to seek legal or legislative relief have been unsuccessful. A legal challenge was denied in 2007, and Oregon Senator Jeff Merkley informed the water bureau in June 2009 that a legislative approach had little chance of success. Meanwhile, the bureau is pursuing "multiple and simultaneous paths to comply with LT2". On January 13, 2010, the EPA rejected the city's request for a variance from LT2 that would have allowed it to continue to use open reservoirs. The city is building new underground reservoirs to replace the open reservoirs, and it plans to treat the source water with ultraviolet UV light unless the EPA grants a variance or an acceptable alternative can be found. The EPA deadline for compliance is April 2014.

=== PPCPs ===
Although the EPA does not require testing for pharmaceuticals and personal care products (PPCP)s in drinking water, the Portland Water Bureau monitors the Bull Run and groundwater supplies for their presence. PPCPs include prescription and non-prescription drugs for humans, veterinary drugs, vitamins, cosmetics, diagnostic agents, and other personal-care or pharmaceutical chemicals. When the Bull Run water was first tested for PPCPs in August 2006, the water bureau found an extremely low level, 9.2 parts per trillion of caffeine. Regulated contaminants are generally measured in parts per billion, which is a thousand times larger than parts per trillion. Tests of the groundwater in October 2007 found extremely low levels (25 parts per trillion or less) of acetaminophen, caffeine, ibuprofen, and sulfamethoxazole. Testing in April and May 2008 found no PPCPs in the Bull Run supply and trace amounts (18 parts per trillion or less) of estradiol and ethinylestradiol in the groundwater supply. In August and November 2008, tests found no PPCPs in the groundwater supply.

== Notes and references ==
Notes

== Sources ==
- MacColl, E. Kimbark (November 1976). The Shaping of a City: Business and Politics in Portland, Oregon 1885 to 1915. Portland, Oregon: The Georgian Press Company. pp. 62–68. OCLC 2645815.
- Scott, Harvey Whitefield (1890). History of Portland, Oregon, with Illustrations and Biographical Sketches of Prominent Citizens and Pioneers. Syracuse, New York: D. Mason & Company – via Internet Archive. "overton."
- Short, Casey (1983). Water: Portland's Precious Heritage. Portland: City of Portland.
