= Bull Run National Forest =

Former National Forest of Oregon that is now part of Mount Hood National forest

Coordinates: 45°22′14″N 121°42′14″W

Bull Run National Forest was established as the Bull Run Forest Reserve by the United States General Land Office in Oregon on June 17, 1892, with 142,080 acres (575.0 km^{2}). After the transfer of federal forests to the U.S. Forest Service in 1905, it became a National Forest on March 4, 1907. On July 1, 1908, the entire forest was combined with part of Cascade National Forest to establish Oregon National Forest and the name was discontinued. The lands are now part of Mount Hood National Forest.

== See also ==
- Bull Run River (Oregon)
- Bull Run Watershed
- Adolph Aschoff
