= Badger Creek (disambiguation) =

Badger Creek may refer to:

- Badger Creek, Victoria, a town in Australia
- Badger Creek (Arkansas River tributary), a creek in Colorado
- Badger Creek (Des Moines River), a river in Iowa
- Badger Creek (Blue Earth River), a river in Minnesota
- Badger Creek (Houston County, Minnesota)
- Badger Creek Wilderness, a wilderness area in Oregon
