= Little Niagara Falls (Oregon) =

- Interactive map of Little Niagara Falls
- Location: Salmon–Huckleberry Wilderness
- Coordinates: 45.24381°N 121.89473°W
- Type: Cascade
- Elevation: 2,146 ft (654 m)
- Total height: unconfirmed

Little Niagara Falls, is a waterfall located on the Salmon River at the south skirt of the Mount Hood National Forest, in Clackamas County, in the U.S. state of Oregon. It is located in a privileged area where the river creates several waterfalls: Final Falls, Vanishing Falls, Frustration Falls, and Copper Creek Falls are within a mile from Little Niagara Falls; while Hideaway Falls, Split Falls, and Stein Falls are approximately two miles away.

The cascade and its river trail are surrounded by forest of Douglas fir, western hemlock, red cedar, bigleaf maple, red alder and black cottonwood trees.

== Access ==
Hiking to Little Niagara Falls starts at a trailhead that runs south along Salmon River starting in the town of Welches on U.S. Route 26 as it goes through Mount Hood National Forest. The trail is approximately 10 mi (16 km) long and requires skill, visitors should always follow rules of safe waterfall hiking when visiting Little Niagara Falls.

== See also ==
- List of waterfalls in Oregon
