= Vanishing Falls =

- Interactive map of Vanishing Falls
- Location: Salmon–Huckleberry Wilderness
- Coordinates: 45.24472°N 121.89556°W
- Type: Cascade
- Elevation: 2,186 ft (666 m)
- Total height: unconfirmed

Vanishing Falls, is a waterfall located on the Salmon River at the south skirt of the Mount Hood National Forest, in Clackamas County, in the U.S. state of Oregon. It is located in a privileged area where the river creates several waterfalls: Final Falls, Frustration Falls, Little Niagara Falls, and Copper Creek Falls are within a mile from Vanishing Falls; while Hideaway Falls, Split Falls, and Stein Falls are approximately two miles away.

The cascade and its river trail are surrounded by forest of Douglas fir, western hemlock, and red cedar, interspersed with bigleaf maple, red alder and black cottonwood trees.

== Access ==
Hiking to Vanishing Falls starts at a trailhead that runs south along Salmon River starting in the town of Welches on U.S. Route 26 as it goes through Mount Hood National Forest. Vanishing Falls is the first waterfall upstream Salmon River trail, after Frustration Falls towards Final Falls. The trail is approximately 7 mi (11 km) long and requires skill, visitors should always follow rules of safe waterfall hiking when visiting Vanishing Falls.

== See also ==
- List of waterfalls in Oregon
