= East Fork Salmon River (Oregon) =

- Location of the mouth of the East Fork Salmon River in Oregon

Location
- Country: United States
- State: Oregon
- County: Clackamas County

Physical characteristics
- Source: Mount Hood National Forest
  - location: Mount Hood
  - coordinates: 45°18′00″N 121°41′31″W
  - elevation: 4,342 ft (1,323 m)
- Mouth: Salmon River
  - location: near Trillium Lake
  - coordinates: 45°16′24″N 121°43′17″W
  - elevation: 3,517 ft (1,072 m)

The East Fork Salmon River is a short tributary of the Salmon River in Clackamas County, in the U.S. state of Oregon. It begins on the southern slopes of Mount Hood at an elevation of about 4,300 feet (1,300 m) and flows generally southwest into the main stem at Red Top Meadow, slightly east of Trillium Lake. Its entire course lies within the Mount Hood National Forest. It has no named tributaries.

Near its headwaters, the river passes under Oregon Route 35 near Barlow Pass. Further downstream, it crosses Forest Road 3521 near the Pioneer Woman's Grave Trail. Shortly before reaching Red Top Meadow, the river passes under U.S. Route 26.

== See also ==
- List of rivers of Oregon
