= Wildwood Recreation Site =

Recreation area in Oregon, United States

Wildwood Recreation Area
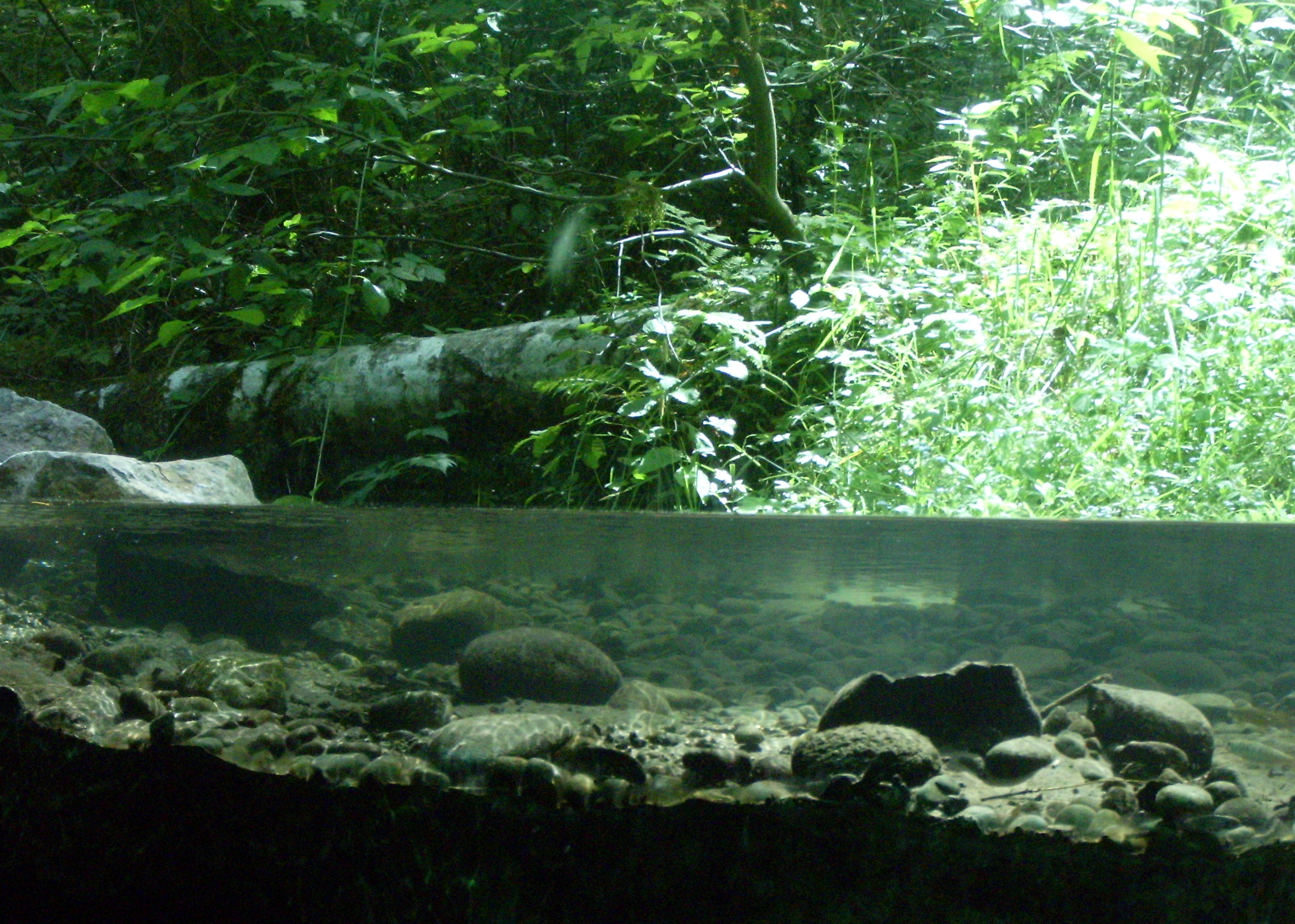
- Underground stream viewing station at Wildwood Recreation site
- Interactive map of Wildwood Recreation Area
- Location: Mount Hood National Forest, Clackamas County, Oregon, USA
- Nearest city: approx. 39 miles (63 km) from Portland, Oregon
- Coordinates: 45.3526191°N 121.9967476°W
- Area: 580 acres (230 ha)
- Governing body: Bureau of Land Management
- Website: Wildwood Recreation Area

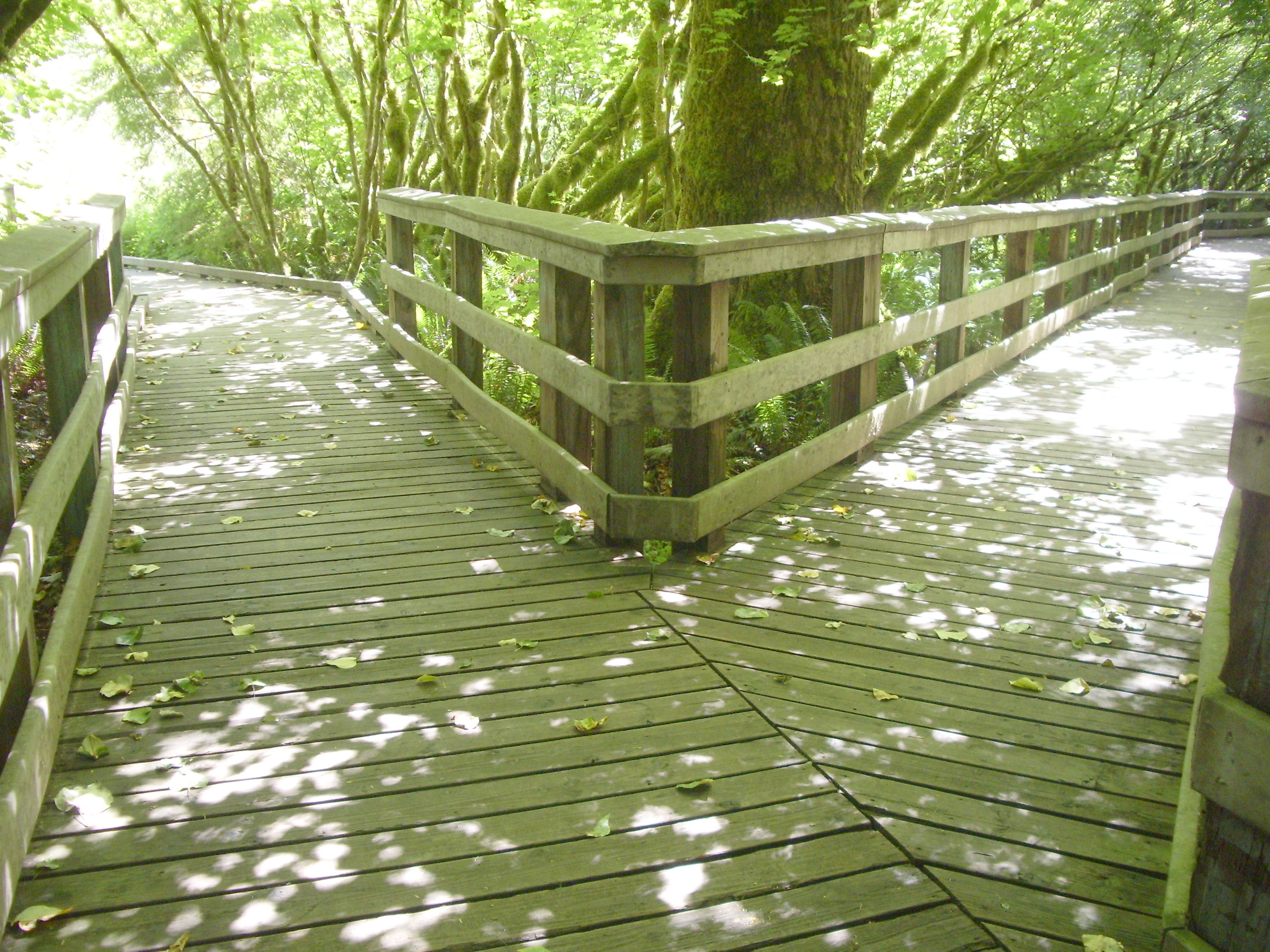
Fork in the boardwalk on the wetland walk

The Wildwood Recreation Site is a natural recreation area surrounded by the Mount Hood National Forest in northern Oregon, United States. It encompasses 580 acres (230 ha) of old growth forest and five miles (8 km) of interpretive trail along the Salmon River. It features Cascade Streamwatch, an underwater viewport into a mountain stream bed and live fish habitat. There is a wetland boardwalk trail, and trail access to the nearby 70-square-mile (180 km^{2}) Salmon-Huckleberry Wilderness, and the Sandy River.

Wildwood educational programs offer scientists and researchers to help students gather and analyze environmental data related to the Salmon environment such as the river's chemical and physical properties, and the many resident invertebrates.

A variety of streams and wetlands provide a diverse environment. Sixes Creek and a quarter mile (400 m) side channel of the Salmon River (restored in 1998), provide habitat for several anadromous fish: steelhead, Cutthroat trout and Chinook salmon. The wetlands and Huckleberry Mountain are the source of Sixes Creek, both of which provide habitat for juvenile Coho salmon, waterbirds, amphibians, and migratory birds. Other frequently seen wildlife include beavers, blacktail deer, raccoons, rabbits, and snakes. The entire 33.9 mile (55 km) length of the Salmon River is protected as a National Wild and Scenic River. Wildwood Recreation Site is 39 miles (63 km) east of Portland, Oregon, on U.S. Route 26 along the Mount Hood Scenic Byway just east of the Mount Hood National Forest information center. This area was near the end of the Barlow Road, the end of the Oregon Trail.

The site is administered by the Bureau of Land Management and charges an admission fee. Facilities include outdoor study areas, picnic areas, group shelters for up to 200 people, softball diamonds, volleyball pits, basketball courts, horseshoe pits, playground with jungle gym, swings and slides.
