= Final Falls =

- Interactive map of Final Falls
- Location: Salmon–Huckleberry Wilderness
- Coordinates: 45.2475°N 121.89806°W
- Type: Cascade
- Elevation: 2,040 ft (620 m)
- Total height: 80 ft (24 m)

Final Falls, is a waterfall located on the Salmon River at the south skirt of the Mount Hood National Forest, in Clackamas County, in the U.S. state of Oregon. It is located in a privileged area where the river creates several waterfalls: Frustration Falls, Vanishing Falls, Little Niagara Falls, and Copper Creek Falls are within a mile from Final Falls; while Hideaway Falls, Split Falls, and Stein Falls are approximately two miles away.

The cascade and its river trail are surrounded by forest of Douglas fir, western hemlock, red cedar, bigleaf maple, red alder and black cottonwood trees.

== Access ==
Hiking to Final Falls starts at a trailhead that runs south along Salmon River starting in the town of Welches on U.S. Route 26 as it goes through Mount Hood National Forest. Final Falls is the last waterfall upstream, after Vanishing Falls and Frustration Falls. The trail is approximately 7 mi (11 km) long and requires skill, visitors should always follow rules of safe waterfall hiking when visiting Final Falls. There is no trail access to this waterfall.

== See also ==
- List of waterfalls in Oregon
