= Sherry Lynn =

American voice actress

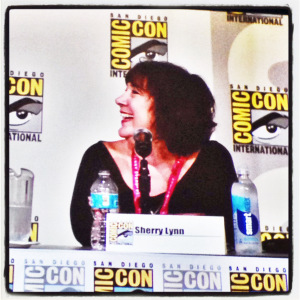
- Lynn at San Diego Comic-Con 2014
- Other names: Katie Ashley, Katie Evans, Roberta Kim, Shirley Lane
- Occupation: Voice actress
- Years active: 1975–present

Sherry Lynn is an American voice actress who has played roles in anime, animated television series and video games. She portrayed Sasami Jurai in the Tenchi Muyo! franchise.

In January 2010, in terms of total film gross, she was the Highest Grossing Female in the Movies and 23rd overall, with a total movie gross of over $2.5 billion US for her work in 26 movies.

She is also one of the co-founders and co-artistic directors of the Children's Theatre Group of Southern California.

== Notable voice roles ==
=== Anime ===
- .hack//Liminality - Yuki Aihara
- Adventures of Mini-Goddess - Skuld
- Ah! My Goddess The Movie - Skuld
- Ai Tenchi Muyo! - Sasami
- Ai Yori Aoshi - Maho
- Apocalypse Zero - Yukiko Horie
- Bio Hunter - Sayaka
- Blood Lad - Liz
- Cardcaptor Sakura Movie 2: The Sealed Card - Naoko Yanagisawa
- The Dog of Flanders - Eilina
- Dual! Parallel Trouble Adventure - D
- Fate/stay night - Sakura Matou
- Final Fantasy: Legend of the Crystals - Linaly
- Fushigi Yûgi Eikoden - Young Mayo (Ep. 4)
- Gad Guard - Satsuki Sanada, Young Hajiki
- Gatekeepers - Saemi Ukiya
- Ghost in the Shell: Stand Alone Complex - Tachikoma, Moe (MISSING HEARTS)
- Ghost in the Shell: Stand Alone Complex Solid State Society - Tachikoma, Togusa's Daughter
- Kiki's Delivery Service - Madame's Granddaughter (Birthday Girl)
- The Legend of Black Heaven - Eriko
- Mobile Suit Gundam - The Movie Trilogy - Letz, Zena Zabi
- Ninja Scroll: The Series - Yayoi
- Please Twins! - Akina Sagawa
- Princess Mononoke - Woman in Iron Town, Emishi Village Girl
- Psycho Diver: Soul Siren - Yuki Kano
- Rozen Maiden - Hinaichigo
- Samurai Girl Real Bout High School - Misao Aoki
- Serial Experiments Lain - Girl (Ep. 4)
- Street Fighter Alpha: The Animation - Kei Chitose
- Tenchi Muyo! - Sasami Masaki Jurai, Tsunami, Kiyone Makibi (1st voice), Jijyo
- The Big O - Tami (Ep. 16)
- Trigun - Moore
- Ultra Maniac - Rio
- Wolf's Rain - Cheza

=== Animation ===
- A Bug's Life - Additional Voices
- Adventures from the Book of Virtues - Marygold
- Aladdin - Additional Voices
- An American Tail: Fievel Goes West - Additional Voices
- Beauty and the Beast - Additional Voices
- Bonkers - Marilyn Piquel, Katya
- Brother Bear - Additional Voices
- Cinderella II: Dreams Come True - Additional Voices
- Cloudy with a Chance of Meatballs - Additional Voices
- Darkwing Duck - Radiowave
- Dr. Seuss' The Lorax - Additional Voices
- DuckTales the Movie: Treasure of the Lost Lamp - Additional Voices
- The Dukes - Additional Voices
- The Emperor's New Groove - Additional Voices
- Finding Nemo - Additional Voices
- The Get Along Gang - Portia Porcupine
- Happily N'Ever After - Additional Voices
- Hercules - Additional Voices
- Horton Hears a Who! - Additional Voices
- The Hunchback of Notre Dame - Additional Voices
- Ice Age: The Meltdown - Additional Voices
- Inside Out - Mother's Joy
- The Iron Giant - Maine Woman #2
- The Little Mermaid - Adella (Ariel's sister)
- Little Nemo: Adventures in Slumberland – Bon Bon
- Minions – Additional Voices
- Monsters, Inc. – Additional Voices
- Monsters University – Additional Voices
- My Little Pony - Galaxy, Cherries Jubilee, Gingerbread, Baby Sundance, Water Lily, Princess Royal Blue, Baby Half-Note
- Osmosis Jones – Additional Voices
- Partysaurus Rex – Cuddles the Alligator
- Pink Panther and Sons – Chatta
- ProStars – Additional Voices
- Quack Pack – Alexandra Mergancer
- Quest for Camelot – Additional Voices
- Riley's First Date? – Mom's Disguist, Mom's Joy,
- Rugrats – Sandbox Kid
- Spirited Away – Additional Voices
- Surf's Up – Additional Voices
- Tarzan – Additional Voices
- Toy Story - Additional Voices
- Toy Story 2 - Additional Voices
- Up - Additional Voices
- WALL-E - Additional Voices

=== Merchandise ===
- Care Bears - Laugh-a-Lot Bear (as a stuffed toy)

=== Television series ===
- McGurk: A Dog's Life - Camille
- Between the Lions - The Punctuator (from "Little Wendy Tales")
- Who's the Boss? - Photographer

=== Video games ===
- 102 Dalmatians: Puppies to the Rescue - Crystal the Snow Bunny Rabbit
- Baten Kaitos Origins - Tik & Quis
- Drakengard/Drakengard 2 - young Manah
- Final Fantasy X and X-2 - Shelinda
- Final Fantasy XIII - Cocoon Inhabitants
- Ghost in the Shell: Stand Alone Complex - Tachikoma
- Grandia III - Unama
- Hyperdimension Neptunia mk2 - Tekken
- Neptunia ReVerse - Tekken
- Pilotwings 64 - Kiwi
- Radiata Stories - Adina, Elena, Lulu, and Marsha
- Rumble Roses XX - EDIT Voice Type 2
- Star Ocean: First Departure - Lulu
- Star Ocean: Till the End of Time - Peppita Rossetti
- Suikoden IV - Noah
- Suikoden Tactics - Noah
- Suikoden V - Josephine
- The Sword of Etheria - Dorothy
- Xenosaga Episode I: Der Wille zur Macht - MOMO

=== Other ===
- PBS Kids - Dot
- Gangstar: Lost Of Stock Car Race - Baby Hamm & Him 6Y
