= Mount Defiance (Oregon) =

Mountain in Oregon, United States

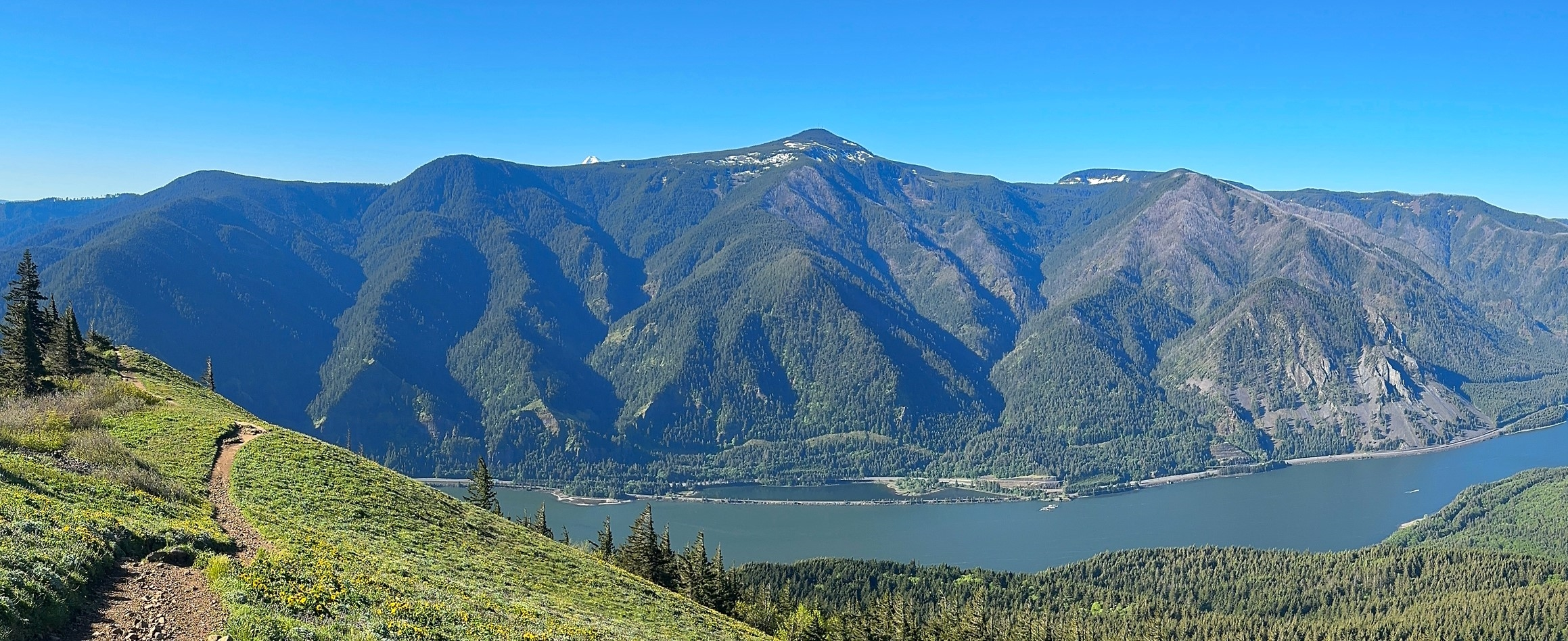
- Mount Defiance from Dog Mountain

Highest point
- Elevation: 5,010 ft (1,530 m) NAVD 88
- Prominence: 1,520 ft (460 m)
- Coordinates: 45°38′55″N 121°43′22″W

Geography
- Location within Oregon
- Country: United States
- State: Oregon
- Region: Mount Hood National Forest
- County: Hood River
- Parent range: Cascades
- Topo map: Mount Defiance

Geology
- Mountain type: Shield volcano
- Last eruption: Pleistocene

Mount Defiance is a peak near the Columbia River Gorge in the US state of Oregon. It rises to an elevation of 5,010 feet (1,527 m) in the Mount Hood National Forest in Hood River County, Oregon. The northern and western flanks of the mountain are in the Mark O. Hatfield Wilderness. The route up the mountain is often considered one of the hardest climbs in the Gorge; the trail gains 5,000 feet (1,500 m) in 6 miles (9.7 km) from the Starvation Creek Trailhead.

Mount Defiance is composed chiefly of lava flows. The base is basalt from an old shield volcano, and it is capped by andesite.

The mountain was named by Dr. P.G. Barrett, an early resident of the Hood River Valley, as he believed it retained its winter snow late into the spring in defiance of the warming weather.
