= Frustration Falls =

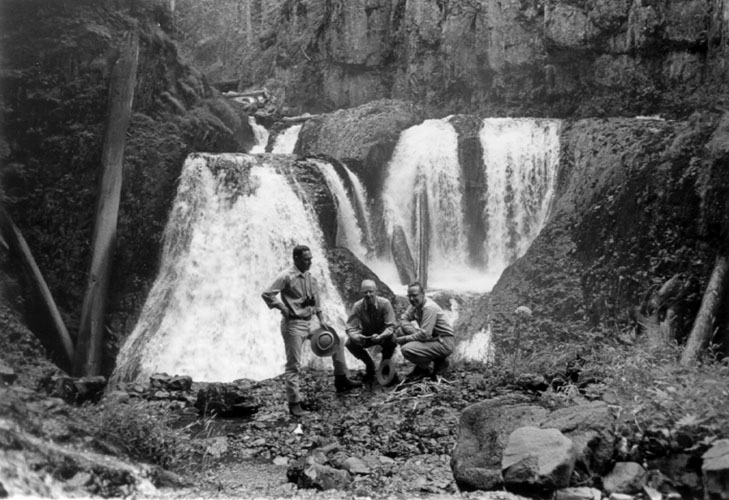
- 1963 photo of the expedition to name the waterfalls in the Salmon River Gorge
- Interactive map of Frustration Falls
- Location: Salmon–Huckleberry Wilderness
- Coordinates: 45.24667°N 121.89694°W
- Type: Cascade
- Elevation: 2,165 ft (660 m)
- Total height: unconfirmed

Frustration Falls, is a three drop waterfall located on the Salmon River at the south skirt of the Mount Hood National Forest, in Clackamas County, in the U.S. state of Oregon. It is located in a privileged area where the river creates several waterfalls: Final Falls, Vanishing Falls, Little Niagara Falls, and Copper Creek Falls are within a mile from Frustration Falls; while Hideaway Falls, Split Falls, and Stein Falls are approximately two miles away.

The cascade and its river trail are surrounded by forest of Douglas fir, western hemlock, red cedar, bigleaf maple, red alder and black cottonwood trees.

== Access ==
Hiking to Frustration Falls starts at a trailhead that runs south along Salmon River starting in the town of Welches on U.S. Route 26 as it goes through Mount Hood National Forest. The first landmark is the Green Canyon Campground with a functional restroom. The trail crosses over the Salmon River through a wooden bridge. Two miles later, nestled in the forest along the trail is the historic Rolling Riffle Campground. A mile ahead the trail leads to the Bighorn Campground. Approximately a half mile after is Final Falls and further upstream Frustration Falls.

The trail is approximately 7 mi (11 km) long and requires skill, visitors should always follow rules of safe waterfall hiking when visiting Frustration Falls.

== See also ==
- List of waterfalls in Oregon
