= Badger Creek Wilderness =

Wilderness area in Oregon, USA

- IUCN category Ib (wilderness area)
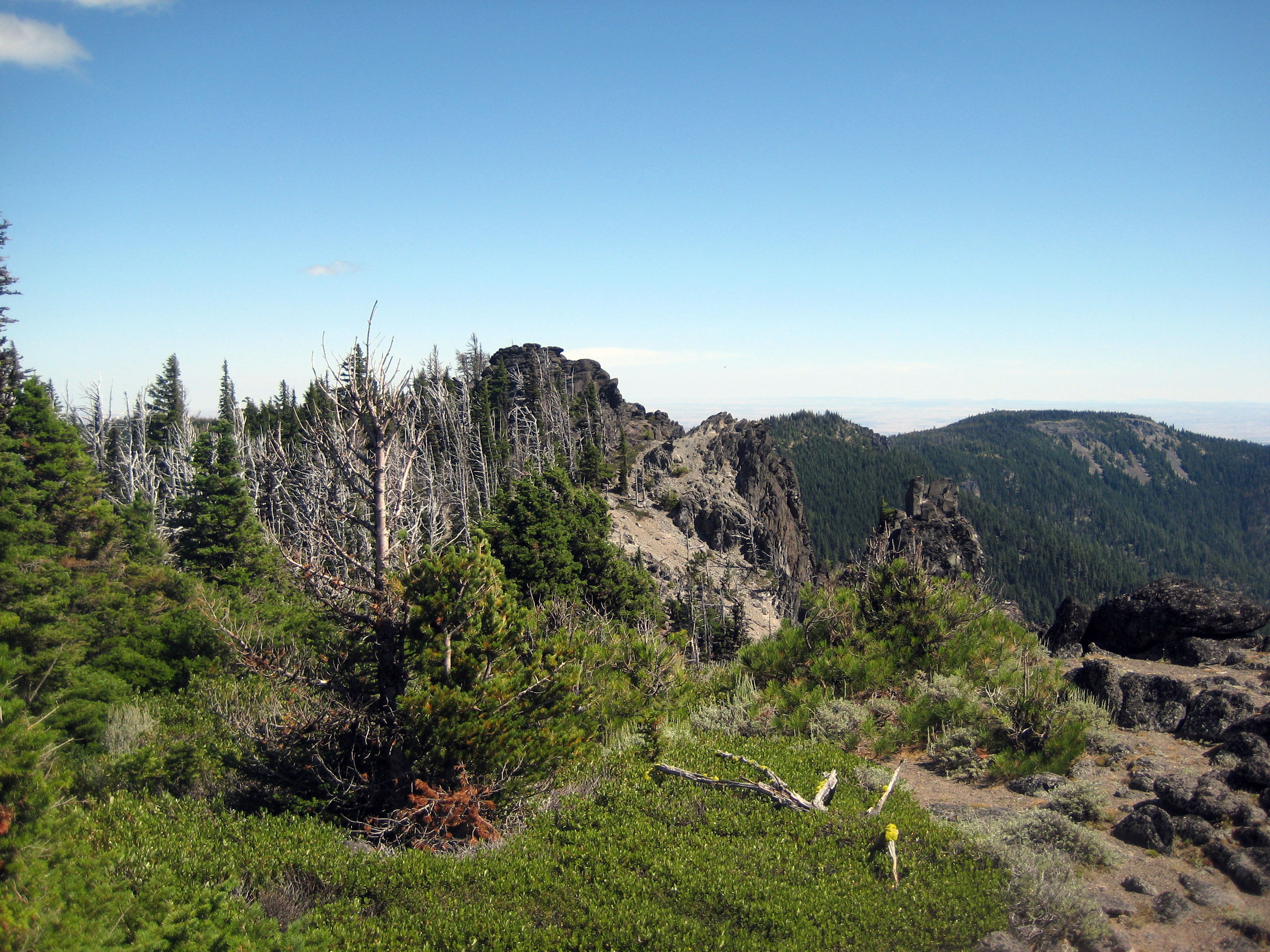
- Badger Creek Wilderness
- Interactive map of Badger Creek Wilderness
- Location: Wasco / Hood River counties, Oregon, USA
- Nearest city: Dufur, Oregon
- Coordinates: 45°18′22″N 121°28′35″W
- Area: 29,057 acres (11,759 ha)
- Established: 1984
- Governing body: U.S. Forest Service

The Badger Creek Wilderness is a 29,057-acre (11,759 ha) wilderness area located east of Mount Hood in the northwestern Cascades of Oregon, United States. It is one of six designated wilderness areas in the Mount Hood National Forest, the others being Mark O. Hatfield, Salmon-Huckleberry, Mount Hood, Mount Jefferson, and Bull of the Woods.

== Topography ==
The elevation of Badger Creek Wilderness ranges from 2,100 to 6,525 feet (640 to 1,989 m). Steep walled glacial valleys lead to the top of Lookout Mountain, at 6,525 feet (1,989 m). Annual precipitation in the Wilderness ranges from 80 inches (203 cm) on the western ridges to 20 inches (51 cm) in the dry eastern lowlands.

Three creeks drain the Wilderness - Badger, Little Badger, and Tygh.

== Vegetation ==
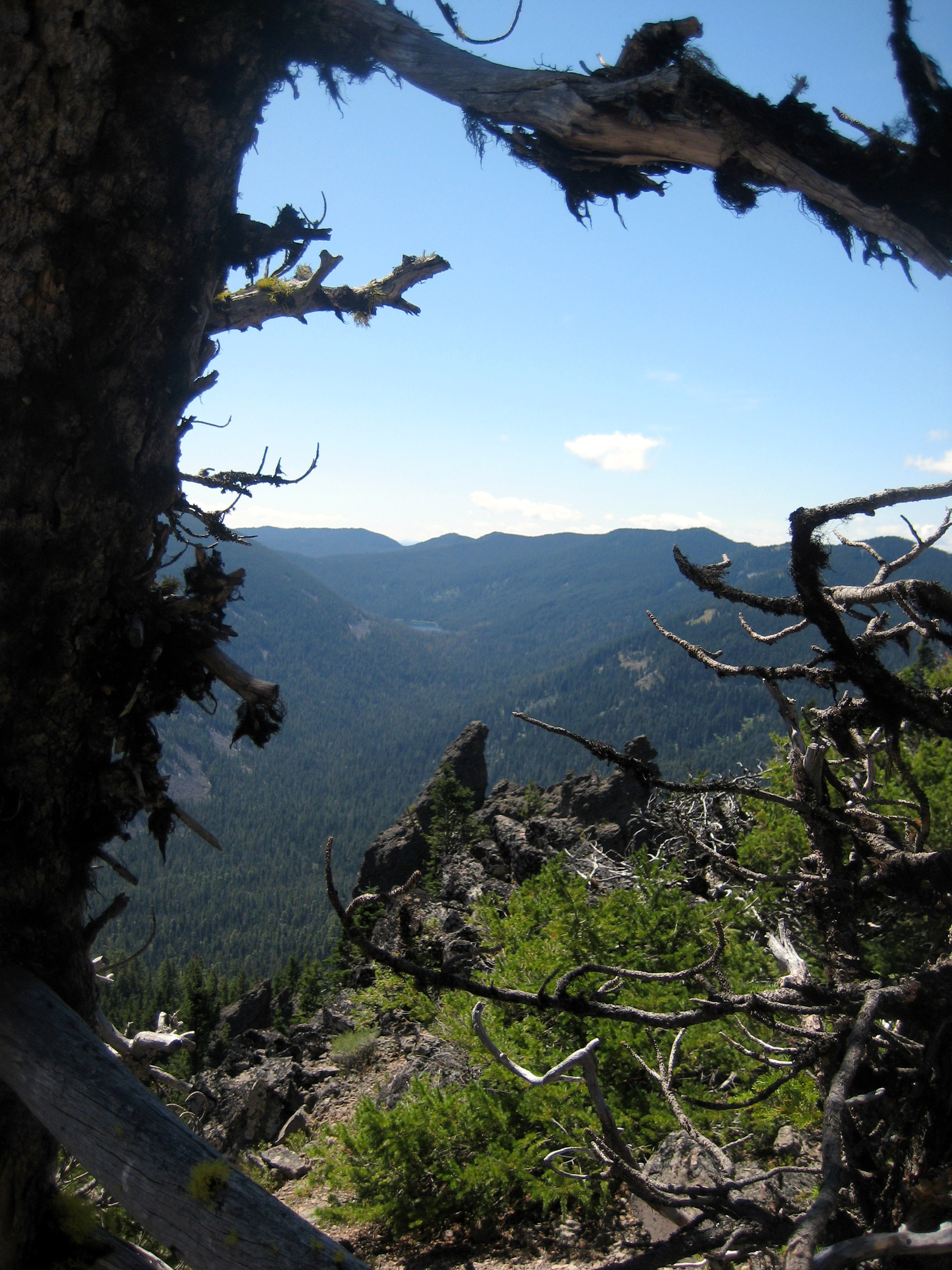
Badger Creek Wilderness from the Divide Trail in the northwestern portion of the wilderness

Lookout Mountain and the high ridgeland extending east support a subalpine ecosystem, with hardy trees and rocky terrain. Penstemon, Indian paintbrush, yellow avalanche lilies, and stonecrop are common in the area. Farther east in the Wilderness the climate is warm and dry, where ponderosa pine forest and extensive growths of Oregon white oak and grasslands are common. Larkspur, shooting star, lupine, balsamroot, death camas, and purple onion can be found in the area.

== Recreation ==
Common recreational activities in Badger Creek Wilderness include hiking, camping, wildlife watching, cross-country skiing, and horseback riding. There are approximately 55 miles (89 km) of developed trails in the Wilderness. These trails lead to Lookout Mountain, Flag Point fire lookout, Badger Lake, and along Badger, Little Badger, and Tygh Creeks. There are several primitive campsites in the wilderness. the Bonney Butte area of the wilderness is in Mount Hood National Recreation Area.

Despite efforts by firefighters, the Flag Point fire lookout was destroyed in the 2026 Grasshopper Fire, which as of August 26, 2026, had burned over 93,000 acres—much of it within the Wilderness area. Access to many roads, trails, and campgrounds in the Wilderness were closed by the US Forest Service due to the fire.

== See also ==
- List of Oregon Wildernesses
- List of U.S. Wilderness Areas
- Old growth
- List of old growth forests
- Wilderness Act
