= South Fork Salmon River (Oregon) =

- Location of the mouth of the South Fork Salmon River in Oregon

Location
- Country: United States
- State: Oregon
- County: Clackamas

Physical characteristics
- Source: Cascade Range
  - location: near Salmon Mountain, Salmon–Huckleberry Wilderness
  - coordinates: 45°13′13″N 121°58′56″W
  - elevation: 3,622 ft (1,104 m)
- Mouth: Salmon River
  - location: near Green Canyon Campground, Mount Hood National Forest
  - coordinates: 45°16′19″N 121°56′18″W
  - elevation: 1,624 ft (495 m)

The South Fork Salmon River is a tributary of the Salmon River in Clackamas County in the U.S. state of Oregon. Arising near Plaza Lake, it flows generally northeast along the east side of Salmon Mountain to meet the Salmon 11 miles (18 km) upstream of the larger stream's confluence with the Sandy River at Brightwood.

The entire South Fork lies within the Salmon-Huckleberry Wilderness, which is part of Mount Hood National Forest. The South Fork's only named tributary is Mack Hall Creek, which enters from the right.

Green Canyon Campground, about 4 miles (6 km) by road from Wemme, is along the Salmon River about a mile downstream of the mouth of the South Fork. Open from late May to late September, the campground has sites for tents and recreational vehicles (RV)s, picnic tables, and access to hiking trails and trout fishing.

== See also ==
- List of rivers of Oregon
