= Salmon River (Clackamas County, Oregon) =

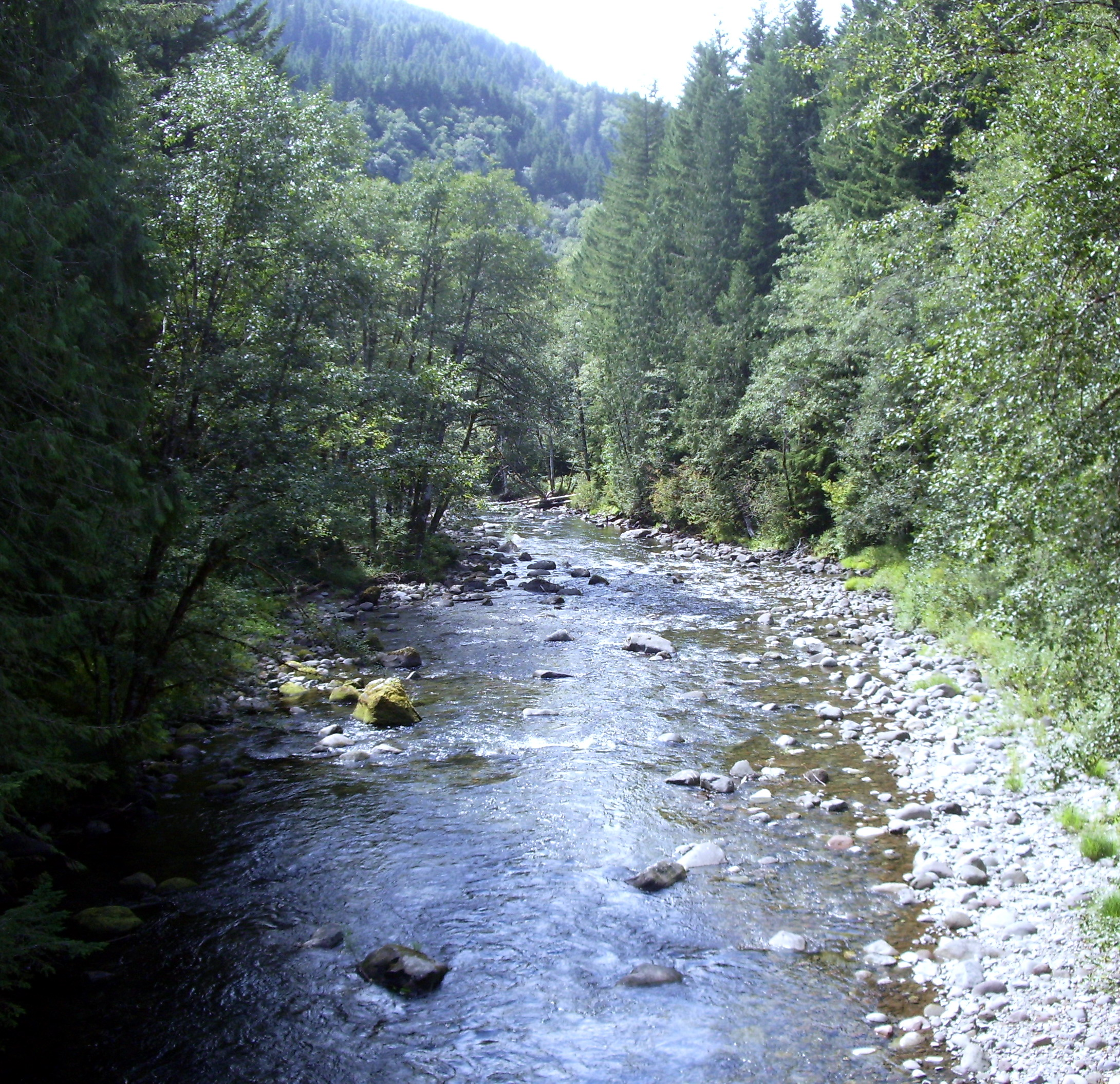
- At Wildwood Recreation Site, less than 2 miles (3 km) from the river mouth

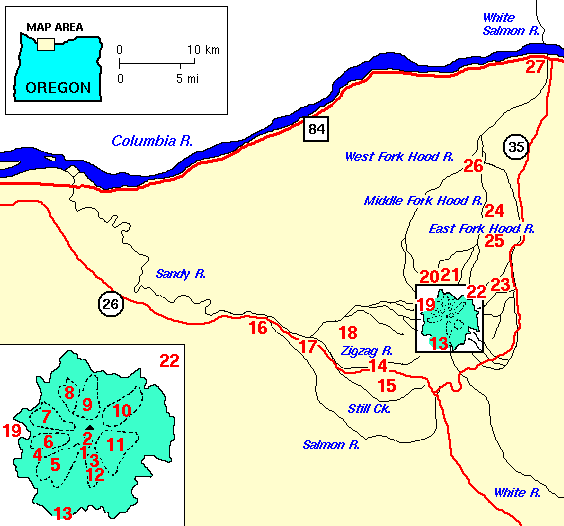
- Mount Hood and vicinity showing the Salmon River (near the bottom center)
- Etymology: Fish (salmon) that frequent the river

Location
- Country: United States
- State: Oregon
- County: Clackamas County

Physical characteristics
- Source: Mount Hood National Forest
  - location: Mount Hood
  - coordinates: 45°20′09″N 121°42′24″W
  - elevation: 6,124 ft (1,867 m)
- Mouth: Sandy River
  - location: Brightwood
  - coordinates: 45°22′36″N 122°01′49″W
  - elevation: 1,017 ft (310 m)
- Length: 33.5 mi (53.9 km)
- Basin size: 115 sq mi (300 km^{2})
- Discharge
  - average: 527 cu ft/s (14.9 m^{3}/s)

National Wild and Scenic River
- Type: Wild, Scenic, Recreational
- Designated: October 28, 1988

The Salmon River is a 33.5-mile (53.9 km) river in the Cascade Range in the U.S. state of Oregon that drains part of southwestern Mount Hood. The entire length of the river is a protected National Wild and Scenic River. Several portions are in protected wilderness. It is affluent to the Sandy River, a tributary of the Columbia River.

== Course ==
The overall course is sickle-shaped with the point facing north at Mount Hood and the handle facing west. The headwaters are on the Mount Hood's south face at the foot of Palmer Glacier east of Silcox Hut. The river, which crosses the Pacific Crest Trail at 5,980 feet (1,820 m), continues directly southward for a few miles and remains east of Timberline Road. As it descends below 4,500 feet (1,400 m), it turns southwest, and continues under Oregon Route 35, elevation 3,600 feet (1,100 m), just east of the junction with U.S. Route 26, and crosses under Route 26 as well.

The West Fork Salmon River begins in the Timberline Lodge ski area under the Pucci chairlift. It flows south-southwest and is joined by natural cold springs at the 5,000-foot (1,500 m) level, continues south-southwest and crosses under Highway 26 just west of the Highway 35 junction. Just after they cross Highway 26, the West Fork and Salmon River join, and a half mile (1 km) later, the Salmon is joined by the East Fork Salmon River which comes out of a steep valley just north of, and below, Barlow Pass.

The combined river flows directly south through Red Top Meadow for about 3 miles (5 km) and begins meandering slightly through Salmon River Meadows, elevation 3,320 feet (1,010 m). At the south end, the river is joined by Ghost Creek, which enters from the left and turns west-southwest for about 4 miles (6 km) before receiving Mud Creek, which flows from Trillium Lake and enters from the right. About 1.5 miles (2.4 km) downstream from Mud Creek, it receives Fir Tree Creek from the right as it enters the eastern boundary of the Salmon–Huckleberry Wilderness.

A steep east–west gorge captures the Salmon River and collects several creeks—Wolf from the right; Inch, Draw String, and Linney from the left. The river turns northwest and in the next 3 miles (5 km), flows over a series of six waterfalls ranging from 15 to 75 feet (4.6 to 22.9 m) high. These include Stein and Split (before Iron and Swift creeks enter from the left and Kinzel Creek from the right), then Little Niagara (before Goat Creek enters from the right), then Vanishing, Frustration, and Final Falls. Iron Creek, near its confluence with the Salmon River, flows over Hideaway Falls.

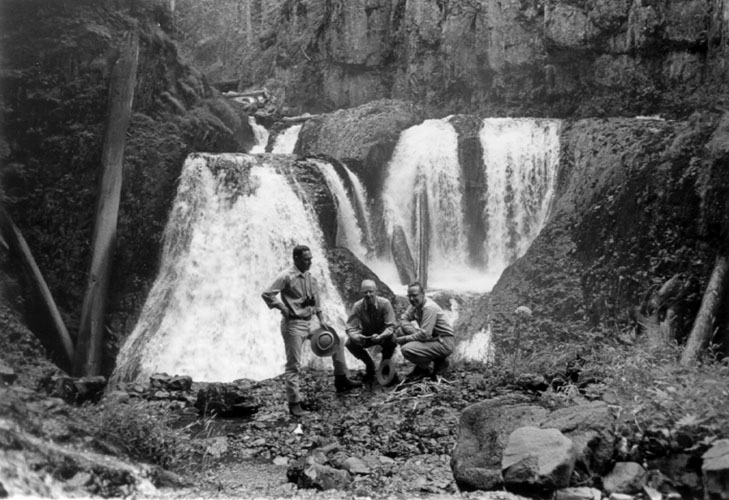
OGNB Members at Frustration Falls, Salmon River Gorge

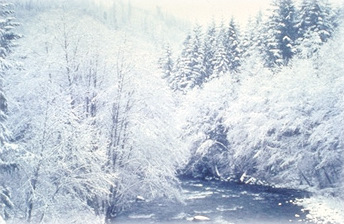
Salmon River in winter

A half mile below Final Falls, Copper Creek joins from the left and, a mile later, Bighorn Creek joins from the left and the river leaves the wilderness area. About 1.5 miles (2.4 km) later, the South Fork Salmon River—which drains about 25 square miles (65 km^{2}) of rugged mountains northeast of Squaw Mountain—enters from the left about a mile above Green Canyon Campground. From here the river flows 11 miles (18 km) on a comparatively level grade, receiving Cheeney Creek from the left just above Welches.

The river then flows roughly parallel to Route 26 past Wemme, then goes through Wildwood Recreation Site near Wildwood. Receiving Boulder Creek from the left, it crosses (again) under Route 26 and merges with the Sandy River near the community of Brightwood. This is 37.5 miles (60.4 km) upstream of the Sandy's confluence with the Columbia River.

== Flora and fauna ==
The lower canyons have black bear, blacktail deer, cougar, badger, fisher, and marten. Dense western hemlock, Douglas-fir are mixed with western red cedar, red alder, and vine maple.

The rare Alaska cedar is found in patches around the Salmon River Meadows.

The upper reaches of the river support cutthroat trout. Downstream of the waterfalls, the river has excellent spawning habitat for steelhead, Chinook salmon, and coho salmon. The river is named for the fish (salmon).

== Recreation ==
=== Boating ===
Whitewater enthusiasts sometimes run a stretch of the lower river that begins downstream of the Salmon–Huckleberry Wilderness boundary. The 5.5-mile (8.9 km) run of "fairly continuous class 2 rapids with great wilderness scenery" begins at a bridge near a wilderness trailhead and ends at the Arrah-Wanna Road bridge. This stretch of water is rated class II+ to III (intermediate) on the International Scale of River Difficulty. Hazards include logs along the banks and a stretch of boulders ending in a 3-foot (1 m) ledge.

Expert kayakers have rarely completed runs in the Salmon River gorge further upstream. Oregon Kayaking says, "The Salmon River Canyon may just be the Mount Everest of Oregon Kayaking. Huge, marginally portageable waterfalls combined with crumbly, near-vertical canyon walls and questionable rescue possibilities make this a very serious venture indeed." These gorge and waterfall runs have been rated class V to V+ (expert, extreme).

=== Camping ===
Alpine Campground lies to the east of Salmon River about halfway between it and the West Fork. The highest campground in the Mount Hood National Forest, it is near Timberline Lodge and offers access to trails for hiking and mountain biking. It has 16 sites for tent camping. Amenities include picnic tables and potable water. Open from early June through early September, the campground sometimes has snow in mid-summer.

Trillium Lake Campground, along Trillium Lake, west of the Salmon River and at the head of one of its tributaries, has more than 50 sites for tents and trailers along a forest road connecting to Route 26 near Government Camp. Amenities include drinking water, picnic tables, toilets, and access to lake and pond fishing, hiking and mountain biking, and non-motorized lake boating.

Green Canyon Campground, about 4 miles (6 km) by road from Wemme, is along the Salmon River about a mile downstream of the mouth of the South Fork. Open from late May to late September, the campground has sites for tents and recreational vehicles (RV)s, picnic tables, and access to hiking trails and rainbow trout fishing. It has vault toilets but no drinking water.

Wildwood Recreation Site is a 550-acre (220 ha) day-use area along the lower river near Wildwood and Route 26. Overseen by the Bureau of Land Management, the site has a variety of picnic tables, shelters, and kitchens, playing fields and courts, a wetland boardwalk, underwater viewing chamber, and an interpretive trail, as well as access to fishing, swimming, and other trails.

=== Hiking ===
The Salmon River West Trailhead, along Welches Road upstream of Green Canyon Campground, provides access to the Salmon–Huckleberry Wilderness via the Salmon River Trail. This trail, 14 miles (23 km) long, generally runs along a forested bluff above the north side of the river. At its eastern end, the Salmon River Trail connects to the Pacific Crest Trail via the 4.5-mile (7.2 km) long Jackpot Meadows Trail. Between the end points, connecting trails such as the 2.1-mile (3.4 km) long Kinzel Lake Trail, make a variety of hikes possible in combinations. This system of trails, collectively known as the Salmon River National Recreation Trail, totals about 70 miles (110 km). Down river from Salmon River West Trailhead, Old Salmon River Trail travels 2.5 miles (4.0 km) to Old Salmon River Trailhead.

== See also ==
- List of National Wild and Scenic Rivers
- List of rivers of Oregon
