= Mount Hood National Recreation Area =

Protected area managed by U.S. Forestry Service

- Location within the United States
- Location: Wasco County Oregon, United States
- Nearest city: Government Camp, Oregon
- Coordinates: 45°16′00″N 121°40′00″W
- Area: 34,550 acres (139.8 km^{2})
- Established: 2009
- Governing body: United States Forest Service

Mount Hood National Recreation Area is a 34,550-acre (13,980 ha) protected area within Mount Hood National Forest in Oregon, USA. Established on March 30, 2009 by the Omnibus Public Land Management Act of 2009 (Pub. L. 111–11 (text) (PDF)§7002), the national recreation area is managed by the U.S. Forest Service. It comprises three non-contiguous units, none of which include Mount Hood itself, which is mostly within the Mount Hood Wilderness in the national forest. The Mount Hood Unit lies to the southeast of Mount Hood and includes portions of the Badger Creek Wilderness (Bonney Butte area) and Mount Hood Wilderness (Barlow Butte and Twin Lakes areas). The Fifteenmile Unit lies directly to the east of the mountain south of Oregon Route 35, and the Shellrock Unit is to the northeast of the mountain, paralleling Route 35.

When the NRA was created, approximately 130 acres of land administered by the Bureau of Land Management were transferred to the Forest Service.
