= Snow Bunny =

Snow play area in Oregon, United States

Coordinates: 45.287493°N 121.728156°W

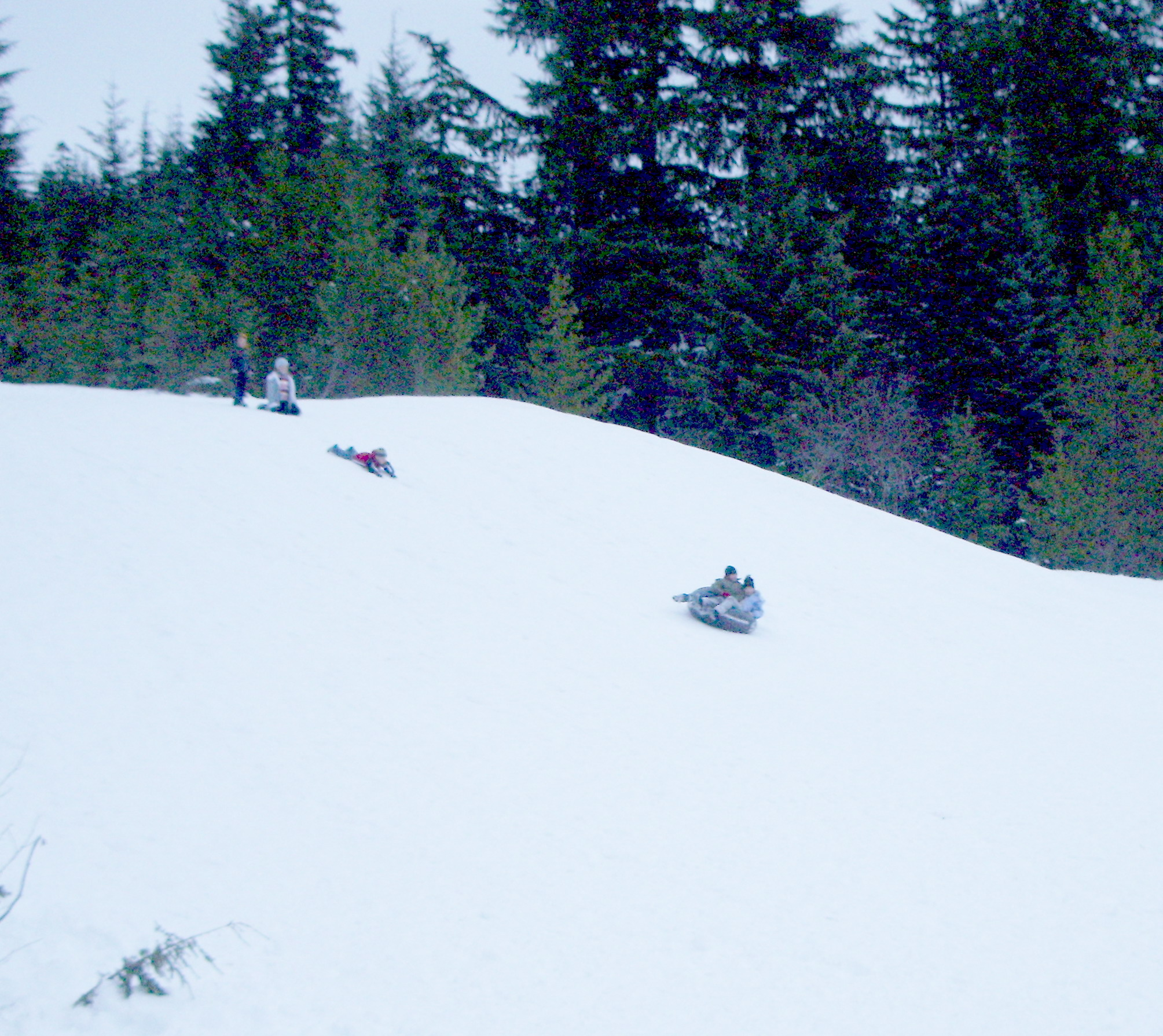
Main tubing hill at Snow Bunny shown at midweek when the concession is not operating

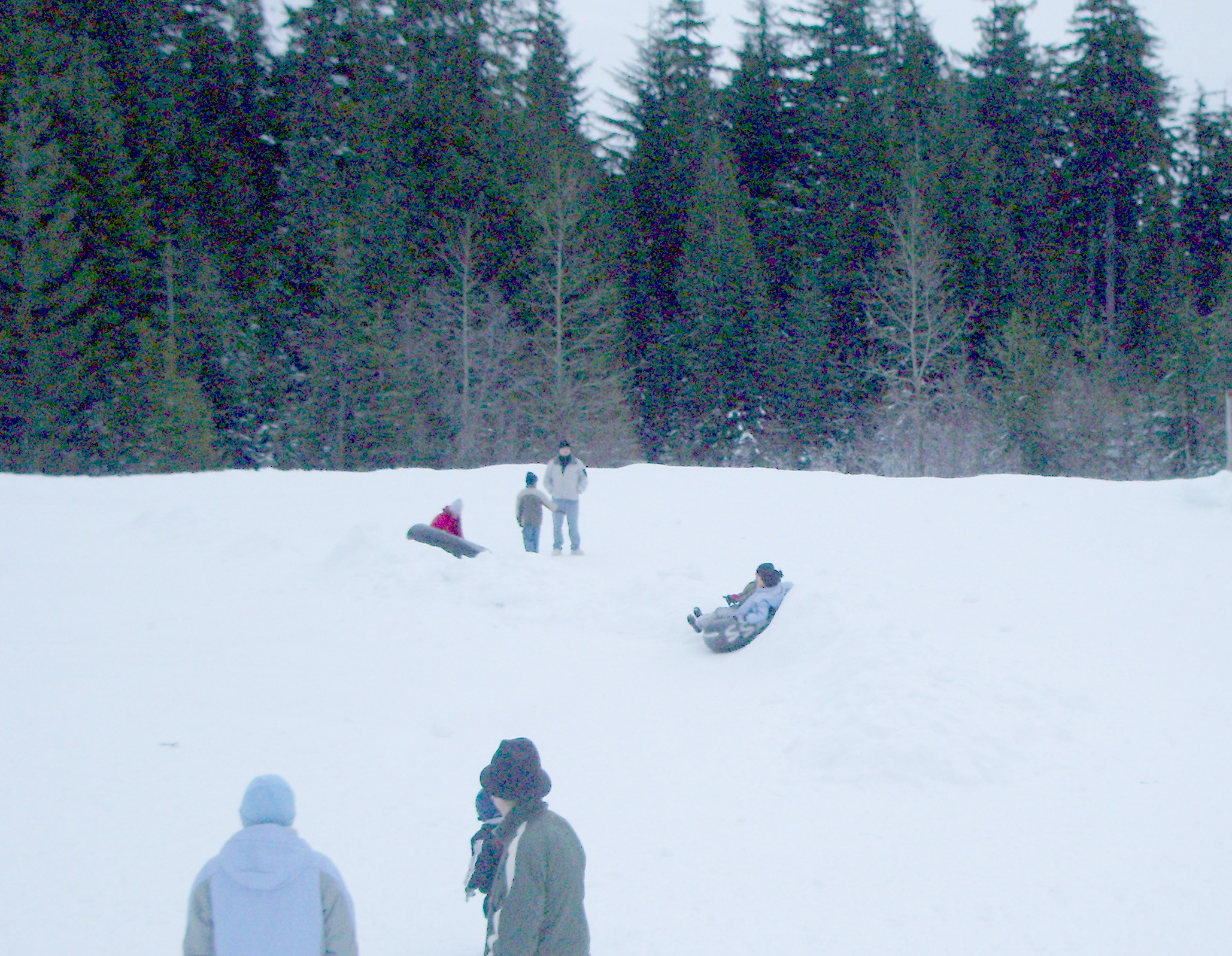
Tubing runout beside concession at Snow Bunny

Snow Bunny is a small snow play area in Mount Hood National Forest on the south face of Mount Hood in Oregon, United States, about 65 miles (105 km) east of Portland. Inner tubing, tobogganing and other snow sports are on a maintained 20-foot (6.1 m) to 30-foot (9.1 m) hill of snow, popular with young children and families. It was established in 1952 as Mount Hood's first snow play area for children.

== History ==
The East Leg Timberline Road—the road through Snow Bunny—was the original road to Timberline Lodge since its construction in 1936. In 1949, Timberline Highway opened and obsoleted winter use of East Leg Road and the Timberline Lodge garage at its foot at Route 26. In 1952, George W. Jackson led about 150 volunteers from East Side Commercial Club to convert the garage to a snow lodge intended as a safe place for children away from congested and dangerous ski areas.

The lodge opened February 1, 1953, with meals, a children's playroom, and warming rooms on weekends during snow months. The Commercial Club sponsored a nonprofit organization called Snow Bunny Lodge Incorporated that operated the lodge from 1977 until 1992. During the week, it was available for youth groups. The lodge also offered overnight accommodations for up to 66 people, while it could hold 300 during the daytime.

In the early 1990s plans were made to renovate the lodge. The building had developed dry rot, plus the fire suppression system was inadequate and the building contained the known carcinogen asbestos. The U.S. Forest Service received a federal grant of $250,000 to remodel the structure, but returned the grant after estimates for repair exceeded $700,000. In October 1992, the Forest Service tore down the lodge due to those safety concerns and burned the remnants. The non-profit group operating the tubing area, which is on public land, stopped operating the area when the lodge was demolished, but Northwest Nordic acquired a lease from the Forest Service in 1992 and began operating Snow Bunny. At that time the area drew 25,000 visitors each year.

== Operations ==
Snow Bunny's elevation of 3,816 feet (1,163 m) makes it a popular trailhead for cross country skiers (Nordic skiing), snowshoers and snowmobilers. This includes access to Trillium Lake and the Yellowjacket Trail.

The facility is operated by the company that runs the Summit Ski Area (Northwest Nordic) located 2 miles west on U.S. Route 26. It is located along the Mount Hood Scenic Byway, about 2 miles (3.2 km) east of Government Camp on U.S. Route 26, near the junction with the Trillium Lake road (NFS 2656) and East Leg Road which connects to Timberline Highway, near the junction with Oregon Route 35. Neither forest road is plowed, making them popular winter sports choices.

Inner tubing and other sliding is usually possible from Thanksgiving through spring break. The concession operates winter weekends and most school holidays. When operating, no personal sliding equipment is permitted. The fee covers unlimited day use. A Sno-Park permit is required to park. Snow Bunny features a single rope tow.
