= Burnt Lake =

Lake in Oregon, United States

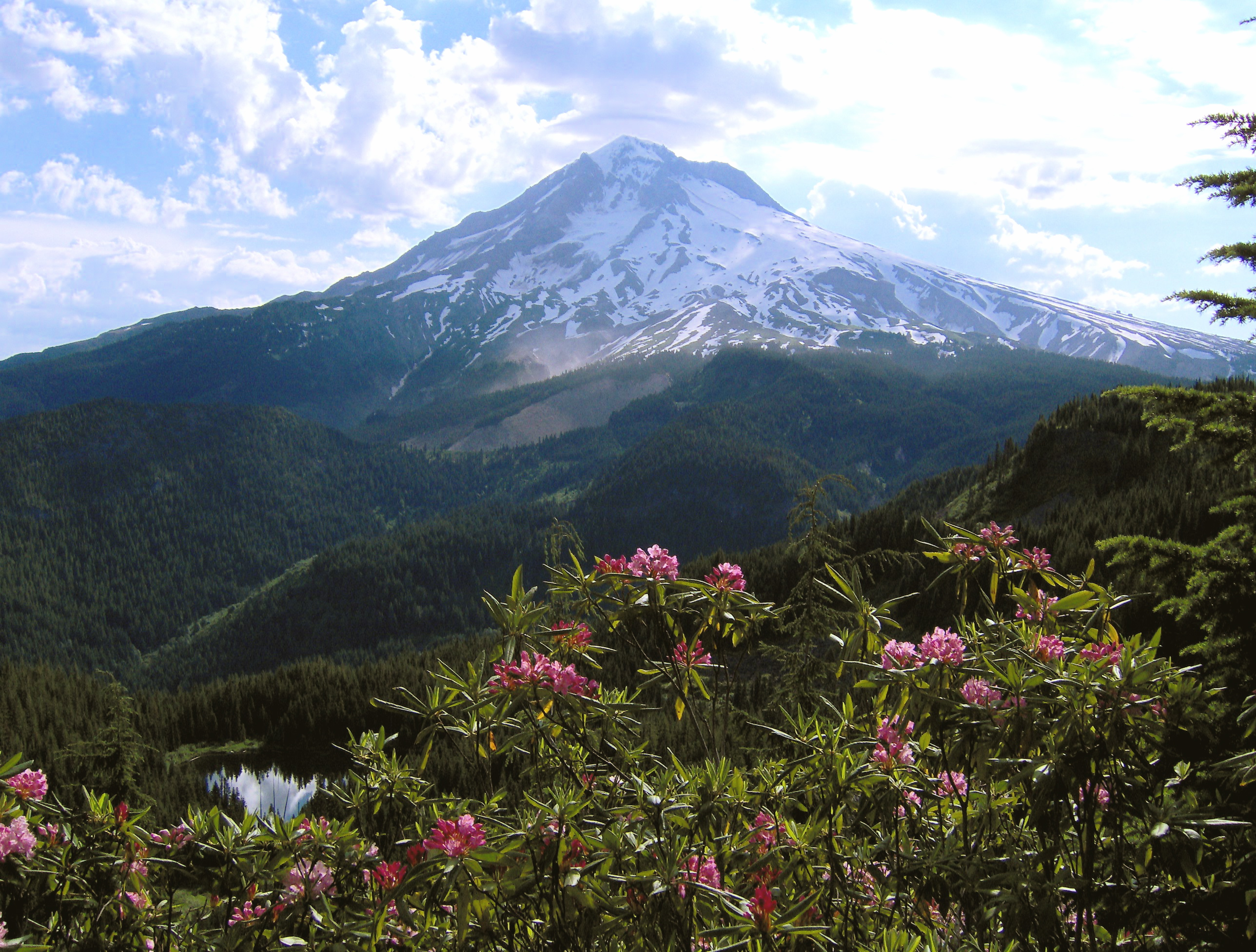
- Burnt Lake (bottom left) from Zig Zag point on the Pacific Crest Trail. Mount Hood dominates the view.

- Location of Burnt Lake in Oregon, USA. Burnt Lake (the United States)
- Location: Mount Hood National Forest, Clackamas County, Oregon
- Coordinates: 45°21′02″N 121°48′10″W
- Basin countries: United States
- Surface elevation: 4,111 ft (1,253 m)

Burnt Lake is a lake in the Mount Hood National Forest in Oregon, United States. It is in the Sandy River watershed.

== See also ==
- List of lakes in Oregon
