= Grasshopper Fire =

2026 wildfire in the U.S. state of Oregon

- Date: July 24, 2026
- Location: Hood River & Wasco Counties, Oregon, United States
- Coordinates: 45.3123°N 121.3382°W

Statistics
- Status: Ongoing wildfire
- Perimeter: 98% contained as of September 20, 2026
- Burned area: 93,971 acres (38,029 ha)

Impacts
- Structures destroyed: 21

Map
- Perimeter map of Grasshopper Fire (map data)

The Grasshopper Fire is an ongoing wildfire in the U.S. state of Oregon, east of Mt. Hood. The fire has destroyed six homes and fifteen other structures.

As of August 25, 2026, the fire was reported to have burned over 93,000 acres, with much of the acreage burned within the Badger Creek Wilderness.

== Impact ==
The 2026 Wasco County Fair was cancelled on August 11 due to the Grasshopper fire, as the part of Wasco County it would have taken place in fell under mandatory evacuation orders.
