= BARK (organization) =

- Formation: 1999; 27 years ago
- Founder: Greg Dyson; John "Lenny" Rancher
- Type: NGO
- Legal status: Non-profit, 501c3
- Purpose: Watchdog, educational
- Headquarters: Portland, Oregon, United States
- Official language: English
- Executive Director: Nakisha Nathan
- Associate Director: Courtney Rae
- Staff Attorney: Brenna Bell
- Board of directors: President: Chet Lee; Secretary: Lo Goldberg; Board members: Amy Harwood; Kari Koch; Matt Mavko; Carolyn Sweeney; David Osborn;
- Volunteers: 500
- Website: bark-out.org

BARK is an Oregon, United States, non-profit organization that was created to combat logging, clear-cutting, deforestation and projects members say cause "commercial destruction" in Oregon forests, specifically those of the Mt. Hood National Forest.

== Formation ==
In 1993, Greg Dyson and John "Lenny" Rancher began a "call to action" when they noticed clear-cutting happening on Mt. Hood National Forest, which surrounds the Mt. Hood stratovolcano in northern Oregon that is part of the Cascade Volcanic Arc. Upset with the old growth logging and the environmental impact of clear-cutting, Dyson and Rancher began training volunteers to bring attention to destructive logging practices. The two began to hike to each proposed timber sale in the forest and documenting the discrepancy between agency documents and on the ground conditions in the forest. Bark continues this foundational program by training "groundtruthers" to hike every timber sale proposed in the forest. The group began its foray into research and activism with many members canvassing the area. Since its formation, BARK has trained thousands of volunteers.

== Activity ==
BARK uses a watchdog and educational style of operation to try and protect Mt. Hood National Forest and its surrounding regions. Members utilize the media to spread awareness about projects that are happening they deem destructive. BARK has also brought lawsuits against the Forest Service to stop projects when public pressure is not enough.

The group often partners with other conservationist organizations, including the Pacific Rivers Council. They are supported by the Ben & Jerry's Foundation, Bullitt Foundation, Burning Foundation, Charlotte Martin Foundation, EarthShare Oregon, Norcross Wildlife Foundation, The Wilderness Society and many other foundations and businesses.

As of 2014, BARK was still battling with the state and Nestlé to prevent a bottling plant at the Cascade Locks that Nestlé proposes building. BARK's position is that the $50-million, 250,000-square-foot water bottling plant would take public water and give it to a private corporation. BARK testified before the state with their concerns, with State Representative Mark Johnson calling their arguments "weak".

=== BARK v. United States Forest Service ===
In 2014, BARK brought a lawsuit against the United States Forest Service in which it challenged the Forest Service issuing special use permits and that the issuance of those permits allowed concessionaires to charge restricted fees which were in violation of the Federal Lands Recreation Enhancement Act. The judge ruled that the limit on fees does not apply to third-party concessionaires. This meant that parks could continue charging fees above what the Federal Lands Recreation Enhancement Act allowed, and that BARK lost its case.

Of the decision, Board of Directors President Amy Harwood stated, "There's a lot of people who will pay it. (Concessionaires) are not going to charge it if people aren't willing to pay it. But the question is, who's paying it? You end up changing the demographic of the people who are able to use that public land. That's just wrong to me. I think national forests are something that make even the most broke person among us feel rich."

=== Jazz timber sale ===
In 2011, the Forest Service announced its intention to log parts of Mt. Hood on the Collawash River Watershed in the southern end of the Mt. Hood National Forest. According to the Forest Service, "The purpose of this project is to thin second-growth plantations to achieve multiple objectives. Thinning would occur in matrix, late-successional reserves and riparian reserves." The Jazz Sale proposed to log about 2,000 acres and rebuild 12 miles of decommissioned roads. In July 2013, BARK filed a lawsuit challenging the Forest Service that they did not comply with the National Environmental Policy Act (NEPA) and National Forest Management Act (NFMA) with its decision to log this geologically unstable watershed. BARK argued that the 12 miles of temporary roads would reactive large-scale soil shifts called "earthflows" and that the logging was not in the best interest of the forest but rather for the timber profit.

U.S. District Judge Marco Hernandez ruled that, contrary to BARK's claim, the Forest Service did study alternative methods of extracting trees, including helicopter logging. The Forest Service did acknowledge during the argument that an additional 19 tons of sediment would be deposited into streams around the area. BARK program director Russ Plaeger stated "This Collawash River is a critical habitat for threatened Coho salmon" and that the sediment from the logging would be detrimental for them. In April 2014, Judge Hernandez agreed with the Forest Service that any environmental impact would be inconsequential and ruled that logging could begin.
