= Trillium Lake =

Lake in Oregon, United States

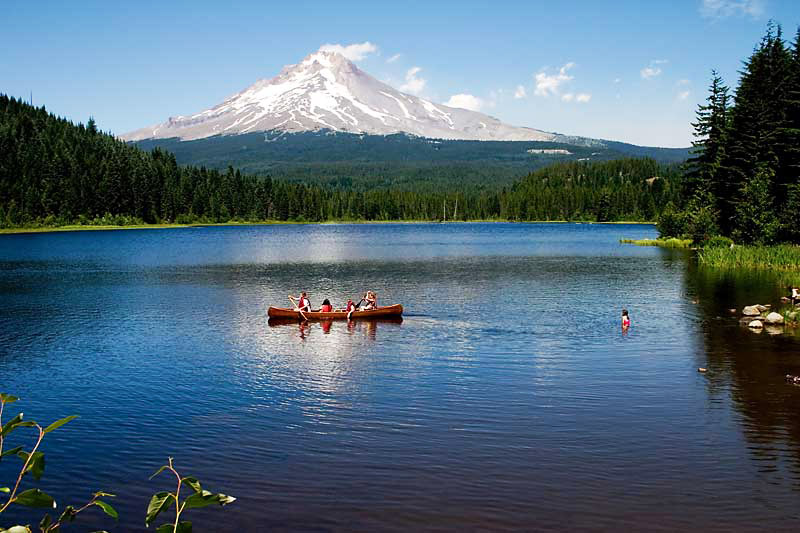
- Mount Hood seen from the lake

- Location within Oregon Location within the United States
- Location: Clackamas County, Oregon, United States
- Coordinates: 45°16′02″N 121°44′32″W
- Type: man made
- Primary inflows: none
- Primary outflows: Mud Creek
- Catchment area: 1 sq mi (2.6 km^{2})
- Basin countries: United States
- Max. length: 3,000 ft (910 m)
- Max. width: 1,400 ft (430 m)
- Surface area: 65 acres (26 ha)
- Average depth: 7 ft (2.1 m)
- Max. depth: 21 ft (6.4 m)
- Water volume: 380 acre⋅ft (470,000 m^{3})
- Surface elevation: 3,601 ft (1,098 m)
- Islands: 0
- Settlements: (none)

Trillium Lake is a lake situated 7.5 miles (12.1 km) south-southwest of Mount Hood in the U.S. state of Oregon. It is formed by a dam at the headwaters of Mud Creek, tributary to the Salmon River. It was created by the state Department of Fish and Wildlife in 1960.

The area which is now the lake was part of the Barlow Road, a component of the Oregon Trail. A log road across marshes allowed immigrants to pass to Summit Meadow, which was a toll station 1866—1870. Trillium is a genus of flowers particularly noticeable in the area.

The lake is popular for fishing, camping and photography, often clearly reflecting Mount Hood. Adjacent Trillium Lake Campground is administered by the Zigzag Ranger District of the Mount Hood National Forest. The large campground features a seasonal boat ramp and wheelchair-accessible floating dock. The lake is a very popular Nordic skiing destination from a trailhead across U.S. Route 26 from Snow Bunny. Some resources note its popularity on afternoons and weekends. Trillium Lake is circled by the 2 miles (3.2 km) long Trillium Lake Trail.

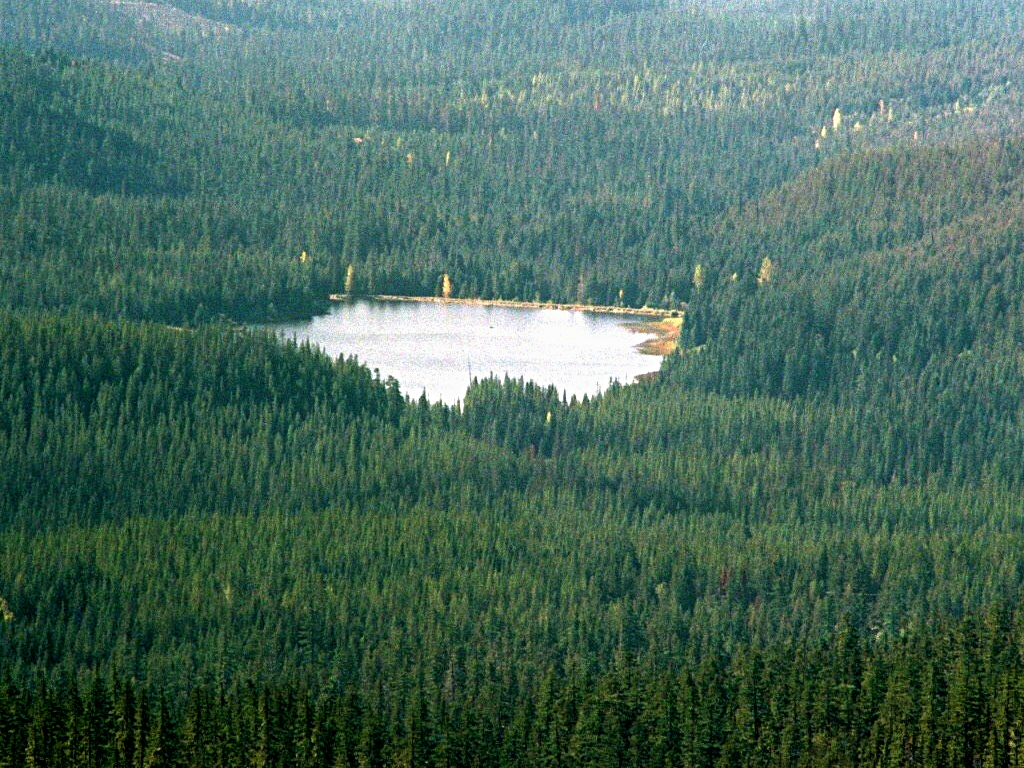
The lake from Mount Hood

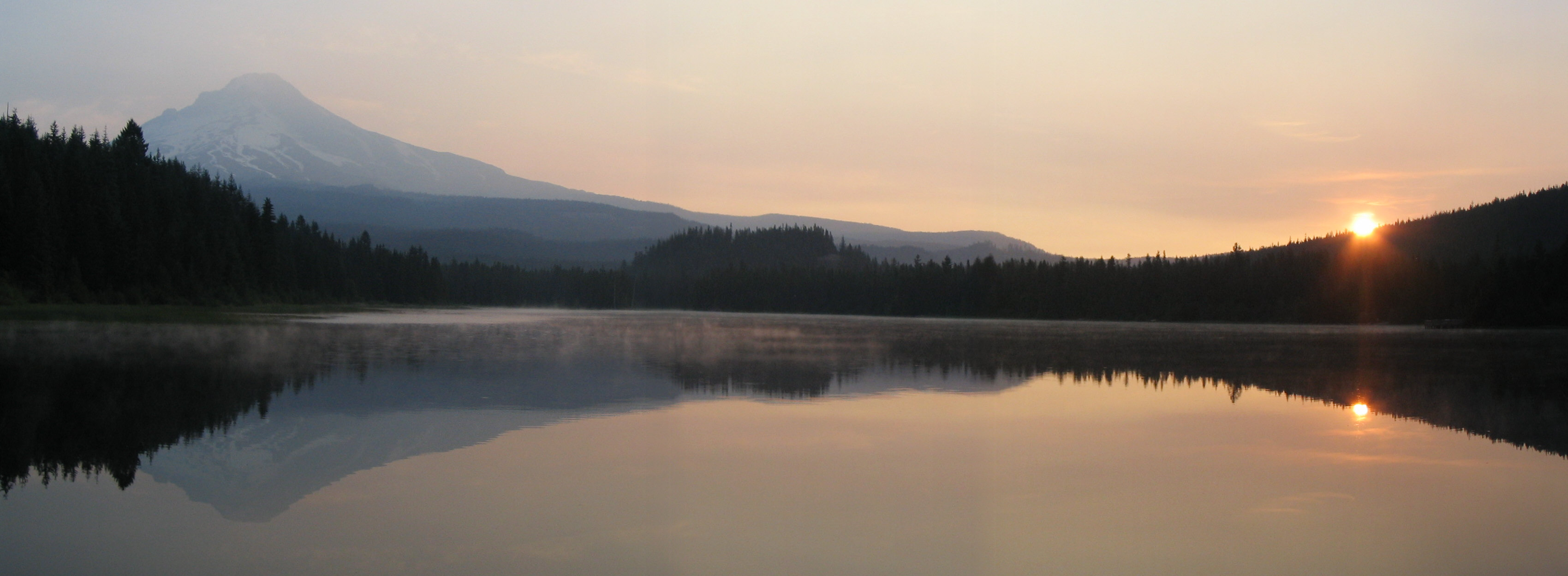
The lake at sunrise

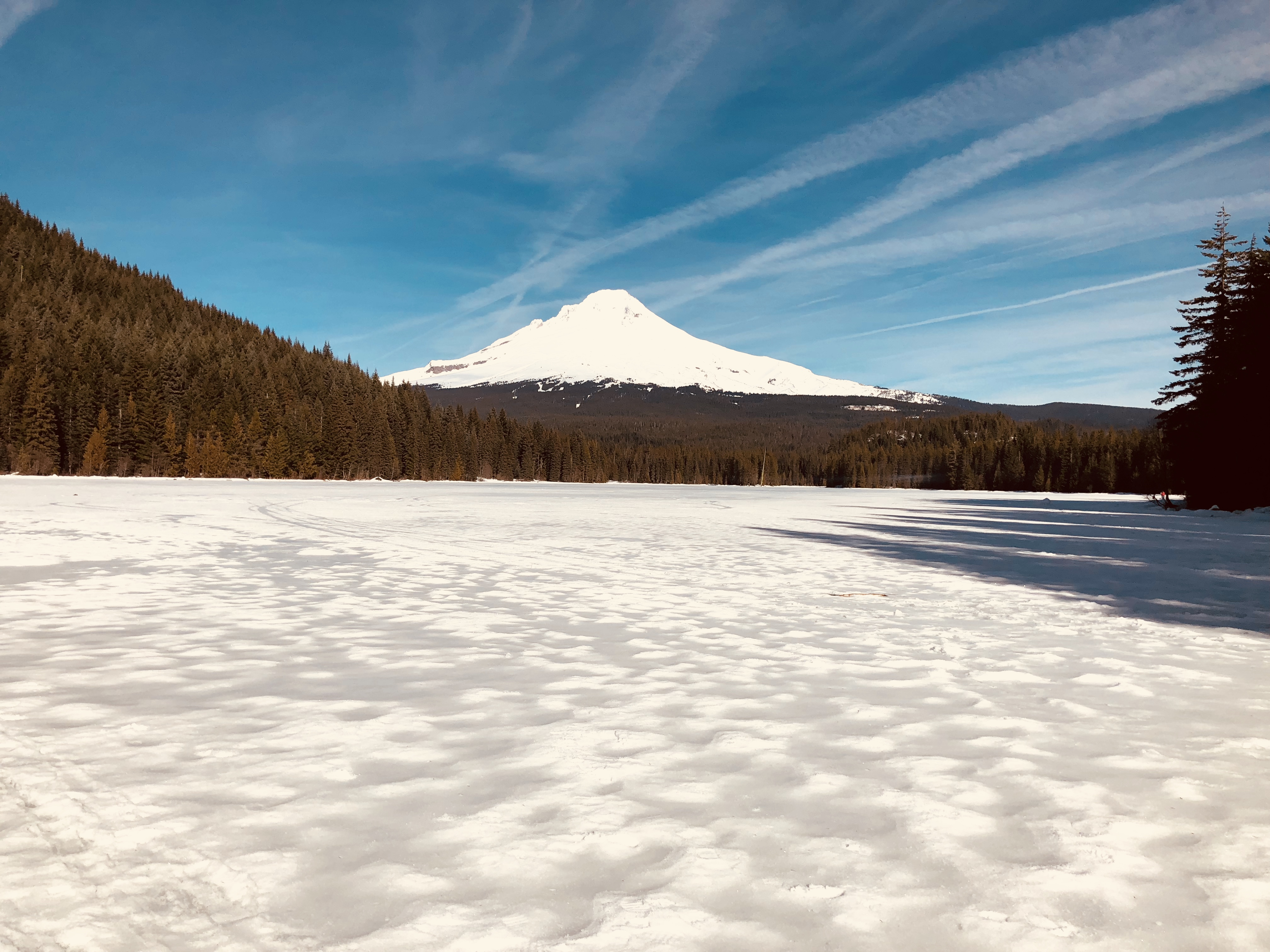
The lake in winter

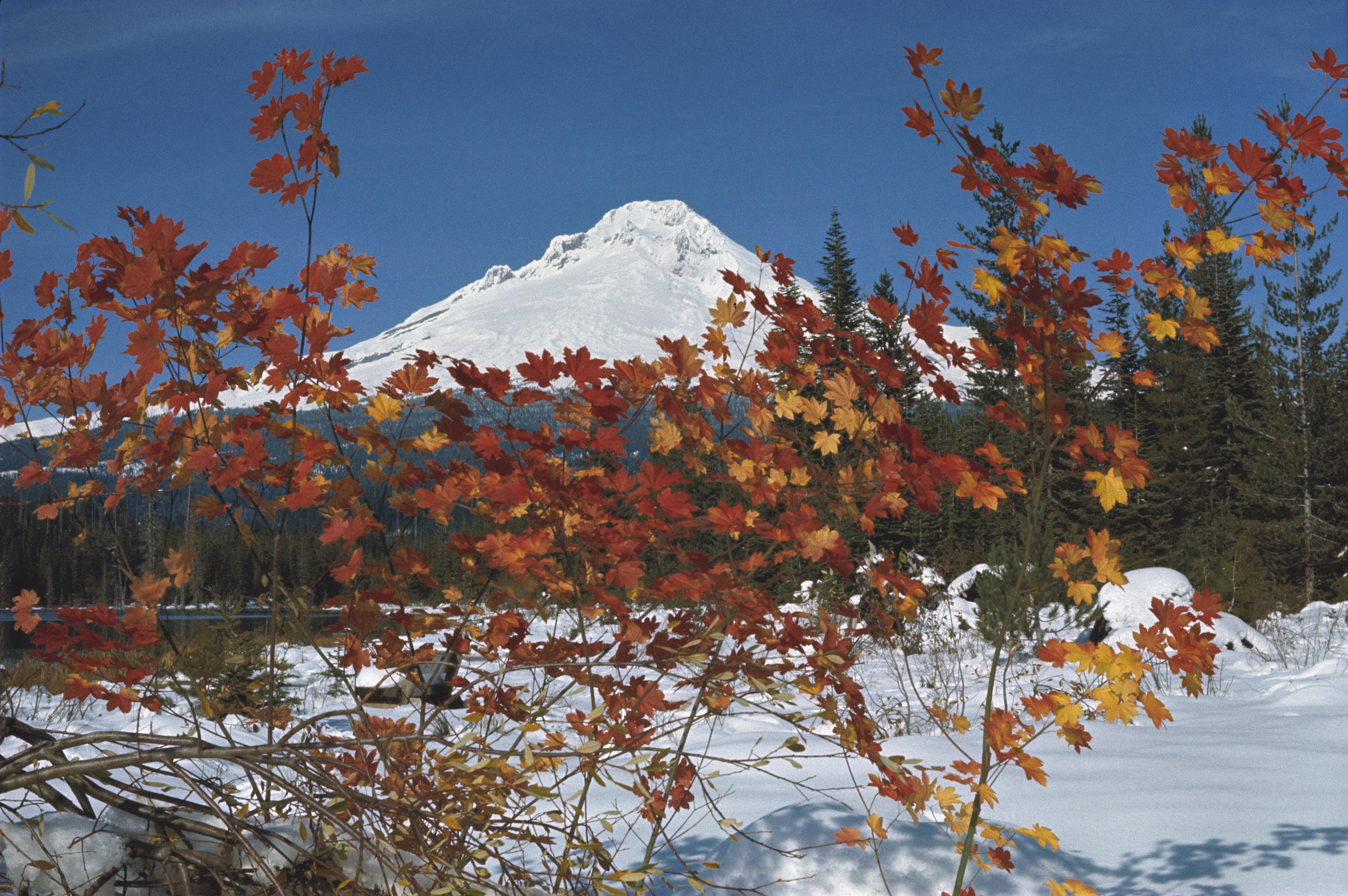
View of Mt. Hood from the lake

== See also ==
- List of lakes in Oregon
