= Mark O. Hatfield Wilderness =

Wilderness area on the northern side of Mount Hood in Oregon

- IUCN category Ib (wilderness area)
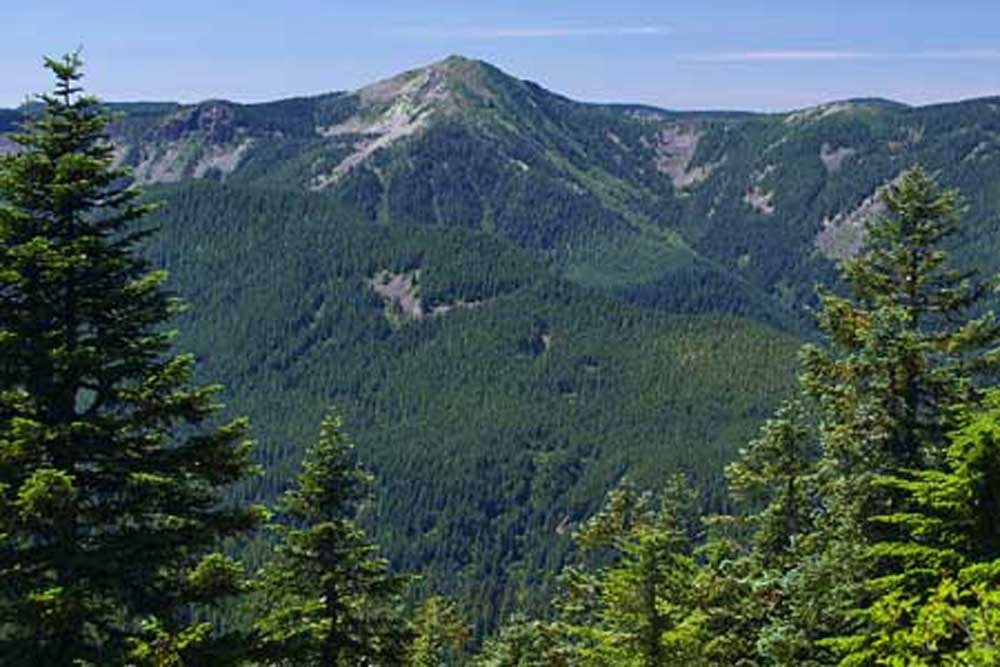

- Location within the United States
- Location: Hood River / Multnomah counties, Oregon, USA
- Nearest city: Hood River, Oregon
- Coordinates: 45°35′49″N 121°51′11″W
- Area: 65,822 acres (26,637 ha)
- Established: 1984
- Governing body: U.S. Forest Service

The Mark O. Hatfield Wilderness is a wilderness area located on the northern side of Mount Hood in the northwestern Cascades of the U.S. state of Oregon, near the Columbia River Gorge and within Mount Hood National Forest. Prior to Wilderness designation it was known as the Columbia Gorge Recreation Area.

The slopes of the Wilderness rise steeply to a slightly uneven plateau and on to mountain peaks, talus slopes, and lakes with elevations ranging from approximately 100 feet (30 m) near the river to 4,900 feet (1,500 m) on Mount Defiance. The main waterways in the Wilderness are Herman Creek, Eagle Creek, and Tanner Creek.

== Geology ==
Groves of old growth Douglas-fir, hemlock and cedar grow in lower elevations of the Mark O. Hatfield Wilderness. The north part of the Wilderness has features characteristic of the Columbia River Gorge, such as towering basaltic cliffs and many waterfalls. Higher elevations are home to forested plateaus and ridges with hanging meadows, subalpine lakes, and panoramic views of the Cascade Range and the Columbia River Gorge.

== Recreation ==
Common recreational activities in the Mark O. Hatfield Wilderness include camping, backpacking, wildlife watching, and hiking the approximately 200 miles (320 km) of trails in the Wilderness, including some 14 miles (23 km) of the Pacific Crest Trail. The area's close proximity to Portland makes this a somewhat popular destination. The area was named for former United States senator and Oregon governor Mark Hatfield.

== See also ==
- List of Oregon Wildernesses
- List of U.S. Wilderness Areas
- Old growth
- List of old growth forests
- Wilderness Act
