= Badger Creek (Des Moines River tributary) =

Stream in Iowa, U.S.

Coordinates: 42°34′43″N 94°12′26″W

Badger Creek is a stream in Webster and Humboldt counties, Iowa, in the United States. It is a tributary of the Des Moines River.

Badger Creek was so named from a badger who fought a dog at the creek.

== See also ==
- List of rivers of Iowa
