= Badger Creek (Blue Earth River tributary) =

Stream in Faribault and Martin County, Minnesota, U.S.

Coordinates: 43°37′36.29″N 94°9′32.09″W

Badger Creek is a stream in Faribault and Martin counties, in the U.S. state of Minnesota. It is a tributary of the Blue Earth River.

Badger Creek was named for the badgers once hunted in the area for their fur.

== See also ==
- List of rivers of Minnesota
