= Salmon–Huckleberry Wilderness =

Wilderness area in Oregon, United States

- IUCN category Ib (wilderness area)
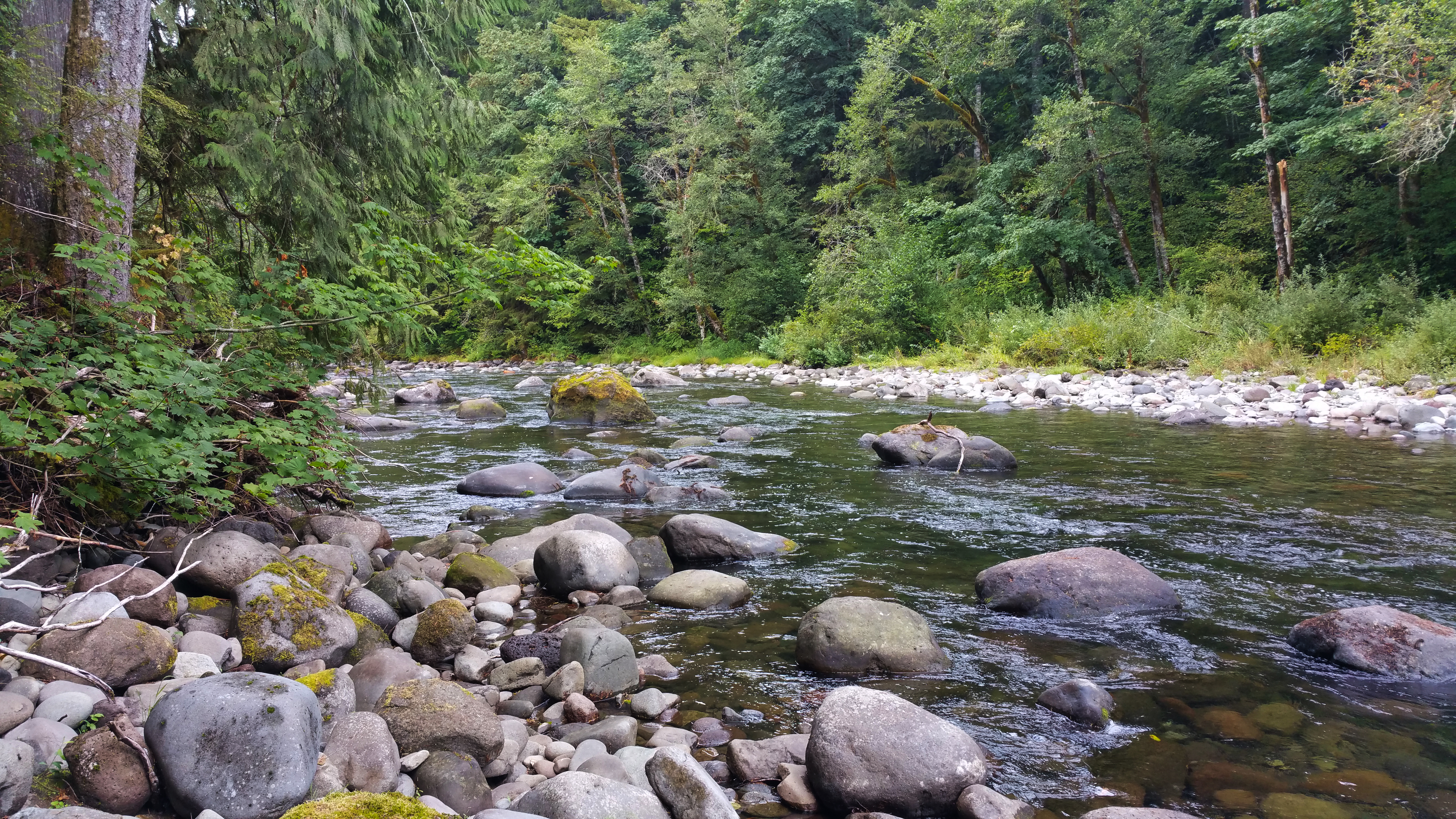
- The Salmon River, originating in the wilderness area

- Location within the United States
- Location: Clackamas County, Oregon, United States
- Nearest city: Zigzag, Oregon
- Coordinates: 45°16′40″N 121°58′37″W
- Area: 62,061 acres (25,115 ha)
- Established: 1984
- Governing body: United States Forest Service

The Salmon–Huckleberry Wilderness is a wilderness area located on the southern side of Mount Hood in the northwestern Cascades of Oregon, in the United States. It lies within the Mount Hood National Forest and comprises 62,061 acres (25,115 ha) of land. The United States Congress designated the area Wilderness in 1984.

== Geography ==
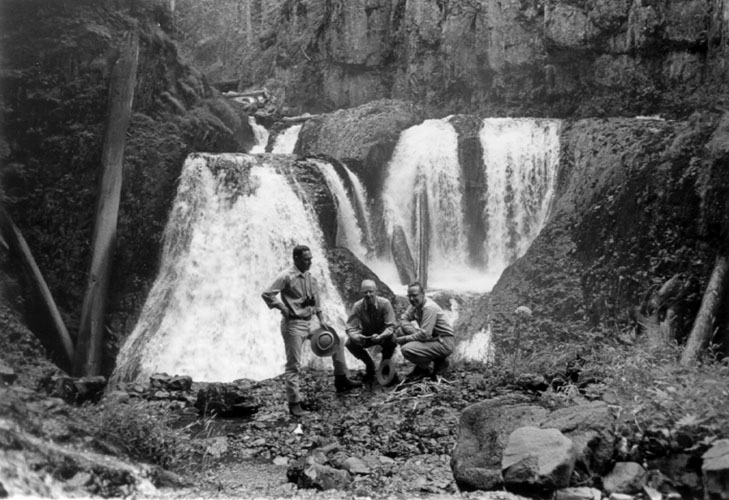
OGNB Members at "Frustration Falls", Salmon River Gorge.

The ridges in the Salmon–Huckleberry Wilderness belong to the Western Cascades (Old Cascades), a broad volcanic mountain range that erupted 10 million years before the High Cascades. Devils Peak and Salmon Butte are likely remnants of once-tall volcanoes, but have been reduced to ridges by the millennia of ice and water erosion. The wilderness contains several U-shaped valleys formed by glacial activity.

The drainages of the South Fork Salmon River and Eagle Creek are found in the Salmon–Huckleberry Wilderness, and volcanic plugs, pinnacles, and cliffs distinguish the area's sharply dissected ridges. Much of the water in the area runs off Huckleberry Mountain in the northern portion of the Wilderness. To the south is Salmon Butte, a 4,877-foot (1,487 m) butte that can be hiked via a trail to the top.

== Vegetation ==
The Salmon–Huckleberry Wilderness is covered in a dense rain forest of Douglas fir, fir, western red cedar, red alder, and western hemlock, including some old growth. Rare Alaska cedar grow on the fringes of meadows along the Salmon River. Huckleberries grow in abundance in several areas of the wilderness, including Huckleberry Mountain.

== Wildlife ==
Eagle Creek and the Salmon River, a designated Wild and Scenic River, both provide excellent habitat for steelhead, Chinook and coho salmon, as well as wild cutthroat trout. Black-tailed deer and black bears find winter range in the area's rugged lower canyons. In 2018, officials reported that a cougar was responsible for the death of a hiker in this region.

== Recreation ==
Popular recreational activities in the Salmon–Huckleberry Wilderness include hiking, camping, cross-country skiing, berry-picking, and wildlife watching. There are several primitive campsites and relatively popular trails in the wilderness, including the Salmon River Trail, which follows the Salmon River beyond the wilderness boundary.

== See also ==
- List of old growth forests
- List of Oregon Wildernesses
- List of U.S. Wilderness Areas
