= Mount Hood National Forest =

National forest in Oregon, United States

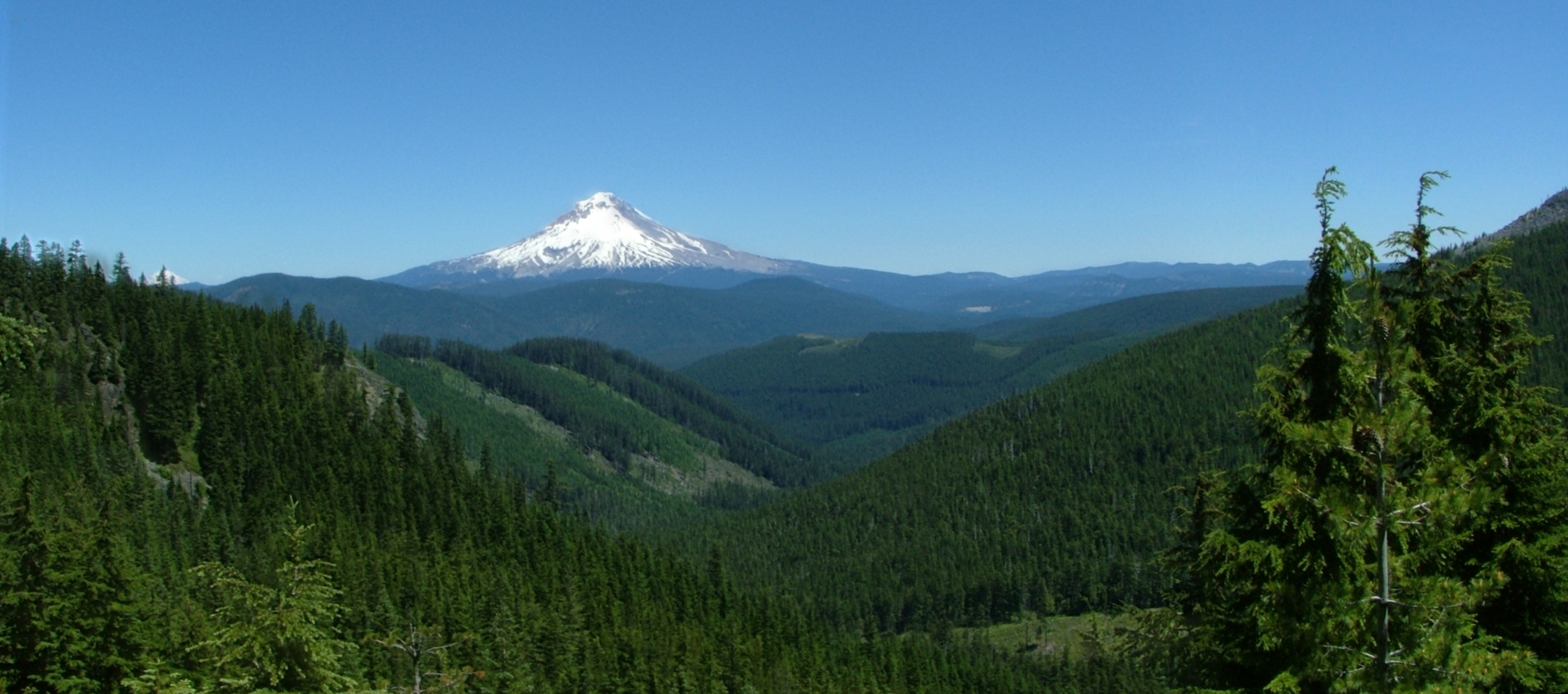
- Snow-covered Mount Hood in the Mount Hood National Forest

- Location within the United States
- Location: Oregon, U.S.
- Nearest city: Government Camp, Oregon
- Coordinates: 45°22′14″N 121°42′14″W
- Area: 1,071,466 acres (4,336.07 km^{2})
- Established: July 1, 1908
- Visitors: 4.4 million (in 2006)
- Governing body: U.S. Forest Service
- Website: Mount Hood National Forest

The Mount Hood National Forest is a U.S. National Forest in the U.S. state of Oregon, located 62 miles (100 km) east of the city of Portland and the northern Willamette River valley. The Forest extends south from the Columbia River Gorge across more than 60 miles (97 km) of forested mountains, lakes and streams to the Olallie Scenic Area, a high lake basin under the slopes of Mount Jefferson. The Forest includes and is named after Mount Hood, a stratovolcano and the highest mountain in the state.

The Forest encompasses some 1,067,043 acres (4,318.17 km^{2}). Forest headquarters are located in Sandy, Oregon.

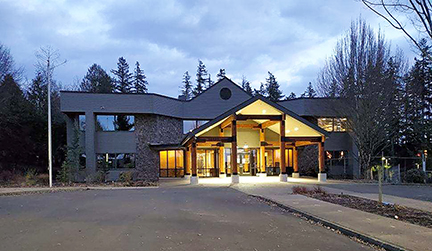
The headquarters building of the Mount Hood National Forest

A 1993 Forest Service study estimated that the extent of old growth in the Forest was 345,300 acres (139,700 ha). The Forest is divided into four separate districts – Barlow (with offices in Dufur), Clackamas River (Sandy), Hood River (Mount Hood-Parkdale), and Zigzag (Zigzag).

In descending order of land area, the Mount Hood National Forest is located in parts of Clackamas, Hood River, Wasco, Multnomah, Marion, and Jefferson counties.

== History ==
Mount Hood National Forest was first established as the Bull Run Forest Reserve in 1892. It was expanded in 1893. It was merged with part of Cascade National Forest on July 1, 1908, and named Oregon National Forest with 1,787,280 acres (7,232.9 km^{2}). It extended from the Columbia River to the South Fork of the Santiam River until 1911 when the Santiam National Forest was proclaimed and the southern border of the Oregon National Forest was moved north to the divide between the Santiam River and Clackamas River. The name was changed again to the Mount Hood National Forest in 1924.

In 1940 it was under consideration to become Mount Hood National Park, but this proposal did not materialize. A modern campaign opposed to logging in the national forest revived the push for national park status along with the Columbia River Gorge.

The 1952 film Bend of the River was partly shot in the Mount Hood National Forest.

In 2010, the Mount Hood National Forest was honored with its own quarter under the America the Beautiful Quarters program.

== Recreation ==
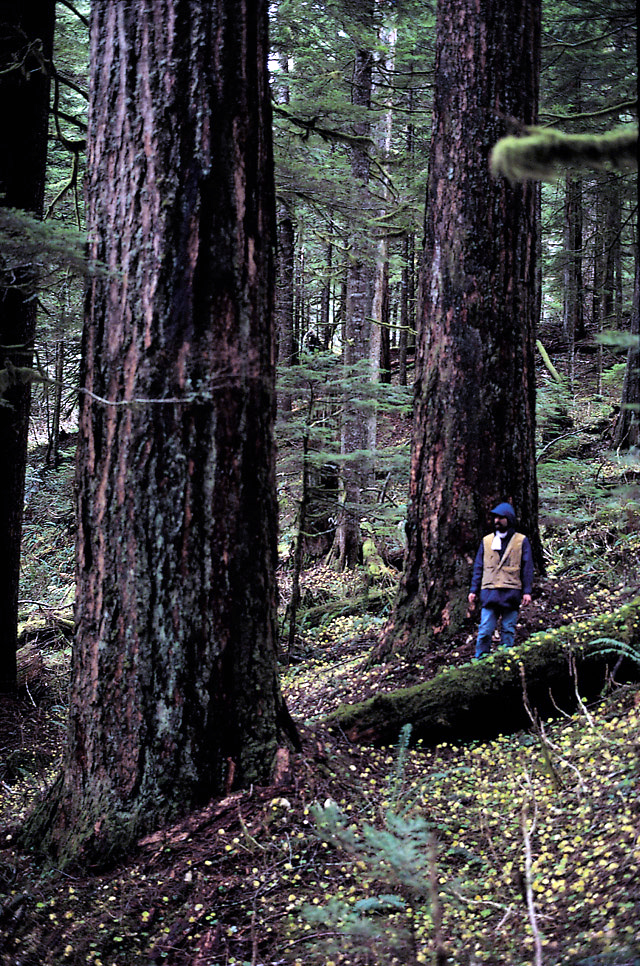
Old-growth Douglas Fir in the Mount Hood National Forest

The Mount Hood National Forest is one of the most-visited National Forests in the United States, with over four million visitors annually. Less than five percent of the visitors camp in the forest. The forest contains 170 developed recreation sites, including:

- Timberline Lodge, built in 1937 high on Mount Hood
- Lost Lake
- Burnt Lake
- Trillium Lake
- Timothy Lake
- Rock Creek Reservoir
- The Old Oregon Trail, including Barlow Road

Other common recreational activities in the Mount Hood National Forest include fishing, boating, hiking, hunting, rafting, horseback riding, skiing, mountain biking, berry-picking, and mushroom collecting. A portion of the Pacific Crest Trail passes through the National Forest on the flanks of the mountain. Mount Hood is a popular destination for mountain climbers.

Several nonprofits lead free hikes into the National Forest to build support for further protection from logging and off-road vehicle use, including BARK and Oregon Wild.

Mount Hood National Recreation Area was established within the Mount Hood National Forest on March 30, 2009. The recreation area comprises three separate units.

== Wilderness ==
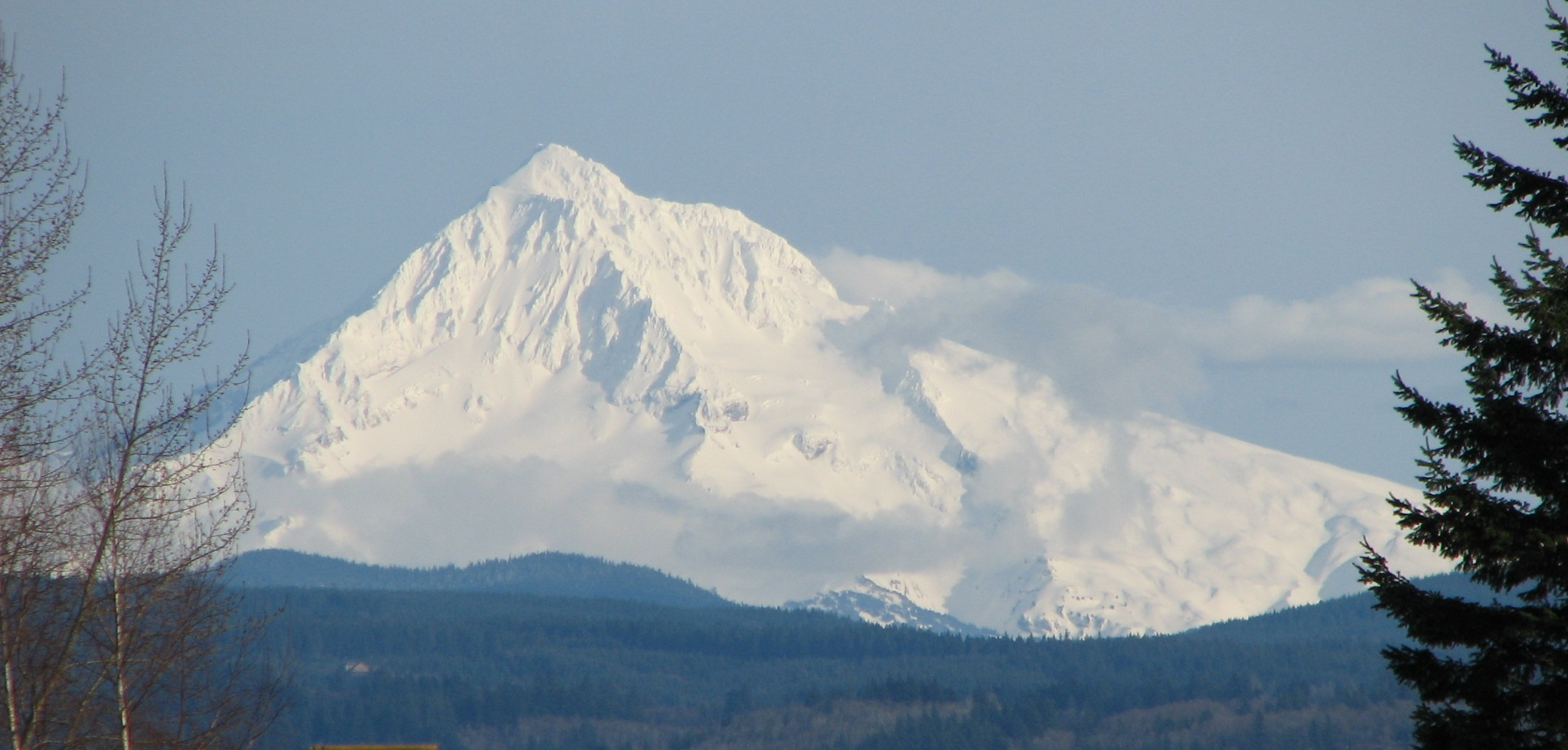
Mount Hood (3429m) in 2006

There are eight officially designated wilderness areas within the Mount Hood National Forest collectively adding up to 311,448 acres that are part of the National Wilderness Preservation System. Acreages are as of 2011.

- Badger Creek Wilderness at 29,057 acres (118 km^{2})
- Bull of the Woods Wilderness at 36,731 acres (149 km^{2})
- Clackamas Wilderness at 9,181 acres (37 km^{2})
- Lower White River Wilderness at 1,743 acres (7 km^{2}) not counting 1,063 acres (4 km^{2}) on BLM land
- Mark O. Hatfield Wilderness at 65,822 acres (266 km^{2})
- Mount Hood Wilderness at 63,177 acres (256 km^{2}) includes the peak and upper slopes of Mount Hood
- Roaring River Wilderness at 36,768 acres (149 km^{2})
- Salmon–Huckleberry Wilderness at 62,455 acres (253 km^{2})

The Olallie Scenic Area is a lightly roaded lake basin that also offers a primitive recreational experience.

== See also ==
- List of national forests of the United States
