= Politics of Oregon =

Politics of a U.S. state

Like many other U.S. states, the politics of Oregon largely concerns regional issues. Oregon leans Democratic as a state, with both U.S. senators from the Democratic party, as well as five out of Oregon's six U.S. Representatives. The Democratic candidate for president has won in Oregon in every election since 1988. Both houses of Oregon's legislative assembly have been under Democratic control since the 2012 elections.

For most of its existence, Oregon was the most consistently Republican west coast state. Between 1860 and 1984, the state voted Democratic just six times, in 1868, 1912, 1932, 1936, 1940, and 1964.

In 1954, the upset of incumbent Republican Senator Guy Cordon by Democrat Richard L. Neuberger, along with Democratic wins in the U.S. House and statewide races and pickups of fourteen and two seats in the state House and Senate, respectively, signaled the beginning of a shift towards the Democratic Party. The last Republican governor of Oregon was Victor G. Atiyeh, who served from 1979 to 1987. Since 1988, Oregon voters have consistently favored Democratic candidates for most major elected positions, including the U.S. presidency.

== History ==
United States presidential election results for Oregon
Year	Republican		Democratic		Third party(ies)	
Year	No.	%	No.	%	No.	%
1860	5,344	36.20%	4,131	27.99%	5,286	35.81%
1864	9,888	53.90%	8,457	46.10%	0	0.00%
1868	10,961	49.63%	11,125	50.37%	0	0.00%
1872	11,818	58.66%	7,742	38.43%	587	2.91%
1876	15,214	50.92%	14,157	47.38%	510	1.71%
1880	20,619	50.51%	19,955	48.88%	249	0.61%
1884	26,860	50.99%	24,604	46.70%	1,218	2.31%
1888	33,291	53.82%	26,522	42.88%	2,040	3.30%
1892	35,002	44.59%	14,243	18.15%	29,246	37.26%
1896	48,779	50.07%	46,739	47.98%	1,896	1.95%
1900	46,172	55.46%	32,810	39.41%	4,269	5.13%
1904	60,455	67.06%	17,521	19.43%	12,178	13.51%
1908	62,530	56.39%	38,049	34.31%	10,310	9.30%
1912	34,673	25.30%	47,064	34.34%	55,303	40.36%
1916	126,813	48.47%	120,087	45.90%	14,750	5.64%
1920	143,592	60.20%	80,019	33.55%	14,911	6.25%
1924	142,579	51.01%	67,589	24.18%	69,320	24.80%
1928	205,341	64.18%	109,223	34.14%	5,378	1.68%
1932	136,019	36.88%	213,871	57.99%	18,918	5.13%
1936	122,706	29.64%	266,733	64.42%	24,582	5.94%
1940	219,555	45.62%	258,415	53.70%	3,270	0.68%
1944	225,365	46.94%	248,635	51.78%	6,147	1.28%
1948	260,904	49.78%	243,147	46.40%	20,029	3.82%
1952	420,815	60.54%	270,579	38.93%	3,665	0.53%
1956	406,393	55.25%	329,204	44.75%	0	0.00%
1960	408,060	52.56%	367,402	47.32%	959	0.12%
1964	282,779	35.96%	501,017	63.72%	2,509	0.32%
1968	408,433	49.83%	358,866	43.78%	52,323	6.38%
1972	486,686	52.45%	392,760	42.33%	48,500	5.23%
1976	492,120	47.78%	490,407	47.62%	47,349	4.60%
1980	571,044	48.33%	456,890	38.67%	153,582	13.00%
1984	685,700	55.91%	536,479	43.74%	4,348	0.35%
1988	560,126	46.61%	616,206	51.28%	25,362	2.11%
1992	475,757	32.53%	621,314	42.48%	365,572	24.99%
1996	538,152	39.06%	649,641	47.15%	189,967	13.79%
2000	713,577	46.52%	720,342	46.96%	100,049	6.52%
2004	866,831	47.19%	943,163	51.35%	26,788	1.46%
2008	738,475	40.40%	1,037,291	56.75%	52,098	2.85%
2012	754,175	42.15%	970,488	54.24%	64,607	3.61%
2016	782,403	39.09%	1,002,106	50.07%	216,827	10.83%
2020	958,448	40.37%	1,340,383	56.45%	75,490	3.18%
2024	919,480	40.97%	1,240,600	55.27%	84,413	3.76%

Gubernatorial election results
Year	Democratic	Republican
1950	34.0% 171,750	66.0% 334,160
1954	43.1% 244,170	56.9% 322,522
1958	44.7% 267,934	55.3% 331,900
1962	41.6% 265,359	54.2% 345,497
1966	44.7% 305,008	55.3% 377,346
1970	44.2% 293,892	55.6% 369,964
1974	57.7% 444,812	42.1% 324,751
1978	45.1% 409,411	54.9% 498,452
1982	35.9% 374,316	61.4% 639,841
1986	51.9% 549,456	47.9% 506,989
1990	45.7% 508,749	40.0% 444,646
1994	51.0% 622,083	42.4% 517,874
1998	64.4% 717,061	30.0% 334,001
2002	49.0% 618,004	46.2% 581,785
2006	50.7% 699,786	42.8% 589,748
2010	49.3% 716,525	47.8% 694,287
2014	49.9% 733,230	44.1% 648,542
2016	50.6% 985,027	43.4% 845,609
2018	50.1% 934,498	43.7% 814,988
2022	47.0% 917,074	43.5% 850,347

The longest-serving governor in Oregon history is John Kitzhaber, who served two consecutive terms as governor, then left office before returning to win a third term in 2010 ahead of Republican and former Portland Trail Blazer Chris Dudley and the 2014 election against Republican Dennis Richardson. Kitzhaber resigned in February 2015 after allegations of financial impropriety involving his partner and girlfriend, Cylvia Hayes, and certain lobbying efforts.

The state is broken up into two main geographically separate political areas: the generally liberal cities and towns of the Willamette Valley and central/northern coast. The rest of the state (apart from Ashland and Bend) has voters are typically conservative or right wing. While about 47% of the population of Oregon lives in the Portland metropolitan area as of 2013, the rest of the state has a rural population with generally conservative views on state taxes. Because of the greater population living in the liberal Willamette Valley cities compared to the rest of Oregon, the state has very liberal laws, including on public health care, recreational and medical marijuana, assisted dying, and environmental protections.

In the 2016 presidential election, Democrat Hillary Clinton received 50.07% of the vote, while Republican candidate Donald Trump received 39.09%. Trump performed best in Lake County, winning 77% of the 5,400 registered voters. Hillary Clinton performed best in Multnomah County, where she received 73% of the vote. Libertarian candidate Gary Johnson performed best in Gilliam County, where he received 8% of the vote. Columbia and Tillamook counties in the far northwest of Oregon are among 181 pivot counties out of more than 3,000 counties nationwide that Barack Obama carried in 2008 and 2012, but flipped to Donald Trump in 2016 and 2020.

== Political geography ==
Oregon's politics are largely divided by the Cascade Mountains, with much of western Oregon leaning Democratic and eastern Oregon leaning Republican. The rapidly-growing area around Bend in Central Oregon has created Democratic voter registration majorities in Deschutes County. Republicans have some strongholds in the western part of the state outside of larger cities. Linn County, between the liberal cities of Eugene and Salem, has voted for the Republican presidential candidate in every election since 1980. Southern Oregon is also a Republican stronghold, except in Jackson County, which frequently votes for both Republican and Democratic candidates.

In the 1998 gubernatorial election, the only county won by Republican candidate Bill Sizemore was Malheur County. Because of the concentration of population in Portland and the Willamette Valley, Gov. Kate Brown, a Democrat, won the 2018 election despite carrying only 7 of Oregon's 36 counties.

Based on voting data from the 2012 presidential election, Ontario in Malheur County was rated as the most Republican in the state. Gresham in Multnomah County was rated as the most Democratic.

The last time a Democrat won every county in the state in a presidential election was in 1936, when Franklin D. Roosevelt carried all counties. The last time a Republican accomplished this feat was in 1928, when every county was won by Herbert Hoover. The last time a third-party candidate won any county was in 1912, when Theodore Roosevelt carried Clatsop, Columbia, Jackson, and Washington counties on the Progressive ticket. Independent candidate Ross Perot won 24.7% of the 1992 presidential vote in Oregon, but carried no counties.

=== Ideology ===
Similar to the West Coast states of California and Washington, Oregon has a high percentage of people who identify as liberals. A 2013 Gallup poll that surveyed the political ideology of residents in every state found that people in Oregon identified as:

- 34.8% moderate
- 33.6% conservative
- 27.9% liberal

A 2008 analysis by political statistician Nate Silver on states' political ideology noted that the state's conservatives were the most conservative of any state (more so than Utah or Tennessee) and that the state's liberals were more liberal than any state (more so than Vermont or D.C.).

== Political parties ==
Party registration by county (October 2018): Democrat >= 30%; Democrat >= 40%; Democrat >= 50%; Republican >= 30%; Republican >= 40%; Republican >= 50%; Unaffiliated >= 30%

According to the state's election agency, as of September 2022, there were 2,995,364 registered voters in Oregon.

Party registration as of June 2025:
Party	Number of voters	Percentage
Non-affiliated	1,099,989	36.15%
Democratic	993,479	32.65%
Republican	732,070	24.05%
Independent	153,082	5.03%
Libertarian	19,416	0.64%
Minor parties	44,729	1.47%
Total	3,042,762	100%

== Federal representation ==
Oregon currently has six House districts. In the 119th Congress, five of Oregon's seats are held by Democrats and one is held by a Republican:

- Oregon's 1st congressional district represented by Suzanne Bonamici (D)
- Oregon's 2nd congressional district represented by Cliff Bentz (R)
- Oregon's 3rd congressional district represented by Maxine Dexter (D)
- Oregon's 4th congressional district represented by Val Hoyle (D)
- Oregon's 5th congressional district represented by Janelle Bynum (D)
- Oregon's 6th congressional district represented by Andrea Salinas (D)

Oregon's two United States senators are Democrats Ron Wyden and Jeff Merkley, serving since 1996 and 2009, respectively.

Oregon is part of the United States District Court for the District of Oregon in the federal judiciary. The district's cases are appealed to the San Francisco-based United States Court of Appeals for the Ninth Circuit.

== See also ==
- Political party strength in Oregon
