= 2008 United States presidential election in Oregon =

- November 4, 2008

Nominee	Barack Obama	John McCain
Party	Democratic	Republican
Home state	Illinois	Arizona
Running mate	Joe Biden	Sarah Palin
Electoral vote	7	0
Popular vote	1,037,291	738,475
Percentage	56.75%	40.40%

Obama
40–50%
50–60%
60–70%
70–80%
McCain
40–50%
50–60%
60–70%
70–80%
President before election
George W. Bush
Republican
Elected President
Barack Obama
Democratic

The 2008 United States presidential election in Oregon took place on November 4, 2008, and was part of the 2008 United States presidential election. Voters chose seven representatives, or electors to the Electoral College, who voted for president and vice president.

Oregon was won by Democratic nominee Barack Obama with a 16.4% margin of victory. Prior to the election, all 17 news organizations considered this a state Obama would win, or otherwise considered as a safe blue state. Situated on the West Coast, which has become a reliably Democratic stronghold, Oregon is a relatively blue state. The last Republican presidential nominee to carry Oregon was Ronald Reagan in his 1984 landslide reelection. Although George W. Bush came close in both 2000 and 2004 (with Al Gore winning by 0.54 percentage points in 2000 and John Kerry by 4.16 percentage points in 2004), Republicans have not seriously contested the state since. This is also the first time that a presidential candidate won more than a million votes in Oregon.

As of the 2024 presidential election, this is the most recent election in which Jackson County and Wasco County voted for a Democratic presidential candidate, and the last time any Southern Oregon county sided with a Democrat. Marion County, which sided with Obama, would not vote Democratic again until 2020.

== Primaries ==
- 2008 Oregon Democratic presidential primary
- 2008 Oregon Republican presidential primary

== Campaign ==
=== Predictions ===
There were 16 news organizations who made state-by-state predictions of the election. Here are their last predictions before election day:

Source	Ranking
D.C. Political Report	Likely D
Cook Political Report	Solid D
The Takeaway	Solid D
Electoral-vote.com	Solid D
Washington Post	Solid D
Politico	Solid D
RealClearPolitics	Solid D
FiveThirtyEight	Solid D
CQ Politics	Solid D
The New York Times	Solid D
CNN	Safe D
NPR	Solid D
MSNBC	Solid D
Fox News	Likely D
Associated Press	Likely D
Rasmussen Reports	Safe D

=== Polling ===
Obama won every single pre-election poll. Since September 22, Obama won each by a double-digit margin of victory and at least 52% of the vote. The final 3 polls showed Obama leading 55% to 41%.

=== Fundraising ===
McCain raised a total of $1,258,426 in the state. Obama raised $6,660,622.

=== Advertising and visits ===
Obama and his interest groups spent $1,194,908. McCain and his interest groups spent just $159,222. Neither campaign visited the state.

== Analysis ==
Voters in Oregon have a strong penchant for advancing the protection of civil liberties and individual freedoms, liberal values that have given Democrats a big edge in the state in recent years. The state once leaned Republican, like most of the Pacific Northwest. It only went Democratic once from 1948 to 1984—during Lyndon Johnson's 44-state landslide of 1964. However, the state has gone Democratic in every election since 1988, and along with California and Washington it is reckoned as forming a solid bloc of blue states along the Pacific Coast.

On Election Day, Obama carried the state by 16.35 points. As Oregon was expected to be easily won by Obama, it was called for him as soon as the polls in the state closed. Besides Jackson County in the southwest and Wasco County in the central third, most rural counties in Oregon favored McCain in the 2008 election. Nevertheless, Obama performed much better in these regions than John Kerry had in 2004. Ultimately, Obama's strong support in the more urban Willamette Valley, home to two-thirds of the state's population, would have allowed him to win the state decisively in any event, coupled with the counties making up the northern half of the Oregon Coast. The state remains geographically and politically divided by the Cascade Mountains, with eastern Oregon and the southwest being more rural, less populated and therefore strongly Republican, while the Willamette Valley is more urbanized and therefore strongly Democratic. These two areas compose the core of each party's votes: rural Oregon is strongly Republican and culturally similar to Idaho, while the Willamette Valley—especially the cities of Portland and Eugene—heavily favors the Democrats.

While Republicans typically win more counties due to running up large margins in the east and southwest, Democrats typically win the state because the Willamette Valley has more people. In 2008, Obama's overwhelming margins in Portland and Eugene, combined with strong support from Portland's suburbs (which function as swing counties), enabled him to win a landslide in a structurally liberal state. Although Obama broke no decades-long Republican county streaks, he came within 0.49 percent of winning Polk County and 1.36 percent of winning Yamhill County, neither of which have voted for a Democratic presidential candidate since 1964. While not having carried Deschutes County, Obama was only 0.31 percent away from winning it. Prior to Joe Biden in 2020, this was the closest a Democratic candidate came to winning Deschutes County after the 1992 presidential election.

During the same election, Democratic Speaker of the Oregon House of Representatives Jeff Merkley defeated incumbent Republican U.S. Senator Gordon Smith by a narrow 3.35% margin. Merkley received 48.90 percent of the vote while Smith took in 45.55 percent, with the remaining 5.24 percent going to Dave Brownlow of the Constitution Party. At the state level, Democrats picked up five seats in the Oregon House of Representatives while Republicans picked up one seat in the Oregon Senate.

== Results ==
2008 United States presidential election in Oregon
Party	Candidate	Running mate	Votes	Percentage	Electoral votes
Democratic	Barack Obama	Joe Biden	1,037,291	56.75%	7
Republican	John McCain	Sarah Palin	738,475	40.40%	0
Peace	Ralph Nader	Matt Gonzalez	18,614	1.02%	0
Write-ins	Write-ins		13,613	0.74%	0
Constitution	Chuck Baldwin	Darrell Castle	7,693	0.42%	0
Libertarian	Bob Barr	Wayne Allyn Root	7,635	0.42%	0
Pacific Green	Cynthia McKinney	Rosa Clemente	4,543	0.25%	0
Totals			1,827,864	100.00%	7
Voter turnout (Voting age population)					62.9%

=== By county ===
County	Barack Obama Democratic		John McCain Republican		Various candidates Other parties		Margin		Total votes cast
County	#	%	#	%	#	%	#	%	Total votes cast
Baker	2,805	31.96%	5,650	64.37%	322	3.67%	-2,845	-32.41%	8,777
Benton	29,901	64.33%	15,264	32.84%	1,313	2.83%	14,637	31.49%	46,478
Clackamas	103,476	53.93%	83,595	43.57%	4,807	2.50%	19,881	10.36%	191,878
Clatsop	10,701	57.69%	7,192	38.78%	655	3.53%	3,509	18.91%	18,548
Columbia	13,390	54.06%	10,413	42.04%	965	3.90%	2,977	12.02%	24,768
Coos	14,401	46.53%	15,354	49.61%	1,196	3.86%	-953	-3.08%	30,951
Crook	3,632	35.09%	6,371	61.54%	349	3.37%	-2,739	-26.45%	10,352
Curry	5,230	42.41%	6,646	53.89%	456	3.70%	-1,416	-11.48%	12,332
Deschutes	38,819	48.66%	39,064	48.96%	1,899	2.38%	-245	-0.30%	79,782
Douglas	20,298	38.34%	30,919	58.41%	1,720	3.25%	-10,621	-20.07%	52,937
Gilliam	430	38.74%	648	58.38%	32	2.88%	-218	-19.64%	1,110
Grant	1,006	25.74%	2,785	71.25%	118	3.01%	-1,779	-45.51%	3,909
Harney	950	25.79%	2,595	70.46%	138	3.75%	-1,645	-44.67%	3,683
Hood River	6,302	64.11%	3,265	33.21%	263	2.68%	3,037	30.90%	9,830
Jackson	49,090	48.58%	49,043	48.53%	2,914	2.89%	47	0.05%	101,047
Jefferson	3,682	44.27%	4,402	52.92%	234	2.81%	-720	-8.65%	8,318
Josephine	17,412	41.41%	22,973	54.63%	1,664	3.96%	-5,561	-13.22%	42,049
Klamath	9,370	31.87%	19,113	65.01%	916	3.12%	-9,743	-33.14%	29,399
Lake	957	25.95%	2,638	71.53%	93	2.52%	-1,681	-45.58%	3,688
Lane	114,037	62.35%	63,835	34.90%	5,038	2.75%	50,202	27.45%	182,910
Lincoln	14,258	59.68%	8,791	36.80%	840	3.52%	5,467	22.88%	23,889
Linn	22,163	42.64%	28,071	54.00%	1,748	3.36%	-5,908	-11.36%	51,982
Malheur	2,949	28.27%	7,157	68.60%	327	3.13%	-4,208	-40.33%	10,433
Marion	61,816	49.63%	59,059	47.41%	3,688	2.96%	2,757	2.22%	124,563
Morrow	1,410	34.75%	2,509	61.83%	139	3.42%	-1,099	-27.08%	4,058
Multnomah	279,696	76.69%	75,171	20.61%	9,843	2.70%	204,525	56.08%	364,710
Polk	17,536	48.43%	17,714	48.92%	957	2.65%	-178	-0.49%	36,207
Sherman	385	36.77%	634	60.55%	28	2.68%	-249	-23.78%	1,047
Tillamook	7,072	53.18%	5,757	43.30%	468	3.52%	1,315	9.88%	13,297
Umatilla	9,484	37.16%	15,254	59.77%	785	3.07%	-5,770	-22.61%	25,523
Union	4,613	36.63%	7,581	60.20%	400	3.17%	-2,968	-23.57%	12,594
Wallowa	1,492	33.42%	2,836	63.52%	137	3.06%	-1,344	-30.10%	4,465
Wasco	5,906	51.90%	5,103	44.84%	371	3.26%	803	7.06%	11,380
Washington	141,544	59.82%	89,185	37.69%	5,903	2.49%	52,359	22.13%	236,632
Wheeler	281	34.61%	498	61.33%	33	4.06%	-217	-26.72%	812
Yamhill	20,797	47.78%	21,390	49.14%	1,339	3.08%	-593	-1.36%	43,526
Totals	1,037,291	56.75%	738,475	40.40%	52,098	2.85%	298,816	16.35%	1,827,864

Counties that flipped from Republican to Democratic

- Clackamas (largest city: Lake Oswego)
- Jackson (largest city: Medford)
- Marion (largest city: Salem)
- Tillamook (largest city: Tillamook)
- Wasco (largest city: The Dalles)

=== By congressional district ===
Barack Obama carried four of the state's five congressional districts in Oregon, all held by Democrats.

District	Obama	McCain	Representative
1st	61.03%	36.27%	David Wu
2nd	43.21%	53.86%	Greg Walden
3rd	71.39%	25.78%	Earl Blumenauer
4th	53.79%	43.08%	Peter DeFazio
5th	53.95%	43.33%	Darlene Hooley (110th Congress)
5th	53.95%	43.33%	Kurt Schrader (111th Congress)

== Electors ==
Technically the voters of Oregon cast their ballots for electors: representatives to the Electoral College. Oregon is allocated 7 electors because it has 5 congressional districts and 2 senators. All candidates who appear on the ballot or qualify to receive write-in votes must submit a list of 7 electors, who pledge to vote for their candidate and his or her running mate. Whoever wins the majority of votes in the state is awarded all 7 electoral votes. Their chosen electors then vote for president and vice president. Although electors are pledged to their candidate and running mate, they are not obligated to vote for them. An elector who votes for someone other than his or her candidate is known as a faithless elector.

The electors of each state and the District of Columbia met on December 15, 2008, to cast their votes for president and vice president. The Electoral College itself never meets as one body. Instead the electors from each state and the District of Columbia met in their respective capitols.

The following were the members of the Electoral College from the state. All 7 were pledged to Barack Obama and Joe Biden:

1. Michael Bohan
2. Shirley Cairns
3. Joe Smith
4. John McColgan
5. Meredith Wood Smith
6. Frank James Dixon
7. Bernard Gorter

== See also ==
- United States presidential elections in Oregon
- Presidency of Barack Obama
