= 1960 United States presidential election in Oregon =

- November 8, 1960

Nominee	Richard Nixon	John F. Kennedy
Party	Republican	Democratic
Home state	California	Massachusetts
Running mate	Henry Cabot Lodge Jr.	Lyndon B. Johnson
Electoral vote	6	0
Popular vote	408,060	367,402
Percentage	52.56%	47.32%
County results
Nixon
50–60%
60–70%
Kennedy
50–60%
President before election
Dwight D. Eisenhower
Republican
Elected President
John F. Kennedy
Democratic

The 1960 United States presidential election in Oregon took place on November 8, 1960, as part of the 1960 United States presidential election. Voters chose six representatives, or electors, to the Electoral College, who voted for president and vice president.

Oregon was won by incumbent Vice President Richard Nixon (R–California), running with former United States Ambassador to the United Nations Henry Cabot Lodge Jr., with 52.56% of the popular vote, against Senator John F. Kennedy (D–Massachusetts), running with Senator Lyndon B. Johnson, with 47.32% of the popular vote. As of the 2024 presidential election, this is the last election in which Multnomah County voted for a Republican presidential candidate.

== Background ==
Oregon had not voted for the Democratic presidential nominee since the 1944 election.

Legislation was passed in 1959 that created a primary system for the president. Candidates had no choice as to whether or not they would run in the Oregon primaries. Oregon had a unique law in which all individuals believed to be candidates (by the Attorney General) would be listed, whether or not they wanted to compete in the state's primary.

== Primaries ==
=== Democratic primary ===
Since at least 1957, Kennedy had been anticipating running in Oregon's primary due to the state's unique election laws, which would give him no choice as to whether or not he would be listed on the ballot.

Oregon's primary came late, just prior to California's. Kennedy had made several appearances in Oregon in the spring of 1959, and was leading according to his campaign's internal polling against a plethora of prospective opponents. He garnered the support of figures such as Edith Green. By late 1959, however, Senator Wayne Morse launched a favorite son campaign, which posed a viable challenge to Kennedy's prospects of winning Oregon.

Hubert Humphrey had been seen as having a realistic chance of winning the strongly liberal state electorate if he were to remain a viable candidate through late-May (when the primary was scheduled). However, Humphrey ultimately withdrew earlier on after losing the West Virginia primary.

Kennedy's campaign worried about a potential active campaign effort by Adlai Stevenson II in the state, where many voters were still enamored with the two-time Democratic standard bearer. In a January 26, 1960 memo, campaign manager Robert Kennedy stated that it was important for the Kennedy campaign to try and stop Stevenson from becoming an active factor in the Oregon primary. Congressman Charles O. Porter was seen as being likely to lead any potential effort to support a Stevenson candidacy in Oregon, therefore, Robert considered persuading him that such an effort would hand the primary to Morse, whom Porter despised. However, by May this proved to be unneeded, as Kennedy had already cleared the field.

While names of several other contenders appeared on the Oregon Democratic primary ballot, the only active opponent which Kennedy faced in the primary was Morse. Oregon was the only state in which Kennedy directly challenged a favorite son candidate. The Kennedy campaign saw the fiercely independent and progressive state electorate as challenging for them to maneuver. He defeated Morse 51 to 32%.

1960 Oregon Democratic Presidential Primary Results
Party	Candidate	Votes	Percentage
Democratic	John F. Kennedy	146,332	51.0%
Democratic	Wayne Morse	91,715	31.9%
Democratic	Hubert Humphrey	16,319	5.7%
Democratic	Stuart Symington	12,496	4.4%
Democratic	Lyndon B. Johnson	11,101	3.9%
Democratic	Adlai Stevenson II (write-ins)	7,924	2.8%
Democratic	Others	1,210	0.4%
Totals		287,097	100.00%

=== Republican primary ===
Richard Nixon was the only candidate placed onto the Republican primary ballot by the secretary of state. Nelson Rockefeller, who withdrew from the race, received a large number of write-in votes.

1960 Oregon Republican Presidential Primary Results
Party	Candidate	Votes	Percentage
Republican	Richard Nixon	211,276	93.1%
Republican	Nelson Rockefeller (write-ins)	9,307	4.1%
Democratic	John F. Kennedy (write-ins)	2,864	1.3%
Republican	Barry Goldwater (write-ins)	1,571	0.7%
Republican	Others	2,015	0.9%
Totals		227,033	100.00%

== Campaign ==
Nixon placed first in all four congressional districts. Crook County, a bellwether county since the 1884 election, incorrectly supported Kennedy. Oregon had one of the lowest Catholic and highest fundamentalist Protestant populations in the United States.

== Results ==
1960 United States presidential election in Oregon
Party	Candidate	Votes	%
Republican	Richard Nixon	408,060	52.56%
Democratic	John F. Kennedy	367,402	47.32%
Write-in		959	0.12%
Total votes		776,421	100%

=== Results by county ===
County	Richard Nixon Republican		John F. Kennedy Democratic		Various candidates Write-ins		Margin		Total votes cast
County	#	%	#	%	#	%	#	%	Total votes cast
Baker	3,514	48.46%	3,734	51.50%	3	0.04%	-220	-3.04%	7,251
Benton	9,734	64.36%	5,391	35.64%			4,343	28.72%	15,125
Clackamas	28,531	54.53%	23,679	45.26%	109	0.21%	4,852	9.27%	52,319
Clatsop	6,286	48.86%	6,530	50.75%	50	0.39%	-244	-1.89%	12,866
Columbia	4,356	43.96%	5,546	55.97%	6	0.06%	-1,190	-12.01%	9,908
Coos	8,751	40.32%	12,893	59.40%	61	0.28%	-4,142	-19.08%	21,705
Crook	1,732	46.35%	2,005	53.65%			-273	-7.30%	3,737
Curry	2,382	46.23%	2,767	53.70%	4	0.08%	-385	-7.47%	5,153
Deschutes	5,145	51.74%	4,776	48.03%	23	0.23%	369	3.71%	9,944
Douglas	12,493	48.39%	13,322	51.61%			-829	-3.22%	25,815
Gilliam	712	54.02%	606	45.98%			106	8.04%	1,318
Grant	1,697	54.13%	1,438	45.87%			259	8.26%	3,135
Harney	1,464	54.40%	1,220	45.34%	7	0.26%	244	9.06%	2,691
Hood River	3,103	55.86%	2,450	44.10%	2	0.04%	653	11.76%	5,555
Jackson	17,554	54.59%	14,531	45.19%	72	0.22%	3,023	9.40%	32,157
Jefferson	1,413	53.75%	1,214	46.18%	2	0.08%	199	7.57%	2,629
Josephine	7,387	57.57%	5,419	42.23%	25	0.19%	1,968	15.34%	12,831
Klamath	9,095	50.46%	8,928	49.54%			167	0.92%	18,023
Lake	1,555	51.90%	1,441	48.10%			114	3.80%	2,996
Lane	36,148	52.49%	32,596	47.34%	118	0.17%	3,552	5.15%	68,862
Lincoln	5,231	49.90%	5,243	50.01%	9	0.09%	-12	-0.11%	10,483
Linn	12,899	53.89%	11,035	46.11%			1,864	7.78%	23,934
Malheur	5,043	59.86%	3,381	40.14%			1,662	19.72%	8,424
Marion	29,124	58.28%	20,791	41.61%	55	0.11%	8,333	16.67%	49,970
Morrow	1,003	49.12%	1,039	50.88%			-36	-1.76%	2,042
Multnomah	127,271	50.53%	124,273	49.34%	338	0.13%	2,998	1.19%	251,882
Polk	6,709	59.38%	4,578	40.52%	11	0.10%	2,131	18.86%	11,298
Sherman	659	56.57%	506	43.43%			153	13.14%	1,165
Tillamook	3,935	48.92%	4,098	50.94%	11	0.14%	-163	-2.02%	8,044
Umatilla	9,374	53.77%	8,053	46.19%	6	0.03%	1,321	7.58%	17,433
Union	3,689	47.48%	4,081	52.52%			-392	-5.04%	7,770
Wallowa	1,440	46.08%	1,682	53.82%	3	0.10%	-242	-7.74%	3,125
Wasco	4,355	49.58%	4,426	50.39%	3	0.03%	-71	-0.81%	8,784
Washington	25,415	58.85%	17,736	41.07%	35	0.08%	7,679	17.78%	43,186
Wheeler	566	54.84%	466	45.16%			100	9.68%	1,032
Yamhill	8,295	59.98%	5,528	39.97%	6	0.04%	2,767	20.01%	13,829
Totals	408,060	52.56%	367,402	47.32%	959	0.12%	40,658	5.24%	776,421

==== Counties that flipped from Republican to Democratic ====
- Baker
- Clatsop
- Crook
- Curry
- Douglas
- Lincoln
- Morrow
- Tillamook
- Wasco

== See also ==
- United States presidential elections in Oregon

== Works cited ==
- Swarthout, John (1961). "The 1960 Election in Oregon". The Western Political Quarterly. 14 (1). University of Utah: 355–64. doi:10.2307/443859. JSTOR 443859.
