= United States presidential elections in Oregon =

Presidential elections in Oregon
- Number of elections: 42
- Voted Democratic: 17
- Voted Republican: 25
- Voted other: 0
- Voted for winning candidate: 30
- Voted for losing candidate: 12

Following is a table of United States presidential elections in Oregon, ordered by year. Since its admission to statehood in 1859, Oregon has participated in every U.S. presidential election.

Winners of the state are in bold. The shading refers to the state winner, and not the national winner.

== Elections from 1864 to present ==
View source data.

Year	Winner (nationally)	Votes	Percent	Runner-up (nationally)	Votes	Percent	Other national candidates (Note: For purposes of these lists, other national candidates are defined as those who won at least one electoral vote, or won at least ten percent of the vote in multiple states.)	Votes	Percent	Electoral votes	Notes
2024	Donald Trump	919,480	40.97	**Kamala Harris**	1,240,600	55.27	—			8	
2020	**Joe Biden**	1,340,383	56.45	Donald Trump	958,448	40.37	—			7	
2016	Donald Trump (Note: Won the electoral college while losing the popular vote)	782,403	39.09	**Hillary Clinton**	1,002,106	50.07	—			7	
2012	**Barack Obama**	970,488	54.24	Mitt Romney	754,175	42.15	—			7	
2008	**Barack Obama**	1,037,291	56.75	John McCain	738,475	40.40	—			7	
2004	George W. Bush	866,831	47.19	**John Kerry**	943,163	51.35	—			7	
2000	George W. Bush	713,577	46.52	**Al Gore**	720,342	46.96	—			7	
1996	**Bill Clinton**	649,641	47.15	Bob Dole	538,152	39.06	Ross Perot	121,221	8.80	7	
1992	**Bill Clinton**	621,314	42.48	George H. W. Bush	475,757	32.53	Ross Perot	354,091	24.21	7	
1988	George H. W. Bush	560,126	46.61	**Michael Dukakis**	616,206	51.28	—			7	
1984	**Ronald Reagan**	685,700	55.91	Walter Mondale	536,479	43.74	—			7	
1980	**Ronald Reagan**	571,044	48.33	Jimmy Carter	456,890	38.67	John B. Anderson	112,389	9.51	6	
1976	Jimmy Carter	490,407	47.62	**Gerald Ford**	492,120	47.78	—			6	
1972	**Richard Nixon**	486,686	52.45	George McGovern	392,760	42.33	—			6	
1968	**Richard Nixon**	408,433	49.83	Hubert Humphrey	358,866	43.78	George Wallace	49,683	6.06	6	
1964	**Lyndon B. Johnson**	501,017	63.72	Barry Goldwater	282,779	35.96	—			6	
1960	John F. Kennedy	367,402	47.32	**Richard Nixon**	408,060	52.56	—			6	
1956	**Dwight D. Eisenhower**	406,393	55.25	Adlai Stevenson II	329,204	44.75	T. Coleman Andrews/ Unpledged Electors (Note: Was allied with a slate of unpledged electors in Louisiana, Mississippi and South Carolina)	—	—	6	
1952	**Dwight D. Eisenhower**	420,815	60.54	Adlai Stevenson II	270,579	38.93	—			6	
1948	Harry S. Truman	243,147	46.40	**Thomas E. Dewey**	260,904	49.78	Strom Thurmond	—	—	6	
1944	**Franklin D. Roosevelt**	248,635	51.78	Thomas E. Dewey	225,365	46.94	—			6	
1940	**Franklin D. Roosevelt**	258,415	53.70	Wendell Willkie	219,555	45.62	—			5	
1936	**Franklin D. Roosevelt**	266,733	64.42	Alf Landon	122,706	29.64	—			5	
1932	**Franklin D. Roosevelt**	213,871	57.99	Herbert Hoover	136,019	36.88	—			5	
1928	**Herbert Hoover**	205,341	64.18	Al Smith	109,223	34.14	—			5	
1924	**Calvin Coolidge**	142,579	51.01	John W. Davis	67,589	24.18	Robert M. La Follette	68,403	24.47	5	
1920	**Warren G. Harding**	143,592	60.20	James M. Cox	80,019	33.55	Parley P. Christensen	—	—	5	
1916	Woodrow Wilson	120,087	45.9	**Charles E. Hughes**	126,813	48.47	—			5	
1912	**Woodrow Wilson**	47,064	34.34	Theodore Roosevelt	37,600	27.44	William H. Taft	34,673	25.3	5	
1908	**William H. Taft**	62,530	56.39	William Jennings Bryan	38,049	34.31	—			4	
1904	**Theodore Roosevelt**	60,455	67.06	Alton B. Parker	17,521	19.43	—			4	
1900	**William McKinley**	46,172	55.46	William Jennings Bryan	32,810	39.41	—			4	
1896	**William McKinley**	48,779	50.07	William Jennings Bryan	46,739	47.98	—			4	
1892	Grover Cleveland	14,243	18.15	**Benjamin Harrison**	35,002	44.59	James B. Weaver	26,965	34.35	4	Electoral votes split, three for Harrison, one for Weaver.
1888	**Benjamin Harrison**	33,291	53.82	Grover Cleveland	26,522	42.88	—			3	
1884	Grover Cleveland	24,604	46.70	**James G. Blaine**	26,860	50.99	—			3	
1880	**James A. Garfield**	20,619	50.51	Winfield S. Hancock	19,955	48.88	James B. Weaver	249	0.61	3	
1876	**Rutherford B. Hayes**	15,214	50.92	Samuel J. Tilden	14,157	47.38	—			3	
1872	**Ulysses S. Grant**	11,818	58.66	Horace Greeley	7,742	38.43	—			3	
1868	Ulysses S. Grant	10,961	49.6	**Horatio Seymour**	11,125	50.4	—			3	
1864	**Abraham Lincoln**	9,888	53.9	George B. McClellan	8,457	46.1	—			3	

== Election of 1860 ==
The election of 1860 was a complex realigning election in which the breakdown of the previous two-party alignment culminated in four parties each competing for influence in different parts of the country. The result of the election, with the victory of an ardent opponent of slavery, spurred the secession of eleven states and brought about the American Civil War.

Year	Winner (nationally)	Votes	Percent	Runner-up (nationally)	Votes	Percent	Runner-up (nationally)	Votes	Percent	Runner-up (nationally)	Votes	Percent	Electoral votes
1860	**Abraham Lincoln**	5,329	36.1	Stephen A. Douglas	4,136	28.0	John C. Breckinridge	5,075	34.4	John Bell	218	1.5	3

== See also ==
- Elections in Oregon
