= 1860 United States presidential election in Oregon =

- November 6, 1860
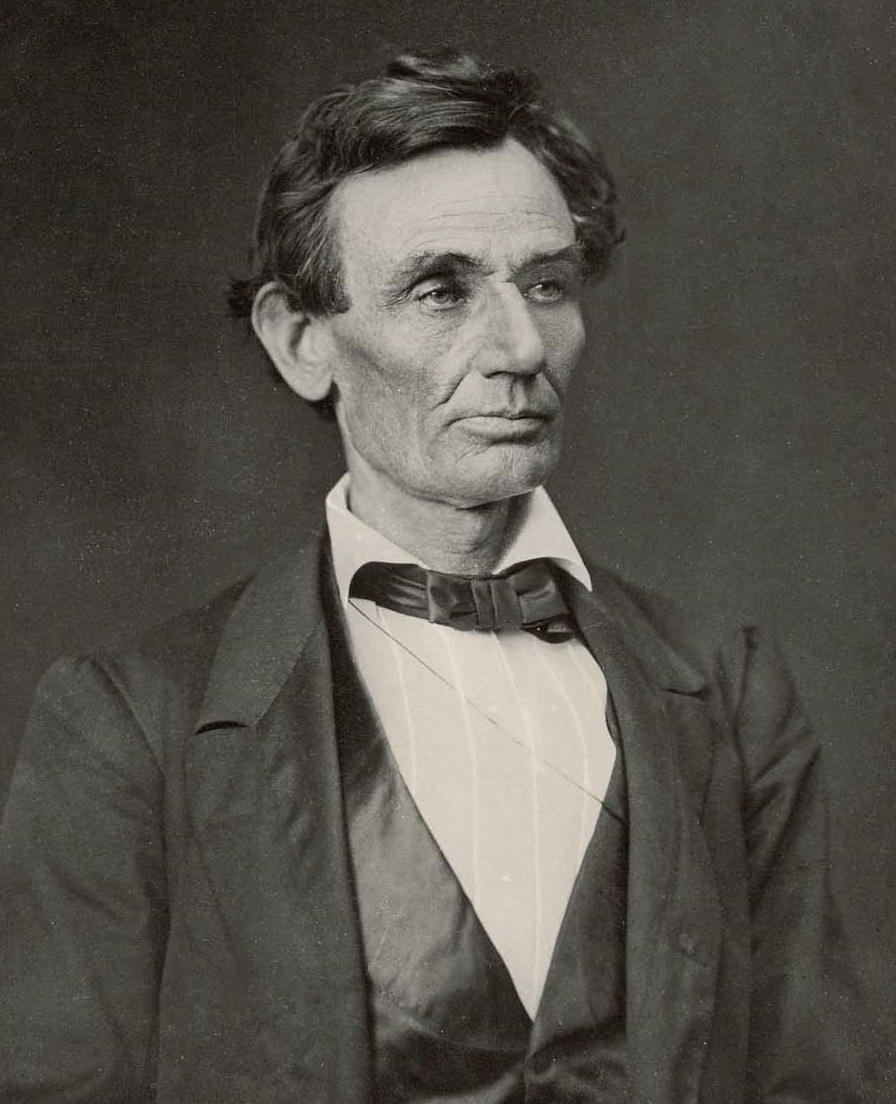

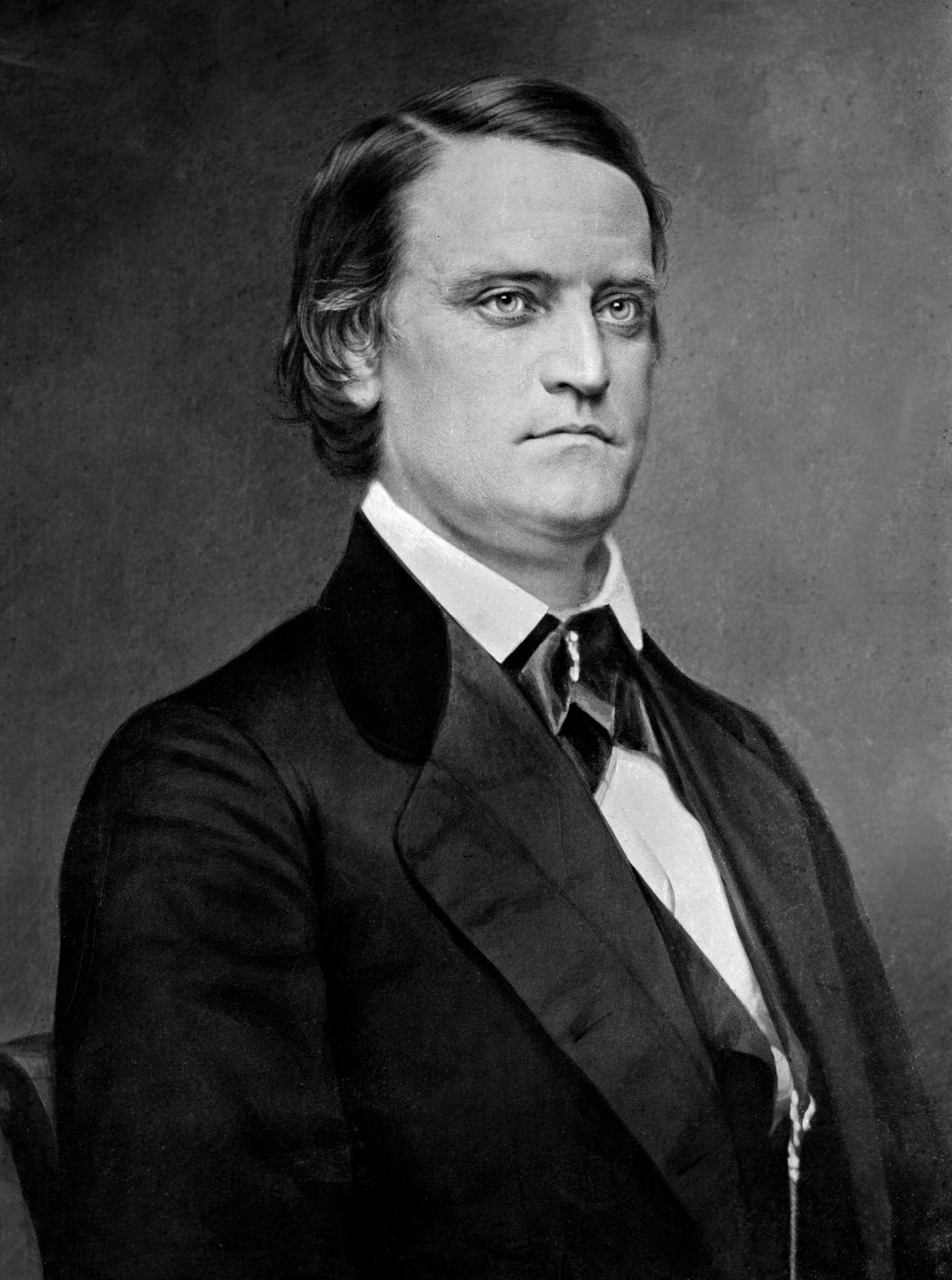

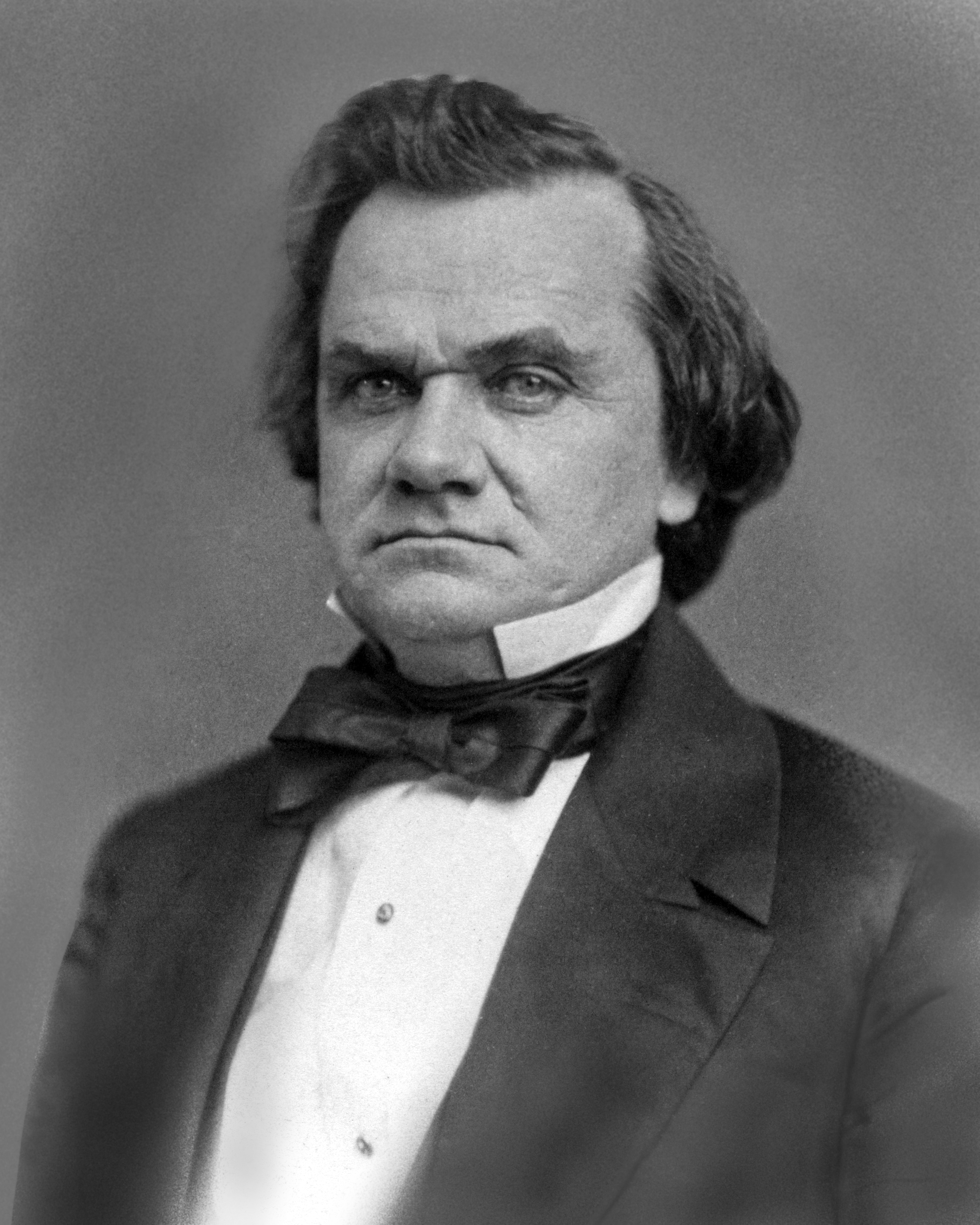
Nominee	Abraham Lincoln	John C. Breckinridge	Stephen A. Douglas
Party	Republican	Southern Democratic	Democratic
Home state	Illinois	Kentucky	Illinois
Running mate	Hannibal Hamlin	Joseph Lane	Herschel V. Johnson
Electoral vote	3	0	0
Popular vote	5,344	5,074	4,131
Percentage	36.20%	34.37%	27.99%
County results
Lincoln
40–50%
50–60%
Breckinridge
40–50%
50–60%
Douglas
40–50%
President before election
James Buchanan
Democratic
Elected President
Abraham Lincoln
Republican

The 1860 United States presidential election in Oregon took place on November 6, 1860, as part of the 1860 United States presidential election. Oregon voters chose three representatives, or electors, to the Electoral College, who voted for president and vice president.

Oregon voted in its first ever presidential election, having become the 33rd state on February 14, 1859. The state was won by the Republican nominee, Illinois Representative Abraham Lincoln and his running mate Senator Hannibal Hamlin of Maine. They defeated the Southern Democratic nominee 14th Vice President of the United States John C. Breckinridge of Kentucky and his running mate Senator Joseph Lane of Oregon as well as Democratic nominee Senator Stephen A. Douglas of Illinois and his running mate 41st Governor of Georgia Herschel V. Johnson. Lincoln won the state by a narrow margin of 1.83%.

Oregon was the only state where the first and second-place finishers matched the first and second place national finishers in the electoral college (Lincoln first, then Breckinridge in second). The large amount of counties voting for Breckinridge can be attributed to Southern sympathies.

== Results ==
1860 United States presidential election in Oregon
Party	Candidate	Votes	%
Republican	Abraham Lincoln	5,344	36.20%
Southern Democratic	John C. Breckinridge	5,074	34.37%
Democratic	Stephen A. Douglas	4,131	27.99%
Constitutional Union	John Bell	212	1.44%
Total votes		14,761	100%

=== Results by county ===
1860 United States Presidential Election in Oregon (by county)
County	Abraham Lincoln Republican		John C. Breckinridge Southern Democratic		Stephen A. Douglas Democratic		John Bell Constitutional Union		Total votes cast
County	#	%	#	%	#	%	#	%	Total votes cast
Benton	213	28.86%	392	53.12%	130	17.62%	3	0.41%	738
Clackamas	410	44.86%	323	35.34%	179	19.58%	2	0.22%	914
Clatsop	68	50.37%	29	21.48%	38	28.15%	0	0.00%	135
Columbia	62	43.36%	36	25.17%	45	31.47%	0	0.00%	143
Coos	71	38.17%	22	11.83%	90	48.39%	3	1.61%	186
Curry	42	24.71%	53	31.18%	69	40.59%	6	3.53%	170
Douglas	322	28.37%	506	44.58%	284	25.02%	23	2.03%	1,135
Jackson	377	24.53%	672	43.72%	399	25.96%	89	5.79%	1,537
Josephine	253	30.37%	351	42.14%	211	25.33%	18	2.16%	833
Lane	507	41.09%	565	45.79%	155	12.56%	7	0.57%	1,234
Linn	582	37.14%	672	42.88%	308	19.66%	5	0.32%	1,567
Marion	598	33.86%	286	16.19%	865	48.98%	17	0.96%	1,766
Multnomah	571	47.54%	261	21.73%	364	30.31%	5	0.42%	1,201
Polk	191	23.58%	215	26.54%	400	49.38%	4	0.49%	810
Tillamook	11	34.38%	13	40.63%	8	25.00%	0	0.00%	32
Umpqua	151	50.67%	75	25.17%	72	24.16%	0	0.00%	298
Wasco	168	29.42%	255	44.66%	148	25.92%	0	0.00%	571
Washington	371	57.43%	138	21.36%	134	20.74%	3	0.46%	646
Yamhill	415	48.82%	217	25.53%	211	24.82%	7	0.82%	850
Total	5,344	36.20%	5,074	34.37%	4,131	27.99%	212	1.44%	14,761

== See also ==
- United States presidential elections in Oregon
