= 1880 United States presidential election in Oregon =

- November 2, 1880
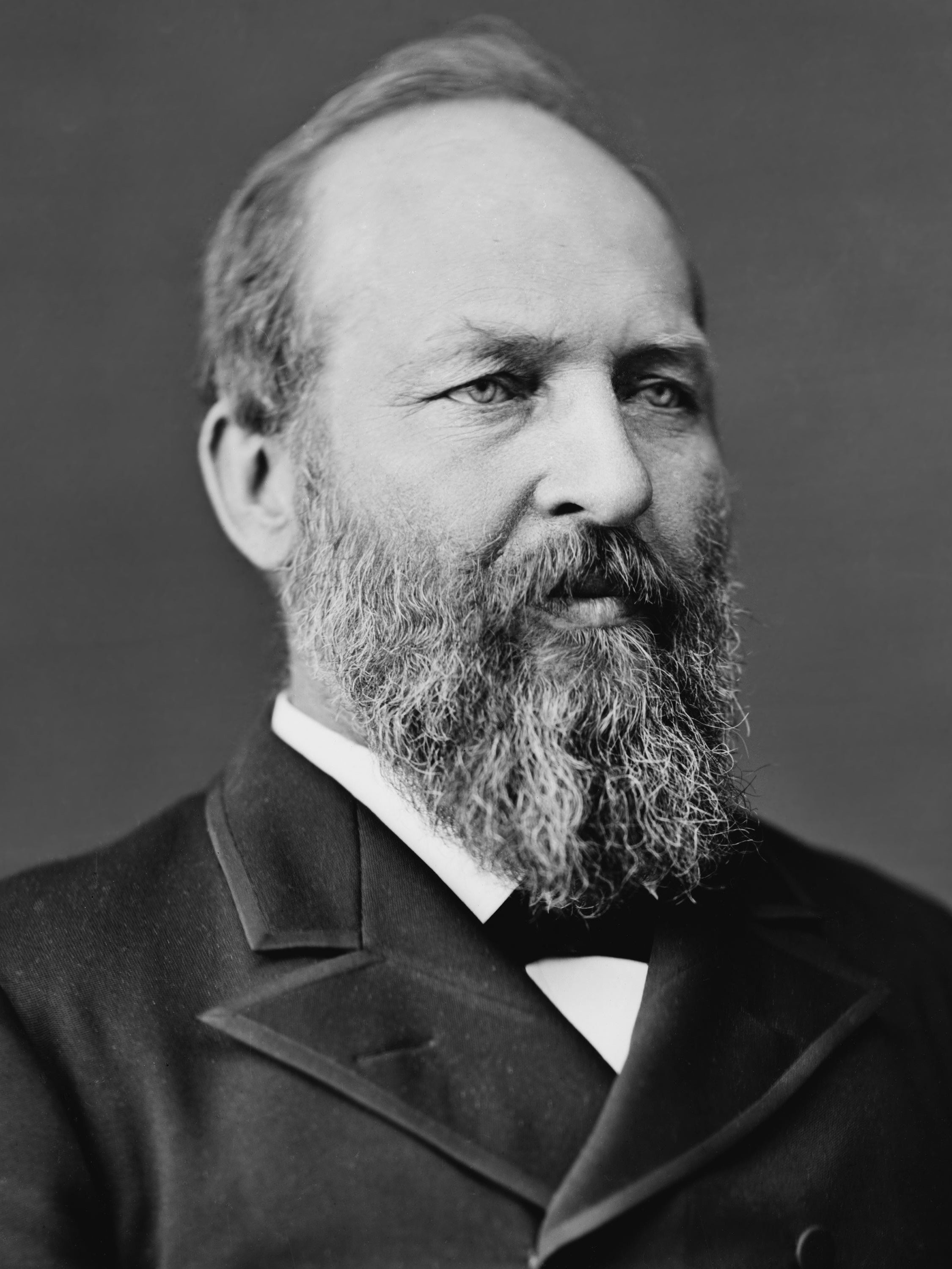

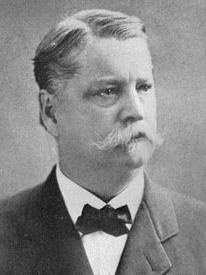
Nominee	James A. Garfield	Winfield Scott Hancock
Party	Republican	Democratic
Home state	Ohio	Pennsylvania
Running mate	Chester A. Arthur	William Hayden English
Electoral vote	3	0
Popular vote	20,619	19,955
Percentage	50.51%	48.88%
County results
Garfield
40–50%
50–60%
60–70%
Hancock
50–60%
60–70%
President before election
Rutherford B. Hayes
Republican
Elected President
James A. Garfield
Republican

The 1880 United States presidential election in Oregon took place on November 2, 1880, as part of the 1880 United States presidential election. Voters chose three representatives, or electors to the Electoral College, who voted for president and vice president.

Oregon voted for the Republican nominee, James A. Garfield, over the Democratic nominee, Winfield Scott Hancock. Garfield won the state by a narrow margin of 1.63%.

== Results ==
1880 United States presidential election in Oregon
Party	Candidate	Running mate	Popular vote		Electoral vote	
Party	Candidate	Running mate	Count	%	Count	%
Republican	James Abram Garfield of Ohio	Chester Alan Arthur of New York	20,619	50.51%	3	100.00%
Democratic	Winfield Scott Hancock of Pennsylvania	William Hayden English of Indiana	19,955	48.88%	0	0.00%
Greenback	James Baird Weaver of Iowa	Barzillai Jefferson Chambers of Texas	249	0.61%	0	0.00%
Total			40,863	100.00%	3	100.00%

=== Results by county ===
County	James Abram Garfield Republican		Winfield Scott Hancock Democratic		James Baird Weaver Greenback		Margin		Total votes cast
County	#	%	#	%	#	%	#	%	Total votes cast
Baker	446	41.49%	629	58.51%	0	0.00%	-183	-17.02%	1,075
Benton	745	49.73%	696	46.46%	57	3.81%	49	3.27%	1,498
Clackamas	1,166	57.10%	872	42.70%	4	0.20%	294	14.40%	2,042
Clatsop	536	55.26%	434	44.74%	0	0.00%	102	10.52%	970
Columbia	312	57.78%	228	42.22%	0	0.00%	84	15.56%	540
Coos	607	52.28%	554	47.72%	0	0.00%	53	4.57%	1,161
Curry	148	50.34%	146	49.66%	0	0.00%	2	0.68%	294
Douglas	1,256	52.80%	1,105	46.45%	18	0.76%	151	6.35%	2,379
Grant	461	51.39%	436	48.61%	0	0.00%	25	2.79%	897
Jackson	743	41.03%	1,065	58.81%	3	0.17%	-322	-17.78%	1,811
Josephine	199	39.80%	279	55.80%	22	4.40%	-80	-16.00%	500
Lake	224	37.33%	376	62.67%	0	0.00%	-152	-25.33%	600
Lane	1,012	47.05%	1,092	50.77%	47	2.19%	-80	-3.72%	2,151
Linn	1,416	45.43%	1,677	53.80%	24	0.77%	-261	-8.37%	3,117
Marion	2,051	59.21%	1,386	40.01%	27	0.78%	665	19.20%	3,464
Multnomah	3,211	54.14%	2,720	45.86%	0	0.00%	491	8.28%	5,931
Polk	771	51.71%	712	47.75%	8	0.54%	59	3.96%	1,491
Tillamook	134	61.47%	84	38.53%	0	0.00%	50	22.94%	218
Umatilla	1,250	44.88%	1,535	55.12%	0	0.00%	-285	-10.23%	2,785
Union	664	41.95%	899	56.79%	20	1.26%	-235	-14.85%	1,583
Wasco	1,330	46.83%	1,510	53.17%	0	0.00%	-180	-6.34%	2,840
Washington	880	58.86%	578	38.66%	37	2.47%	302	20.20%	1,495
Yamhill	1,057	52.88%	942	47.12%	0	0.00%	115	5.75%	1,999
Totals	20,619	50.49%	19,955	48.86%	267	0.65%	664	1.63%	40,841

== See also ==
- United States presidential elections in Oregon
