= 1864 United States presidential election in Oregon =

- November 8, 1864
- Turnout: 34.98% of the total population ▲6.85 pp

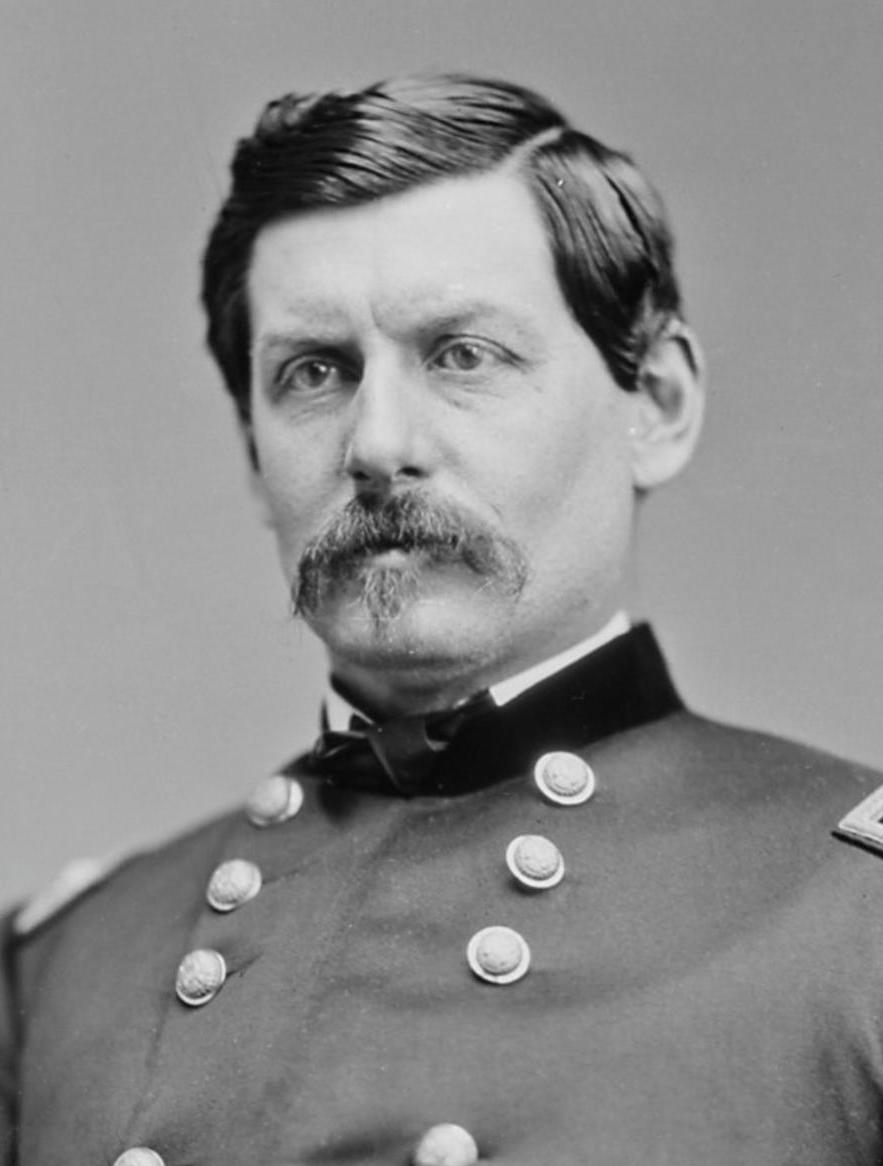
Nominee	Abraham Lincoln	George B. McClellan
Party	National Union	Democratic
Home state	Illinois	New Jersey
Running mate	Andrew Johnson	George H. Pendleton
Electoral vote	3	0
Popular vote	9,888	8,457
Percentage	53.90%	46.10%
County results
Lincoln
50–60%
60–70%
70–80%
McClellan
50–60%
President before election
Abraham Lincoln
Republican
Elected President
Abraham Lincoln
National Union

The 1864 United States presidential election in Oregon took place on November 8, 1864, as part of the 1864 United States presidential election. Voters chose three representatives, or electors, to the Electoral College, who voted for president and vice president.

Oregon was won by the National Union candidate, incumbent Republican President Abraham Lincoln of Illinois and his running mate former Senator and Military Governor of Tennessee Andrew Johnson. They defeated the Democratic candidate, 4th Commanding General of the United States Army George B. McClellan of New Jersey and his running mate Representative George H. Pendleton. Lincoln won the state by a margin of 7.8%.

== Results ==
1864 United States presidential election in Oregon
Party	Candidate	Running mate	Popular vote		Electoral vote	
Party	Candidate	Running mate	Count	%	Count	%
National Union	Abraham Lincoln of Illinois	Andrew Johnson of Tennessee	9,888	53.90%	3	100.00%
Democratic	George B. McClellan of New Jersey	George H. Pendleton of Ohio	8,457	46.10%	0	0.00%
Total			18,345	100.00%	3	100.00%

== See also ==
- United States presidential elections in Oregon
