= 1876 United States presidential election in Oregon =

- November 7, 1876
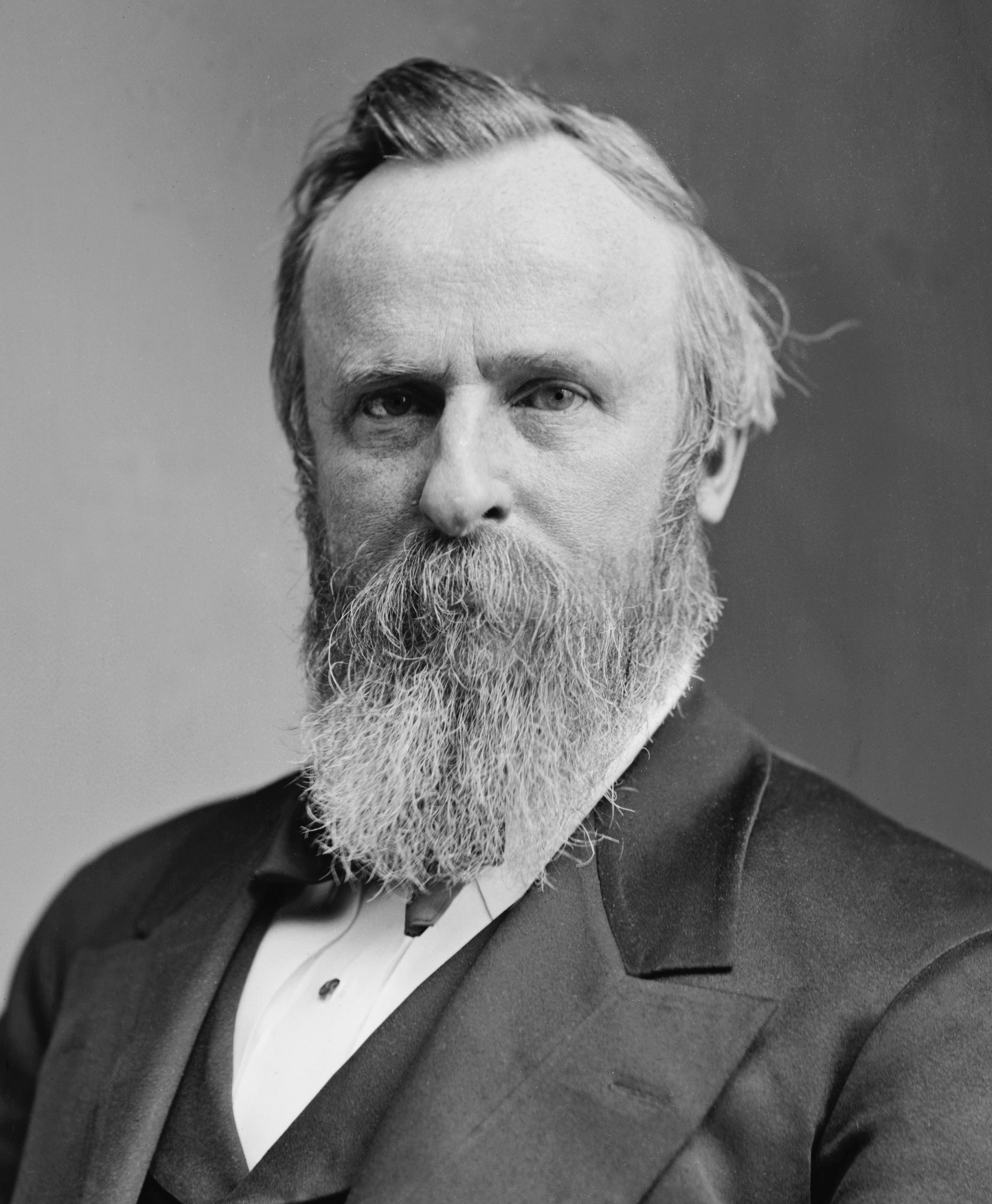

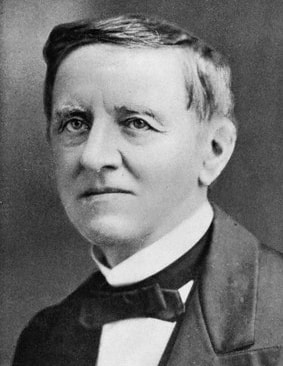
| Nominee | Rutherford B. Hayes | Samuel J. Tilden |
| Party | Republican | Democratic |
| Home state | Ohio | New York |
| Running mate | William A. Wheeler | Thomas A. Hendricks |
| Electoral vote | 3 | 0 |
| Popular vote | 15,214 | 14,157 |
| Percentage | 50.92% | 47.38% |
County results
Hayes
40–50%
50–60%
60–70%
Tilden
40–50%
50–60%
60–70%
President before election
Ulysses S. Grant
Republican
Elected President
Rutherford B. Hayes
Republican

The 1876 United States presidential election in Oregon took place on November 7, 1876, as part of the 1876 United States presidential election. Voters chose three representatives, or electors to the Electoral College, who voted for president and vice president.

Oregon voted for the Republican nominee, Rutherford B. Hayes, over the Democratic nominee, Samuel J. Tilden. Hayes won the state by a narrow margin of 3.54%.

After the election, Republican elector John W. Watts' candidacy was disputed by Democrats, arguing that under Article Two of the United States Constitution he was ineligible on the grounds that, as deputy postmaster of Lafayette, he held "an Office of Trust or Profit under the United States," even though he resigned from the position between the election on November 7 and the meeting of electors on December 6. If removed from contention, the fourth-placed elector, Democratic E. A. Cronin, would have become elector, giving Tilden the 185 votes he needed to secure the presidency.

On December 4, Secretary of State Stephen F. Chadwick declared that Watts and the other two Republican electors (John C. Cartwright and W. H. Odell) had been elected, but Governor La Fayette Grover issued a certificate to Cronin instead of Watts. On December 6, the three Republicans met and cast their votes for Hayes and his running mate William A. Wheeler, while Cronin appointed two others in Cartwright and Odell's steads – Cronin voted for Tilden and his running mate Thomas A. Hendricks while the others voted for Hayes and Wheeler. Both sets of returns were sent to Washington, D.C., with Cronin's bearing a certificate from the Governor and Watts' bearing the return of votes from the Secretary of State. Ultimately, the vote of the Watts slate was chosen by the Electoral Commission, confirming Hayes and Wheeler's victory in the election.

== Results ==
1876 United States presidential election in Oregon
| Party | Candidate | Running mate | Popular vote | | Electoral vote | |
| Party | Candidate | Running mate | Count | % | Count | % |
|---|---|---|---|---|---|---|
| Republican | Rutherford B. Hayes of Ohio | William A. Wheeler of New York | 15,214 | 50.92% | 3 | 100.00% |
| Democratic | Samuel J. Tilden of New York | Thomas A. Hendricks of Indiana | 14,157 | 47.38% | 0 | 0.00% |
| Greenback | Peter Cooper of New York | Samuel Fenton Cary of Ohio | 510 | 1.71% | 0 | 0.00% |
| Total | | | 29,881 | 100.00% | 3 | 100.00% |

== See also ==
- United States presidential elections in Oregon
