= 1948 United States presidential election in Oregon =

- November 2, 1948

All 6 Oregon votes to the Electoral College
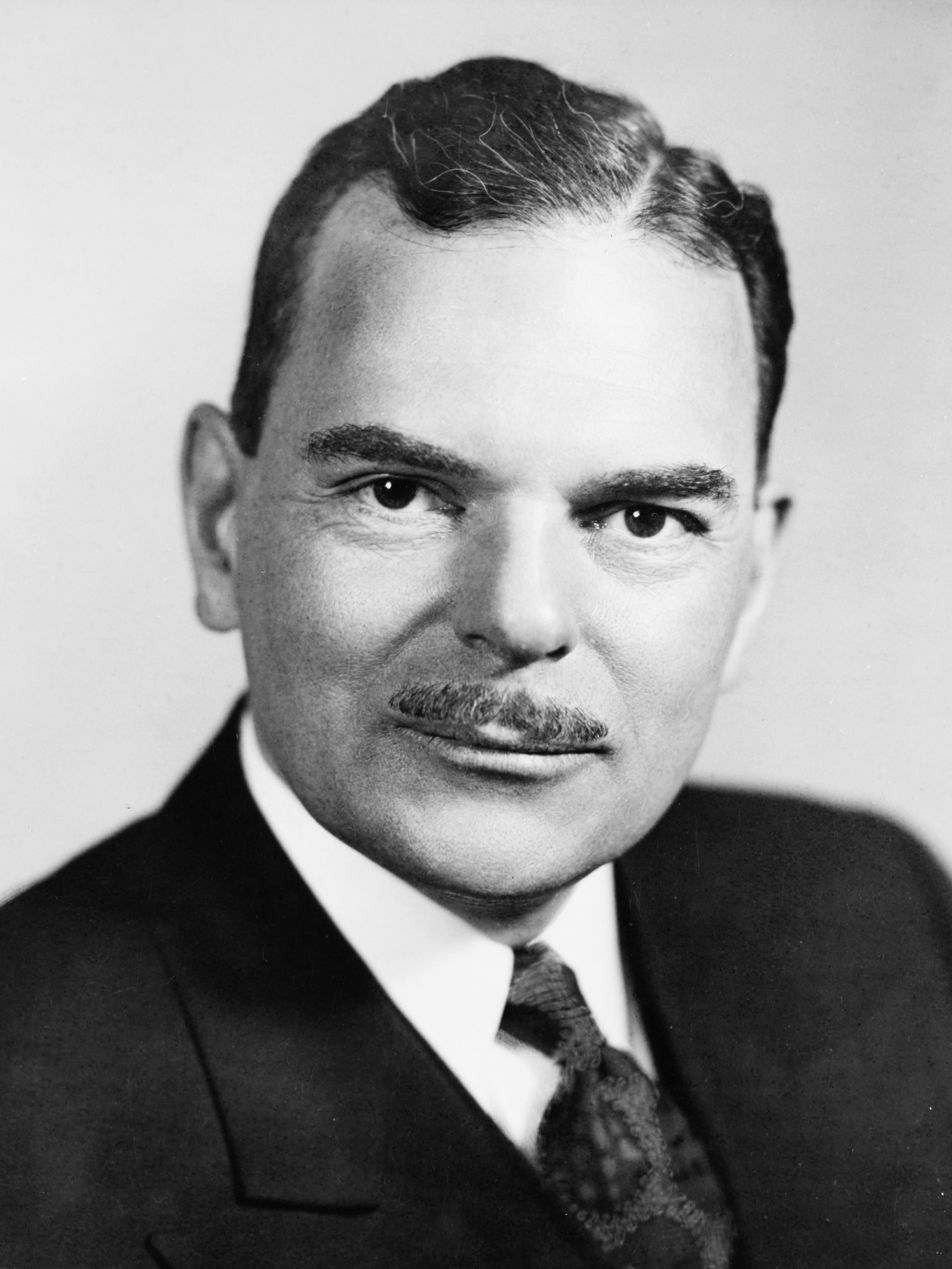

Nominee	Thomas E. Dewey	Harry S. Truman
Party	Republican	Democratic
Home state	New York	Missouri
Running mate	Earl Warren	Alben W. Barkley
Electoral vote	6	0
Popular vote	260,904	243,147
Percentage	49.78%	46.40%
County results
Dewey
40–50%
50–60%
60–70%
Truman
40–50%
50–60%
President before election
Harry S. Truman
Democratic
Elected President
Harry S. Truman
Democratic

The 1948 United States presidential election in Oregon took place on November 2, 1948, as part of the 1948 United States presidential election. Voters chose six representatives, or electors, to the Electoral College, who voted for president and vice president.

Oregon was won by Governor Thomas E. Dewey (R–New York), running with Governor Earl Warren, with 49.78% of the popular vote, against incumbent President Harry S. Truman (D–Missouri), running with Senator Alben W. Barkley, with 46.40% of the popular vote.

Dewey's victory was the first of four consecutive Republican victories in the state, as Oregon would not vote Democratic again until Lyndon B. Johnson’s 1964 landslide victory.

This was the last election until 1988 in which Oregon and California did not vote for the same candidate and, as of 2024, it has not happened again.

== Results ==
1948 United States presidential election in Oregon
Party	Candidate	Votes	%
Republican	Thomas E. Dewey	260,904	49.78%
Democratic	Harry S. Truman (inc.)	243,147	46.40%
Progressive	Henry A. Wallace	14,978	2.86%
Independent	Norman Thomas	5,051	0.96%
Total votes		524,080	100%

=== Results by county ===
County	Thomas E. Dewey Republican		Harry S. Truman Democratic		Henry A. Wallace Progressive		Norman Thomas Independent		Margin		Total votes cast
County	#	%	#	%	#	%	#	%	#	%	Total votes cast
Baker	2,841	47.04%	3,035	50.25%	126	2.09%	38	0.63%	-194	-3.21%	6,040
Benton	6,839	66.21%	3,135	30.35%	241	2.33%	114	1.10%	3,704	35.86%	10,329
Clackamas	14,431	47.97%	14,263	47.41%	1,022	3.40%	367	1.22%	168	0.56%	30,083
Clatsop	5,076	44.87%	5,574	49.27%	599	5.29%	64	0.57%	-498	-4.40%	11,313
Columbia	3,049	36.95%	4,768	57.79%	370	4.48%	64	0.78%	-1,719	-20.83%	8,251
Coos	5,536	47.88%	5,453	47.16%	482	4.17%	91	0.79%	83	0.72%	11,562
Crook	960	44.84%	1,149	53.67%	18	0.84%	14	0.65%	-189	-8.83%	2,141
Curry	1,112	59.18%	677	36.03%	71	3.78%	19	1.01%	435	23.15%	1,879
Deschutes	3,463	48.35%	3,499	48.85%	155	2.16%	46	0.64%	-36	-0.50%	7,163
Douglas	7,671	56.35%	5,500	40.41%	391	2.87%	50	0.37%	2,171	15.95%	13,612
Gilliam	623	52.62%	544	45.95%	14	1.18%	3	0.25%	79	6.67%	1,184
Grant	1,090	47.54%	1,156	50.41%	35	1.53%	12	0.52%	-66	-2.88%	2,293
Harney	784	48.28%	802	49.38%	34	2.09%	4	0.25%	-18	-1.11%	1,624
Hood River	2,134	52.80%	1,761	43.57%	114	2.82%	33	0.82%	373	9.23%	4,042
Jackson	11,226	58.86%	7,342	38.50%	391	2.05%	113	0.59%	3,884	20.36%	19,072
Jefferson	622	50.69%	559	45.56%	40	3.26%	6	0.49%	63	5.13%	1,227
Josephine	5,004	58.27%	3,290	38.31%	241	2.81%	53	0.62%	1,714	19.96%	8,588
Klamath	7,072	47.47%	7,520	50.48%	259	1.74%	47	0.32%	-448	-3.01%	14,898
Lake	1,083	48.05%	1,104	48.98%	58	2.57%	9	0.40%	-21	-0.93%	2,254
Lane	20,843	55.27%	15,606	41.39%	801	2.12%	459	1.22%	5,237	13.89%	37,709
Lincoln	3,587	46.85%	3,720	48.59%	279	3.64%	70	0.91%	-133	-1.74%	7,656
Linn	7,936	50.37%	7,260	46.08%	448	2.84%	111	0.70%	676	4.29%	15,755
Malheur	3,265	55.36%	2,499	42.37%	90	1.53%	44	0.75%	766	12.99%	5,898
Marion	18,997	57.27%	13,183	39.74%	685	2.07%	306	0.92%	5,814	17.53%	33,171
Morrow	751	46.30%	838	51.66%	21	1.29%	12	0.74%	-87	-5.36%	1,622
Multnomah	86,519	45.77%	93,703	49.57%	6,494	3.44%	2,312	1.22%	-7,184	-3.80%	189,028
Polk	4,328	54.02%	3,451	43.07%	158	1.97%	75	0.94%	877	10.95%	8,012
Sherman	532	53.20%	454	45.40%	10	1.00%	4	0.40%	78	7.80%	1,000
Tillamook	2,952	46.96%	3,128	49.76%	155	2.47%	51	0.81%	-176	-2.80%	6,286
Umatilla	5,726	48.69%	5,891	50.09%	103	0.88%	41	0.35%	-165	-1.40%	11,761
Union	2,668	39.83%	3,808	56.85%	175	2.61%	47	0.70%	-1,140	-17.02%	6,698
Wallowa	1,196	44.71%	1,408	52.64%	49	1.83%	22	0.82%	-212	-7.93%	2,675
Wasco	2,740	51.74%	2,438	46.03%	80	1.51%	38	0.72%	302	5.70%	5,296
Washington	11,455	53.06%	9,424	43.65%	491	2.27%	219	1.01%	2,031	9.41%	21,589
Wheeler	414	49.23%	411	48.87%	10	1.19%	6	0.71%	3	0.36%	841
Yamhill	6,379	55.33%	4,794	41.59%	268	2.32%	87	0.75%	1,585	13.75%	11,528
Totals	260,904	49.78%	243,147	46.40%	14,978	2.86%	5,051	0.96%	17,757	3.39%	524,080

==== Counties that flipped from Democratic to Republican ====
- Clackamas
- Coos
- Gilliam
- Sherman

==== Counties that flipped from Republican to Democratic ====
- Umatilla

== See also ==
- United States presidential elections in Oregon
