= 1872 United States presidential election in Oregon =

- November 5, 1872
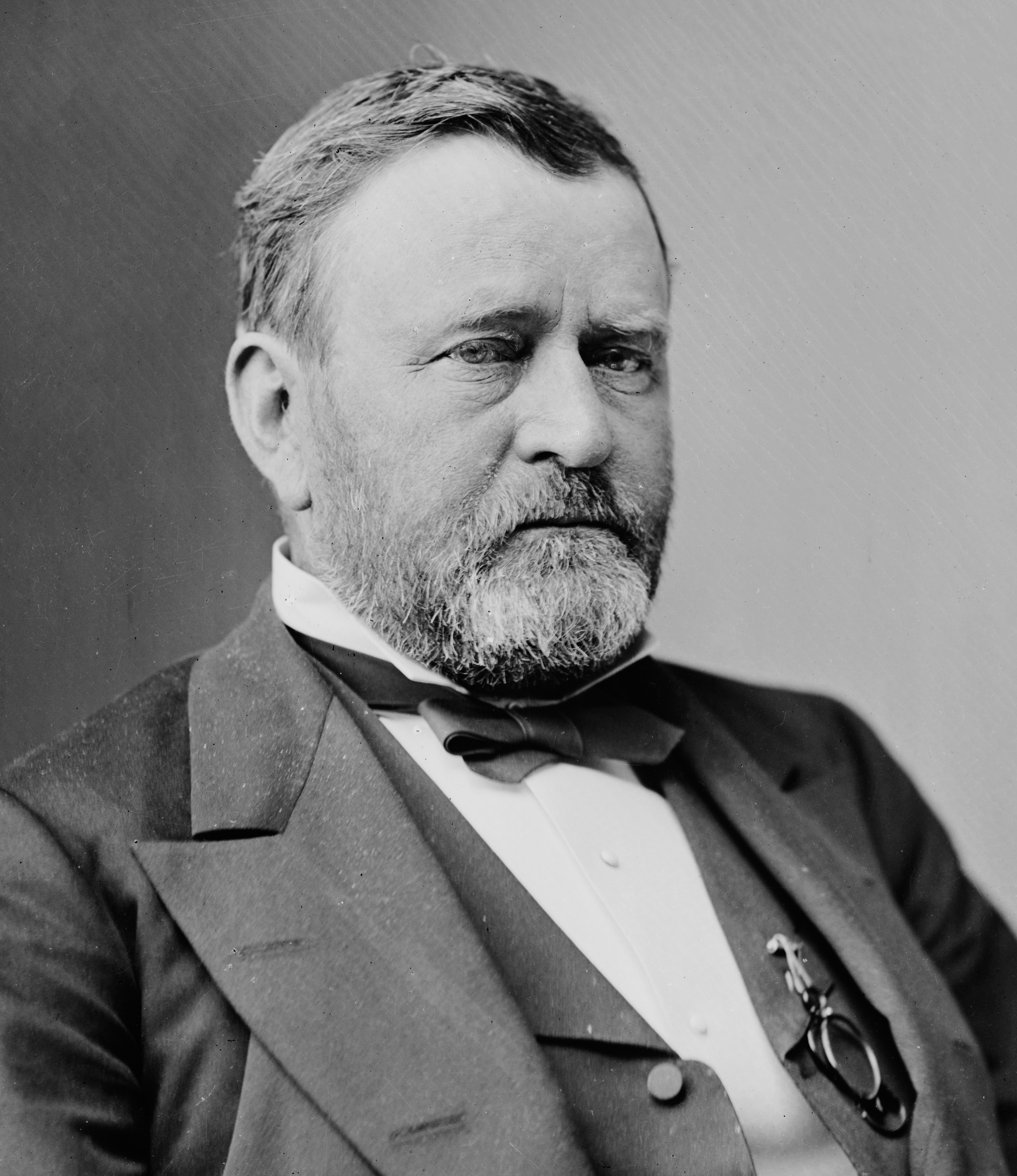

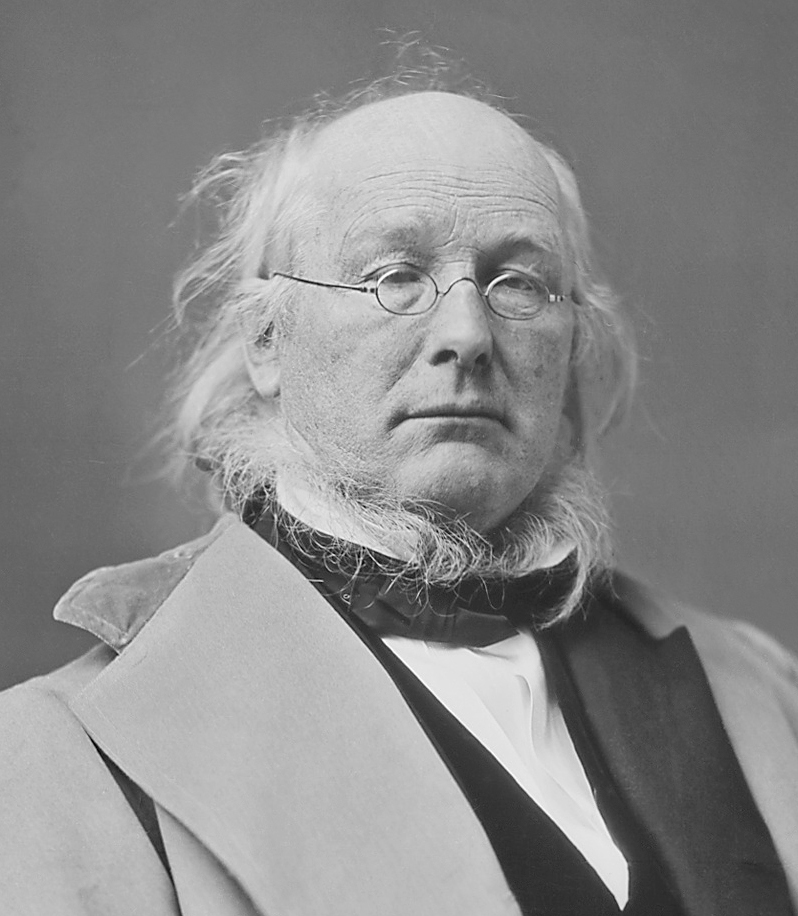
Nominee	Ulysses S. Grant	Horace Greeley
Party	Republican	Liberal Republican
Home state	Illinois	New York
Running mate	Henry Wilson	Benjamin G. Brown
Electoral vote	3	0
Popular vote	11,818	7,742
Percentage	58.66%	38.43%
County results
Grant
40–50%
50–60%
60–70%
70–80%
Greeley
40–50%
50–60%
President before election
Ulysses S. Grant
Republican
Elected President
Ulysses S. Grant
Republican

The 1872 United States presidential election in Oregon took place on November 5, 1872. All contemporary 37 states were part of the 1872 United States presidential election. The state voters chose three electors to the Electoral College, which selected the president and vice president.

Oregon was won by the Republican nominees, incumbent President Ulysses S. Grant of Illinois and his running mate Senator Henry Wilson of Massachusetts. Grant and Wilson defeated the Liberal Republican and Democratic nominees, former Congressman Horace Greeley of New York and his running mate former Senator and Governor Benjamin Gratz Brown of Missouri.

Grant won the state by a margin of 20.23%.

== Results ==
1872 United States presidential election in Oregon
Party	Candidate	Running mate	Popular vote		Electoral vote	
Party	Candidate	Running mate	Count	%	Count	%
Republican	Ulysses S. Grant of Illinois	Henry Wilson of Massachusetts	11,818	58.66%	3	100.00%
Liberal Republican	Horace Greeley of New York	Benjamin Gratz Brown of Missouri	7,742	38.43%	0	0.00%
Bourbon Democrat	Charles O'Conor	John Quincy Adams II	587	2.91%	0	0.00%
Total			20,147	100.00%	3	100.00%

== See also ==
- United States presidential elections in Oregon
