= 1892 United States presidential election in Oregon =

- November 8, 1892
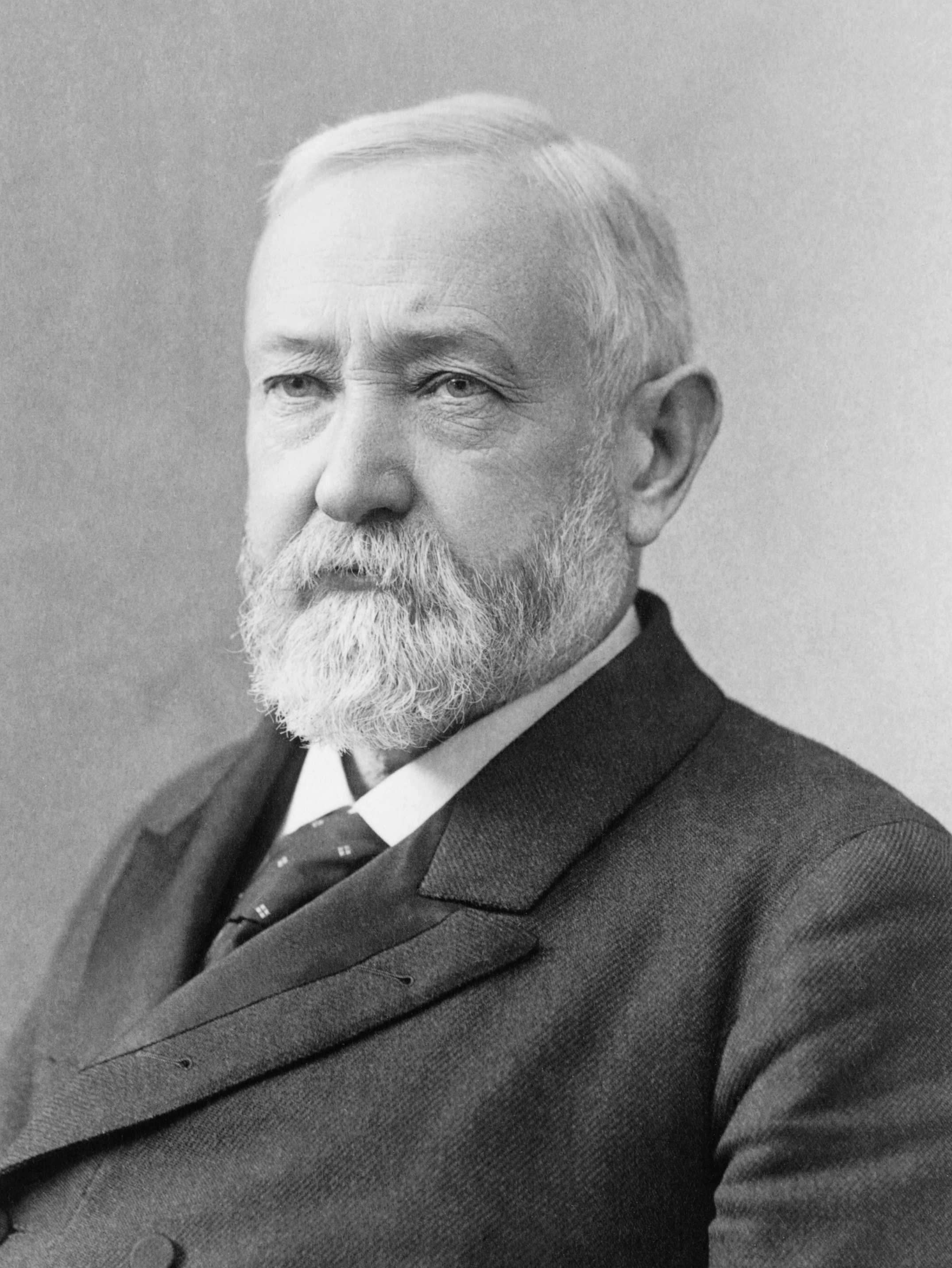

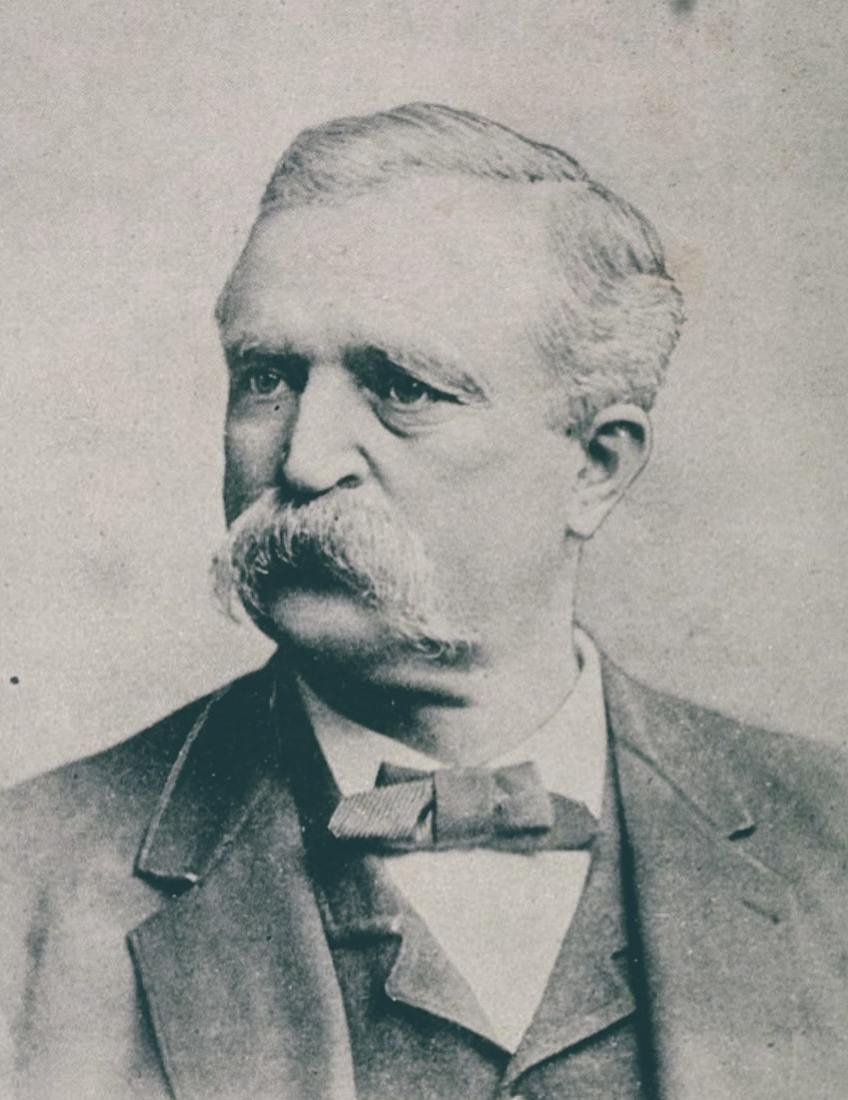

| Nominee | Benjamin Harrison | James B. Weaver | Grover Cleveland |
| Party | Republican | Populist | Democratic |
| Home state | Indiana | Iowa | New York |
| Running mate | Whitelaw Reid | James G. Field | Adlai Stevenson I |
| Electoral vote | 3 | 1 | 0 |
| Popular vote | 35,002 | 26,965 | 14,243 |
| Percentage | 44.59% | 34.35% | 18.15% |
County results
Harrison
40–50%
50–60%
Weaver
40–50%
50–60%
Cleveland
40–50%
President before election
Benjamin Harrison
Republican
Elected President
Grover Cleveland
Democratic

The 1892 United States presidential election in Oregon took place on November 8, 1892. All contemporary 44 states were part of the 1892 United States presidential election. State voters chose four electors to the Electoral College, which selected the president and vice president.

Oregon was won by the Republican nominees, incumbent President Benjamin Harrison of Indiana and his running mate Whitelaw Reid of New York.

== Campaign ==
The Democrats and Populists conducted a partial fusion campaign in Oregon by having Democratic elector Robert A. Miller drop out and the Democratic Party of Oregon endorsed Populist elector I. Nathan Pierce in his place. The Democrats believed that the Populists would do the same for two electors, but the Populists refused. Governor Sylvester Pennoyer left the Democratic Party and joined the Populists in October.

== Results ==
General Election Results
| Party | Pledged to | Elector | Votes |
|---|---|---|---|
| People's Party & Democratic Party | James B. Weaver | Nathan Pierce | 35,813 |
| Republican Party | Benjamin Harrison | John F. Caples | 35,002 |
| Republican Party | Benjamin Harrison | George M. Irwin | 34,932 |
| Republican Party | Benjamin Harrison | David M. Dunne | 34,928 |
| Republican Party | Benjamin Harrison | H. B. Miller | 34,910 |
| People's Party | James B. Weaver | S. H. Holt | 26,965 |
| People's Party | James B. Weaver | W. G. Burleigh | 26,875 |
| People's Party | James B. Weaver | W. H. Galvani | 26,811 |
| Democratic Party | Grover Cleveland | W. F. Butcher | 14,243 |
| Democratic Party | Grover Cleveland | W. M. Colvig | 14,217 |
| Democratic Party | Grover Cleveland | George Noland | 14,207 |
| Prohibition Party | John Bidwell | Gilman Parker | 2,281 |
| Prohibition Party | John Bidwell | A. W. Lucas | 2,267 |
| Prohibition Party | John Bidwell | G. W. Black | 2,258 |
| Prohibition Party | John Bidwell | N. R. Gaylord | 2,250 |
| Votes cast (Note: Based on totals for highest elector on each ticket) | | | 78,491 |

=== Results by county ===
| County | Benjamin Harrison Republican | | Stephen Grover Cleveland Democratic | | James Baird Weaver People's | | John Bidwell Prohibition | | Margin (Note: Because Weaver ran second ahead of Cleveland in Oregon as a whole, all margins and percentage margins given are Harrison vote minus Weaver vote and Harrison percentage minus Weaver percentage unless states otherwise.) | | Total votes cast |
| County | # | % | # | % | # | % | # | % | # | % | Total votes cast |
|---|---|---|---|---|---|---|---|---|---|---|---|
| Baker | 755 | 43.37% | 355 | 20.39% | 620 | 35.61% | 11 | 0.63% | 135 | 7.75% | 1,741 |
| Benton | 1,097 | 45.39% | 689 | 28.51% | 572 | 23.67% | 59 | 2.44% | 408 (Note: In this county where Cleveland did run ahead of Weaver, margin given is Harrison vote minus Cleveland vote and percentage margin Harrison percentage minus Cleveland percentage.) | 16.88% | 2,417 |
| Clackamas | 1,815 | 44.51% | 655 | 16.06% | 1,474 | 36.15% | 134 | 3.29% | 341 | 8.36% | 4,078 |
| Clatsop | 1,148 | 48.89% | 713 | 30.37% | 407 | 17.33% | 80 | 3.41% | 435 | 18.53% | 2,348 |
| Columbia | 682 | 45.86% | 270 | 18.16% | 516 | 34.70% | 19 | 1.28% | 166 | 11.16% | 1,487 |
| Coos | 603 | 31.70% | 299 | 15.72% | 964 | 50.68% | 36 | 1.89% | -361 | -18.98% | 1,902 |
| Crook | 317 | 37.21% | 411 | 48.24% | 120 | 14.08% | 4 | 0.47% | -94 | -11.03% | 852 |
| Curry | 183 | 50.14% | 90 | 24.66% | 87 | 23.84% | 5 | 1.37% | 93 | 25.48% | 365 |
| Douglas | 1,329 | 44.27% | 529 | 17.62% | 1,093 | 36.41% | 51 | 1.70% | 236 | 7.86% | 3,002 |
| Gilliam | 402 | 47.46% | 253 | 29.87% | 185 | 21.84% | 7 | 0.83% | 149 | 17.59% | 847 |
| Grant | 568 | 43.89% | 437 | 33.77% | 281 | 21.72% | 8 | 0.62% | 131 | 10.12% | 1,294 |
| Harney | 213 | 33.18% | 276 | 42.99% | 149 | 23.21% | 4 | 0.62% | -63 | -9.81% | 642 |
| Jackson | 959 | 35.04% | 466 | 17.03% | 1,261 | 46.07% | 51 | 1.86% | -302 | -11.03% | 2,737 |
| Josephine | 502 | 37.21% | 283 | 20.98% | 548 | 40.62% | 16 | 1.19% | -46 | -3.41% | 1,349 |
| Klamath | 269 | 39.85% | 76 | 11.26% | 324 | 48.00% | 6 | 0.89% | -55 | -8.15% | 675 |
| Lake | 237 | 36.57% | 110 | 16.98% | 300 | 46.30% | 1 | 0.15% | -63 | -9.72% | 648 |
| Lane | 1,902 | 45.71% | 828 | 19.90% | 1,334 | 32.06% | 97 | 2.33% | 568 | 13.65% | 4,161 |
| Linn | 1,689 | 39.38% | 630 | 14.69% | 1,784 | 41.59% | 186 | 4.34% | -95 | -2.21% | 4,289 |
| Malheur | 246 | 39.23% | 265 | 42.26% | 97 | 15.47% | 19 | 3.03% | -19 | -3.03% | 627 |
| Marion | 2,979 | 49.77% | 879 | 14.69% | 1,833 | 30.63% | 294 | 4.91% | 1,146 | 19.15% | 5,985 |
| Morrow | 470 | 41.37% | 352 | 30.99% | 301 | 26.50% | 13 | 1.14% | 118 | 10.39% | 1,136 |
| Multnomah | 8,041 | 48.29% | 2,040 | 12.25% | 6,055 | 36.36% | 517 | 3.10% | 1,986 | 11.93% | 16,653 |
| Polk | 943 | 42.81% | 432 | 19.61% | 714 | 32.41% | 114 | 5.17% | 229 | 10.39% | 2,203 |
| Sherman | 289 | 46.31% | 110 | 17.63% | 193 | 30.93% | 32 | 5.13% | 96 | 15.38% | 624 |
| Tillamook | 522 | 55.06% | 258 | 27.22% | 150 | 15.82% | 18 | 1.90% | 264 | 27.85% | 948 |
| Umatilla | 1,446 | 42.13% | 398 | 11.60% | 1,517 | 44.20% | 71 | 2.07% | -71 | -2.07% | 3,432 |
| Union | 1,008 | 34.58% | 586 | 20.10% | 1,290 | 44.25% | 31 | 1.06% | -282 | -9.67% | 2,915 |
| Wallowa | 273 | 32.23% | 81 | 9.56% | 481 | 56.79% | 12 | 1.42% | -208 | -24.56% | 847 |
| Wasco | 1,059 | 49.84% | 497 | 23.39% | 502 | 23.62% | 67 | 3.15% | 557 | 26.21% | 2,125 |
| Washington | 1,587 | 53.27% | 293 | 9.84% | 1,027 | 34.47% | 72 | 2.42% | 560 | 18.80% | 2,979 |
| Yamhill | 1,469 | 46.15% | 682 | 21.43% | 786 | 24.69% | 246 | 7.73% | 683 | 21.46% | 3,183 |
| Totals | 35,002 | 44.59% | 14,243 | 18.15% | 26,965 | 34.35% | 2,281 | 2.91% | 8,037 | 10.24% | 78,491 |

== See also ==
- United States presidential elections in Oregon

== Works cited ==
- Knoles, George (1971). The Presidential Campaign and Election of 1892. Stanford University Press. ISBN 040450969X.
