= 1992 United States presidential election in Oregon =

- November 3, 1992

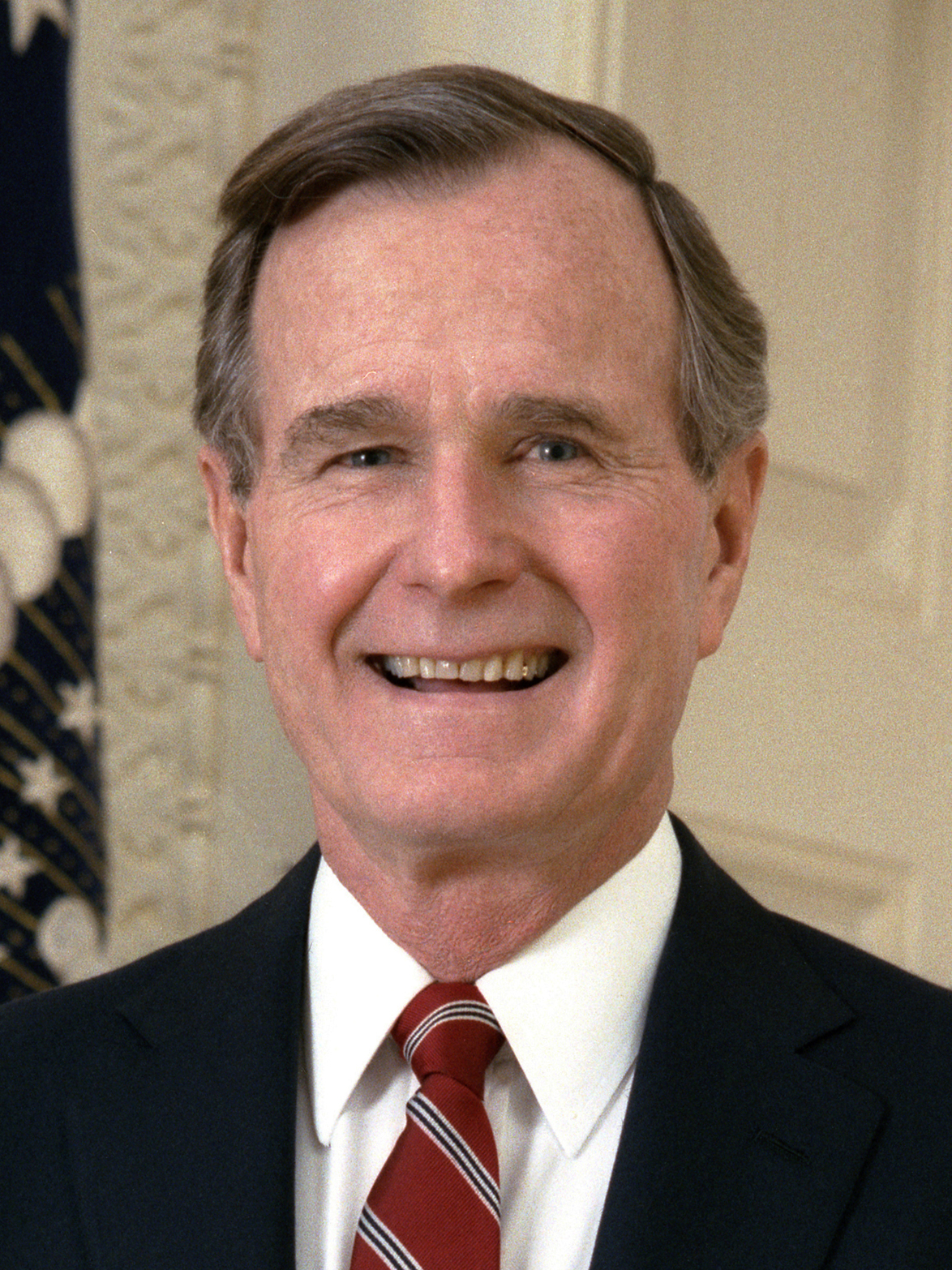

| Nominee | Bill Clinton | George H. W. Bush | Ross Perot |
| Party | Democratic | Republican | Indep. Init. |
| Alliance | | | Independent |
| Home state | Arkansas | Texas | Texas |
| Running mate | Al Gore | Dan Quayle | James Stockdale |
| Electoral vote | 7 | 0 | 0 |
| Popular vote | 621,314 | 475,757 | 354,091 |
| Percentage | 42.48% | 32.53% | 24.21% |
County results
Clinton
30–40%
40–50%
50–60%
Bush
30–40%
40–50%
50–60%
President before election
George H. W. Bush
Republican
Elected President
Bill Clinton
Democratic

The 1992 United States presidential election in Oregon took place on November 3, 1992, as part of the 1992 United States presidential election. Voters chose seven representatives, or electors to the Electoral College, who voted for president and vice president.

Oregon was won by Governor Bill Clinton (D-Arkansas) with 42.48% of the popular vote over incumbent President George H. W. Bush (R-Texas) with 32.53%. Businessman Ross Perot (I-Texas) finished in third, with 24.21% of the popular vote. Clinton ultimately won the national vote, defeating incumbent President Bush.

As of the 2024 presidential election, this is the last time that Curry and Jefferson counties have voted for the Democratic nominee. It was also the first election since 1888 when Crook County had not backed the winning candidate, ending one of the longest bellwether streaks for any county in history, although Bush's margin was less than 200 votes and was only a plurality. Nevertheless, this would mark the county becoming a Republican bastion. Deschutes County, which was narrowly won by Clinton via plurality, would not vote for a Democrat again until 2020.

== Primaries ==
=== Republican ===
Despite having dropped out David Duke received 6,667 votes, worth 2.19% of the popular vote, in the Republican primary in Oregon which caused The Oregonian editorial board to write an editorial entitled "Duke vote a disgrace" where the editorial board criticized the large number of votes for Duke and how Oregon still needed to combat racism.

== Results ==
1992 United States presidential election in Oregon
| Party | Candidate | Votes | Percentage | Electoral votes |
|---|---|---|---|---|
| Democratic | Bill Clinton | 621,314 | 42.48% | 7 |
| Republican | George H. W. Bush (incumbent) | 475,757 | 32.53% | 0 |
| Ind. Init. OR | Ross Perot | 354,091 | 24.21% | 0 |
| Libertarian | Andre Marrou | 4,277 | 0.29% | 0 |
| New Alliance | Lenora Fulani | 3,030 | 0.21% | 0 |
| Other write-ins | | 2,609 | 0.18% | 0 |
| America First | James "Bo" Gritz (write-in) | 1,470 | 0.10% | 0 |
| Natural Law | Dr. John Hagelin (write-in) | 91 | 0.01% | 0 |
| Socialist | J. Quinn Brisben (write-in) | 4 | 0.00% | 0 |
| Totals | | 1,462,643 | 100.0% | 7 |

=== Results by county ===
| County | Bill Clinton Democratic | | George H. W. Bush Republican | | Ross Perot Independent | | Various candidates Other parties | | Margin | | Total votes cast |
| County | # | % | # | % | # | % | # | % | # | % | Total votes cast |
|---|---|---|---|---|---|---|---|---|---|---|---|
| Baker | 2,395 | 31.81% | 2,862 | 38.01% | 2,191 | 29.10% | 82 | 1.09% | -467 | -6.20% | 7,530 |
| Benton | 17,966 | 47.37% | 11,550 | 30.46% | 8,103 | 21.37% | 304 | 0.80% | 6,416 | 16.91% | 37,923 |
| Clackamas | 60,310 | 39.03% | 53,724 | 34.76% | 39,776 | 25.74% | 728 | 0.47% | 6,586 | 4.27% | 154,538 |
| Clatsop | 7,700 | 45.80% | 4,683 | 27.86% | 4,316 | 25.67% | 113 | 0.67% | 3,017 | 17.94% | 16,812 |
| Columbia | 8,298 | 42.77% | 5,227 | 26.94% | 5,670 | 29.22% | 207 | 1.07% | 2,628 (Note: In this county where Bush ran third behind Clinton and Perot, margin given is Clinton vote minus Perot vote and percentage margin Clinton percentage minus Perot percentage.) | 13.55% | 19,402 |
| Coos | 12,072 | 40.70% | 9,284 | 31.30% | 7,989 | 26.94% | 314 | 1.06% | 2,788 | 9.40% | 29,659 |
| Crook | 2,508 | 34.49% | 2,703 | 37.18% | 2,024 | 27.84% | 36 | 0.50% | -195 | -2.69% | 7,271 |
| Curry | 3,841 | 34.76% | 3,809 | 34.47% | 3,310 | 29.95% | 90 | 0.81% | 32 | 0.29% | 11,050 |
| Deschutes | 15,693 | 35.73% | 15,655 | 35.65% | 12,293 | 27.99% | 277 | 0.63% | 38 | 0.08% | 43,918 |
| Douglas | 14,137 | 30.83% | 19,011 | 41.45% | 12,377 | 26.99% | 335 | 0.73% | -4,874 | -10.62% | 45,860 |
| Gilliam | 374 | 36.03% | 377 | 36.32% | 283 | 27.26% | 4 | 0.39% | -3 | -0.29% | 1,038 |
| Grant | 1,135 | 28.47% | 1,496 | 37.53% | 1,302 | 32.66% | 53 | 1.33% | -194 (Note: In this county where Clinton ran third behind Bush and Perot, margin given is Bush vote minus Perot vote and percentage margin Bush percentage minus Perot percentage.) | 4.87% | 3,986 |
| Harney | 973 | 28.86% | 1,350 | 40.04% | 1,024 | 30.37% | 25 | 0.74% | -326 | 9.67% | 3,372 |
| Hood River | 3,106 | 39.61% | 2,453 | 31.28% | 2,235 | 28.50% | 47 | 0.60% | 653 | 8.33% | 7,841 |
| Jackson | 29,146 | 37.80% | 28,704 | 37.23% | 18,633 | 24.17% | 613 | 0.80% | 442 | 0.57% | 77,096 |
| Jefferson | 2,161 | 36.59% | 1,962 | 33.22% | 1,741 | 29.48% | 42 | 0.71% | 199 | 3.37% | 5,906 |
| Josephine | 11,007 | 32.80% | 13,003 | 38.75% | 8,426 | 25.11% | 1,123 | 3.35% | -1,996 | -5.95% | 33,559 |
| Klamath | 7,918 | 29.77% | 11,864 | 44.61% | 6,636 | 24.95% | 175 | 0.66% | -3,946 | -14.84% | 26,593 |
| Lake | 1,019 | 26.80% | 1,791 | 47.11% | 980 | 25.78% | 12 | 0.32% | -772 | -20.31% | 3,802 |
| Lane | 74,083 | 48.78% | 41,789 | 27.52% | 34,906 | 22.99% | 1,084 | 0.71% | 32,294 | 21.26% | 151,862 |
| Lincoln | 9,603 | 44.41% | 5,716 | 26.43% | 6,127 | 28.34% | 177 | 0.82% | 3,476 | 16.07% | 21,623 |
| Linn | 15,399 | 34.00% | 16,461 | 36.35% | 13,256 | 29.27% | 171 | 0.38% | -1,062 | -2.35% | 45,287 |
| Malheur | 2,539 | 23.81% | 5,374 | 50.40% | 2,654 | 24.89% | 96 | 0.90% | -2,720 | 25.51% | 10,663 |
| Marion | 41,137 | 37.28% | 42,145 | 38.20% | 26,156 | 23.71% | 896 | 0.81% | -1,008 | -0.92% | 110,334 |
| Morrow | 1,174 | 33.79% | 1,187 | 34.17% | 1,089 | 31.35% | 24 | 0.69% | -13 | -0.38% | 3,474 |
| Multnomah | 165,081 | 55.34% | 72,326 | 24.25% | 58,236 | 19.52% | 2,648 | 0.89% | 92,755 | 31.09% | 298,291 |
| Polk | 9,551 | 37.29% | 10,082 | 39.36% | 5,818 | 22.71% | 163 | 0.64% | -531 | -2.07% | 25,614 |
| Sherman | 362 | 32.44% | 424 | 37.99% | 326 | 29.21% | 4 | 0.36% | -62 | -5.55% | 1,116 |
| Tillamook | 5,040 | 43.89% | 3,359 | 29.25% | 2,997 | 26.10% | 88 | 0.77% | 1,681 | 14.64% | 11,484 |
| Umatilla | 6,787 | 34.55% | 7,095 | 36.12% | 5,581 | 28.41% | 180 | 0.92% | -308 | -1.57% | 19,643 |
| Union | 3,990 | 34.43% | 4,223 | 36.44% | 3,305 | 28.52% | 70 | 0.60% | -233 | -2.01% | 11,588 |
| Wallowa | 1,203 | 29.53% | 1,630 | 40.01% | 1,209 | 29.68% | 32 | 0.79% | -421 | 10.33% | 4,074 |
| Wasco | 4,663 | 42.50% | 3,242 | 29.55% | 3,008 | 27.41% | 60 | 0.55% | 1,421 | 12.95% | 10,973 |
| Washington | 67,528 | 40.39% | 57,146 | 34.18% | 41,575 | 24.87% | 946 | 0.57% | 10,382 | 6.21% | 167,195 |
| Wheeler | 267 | 31.05% | 357 | 41.51% | 227 | 26.40% | 9 | 1.05% | -90 | -10.46% | 860 |
| Yamhill | 11,148 | 35.50% | 11,693 | 37.23% | 8,312 | 26.47% | 253 | 0.81% | -545 | -1.73% | 31,406 |
| Totals | 621,314 | 42.48% | 475,757 | 32.53% | 354,091 | 24.21% | 11,481 | 0.78% | 145,557 | 9.95% | 1,462,643 |

==== Counties that flipped from Republican to Democratic ====
- Clackamas
- Curry
- Deschutes
- Jackson
- Jefferson
- Washington

== See also ==
- United States presidential elections in Oregon
- Presidency of Bill Clinton
