= 1884 United States presidential election in Oregon =

- November 4, 1884
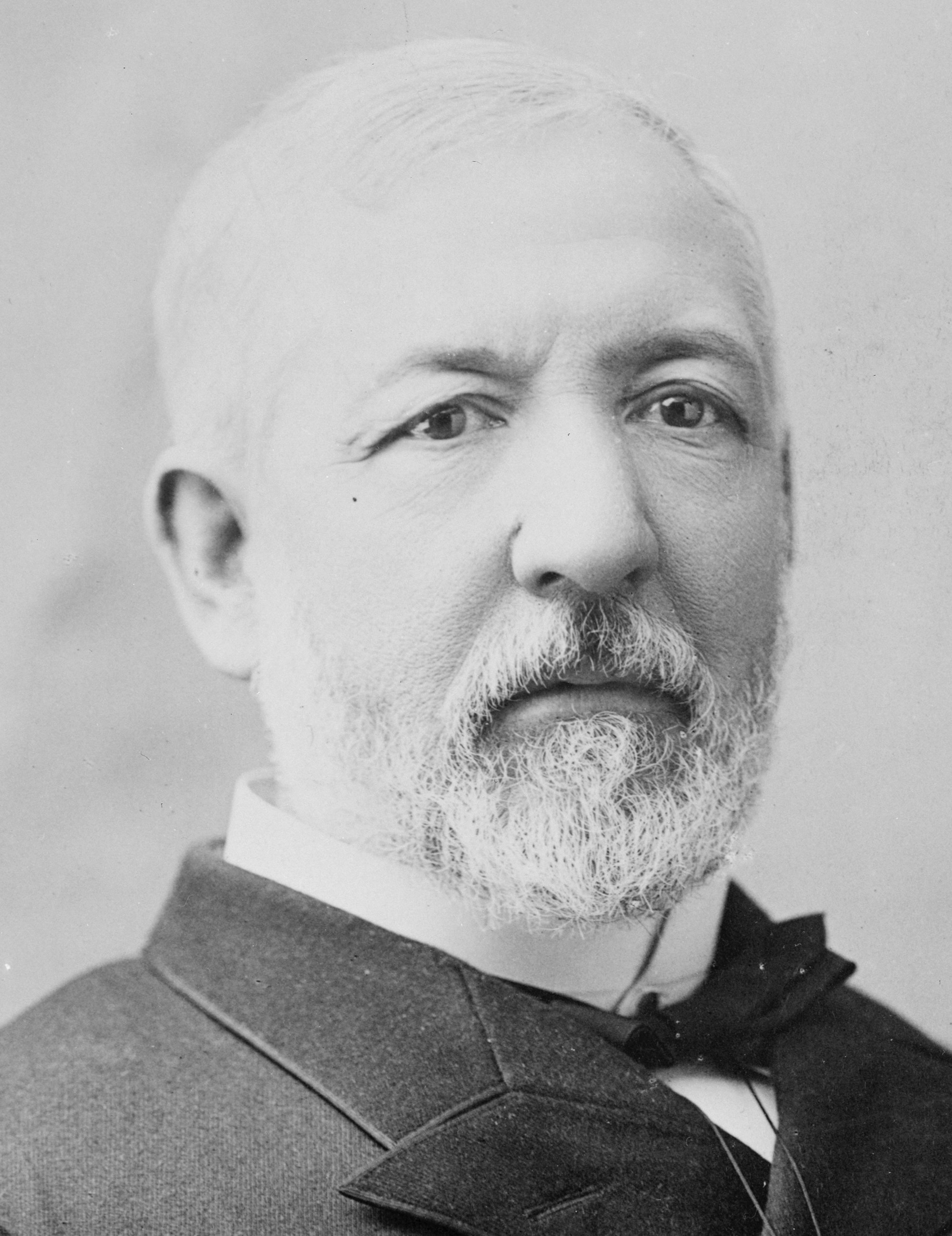

| Nominee | James G. Blaine | Grover Cleveland |
| Party | Republican | Democratic |
| Home state | Maine | New York |
| Running mate | John A. Logan | Thomas A. Hendricks |
| Electoral vote | 3 | 0 |
| Popular vote | 26,680 | 24,604 |
| Percentage | 50.99% | 46.70% |
County results
Blaine
40–50%
50–60%
Cleveland
50–60%
President before election
Chester A. Arthur
Republican
Elected President
Grover Cleveland
Democratic

The 1884 United States presidential election in Oregon took place on November 4, 1884. All contemporary 38 states were part of the 1884 United States presidential election. Voters chose three electors to the Electoral College, which selected the president and vice president.

Oregon was won by Secretary of State James G. Blaine (R-Maine), running with Senator John A. Logan, with 50.99% of the vote, against Grover Cleveland, the 28th governor of New York, (D–New York), running with the former governor of Indiana Thomas A. Hendricks, with 46.70% of the popular vote. Blaine won the state by a narrow margin of 4.29%.

The Greenback and Anti-Monopoly Parties both chose major general and former governor of Massachusetts Benjamin Butler and Absolom M. West, an unseated Mississippi representative, received 1.38% of the popular vote.

The Prohibition party chose the 8th Governor of Kansas, John St. John and Maryland State Representative William Daniel, received 0.93% of the popular vote.

== Results ==
1884 United States presidential election in Oregon
| Party | Candidate | Running mate | Popular vote | | Electoral vote | |
| Party | Candidate | Running mate | Count | % | Count | % |
|---|---|---|---|---|---|---|
| Republican | James Gillespie Blaine of Maine | John Alexander Logan of Illinois | 26,860 | 50.99% | 3 | 100.00% |
| Democratic | Grover Cleveland of New York | Thomas Andrews Hendricks of Indiana | 24,604 | 46.70% | 0 | 0.00% |
| Greenback | Benjamin Franklin Butler of Massachusetts | Absolom Madden West of Mississippi | 726 | 1.38% | 0 | 0.00% |
| Prohibition | John Pierce St. John of Kansas | William Daniel of Maryland | 492 | 0.93% | 0 | 0.00% |
| Total | | | 52,682 | 100.00% | 3 | 100.00% |

=== Results by county ===
| County | James Gillespie Blaine Republican | | Stephen Grover Cleveland Democratic | | Various candidates Other parties | | Margin | | Total votes cast |
| County | # | % | # | % | # | % | # | % | Total votes cast |
|---|---|---|---|---|---|---|---|---|---|
| Baker | 810 | 45.15% | 966 | 53.85% | 18 | 1.00% | -156 | -8.70% | 1,794 |
| Benton | 982 | 47.46% | 966 | 46.69% | 121 | 5.85% | 16 | 0.77% | 2,069 |
| Clackamas | 1,381 | 55.31% | 1,015 | 40.65% | 101 | 4.04% | 366 | 14.66% | 2,497 |
| Clatsop | 872 | 56.22% | 670 | 43.20% | 9 | 0.58% | 202 | 13.02% | 1,551 |
| Columbia | 451 | 59.03% | 296 | 38.74% | 17 | 2.23% | 155 | 20.29% | 764 |
| Coos | 758 | 52.38% | 638 | 44.09% | 51 | 3.52% | 120 | 8.29% | 1,447 |
| Crook | 315 | 42.28% | 426 | 57.18% | 4 | 0.54% | -111 | -14.90% | 745 |
| Curry | 176 | 52.54% | 133 | 39.70% | 26 | 7.76% | 43 | 12.84% | 335 |
| Douglas | 1,216 | 51.20% | 1,125 | 47.37% | 34 | 1.43% | 91 | 3.83% | 2,375 |
| Grant | 645 | 48.10% | 679 | 50.63% | 17 | 1.27% | -34 | -2.54% | 1,341 |
| Jackson | 947 | 41.61% | 1,251 | 54.96% | 78 | 3.43% | -304 | -13.36% | 2,276 |
| Josephine | 244 | 44.36% | 303 | 55.09% | 3 | 0.55% | -59 | -10.73% | 550 |
| Klamath | 155 | 46.69% | 177 | 53.31% | 0 | 0.00% | -22 | -6.63% | 332 |
| Lake | 160 | 41.24% | 220 | 56.70% | 8 | 2.06% | -60 | -15.46% | 388 |
| Lane | 1,251 | 48.92% | 1,232 | 48.18% | 74 | 2.89% | 19 | 0.74% | 2,557 |
| Linn | 1,444 | 45.60% | 1,641 | 51.82% | 82 | 2.59% | -197 | -6.22% | 3,167 |
| Marion | 2,193 | 56.07% | 1,627 | 41.60% | 91 | 2.33% | 566 | 14.47% | 3,911 |
| Multnomah | 5,058 | 55.99% | 3,880 | 42.95% | 95 | 1.05% | 1,178 | 13.04% | 9,033 |
| Polk | 759 | 48.28% | 748 | 47.58% | 65 | 4.13% | 11 | 0.70% | 1,572 |
| Tillamook | 202 | 51.79% | 155 | 39.74% | 33 | 8.46% | 47 | 12.05% | 390 |
| Umatilla | 1,861 | 47.38% | 2,003 | 50.99% | 64 | 1.63% | -142 | -3.62% | 3,928 |
| Union | 1,216 | 47.70% | 1,293 | 50.73% | 40 | 1.57% | -77 | -3.02% | 2,549 |
| Wasco | 1,634 | 53.70% | 1,360 | 44.69% | 49 | 1.61% | 274 | 9.00% | 3,043 |
| Washington | 946 | 51.22% | 766 | 41.47% | 135 | 7.31% | 180 | 9.75% | 1,847 |
| Yamhill | 1,184 | 52.23% | 1,034 | 45.61% | 49 | 2.16% | 150 | 6.62% | 2,267 |
| Totals | 26,860 | 50.94% | 24,604 | 46.66% | 1,264 | 2.40% | 2,256 | 4.28% | 52,728 |

== See also ==
- United States presidential elections in Oregon
