= 1964 United States presidential election in Oregon =

- November 3, 1964

Nominee	Lyndon B. Johnson	Barry Goldwater
Party	Democratic	Republican
Home state	Texas	Arizona
Running mate	Hubert Humphrey	William E. Miller
Electoral vote	6	0
Popular vote	501,017	282,779
Percentage	63.72%	35.96%
County results
Johnson
50–60%
60–70%
70–80%
Goldwater
50–60%
President before election
Lyndon B. Johnson
Democratic
Elected President
Lyndon B. Johnson
Democratic

The 1964 United States presidential election in Oregon took place on November 3, 1964, as part of the 1964 United States presidential election. Voters chose six representatives, or electors, to the Electoral College, who voted for president and vice president.

Oregon was overwhelmingly won by incumbent President Lyndon B. Johnson (D–Texas), with 63.72% of the popular vote, against Senator Barry Goldwater (R–Arizona), with 35.96% of the popular vote. Johnson's victory marked the first time Oregon had voted for a Democratic presidential nominee since Franklin D. Roosevelt's landslide win in 1944. As of the 2024 presidential election, this is the last election in which the following counties voted for a Democratic presidential candidate: Baker, Douglas, Grant, Harney, Klamath, Lake, Polk, Sherman, Umatilla, Union, Wallowa, and Yamhill. Furthermore, Oregon as a whole, along with Benton and Hood River counties would not vote for a Democratic presidential candidate again until 1988, after which it has always gone Democratic. Clackamas, Jackson, Jefferson, and Washington counties would not vote Democratic again until 1992, while Gilliam and Marion counties would not vote Democratic again until 1996. This is also the last time that a Democratic presidential nominee has carried a majority of Oregon's counties.

== Results ==
1964 United States presidential election in Oregon
Party	Candidate	Votes	%
Democratic	Lyndon B. Johnson (inc.)	501,017	63.72%
Republican	Barry Goldwater	282,779	35.96%
Write-in		2,509	0.32%
Total votes		786,305	100%

=== Results by county ===
County	Lyndon B. Johnson Democratic		Barry Goldwater Republican		Various candidates Write-ins		Margin		Total votes cast
County	#	%	#	%	#	%	#	%	Total votes cast
Baker	3,903	59.27%	2,670	40.55%	12	0.18%	1,233	18.72%	6,585
Benton	8,971	54.42%	7,250	43.98%	265	1.61%	1,721	10.44%	16,486
Clackamas	35,711	62.60%	21,299	37.34%	33	0.06%	14,412	25.26%	57,043
Clatsop	8,371	67.44%	4,023	32.41%	19	0.15%	4,348	35.03%	12,413
Columbia	7,728	75.26%	2,489	24.24%	51	0.50%	5,239	51.02%	10,268
Coos	16,109	76.17%	5,032	23.79%	8	0.04%	11,077	52.38%	21,149
Crook	2,419	67.46%	1,161	32.38%	6	0.17%	1,258	35.08%	3,586
Curry	3,195	68.18%	1,467	31.31%	24	0.51%	1,728	36.87%	4,686
Deschutes	6,947	68.82%	3,148	31.18%			3,799	37.64%	10,095
Douglas	15,909	61.86%	9,806	38.13%	2	0.01%	6,103	23.73%	25,717
Gilliam	775	63.52%	442	36.23%	3	0.25%	333	27.29%	1,220
Grant	1,877	61.91%	1,149	37.90%	6	0.20%	728	24.01%	3,032
Harney	1,577	57.16%	1,172	42.48%	10	0.36%	405	14.68%	2,759
Hood River	3,564	65.13%	1,786	32.64%	122	2.23%	1,778	32.49%	5,472
Jackson	19,486	57.17%	14,598	42.83%			4,888	14.34%	34,084
Jefferson	1,739	59.19%	1,197	40.74%	2	0.07%	542	18.45%	2,938
Josephine	6,857	49.68%	6,918	50.13%	26	0.19%	−61	−0.45%	13,801
Klamath	9,066	51.51%	8,530	48.47%	3	0.02%	536	3.04%	17,599
Lake	1,419	52.11%	1,304	47.89%			115	4.22%	2,723
Lane	49,785	67.10%	24,139	32.53%	276	0.37%	25,646	34.57%	74,200
Lincoln	7,101	68.79%	3,200	31.00%	22	0.21%	3,901	37.79%	10,323
Linn	14,926	64.04%	8,382	35.96%			6,544	28.08%	23,308
Malheur	3,798	47.58%	4,177	52.32%	8	0.10%	−379	−4.74%	7,983
Marion	32,091	62.67%	18,897	36.90%	221	0.43%	13,194	25.77%	51,209
Morrow	1,470	70.10%	627	29.90%			843	40.20%	2,097
Multnomah	161,040	66.07%	81,683	33.51%	1,016	0.42%	79,357	32.56%	243,739
Polk	7,292	62.71%	4,319	37.14%	18	0.15%	2,973	25.57%	11,629
Sherman	859	63.49%	494	36.51%			365	26.98%	1,353
Tillamook	5,246	69.27%	2,318	30.61%	9	0.12%	2,928	38.66%	7,573
Umatilla	10,689	63.40%	6,138	36.41%	32	0.19%	4,551	26.99%	16,859
Union	4,929	65.82%	2,553	34.09%	7	0.09%	2,376	31.73%	7,489
Wallowa	1,790	62.85%	1,055	37.04%	3	0.11%	735	25.81%	2,848
Wasco	5,890	68.51%	2,695	31.35%	12	0.14%	3,195	37.16%	8,597
Washington	29,081	57.95%	20,813	41.48%	287	0.57%	8,268	16.47%	50,181
Wheeler	458	57.39%	340	42.61%			118	14.78%	798
Yamhill	8,949	61.88%	5,508	38.08%	6	0.04%	3,441	23.80%	14,463
Totals	501,017	63.72%	282,779	35.96%	2,509	0.32%	218,238	27.76%	786,305

==== Counties that flipped from Republican to Democratic ====
- Benton
- Clackamas
- Deschutes
- Gilliam
- Grant
- Harney
- Hood River
- Jackson
- Jefferson
- Klamath
- Lake
- Lane
- Linn
- Marion
- Polk
- Sherman
- Umatilla
- Multnomah
- Washington
- Wheeler
- Yamhill

== See also ==
- United States presidential elections in Oregon
