= 1944 United States presidential election in Oregon =

- November 7, 1944

All 6 Oregon votes to the Electoral College

Nominee	Franklin D. Roosevelt	Thomas Dewey
Party	Democratic	Republican
Home state	New York	New York
Running mate	Harry Truman	John Bricker
Electoral vote	6	0
Popular vote	248,635	225,365
Percentage	51.78%	46.94%
County results
Roosevelt
40–50%
50–60%
60–70%
Dewey
50–60%
60–70%
President before election
Franklin D. Roosevelt
Democratic
Elected President
Franklin D. Roosevelt
Democratic

The 1944 United States presidential election in Oregon took place on November 7, 1944, as part of the 1944 United States presidential election. Voters chose six representatives, or electors, to the Electoral College, who voted for president and vice president.

Oregon was won by then president Franklin D. Roosevelt over Governor of New York Thomas Dewey by a slim margin of 4.85%. This would mark the last Democratic victory for a presidential candidate in Oregon until 1964.

== Results ==
1944 United States presidential election in Oregon
Party	Candidate	Votes	%
Democratic	Franklin D. Roosevelt (inc.)	248,635	51.78%
Republican	Thomas Dewey	225,365	46.94%
Independent	Norman Thomas	3,785	0.79%
Independent	Claude Watson	2,362	0.49%
Total votes		480,147	100%

=== Results by county ===
County	Franklin D. Roosevelt Democratic		Thomas E. Dewey Republican		Various candidates Other parties		Margin		Total votes cast
County	#	%	#	%	#	%	#	%	Total votes cast
Baker	3,116	55.24%	2,494	44.21%	31	0.55%	622	11.03%	5,641
Benton	2,830	34.76%	5,242	64.39%	69	0.85%	-2,412	-29.63%	8,141
Clackamas	14,060	52.10%	12,492	46.29%	435	1.61%	1,568	5.81%	26,987
Clatsop	6,038	60.19%	3,921	39.09%	72	0.72%	2,117	21.10%	10,031
Columbia	5,213	64.77%	2,696	33.49%	140	1.74%	2,517	31.27%	8,049
Coos	6,476	57.69%	4,609	41.06%	140	1.25%	1,867	16.63%	11,225
Crook	1,145	54.39%	932	44.28%	28	1.33%	213	10.12%	2,105
Curry	678	44.40%	827	54.16%	22	1.44%	-149	-9.76%	1,527
Deschutes	3,807	59.24%	2,547	39.64%	72	1.12%	1,260	19.61%	6,426
Douglas	4,563	42.09%	6,134	56.59%	143	1.32%	-1,571	-14.49%	10,840
Gilliam	567	53.49%	492	46.42%	1	0.09%	75	7.08%	1,060
Grant	1,072	48.66%	1,006	45.67%	125	5.67%	66	3.00%	2,203
Harney	997	55.57%	787	43.87%	10	0.56%	210	11.71%	1,794
Hood River	1,960	48.85%	2,008	50.05%	44	1.10%	-48	-1.20%	4,012
Jackson	6,668	43.23%	8,598	55.74%	160	1.04%	-1,930	-12.51%	15,426
Jefferson	297	41.08%	419	57.95%	7	0.97%	-122	-16.87%	723
Josephine	3,214	43.70%	4,010	54.52%	131	1.78%	-796	-10.82%	7,355
Klamath	6,656	52.34%	5,969	46.94%	92	0.72%	687	5.40%	12,717
Lake	1,147	52.88%	1,008	46.47%	14	0.65%	139	6.41%	2,169
Lane	14,375	44.37%	17,690	54.60%	332	1.02%	-3,315	-10.23%	32,397
Lincoln	2,947	50.70%	2,801	48.19%	65	1.12%	146	2.51%	5,813
Linn	6,480	48.02%	6,877	50.97%	136	1.01%	-397	-2.94%	13,493
Malheur	2,234	43.99%	2,797	55.08%	47	0.93%	-563	-11.09%	5,078
Marion	11,907	41.63%	16,176	56.56%	518	1.81%	-4,269	-14.93%	28,601
Morrow	836	52.38%	747	46.80%	13	0.81%	89	5.58%	1,596
Multnomah	105,516	56.66%	78,279	42.04%	2,423	1.30%	27,237	14.63%	186,218
Polk	3,318	45.20%	3,904	53.19%	118	1.61%	-586	-7.98%	7,340
Sherman	518	52.01%	475	47.69%	3	0.30%	43	4.32%	996
Tillamook	2,634	50.79%	2,477	47.76%	75	1.45%	157	3.03%	5,186
Umatilla	4,967	47.80%	5,379	51.77%	45	0.43%	-412	-3.96%	10,391
Union	3,951	61.50%	2,413	37.56%	60	0.93%	1,538	23.94%	6,424
Wallowa	1,544	56.74%	1,152	42.34%	25	0.92%	392	14.41%	2,721
Wasco	2,313	48.33%	2,429	50.75%	44	0.92%	-116	-2.42%	4,786
Washington	9,110	48.78%	9,362	50.13%	205	1.10%	-252	-1.35%	18,677
Wheeler	414	43.04%	544	56.55%	4	0.42%	-130	-13.51%	962
Yamhill	5,067	45.91%	5,672	51.39%	298	2.70%	-605	-5.48%	11,037
Totals	248,635	51.78%	225,365	46.94%	6,147	1.28%	23,270	4.85%	480,147

==== Counties that flipped from Democratic to Republican ====
- Curry
- Hood River
- Jefferson
- Lane
- Malheur
- Washington
- Wasco
- Yamhill

== See also ==
- United States presidential elections in Oregon
