= 1888 United States presidential election in Oregon =

- November 6, 1888
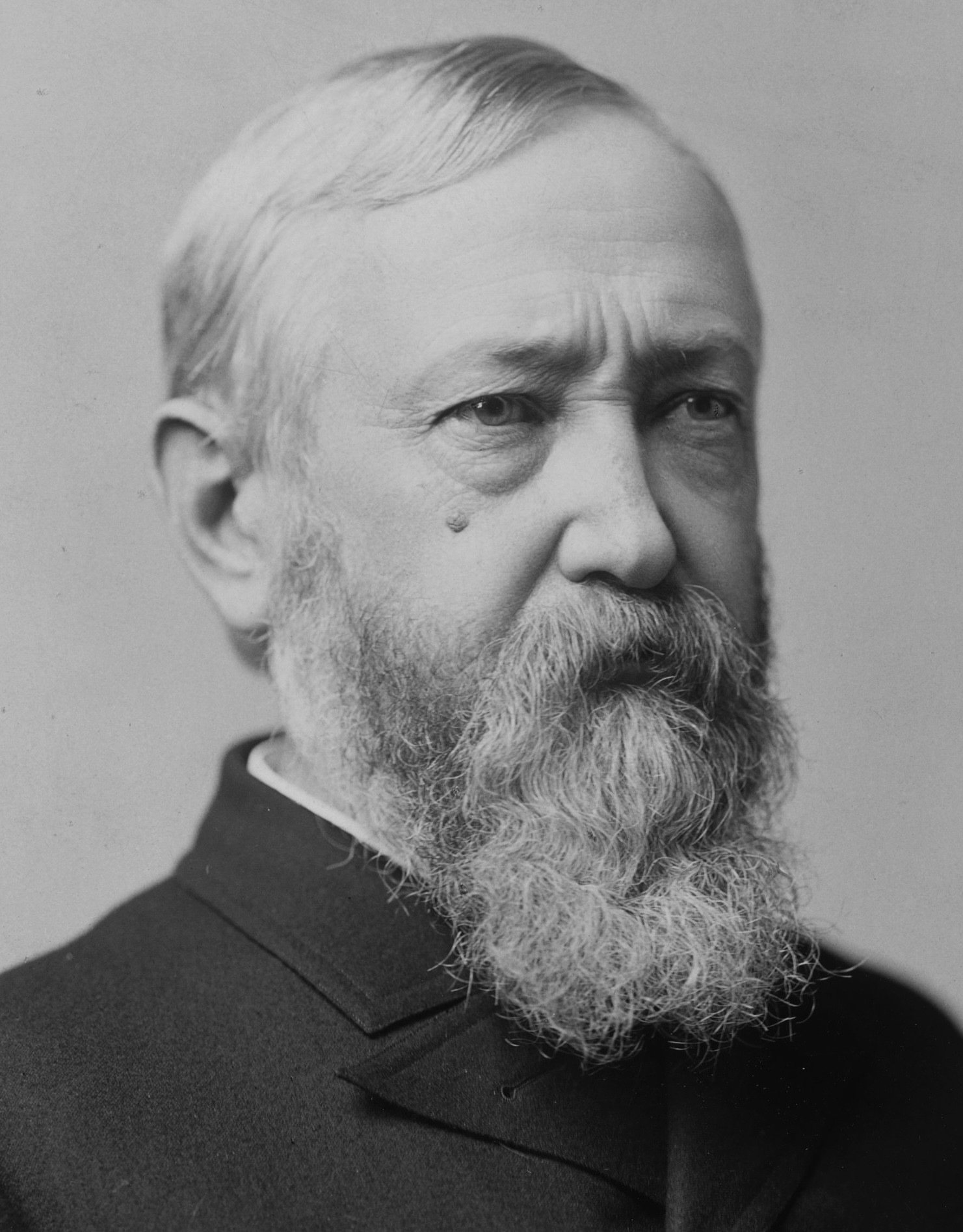

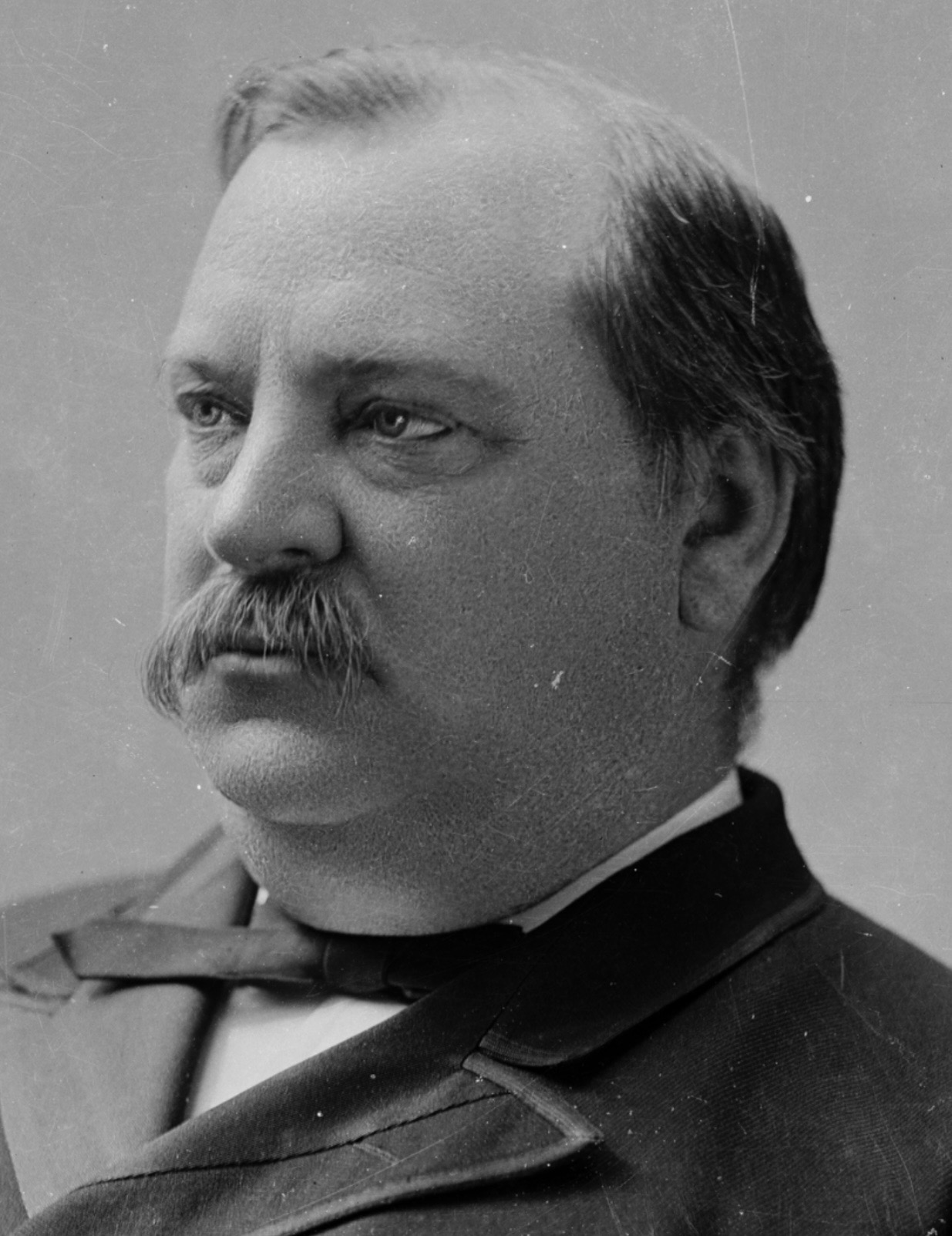
| Nominee | Benjamin Harrison | Grover Cleveland |
| Party | Republican | Democratic |
| Home state | Indiana | New York |
| Running mate | Levi P. Morton | Allen G. Thurman |
| Electoral vote | 3 | 0 |
| Popular vote | 33,291 | 26,522 |
| Percentage | 53.78% | 42.84% |
County results
Harrison
40–50%
50–60%
60–70%
Cleveland
40–50%
50–60%
President before election
Grover Cleveland
Democratic
Elected President
Benjamin Harrison
Republican

The 1888 United States presidential election in Oregon took place on November 6, 1888, as part of the 1888 United States presidential election. Voters chose three representatives, or electors to the Electoral College, who voted for president and vice president.

Oregon voted for the Republican nominee, Benjamin Harrison, over the Democratic nominee, incumbent President Grover Cleveland. Harrison won the state by a margin of 10.94%.

== Results ==
General Election Results
| Party | Pledged to | Elector | Votes |
|---|---|---|---|
| Republican Party | Benjamin Harrison | C. W. Fulton | 33,291 |
| Republican Party | Benjamin Harrison | Robert McLean | 33,260 |
| Republican Party | Benjamin Harrison | William Kapus | 33,256 |
| Democratic Party | Grover Cleveland | W. R. Bilyen | 26,522 |
| Democratic Party | Grover Cleveland | W. H. Effinger | 26,518 |
| Democratic Party | Grover Cleveland | E. R. Skipworth | 26,518 |
| Prohibition Party | Clinton B. Fisk | T. F. Campbell | 1,677 |
| Prohibition Party | Clinton B. Fisk | A. C. Kinney | 1,676 |
| Prohibition Party | Clinton B. Fisk | B. F. Ramp | 1,674 |
| Union Labor Party | Alson Streeter | E. P. Hammond | 363 |
| Union Labor Party | Alson Streeter | H. R. Wilson | 362 |
| Union Labor Party | Alson Streeter | J. F. Hendrix | 351 |
| Scattering | | | 53 |
| Votes cast (Note: Based on totals for highest elector on each ticket) | | | 61,906 |

=== Results by county ===
| County | Benjamin Harrison Republican | | Stephen Grover Cleveland Democratic | | Clinton Bowen Fisk Prohibition | | Alson Streeter Union Labor Party | | Margin | | Total votes cast |
| County | # | % | # | % | # | % | # | % | # | % | Total votes cast |
|---|---|---|---|---|---|---|---|---|---|---|---|
| Baker | 843 | 52.46% | 747 | 46.48% | 9 | 0.56% | 8 | 0.50% | 96 | 5.97% | 1,607 |
| Benton | 1,206 | 53.36% | 969 | 42.88% | 66 | 2.92% | 18 | 0.80% | 237 | 10.49% | 2,260 (Note: 1 scattering vote) |
| Clackamas | 1,527 | 56.39% | 1,005 | 37.11% | 56 | 2.07% | 120 | 4.43% | 522 | 19.28% | 2,708 |
| Clatsop | 1,060 | 60.33% | 647 | 36.82% | 50 | 2.85% | 0 | 0.00% | 413 | 23.51% | 1,757 |
| Columbia | 611 | 63.71% | 335 | 34.93% | 8 | 0.83% | 3 | 0.31% | 276 | 28.78% | 959 (Note: 2 scattering votes) |
| Coos | 906 | 50.42% | 779 | 43.35% | 83 | 4.62% | 29 | 1.61% | 127 | 7.07% | 1,797 |
| Crook | 438 | 44.83% | 522 | 53.43% | 17 | 1.74% | 0 | 0.00% | -84 | -8.60% | 977 |
| Curry | 234 | 62.07% | 143 | 37.93% | 0 | 0.00% | 0 | 0.00% | 91 | 24.14% | 377 |
| Douglas | 1,305 | 51.72% | 1,117 | 44.27% | 97 | 3.84% | 2 | 0.08% | 188 | 7.45% | 2,523 (Note: 2 scattering votes) |
| Gilliam | 601 | 56.97% | 440 | 41.71% | 8 | 0.76% | 6 | 0.57% | 161 | 15.26% | 1,055 |
| Grant | 971 | 50.13% | 933 | 48.17% | 31 | 1.60% | 0 | 0.00% | 38 | 1.96% | 1,937 (Note: 2 scattering votes) |
| Jackson | 1,181 | 45.81% | 1,320 | 51.20% | 64 | 2.48% | 13 | 0.50% | -139 | -5.39% | 2,578 |
| Josephine | 535 | 50.09% | 528 | 49.44% | 4 | 0.37% | 0 | 0.00% | 7 | 0.66% | 1,068 (Note: 1 scattering vote) |
| Klamath | 315 | 43.03% | 405 | 55.33% | 10 | 1.37% | 0 | 0.00% | -90 | -12.30% | 732 (Note: 2 scattering votes) |
| Lake | 358 | 48.58% | 371 | 50.34% | 8 | 1.09% | 0 | 0.00% | -13 | -1.76% | 737 |
| Lane | 1,593 | 51.60% | 1,368 | 44.31% | 89 | 2.88% | 37 | 1.20% | 225 | 7.29% | 3,087 |
| Linn | 1,603 | 47.51% | 1,633 | 48.40% | 128 | 3.79% | 10 | 0.30% | -30 | -0.89% | 3,374 |
| Malheur | 330 | 49.40% | 303 | 45.36% | 14 | 2.10% | 0 | 0.00% | 27 | 4.04% | 668 (Note: 21 scattering votes) |
| Marion | 2,235 | 54.08% | 1,567 | 37.91% | 329 | 7.96% | 0 | 0.00% | 668 | 16.16% | 4,133 (Note: 2 scattering votes) |
| Morrow | 598 | 53.44% | 479 | 42.81% | 35 | 3.13% | 7 | 0.63% | 119 | 10.63% | 1,119 |
| Multnomah | 6,250 | 59.83% | 3,996 | 38.25% | 125 | 1.20% | 65 | 0.62% | 2,254 | 21.58% | 10,447 (Note: 11 scattering votes) |
| Polk | 785 | 49.53% | 729 | 45.99% | 71 | 4.48% | 0 | 0.00% | 56 | 3.53% | 1,585 |
| Tillamook | 393 | 62.28% | 220 | 34.87% | 18 | 2.85% | 0 | 0.00% | 173 | 27.42% | 631 |
| Umatilla | 1,523 | 47.52% | 1,551 | 48.39% | 102 | 3.18% | 29 | 0.90% | -28 | -0.87% | 3,205 |
| Union | 1,303 | 51.10% | 1,223 | 47.96% | 24 | 0.94% | 0 | 0.00% | 80 | 3.14% | 2,550 |
| Wallowa | 455 | 58.71% | 306 | 39.48% | 14 | 1.81% | 0 | 0.00% | 149 | 19.23% | 775 |
| Wasco | 1,595 | 58.53% | 1,054 | 38.68% | 72 | 2.64% | 4 | 0.15% | 541 | 19.85% | 2,725 |
| Washington | 1,248 | 57.91% | 838 | 38.89% | 66 | 3.06% | 3 | 0.14% | 410 | 19.03% | 2,155 |
| Yamhill | 1,289 | 54.16% | 994 | 41.76% | 79 | 3.32% | 9 | 0.38% | 295 | 12.39% | 2,380 (Note: 9 scattering votes) |
| Totals | 33,291 | 53.78% | 26,522 | 42.84% | 1,677 | 2.71% | 363 | 0.59% | 6,769 | 10.93% | 61,906 |

== See also ==
- United States presidential elections in Oregon
