= 2016 United States presidential election in Oregon =

- November 8, 2016
- Turnout: 70.26% (eligible voters) ▲

Nominee	Hillary Clinton	Donald Trump
Party	Democratic	Republican
Home state	New York	New York
Running mate	Tim Kaine	Mike Pence
Electoral vote	7	0
Popular vote	1,002,106	782,403
Percentage	50.07%	39.09%

Clinton
40–50%
50–60%
60–70%
70–80%
80–90%
90–100%
Trump
40–50%
50–60%
60–70%
70–80%
80–90%
90–100%
Tie/No Data
President before election
Barack Obama
Democratic
Elected President
Donald Trump
Republican

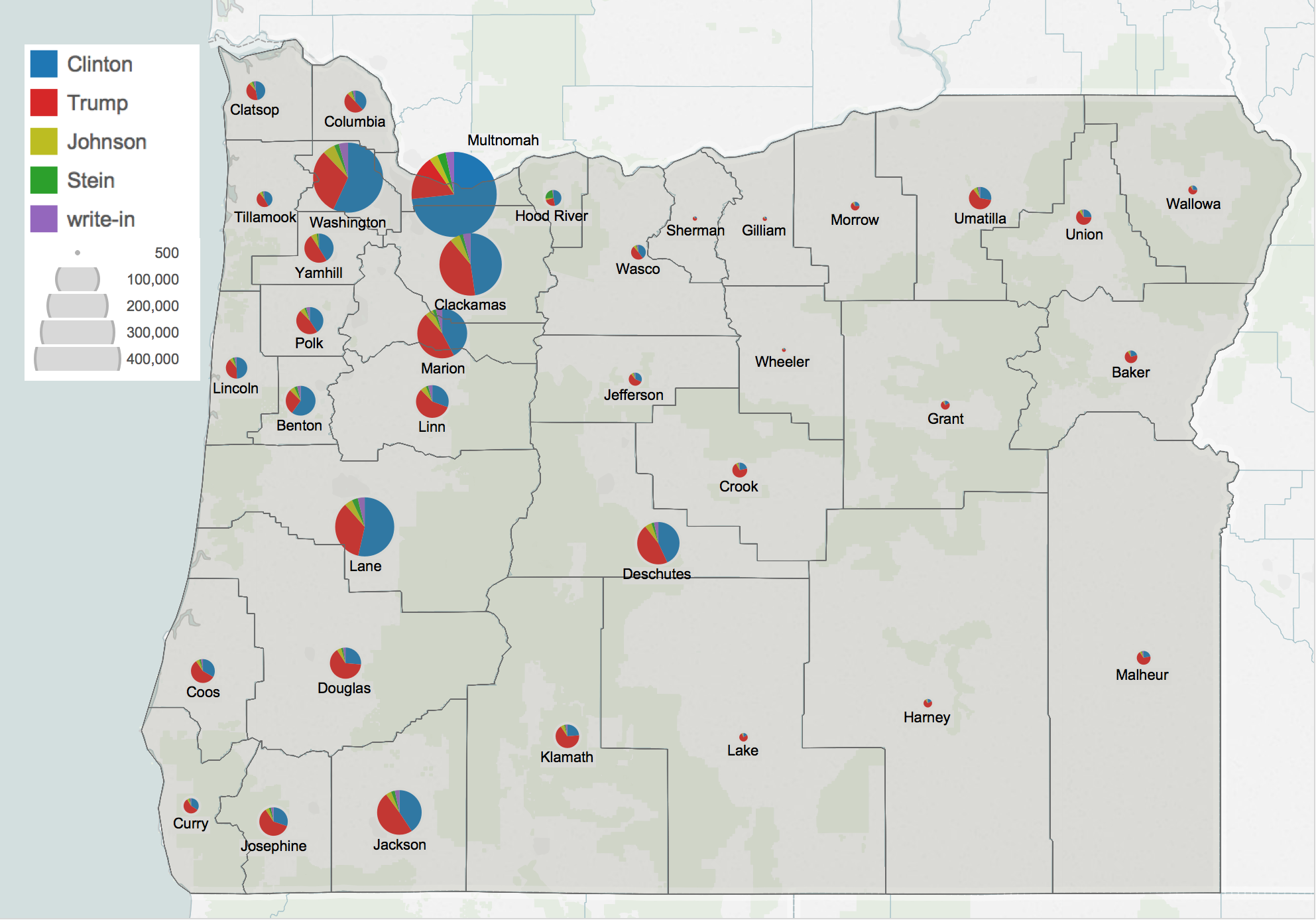
Results by county with size showing number of votes

Treemap of the popular vote by county

The 2016 United States presidential election in Oregon was held on Tuesday, November 8, 2016, as part of the 2016 United States presidential election in which all 50 states plus the District of Columbia participated. Oregon voters chose electors to represent them in the Electoral College via a popular vote, pitting the Republican Party's nominee, businessman Donald Trump, and running mate Indiana Governor Mike Pence against Democratic Party nominee, former Secretary of State Hillary Clinton, and her running mate Virginia Senator Tim Kaine. Oregon has seven electoral votes in the Electoral College.

The Democratic presidential candidate has won Oregon in every election since 1988. Clinton continued this tradition, carrying the state with 50% of the vote, a slightly reduced margin from Barack Obama in 2012, but with a slightly higher raw vote total, becoming only the second presidential candidate to win more than a million votes in the process. Trump received 39% of the vote, a smaller proportion of the vote compared to that of Mitt Romney in 2012. However, he did achieve a notable feat in carrying Columbia County, becoming the first Republican to do so since Herbert Hoover in 1928. In addition, this was also the first presidential election since 1976 in which Clackamas County backed the losing candidate, with Trump becoming the first Republican ever to win the White House without carrying the county.

== Primaries and Caucuses ==
Oregon held its presidential primaries on May 17, 2016.

=== Primary elections ===
==== Democratic primary ====
Two candidates appeared on the Democratic presidential primary ballot:

- Bernie Sanders
- Hillary Clinton

The 74 delegates from Oregon were allocated in this way: 41 delegates were allocated based on the popular vote in each congressional district with district 2 split (district 2 was split because of its size with district 2a including the northern part of the district and 2b containing the southern part of the district). Another 20 delegates were allocated proportionally based on the statewide popular vote. The state also had 13 super delegates.

Oregon Democratic primary, May 17, 2016
Candidate	Popular vote		Estimated delegates		
Candidate	Count	Percentage	Pledged	Unpledged	Total
Bernie Sanders	360,829	56.24%	36	3	39
Hillary Clinton	269,846	42.06%	25	7	32
Misc.	10,920	1.70%	0	0	0
(available)	—N/a		0	3	3
Total	641,595	100%	61	13	74

==== Republican primary ====
Six candidates appeared on the Republican presidential primary ballot:

- Jeb Bush (withdrawn)
- Ben Carson (withdrawn)
- Ted Cruz (withdrawn)
- John Kasich (withdrawn)
- Marco Rubio (withdrawn)
- Donald Trump

The 28 delegates from Oregon were allocated proportionally based on the statewide popular vote.

Oregon Republican primary, May 17, 2016
Candidate	Votes	Percentage	Actual delegate count		
Candidate	Votes	Percentage	Bound	Unbound	Total
Donald Trump	252,748	64.16%	18	0	18
Ted Cruz (withdrawn)	65,513	16.63%	5	0	5
John Kasich (withdrawn)	62,248	15.80%	5	0	5
Write-in	13,411	3.40%	0	0	0
Unprojected delegates:			0	0	0
Total:	393,920	100.00%	28	0	28
Source: The Green Papers

==== Green primary ====
This state's Green Party held its presidential preference vote on May 21.

On May 22, it was announced that Jill Stein had won the preference vote.

Oregon Green Party presidential convention, April 17, 2016
Candidate	Votes	Percentage	National delegates
Jill Stein	-	-	6
Sedinam Kinamo Christin Moyowasifza Curry	-	-	1
Uncommitted	-	-	1
Total	-	-	8

==== Libertarian primary ====
The Oregon primary was completed on May 27, 2016, the last day to receive mail-in ballots.

Oregon Libertarian presidential primary, May 27, 2016
Candidate	Votes	Percentage
Gary Johnson	422	57%
John McAfee	105	14%
Merry Susan Nehls	34	5%
Austin Petersen (write-in)	25	3%
Darryl Perry	21	3%
Keenan Dunham	18	2%
Derrick Michael Reid	10	1%
Rhett Smith	6	1%
NOTA (write-in)	2	0%
Other write-ins	91	12%
Total	742	100%

==== Independent Party of Oregon primary ====
The Independent Party held a primary election on July 18. The party's ballot included Bernie Sanders (D), Hillary Clinton (D), Donald Trump (R), Ted Cruz (R), John Kasich (R), Gary Johnson (L), Jill Stein (G) and a "none of these candidates" choice. Bernie Sanders won the primary election with 31.5% of the vote, narrowly defeating Donald Trump's 30.08%. Hillary Clinton came in third, with 24.02% of the vote. Members were allowed to select one or more candidates.

Independent Party Presidential Ballot, July 18, 2016
Candidate	Party	Percentage
Bernie Sanders	Democrat	31.5%
Donald Trump	Republican	30.08%
Hillary Clinton	Democrat	24.02%
None of the above	N/A	9.17%
Gary Johnson	Libertarian	16.07%
Jill Stein	Green	9.49%
Ted Cruz	Republican	5.68%
John Kasich	Republican	12.27%

== General election ==
=== Predictions ===
Source	Ranking	As of
Los Angeles Times	Safe D	November 6, 2016
CNN	Safe D	November 4, 2016
Cook Political Report	Safe D	November 7, 2016
Electoral-vote.com	Safe D	November 8, 2016
Rothenberg Political Report	Safe D	November 7, 2016
Sabato's Crystal Ball	Safe D	November 7, 2016
RealClearPolitics	Lean D	November 8, 2016
Fox News	Safe D	November 7, 2016

=== Voting history ===
Besides Lyndon Johnson's landslide victory in 1964, the Republican party's candidate won Oregon in every year from 1948 through 1984. Since then, however, the Democratic candidate has carried the state in every election, including a narrow victory in the 2000 election. The last statewide election won by a Republican candidate was in the 2002 Senate election, all statewide elected officials as of election day were Democrats, and Barack Obama defeated Mitt Romney by 12.09% in the 2012 election. Generally, Eastern Oregon is more conservative, while Western Oregon is more liberal.

=== Polling ===
Democrat Hillary Clinton won every pre-election poll conducted in the state except one and led by margins of 7 to 13 points in most polls. The average of the final 3 polls showed Hillary Clinton leading Trump 44% to 36%.

=== Results ===
2016 U.S. presidential election in Oregon
Party	Candidate	Votes	%
Democratic	Hillary Clinton	1,002,106	50.07%
Republican	Donald Trump	782,403	39.09%
Libertarian	Gary Johnson	94,231	4.71%
Pacific Green Party/Progressive	Jill Stein	50,002	2.50%
	write-ins	72,594	3.63%
Total votes		2,001,336	100.00%

Hillary Clinton carried the state, lengthening the Democratic streak in Oregon to eight straight contests.

==== By county ====
County	Hillary Clinton Democratic		Donald Trump Republican		Various candidates Other parties		Margin		Total votes cast
County	#	%	#	%	#	%	#	%	Total votes cast
Baker	1,797	20.47%	6,218	70.83%	764	8.70%	-4,421	-50.36%	8,779
Benton	29,193	59.88%	13,445	27.58%	6,115	12.54%	15,748	32.30%	48,753
Clackamas	102,095	47.70%	88,392	41.30%	23,552	11.00%	20,703	6.40%	214,039
Clatsop	9,252	47.05%	8,138	41.39%	2,274	11.56%	1,114	5.66%	19,664
Columbia	10,167	38.20%	13,217	49.65%	3,234	12.15%	-3,050	-11.45%	26,618
Coos	10,448	33.37%	17,865	57.05%	3,000	9.58%	-7,417	-23.68%	31,313
Crook	2,637	21.66%	8,511	69.92%	1,024	8.42%	-5,874	-48.26%	12,172
Curry	4,300	34.10%	7,212	57.19%	1,099	8.71%	-2,912	-23.09%	12,611
Deschutes	42,444	43.07%	45,692	46.36%	10,421	10.57%	-3,248	-3.29%	98,557
Douglas	14,096	26.34%	34,582	64.61%	4,843	9.05%	-20,486	-38.27%	53,521
Gilliam	239	23.45%	671	65.85%	109	10.70%	-432	-42.40%	1,019
Grant	739	17.03%	3,210	73.96%	391	9.01%	-2,471	-56.93%	4,340
Harney	683	17.19%	2,912	73.28%	379	9.53%	-2,229	-56.09%	3,974
Hood River	6,510	59.67%	3,272	29.99%	1,128	10.34%	3,238	29.68%	10,910
Jackson	44,447	40.66%	53,870	49.27%	11,010	10.07%	-9,423	-8.61%	109,327
Jefferson	2,980	31.50%	5,483	57.97%	996	10.53%	-2,503	-26.47%	9,459
Josephine	13,453	30.19%	26,923	60.42%	4,184	9.39%	-13,470	-30.23%	44,560
Klamath	7,210	23.63%	20,435	66.98%	2,862	9.39%	-13,225	-43.35%	30,507
Lake	639	16.26%	3,022	76.90%	269	6.84%	-2,383	-60.64%	3,930
Lane	102,753	53.53%	67,141	34.98%	22,056	11.49%	35,612	18.55%	191,950
Lincoln	12,501	49.50%	10,039	39.75%	2,716	10.75%	2,462	9.75%	25,256
Linn	17,995	30.65%	33,488	57.03%	7,236	12.32%	-15,493	-26.38%	58,719
Malheur	2,246	21.52%	7,194	68.94%	995	9.54%	-4,948	-47.42%	10,435
Marion	57,788	42.23%	63,377	46.31%	15,675	11.46%	-5,589	-4.08%	136,840
Morrow	1,017	24.41%	2,721	65.30%	429	10.29%	-1,704	-40.89%	4,167
Multnomah	292,561	73.30%	67,954	17.03%	38,588	9.67%	224,607	56.27%	399,103
Polk	16,420	40.75%	18,940	47.00%	4,935	12.25%	-2,520	-6.25%	40,295
Sherman	202	19.86%	732	71.98%	83	8.16%	-530	-52.12%	1,017
Tillamook	5,768	41.79%	6,538	47.37%	1,497	10.84%	-770	-5.58%	13,803
Umatilla	7,673	27.80%	17,059	61.81%	2,865	10.39%	-9,386	-34.01%	27,597
Union	3,249	25.05%	8,431	65.01%	1,288	9.94%	-5,182	-39.96%	12,968
Wallowa	1,116	25.56%	2,848	65.23%	402	9.21%	-1,732	-39.67%	4,366
Wasco	4,781	39.96%	5,833	48.75%	1,350	11.29%	-1,052	-8.79%	11,964
Washington	153,251	56.92%	83,197	30.90%	32,784	12.18%	70,054	26.02%	269,232
Wheeler	155	18.95%	591	72.25%	72	8.80%	-436	-53.30%	818
Yamhill	19,301	39.59%	23,250	47.69%	6,202	12.72%	-3,949	-8.10%	48,753
Total	1,002,106	50.07%	782,403	39.09%	216,827	10.84%	219,703	10.98%	2,001,336

Counties that flipped from Democratic to Republican

- Columbia (largest city: St. Helens)
- Tillamook (largest city: Tillamook)

==== By congressional district ====
Clinton won four of five congressional districts.

District	Clinton	Trump	Representative
1st	55%	33%	Suzanne Bonamici
2nd	35%	55%	Greg Walden
3rd	68%	22%	Earl Blumenauer
4th	45%	44%	Peter DeFazio
5th	46%	42%	Kurt Schrader

== See also ==
- United States presidential elections in Oregon
- First presidency of Donald Trump
- 2016 Democratic Party presidential debates and forums
- 2016 Democratic Party presidential primaries
- 2016 Republican Party presidential debates and forums
- 2016 Republican Party presidential primaries
