= 2020 United States presidential election in Oregon =

- November 3, 2020
- Turnout: 81.97% (of registered voters) ▲

Nominee	Joe Biden	Donald Trump
Party	Democratic	Republican
Alliance	Independent Party	-
Home state	Delaware	Florida
Running mate	Kamala Harris	Mike Pence
Electoral vote	7	0
Popular vote	1,340,383	958,448
Percentage	56.45%	40.37%

Biden
40–50%
50–60%
60–70%
70–80%
80–90%
90–100%
Trump
40–50%
50–60%
60–70%
70–80%
80–90%
90–100%
Tie/No Data
President before election
Donald Trump
Republican
Elected President
Joe Biden
Democratic

The 2020 United States presidential election in Oregon was held on Tuesday, November 3, 2020, as part of the 2020 United States presidential election in which all 50 states plus the District of Columbia participated. Oregon voters chose electors to represent them in the Electoral College via a popular vote, pitting the Republican Party's nominee, President Donald Trump, and running mate Vice President Mike Pence against Democratic Party nominee, former Vice President Joe Biden, and his running mate California Senator Kamala Harris. Oregon has seven electoral votes in the Electoral College.

Prior to the election, Oregon was considered to be a state Biden would win or a safe blue state. Biden won 56.45% of the vote to 40.37% for Trump. Biden received Oregon's seven electoral votes in the Electoral College. The state certified its election results on December 3.

Biden won Oregon by 16.09%, an increase from Hillary Clinton's 11% victory margin in 2016. No Republican presidential candidate has won Oregon since Ronald Reagan of neighboring California in 1984. Biden flipped two counties Trump won in 2016: Marion County, home to the state capital of Salem; and Deschutes County, anchored by fast-growing Bend. This marked the first time since 1964 that a Democrat won an outright majority in Deschutes County, although Democratic presidential nominees in 1976 and 1992 had carried the county with pluralities.

Biden was the first Democrat since Woodrow Wilson in 1916 to win the presidency without carrying Columbia County and Tillamook County. Tillamook and Columbia counties were among a fraction of the more than 3,000 counties in the U.S. to vote twice for Barack Obama (in 2008 and 2012) and twice for Trump (in 2016 and 2020). Biden also made history as the highest vote earner in Oregon history, with 1,340,383 votes, and Biden was able to achieve stronger swings leftward in 28 of Oregon's 36 counties than Hillary Clinton in 2016. Per exit polls by the Associated Press, 33% of voters were secular and supported Biden by 80%.

== Primary elections ==
The Oregon primary elections were held on Tuesday, May 19, 2020.

=== Republican primary ===
Donald Trump ran unopposed in Oregon, receiving the state's 28 delegates to the Republican National Convention

2020 Oregon Republican presidential primary
Candidate	Votes	%	Delegates
Donald Trump (incumbent)	363,785	93.70	28
Write-ins	24,461	6.30	0
Total	388,246	100.00	28

=== Democratic primary ===
Though all Democrats but Joe Biden had withdrawn from the national race by the Oregon primary, four remained on the ballot. Biden won just under two-thirds of the vote. Bernie Sanders received just over 20% of the vote. Oregon's 71 delegates were allocated with 46 to Biden and 15 to Sanders.

2020 Oregon Democratic presidential primary
Candidate	Votes	%	Delegates
Joe Biden	408,315	65.99	46
Bernie Sanders (withdrawn)	127,345	20.58	15
Elizabeth Warren (withdrawn)	59,355	9.59	
Tulsi Gabbard (withdrawn)	10,717	1.73	
Write-in votes	12,979	2.10	
Total	618,711	100%	61

=== Independent Party of Oregon primary ===
The Independent Party of Oregon cross-nominated Joe Biden after an online nonpartisan blanket primary.

Candidate	Votes	%
Joe Biden	1,661	46.7
Donald Trump	1,389	39.1
Bernie Sanders	1,227	34.5
Total	4,277	100.00

Candidate	Votes	%
Joe Biden	392	55.13
Donald Trump	280	39.38

=== Pacific Green Party primary ===
Howie Hawkins won the Oregon Green Party primary.

== General election ==
=== Final predictions ===
Source	Ranking
The Cook Political Report	Solid D
Inside Elections	Solid D
Sabato's Crystal Ball	Safe D
Politico	Likely D
RCP	Lean D
Niskanen	Safe D
CNN	Solid D
The Economist	Safe D
CBS News	Likely D
270towin	Safe D
ABC News	Solid D
NPR	Likely D
NBC News	Likely D
538	Solid D

=== Polling ===
View source data.

==== Polls ====
Aggregate polls

Source of poll aggregation	Dates administered	Dates updated	Joe Biden Democratic	Donald Trump Republican	Other/ Undecided (Note: Calculated by taking the difference of 100% and all other candidates combined.)	Margin
270 to Win	September 26 – October 17, 2020	October 20, 2020	58.0%	38.5%	3.5%	Biden +19.5
FiveThirtyEight	until November 2, 2020	November 3, 2020	58.7%	37.4%	3.9%	Biden +21.3
Average			58.4%	38.0%	3.7%	Biden +20.4

Polls

Poll source	Date(s) administered	Sample size (Note: Key: A – all adults RV – registered voters LV – likely voters V – unclear)	Margin of error	Donald Trump Republican	Joe Biden Democratic	Jo Jorgensen Libertarian	Howie Hawkins Pacific Green	Other	Undecided
SurveyMonkey/Axios	Oct 20 – Nov 2, 2020	3,543 (LV)	± 2.5%	39% (Note: Overlapping sample with the previous SurveyMonkey/Axios poll, but more information available regarding sample size)	59%	–	–	–	–
Swayable	Oct 23 – Nov 1, 2020	324 (LV)	± 7.3%	37%	60%	1%	1%	–	–
SurveyMonkey/Axios	Oct 1–28, 2020	5,422 (LV)	–	38%	61%	–	–	–	–
SurveyMonkey/Axios	Sep 1–30, 2020	2,109 (LV)	–	38%	61%	–	–	–	2%
Civiqs/Daily Kos	Sep 26–29, 2020	944 (LV)	± 3.5%	39%	56%	–	–	3% (Note: "Someone else" with 3%)	2%
DHM Research	Sep 3–8, 2020	502 (LV)	± 4%	39%	51%	–	–	6% (Note: "Someone else" with 6%)	4%
SurveyMonkey/Axios	Aug 1–31, 2020	1,648 (LV)	–	38%	60%	–	–	–	2%
SurveyMonkey/Axios	Jul 1–31, 2020	1,890 (LV)	–	38%	61%	–	–	–	1%
SurveyMonkey/Axios	Jun 8–30, 2020	872 (LV)	–	39%	59%	–	–	–	2%

=== Results ===
2020 United States presidential election in Oregon
Party	Candidate	Votes	%	±%
Democratic	Joe Biden Kamala Harris	1,340,383	56.45%	+6.38%
Republican	Donald Trump Mike Pence	958,448	40.37%	+1.28%
Libertarian	Jo Jorgensen Spike Cohen	41,582	1.75%	−2.96%
Pacific Green	Howie Hawkins Angela Walker	11,831	0.50%	−2.00%
Progressive	Dario Hunter Dawn Neptune Adams	4,988	0.21%	N/A
Write-in		17,089	0.72%	−2.91%
Total votes		2,374,321	100.00%	N/A

==== By county ====
County	Joe Biden Democratic		Donald Trump Republican		Various candidates Other parties		Margin		Total votes cast
County	#	%	#	%	#	%	#	%	Total votes cast
Baker	2,346	23.62%	7,352	74.02%	234	2.36%	-5,006	-50.40%	9,932
Benton	35,827	67.86%	14,878	28.18%	2,094	3.97%	20,949	39.68%	52,799
Clackamas	139,043	53.96%	110,509	42.89%	8,127	3.15%	28,534	11.07%	257,679
Clatsop	12,916	54.02%	10,218	42.74%	776	3.25%	2,698	11.28%	23,910
Columbia	13,835	42.94%	17,150	53.23%	1,236	3.84%	-3,315	-10.29%	32,221
Coos	14,243	38.42%	21,829	58.88%	1,003	2.71%	-7,586	-20.46%	37,075
Crook	3,801	24.61%	11,287	73.06%	360	2.33%	-7,486	-48.46%	15,448
Curry	6,058	40.59%	8,484	56.84%	383	2.57%	-2,426	-16.25%	14,925
Deschutes	65,962	52.67%	55,646	44.43%	3,626	2.90%	10,316	8.24%	125,234
Douglas	19,160	29.78%	43,298	67.29%	1,891	2.94%	-24,138	-37.51%	64,349
Gilliam	324	27.50%	834	70.80%	20	1.70%	-510	-43.29%	1,178
Grant	929	20.21%	3,545	77.13%	122	2.65%	-2,616	-56.92%	4,596
Harney	894	19.95%	3,475	77.55%	112	2.50%	-2,581	-57.60%	4,481
Hood River	8,764	66.95%	3,955	30.21%	371	2.83%	4,809	36.74%	13,090
Jackson	59,478	46.77%	63,869	50.23%	3,818	3.00%	-4,391	-3.45%	127,165
Jefferson	4,393	36.88%	7,189	60.35%	331	2.78%	-2,796	-23.47%	11,913
Josephine	18,451	35.73%	31,751	61.48%	1,439	2.79%	-13,300	-25.75%	51,641
Klamath	10,388	28.29%	25,308	68.91%	1,030	2.80%	-14,920	-40.63%	36,726
Lake	792	18.15%	3,470	79.53%	101	2.31%	-2,678	-61.38%	4,363
Lane	134,366	60.46%	80,336	36.15%	7,551	3.40%	54,030	24.31%	222,253
Lincoln	17,385	56.58%	12,460	40.55%	881	2.87%	4,925	16.03%	30,726
Linn	26,512	36.50%	43,486	59.87%	2,642	3.64%	-16,974	-23.37%	72,640
Malheur	3,260	27.62%	8,187	69.36%	357	3.02%	-4,927	-41.74%	11,804
Marion	80,872	48.86%	79,002	47.73%	5,660	3.42%	1,870	1.13%	165,534
Morrow	1,371	26.79%	3,586	70.07%	161	3.15%	-2,215	-43.28%	5,118
Multnomah	367,249	79.21%	82,995	17.90%	13,415	2.89%	284,254	61.31%	463,659
Polk	22,917	47.46%	23,732	49.14%	1,642	3.40%	-815	-1.69%	48,291
Sherman	260	21.52%	921	76.24%	27	2.24%	-661	-54.72%	1,208
Tillamook	8,066	47.76%	8,354	49.47%	468	2.77%	-288	-1.71%	16,888
Umatilla	10,707	32.41%	21,270	64.38%	1,061	3.21%	-10,563	-31.97%	33,038
Union	4,254	28.47%	10,298	68.91%	392	2.62%	-6,044	-40.44%	14,944
Wallowa	1,625	31.56%	3,404	66.11%	120	2.33%	-1,779	-34.55%	5,149
Wasco	6,604	46.74%	7,035	49.79%	491	3.47%	-431	-3.05%	14,130
Washington	209,940	65.54%	99,073	30.93%	11,313	3.53%	110,867	34.61%	320,326
Wheeler	217	22.49%	711	73.68%	37	3.83%	-494	-51.19%	965
Yamhill	27,174	46.12%	29,551	50.15%	2,198	3.73%	-2,377	-4.03%	58,923
Totals	1,340,383	56.45%	958,448	40.37%	75,490	3.18%	381,935	16.09%	2,374,321

Counties that flipped from Republican to Democratic

- Deschutes (largest city: Bend)
- Marion (largest city: Salem)

==== By congressional district ====
Biden won four out of five congressional districts in Oregon.

District	Trump	Biden	Representative
1st	33.8%	62.7%	Suzanne Bonamici
2nd	55.3%	41.8%	Cliff Bentz
3rd	23.3%	73.8%	Earl Blumenauer
4th	46.4%	50.3%	Peter DeFazio
5th	43.6%	53.2%	Kurt Schrader

== Analysis ==
=== Edison exit polls ===
2020 presidential election in Oregon by demographic subgroup (Edison exit polling)
Demographic subgroup	Biden	Trump	% of total vote
Total vote	56.45	40.37	100
Ideology
Liberals	96	4	33
Moderates	66	30	37
Conservatives	8	92	30
Party
Democrats	98	2	36
Republicans	7	93	24
Independents	52	43	41
Gender
Men	51	45	50
Women	63	35	50
Race/ethnicity
White	58	39	85
Non-white	–	–	15
Age
18–29 years old	–	–	17
30–44 years old	62	34	24
45–64 years old	52	48	35
65 and older	54	44	24
Sexual orientation
LGBT	–	–	8
Not LGBT	55	42	92
Education
High school or less	38	62	24
Some college education	57	37	34
Associate degree	57	41	12
Bachelor's degree	67	30	17
Postgraduate degree	78	18	13
Region
Multnomah County	–	–	20
Portland suburbs	63	35	26
Willamette/Northwest	51	45	29
East/South	39	57	25
Area type
Urban	75	23	32
Suburban	52	44	50
Rural	37	58	18
Family's financial situation today
Better than four years ago	27	71	41
Worse than four years ago	84	9	17
About the same	73	24	42

== See also ==
- United States presidential elections in Oregon
- Presidency of Joe Biden
- 2020 United States presidential election
- 2020 Democratic Party presidential primaries
- 2020 Republican Party presidential primaries
- 2020 United States elections
