= 1980 United States presidential election in Oregon =

- November 4, 1980

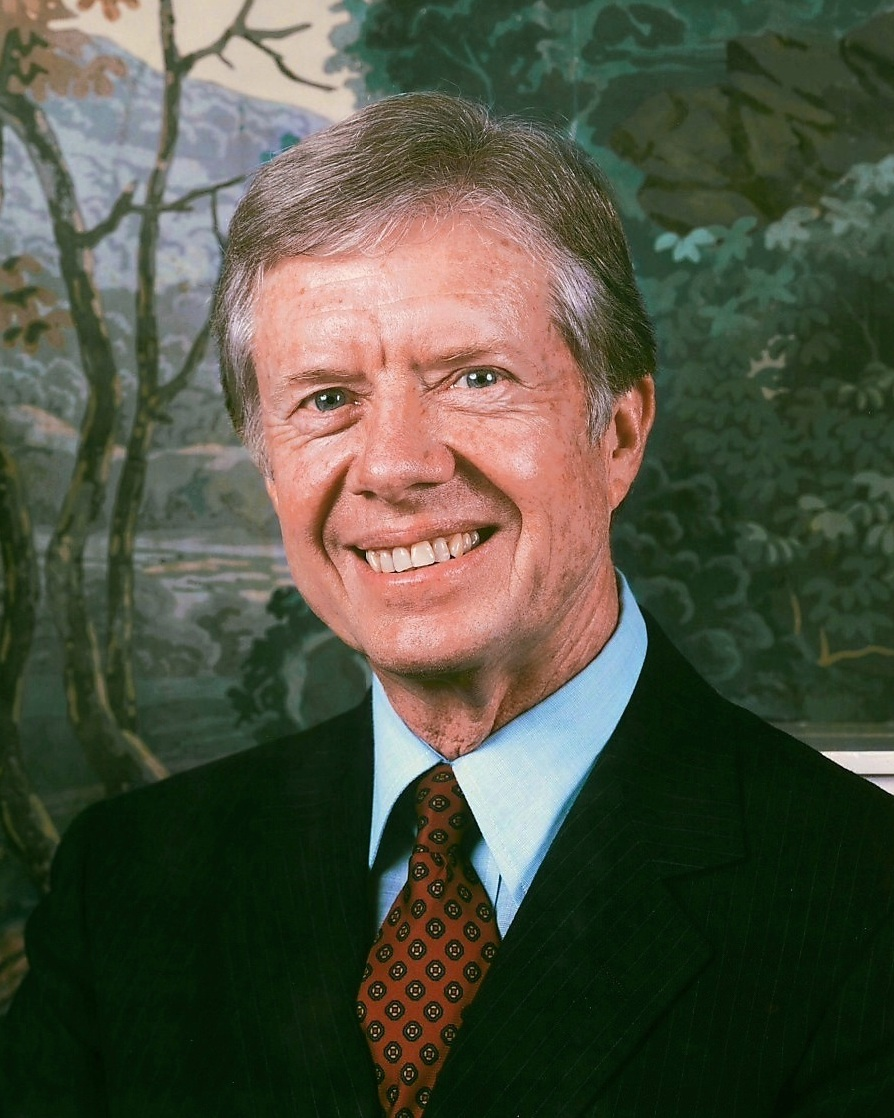

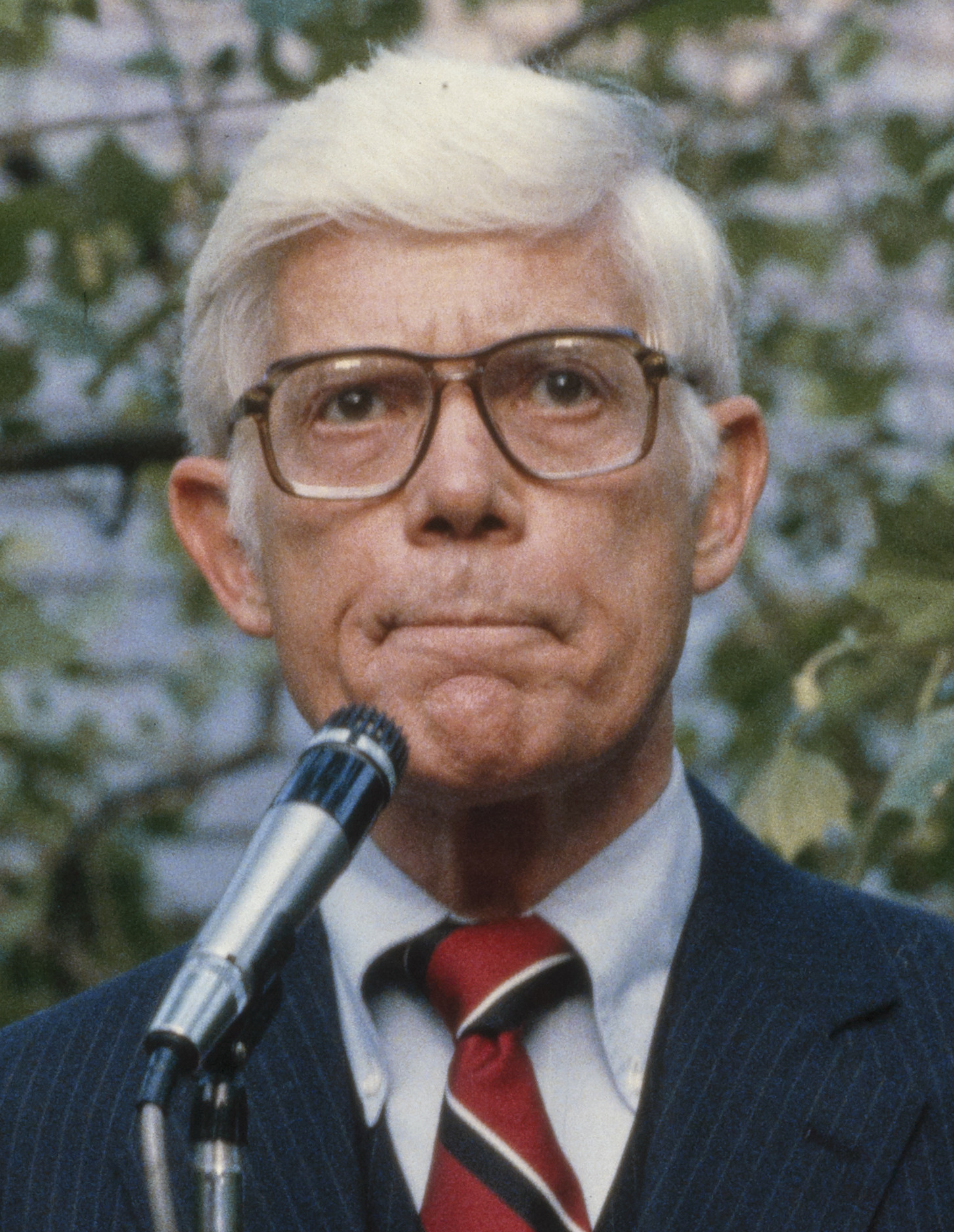
Nominee	Ronald Reagan	Jimmy Carter	John B. Anderson
Party	Republican	Democratic	Independent
Home state	California	Georgia	Illinois
Running mate	George H. W. Bush	Walter Mondale	Patrick Lucey
Electoral vote	6	0	0
Popular vote	571,044	456,890	112,389
Percentage	48.33%	38.67%	9.51%
County results
Reagan
40–50%
50–60%
60–70%
Carter
40–50%
President before election
Jimmy Carter
Democratic
Elected President
Ronald Reagan
Republican

The 1980 United States presidential election in Oregon took place on November 4, 1980. All fifty states and The District of Columbia were part of the 1980 United States presidential election. Voters chose six electors to the Electoral College, who voted for president and vice president.

Oregon had voted in 1976 for incumbent President Gerald Ford over challenger Carter in the previous election by an extremely narrow margin of just 1,713 votes, but had been George McGovern’s sixth-strongest state during his 1972 2,900-plus-county landslide loss.

Both Carter and Reagan won the Democratic and Republican presidential primaries held during the third week of May 1980. In August early in Carter's campaign, he targeted Oregon as a state he might win despite having supported only one Democrat since 1944, on the basis that independent candidate and Reagan primary rival John B. Anderson would split the GOP vote.

The last week of September saw all three leading candidates visit Oregon, and at the end of the month Reagan was shown as ahead by around five percentage points, after having been in the lead in Oregon ever since the first polls were taken in mid-September.

October saw Vice-President Walter Mondale doing extensive campaigning in the state, and with polls showing Anderson winning over fifteen percent of the state's ballots and strong support for the Equal Rights Amendment opposed by Reagan, the Democrats possessed substantial hope in the state. By the last week of October, Carter's spokesmen were confident they could crack a state whose loss four years previously they attributed to the presence of Eugene McCarthy on the ballot, but in the days before the poll sample votes swung towards Reagan again.

Oregon was ultimately won by former California Governor Ronald Reagan (R) by 9.66%. This made the state 0.06% to the left of the nation at-large and the closest to the national popular vote results. Reagan dominated in the conservative, populist eastern interior and Rogue Valley, where he won a majority in every county, and Carter, despite carrying four counties, did not win a majority in any due to a strong vote west of the Cascades for Anderson, who reached double figures in all Willamette Valley counties except Columbia and Linn. This was the first time the Republicans had carried Coos County since Dwight D. Eisenhower in 1952. As of the 2020 presidential election, this is the last election in which Lane County voted for a Republican presidential candidate.

== Primaries ==
1980 Democratic Primary
Candidate	Votes	Delegates
Jimmy Carter (incumbent)	208,693	26
Ted Kennedy	114,651	14
Jerry Brown	34,409	0
Others	10,569	0
Totals	368,322	40

1980 Republican Primary
Candidate	Votes	Delegates
Ronald Reagan	170,449	17
George H.W. Bush	109,210	11
John Anderson	32,118	0
Others	2,324	0
Totals	314,101	31

== Results ==
Electoral results
Presidential candidate	Party	Home state	Popular vote		Electoral vote	Running mate		
Presidential candidate	Party	Home state	Count	Percentage	Electoral vote	Vice-presidential candidate	Home state	Electoral vote
Ronald Reagan	Republican	California	571,044	48.33%	6	George H.W. Bush	Texas	6
Jimmy Carter (incumbent)	Democratic	Georgia	456,890	38.67%	0	Walter Mondale (incumbent)	Minnesota	0
John B. Anderson	Independent	Illinois	112,389	9.51%	0	Patrick Lucey	Wisconsin	0
Ed Clark	Libertarian	California	25,838	2.19%	0	David Koch	New York	0
Barry Commoner	Independent	New York	13,642	1.15%	0	LaDonna Harris	Oklahoma	0
Write-ins	—	—	1,713	0.14%	0	—	—	0
Total			1,181,516	100%	7			7
Needed to win					270			270

=== Results by county ===
County	Ronald Reagan Republican		Jimmy Carter Democratic		John B. Anderson Independent		Ed Clark Libertarian		Barry Commoner Independent		Various candidates Write-ins		Margin		Total votes cast
County	#	%	#	%	#	%	#	%	#	%	#	%	#	%	Total votes cast
Baker	4,747	59.24%	2,515	31.39%	487	6.08%	208	2.60%	56	0.70%			2,232	27.85%	8,013
Benton	14,982	43.42%	13,150	38.11%	4,950	14.34%	709	2.05%	648	1.88%	68	0.20%	1,832	5.31%	34,507
Clackamas	54,111	49.42%	40,462	36.96%	11,386	10.40%	2,676	2.44%	733	0.67%	115	0.11%	13,649	12.46%	109,483
Clatsop	6,124	40.94%	6,482	43.33%	1,854	12.39%	303	2.02%	182	1.22%	24	0.16%	-358	-2.39%	14,959
Columbia	6,623	42.72%	7,124	45.95%	1,158	7.47%	486	3.13%	77	0.50%	37	0.24%	-501	-3.23%	15,505
Coos	13,041	46.28%	11,817	41.94%	2,428	8.62%	636	2.26%	218	0.77%	36	0.13%	1,224	4.34%	28,176
Crook	3,113	53.10%	2,162	36.88%	435	7.42%	109	1.86%	30	0.51%	13	0.22%	951	16.22%	5,862
Curry	4,910	57.85%	2,656	31.29%	652	7.68%	185	2.18%	74	0.87%	11	0.13%	2,254	26.56%	8,488
Deschutes	15,186	52.89%	9,641	33.57%	2,909	10.13%	691	2.41%	258	0.90%	30	0.10%	5,545	19.32%	28,715
Douglas	23,101	58.46%	12,564	31.79%	2,529	6.40%	947	2.40%	330	0.84%	45	0.11%	10,537	26.67%	39,516
Gilliam	622	54.56%	394	34.56%	85	7.46%	28	2.46%	8	0.70%	3	0.26%	228	20.00%	1,140
Grant	2,519	60.16%	1,274	30.43%	273	6.52%	96	2.29%	25	0.60%			1,245	29.73%	4,187
Harney	2,313	61.11%	1,110	29.33%	255	6.74%	85	2.25%	18	0.48%	4	0.11%	1,203	31.78%	3,785
Hood River	3,450	48.65%	2,924	41.23%	530	7.47%	133	1.88%	53	0.75%	2	0.03%	526	7.42%	7,092
Jackson	32,879	55.97%	19,903	33.88%	4,019	6.84%	1,219	2.08%	624	1.06%	96	0.16%	12,976	22.09%	58,740
Jefferson	2,523	53.26%	1,654	34.92%	431	9.10%	95	2.01%	30	0.63%	4	0.08%	869	18.34%	4,737
Josephine	16,827	63.89%	7,116	27.02%	1,401	5.32%	718	2.73%	239	0.91%	35	0.13%	9,711	36.87%	26,336
Klamath	16,060	62.75%	7,371	28.80%	1,427	5.58%	598	2.34%	114	0.45%	22	0.09%	8,689	33.95%	25,592
Lake	2,234	60.56%	1,147	31.09%	201	5.45%	95	2.58%	12	0.33%			1,087	29.47%	3,689
Lane	54,750	43.59%	52,240	41.59%	12,076	9.61%	2,311	1.84%	4,024	3.20%	203	0.16%	2,510	2.00%	125,604
Lincoln	7,637	44.59%	7,009	40.92%	1,637	9.56%	559	3.26%	273	1.59%	12	0.07%	628	3.67%	17,127
Linn	18,943	52.19%	13,516	37.24%	2,823	7.78%	777	2.14%	189	0.52%	45	0.12%	5,427	14.95%	36,293
Malheur	7,705	67.80%	2,937	25.84%	472	4.15%	224	1.97%	20	0.18%	6	0.05%	4,768	41.96%	11,364
Marion	42,191	49.38%	32,134	37.61%	8,755	10.25%	1,677	1.96%	592	0.69%	100	0.12%	10,057	11.77%	85,449
Morrow	1,728	55.01%	1,077	34.29%	239	7.61%	86	2.74%	11	0.35%			651	20.72%	3,141
Multnomah	101,606	39.23%	120,487	46.53%	27,572	10.65%	5,320	2.05%	3,428	1.32%	555	0.21%	-18,881	-7.30%	258,968
Polk	10,006	48.74%	7,833	38.15%	2,026	9.87%	455	2.22%	173	0.84%	38	0.19%	2,173	10.59%	20,531
Sherman	677	57.86%	389	33.25%	62	5.30%	29	2.48%	10	0.85%	3	0.26%	288	24.61%	1,170
Tillamook	4,123	41.63%	4,521	45.65%	931	9.40%	212	2.14%	100	1.01%	16	0.16%	-398	-4.02%	9,903
Umatilla	12,950	57.78%	7,382	32.93%	1,531	6.83%	450	2.01%	80	0.36%	21	0.09%	5,568	24.85%	22,414
Union	6,514	57.79%	3,677	32.62%	763	6.77%	239	2.12%	71	0.63%	8	0.07%	2,837	25.17%	11,272
Wallowa	2,485	65.53%	995	26.24%	216	5.70%	68	1.79%	23	0.61%	5	0.13%	1,490	39.29%	3,792
Wasco	4,703	45.95%	4,336	42.36%	819	8.00%	245	2.39%	126	1.23%	6	0.06%	367	3.59%	10,235
Washington	57,165	51.34%	37,915	34.05%	13,076	11.74%	2,498	2.24%	578	0.52%	123	0.11%	19,250	17.29%	111,355
Wheeler	442	54.70%	282	34.90%	62	7.67%	13	1.61%	7	0.87%	2	0.25%	160	19.80%	808
Yamhill	12,054	51.15%	8,694	36.89%	1,919	8.14%	658	2.79%	218	0.92%	25	0.11%	3,360	14.26%	23,568
Totals	571,044	48.33%	456,890	38.67%	112,389	9.51%	25,838	2.19%	13,642	1.15%	1,713	0.14%	114,154	9.66%	1,181,516

==== Counties that flipped from Democratic to Republican ====
- Coos
- Crook
- Curry
- Deschutes
- Lane
- Lincoln
- Linn
- Morrow
- Wasco
- Wheeler

== See also ==
- United States presidential elections in Oregon
- Presidency of Ronald Reagan
