= Hemlock, Tillamook County, Oregon =

Unincorporated community in the state of Oregon, United States

Hemlock
- Unincorporated community
- Location within the state of Oregon Hemlock (the United States)
- Coordinates: 45°18′56″N 123°50′12″W
- Country: United States
- State: Oregon
- County: Tillamook
- Elevation: 210 ft (64 m)
- Time zone: UTC-8 (Pacific (PST))
  - Summer (DST): UTC-7 (PDT)
- GNIS feature ID: 1143472

Hemlock is an unincorporated community in Tillamook County, in the U.S. state of Oregon. It lies along U.S. Route 101 about 3 miles (5 km) north of Beaver. Beaver Creek, a tributary of the Nestucca River, flows through Hemlock.

According to Oregon Geographic Names, the community was named for the western hemlock tree, "which grows in great abundance in the Coast Range." The post office in Hemlock operated from 1906 to 1921.
