= 1968 United States presidential election in Oregon =

- November 5, 1968

| Nominee | Richard Nixon | Hubert Humphrey | George Wallace |
| Party | Republican | Democratic | Independent |
| Alliance | | | American Independent |
| Home state | New York (Note: Although he was born in California and he served as a U.S. senator from California, in 1968 Richard Nixon’s official state of residence was New York, because he moved there to practice law after his defeat in the 1962 California gubernatorial election. During his first term as president, Nixon re-established his residency in California. Consequently, most reliable reference books list Nixon's home state as New York in the 1968 election and his home state as California in the 1972 (and 1960) election.) | Minnesota | Alabama |
| Running mate | Spiro Agnew | Edmund Muskie | Curtis LeMay |
| Electoral vote | 6 | 0 | 0 |
| Popular vote | 408,433 | 358,866 | 49,683 |
| Percentage | 49.83% | 43.78% | 6.06% |
County results
Nixon
40–50%
50–60%
60–70%
Humphrey
40–50%
50–60%
President before election
Lyndon B. Johnson
Democratic
Elected President
Richard Nixon
Republican

The 1968 United States presidential election in Oregon took place on November 5, 1968, as part of the 1968 United States presidential election. Voters chose six representatives, or electors, to the Electoral College, who voted for president and vice president.

Oregon was won by former Vice President Richard Nixon (R–New York), with 49.83% of the popular vote, against Vice President Hubert Humphrey (D–Minnesota), with 43.78% of the popular vote. Independent candidate George Wallace finished with 6.06% of Oregon's popular vote, with Oregon showing Wallace’s worst performance in the continental Western states. As of 2024, this is the fifth and final time Oregon and neighboring Washington did not vote for the same presidential candidate.

Wallace did best in Eastern Oregon, along with Douglas and Josephine counties, primarily settled by people from the Ohio Valley/Border States. Wallace had little appeal in the primarily Yankee and German-settled Willamette Valley.

Nixon's victory was the first of five consecutive Republican victories in the state, as Oregon would not vote for a Democratic candidate again until Michael Dukakis in 1988, after which it has always gone Democratic.

== Results ==
1968 United States presidential election in Oregon
| Party | Candidate | Votes | % |
|---|---|---|---|
| Republican | Richard Nixon | 408,433 | 49.83% |
| Democratic | Hubert Humphrey | 358,866 | 43.78% |
| Independent | George Wallace | 49,683 | 6.06% |
| Write-in | | 2,640 | 0.32% |
| Total votes | | 819,622 | 100% |

=== Results by county ===
| County | Richard Nixon Republican | | Hubert Humphrey Democratic | | George Wallace Independent | | Various candidates Write-ins | | Margin | | Total votes cast |
| County | # | % | # | % | # | % | # | % | # | % | Total votes cast |
|---|---|---|---|---|---|---|---|---|---|---|---|
| Baker | 3,311 | 52.93% | 2,464 | 39.39% | 480 | 7.67% | | | 847 | 13.54% | 6,255 |
| Benton | 11,654 | 61.29% | 6,538 | 34.38% | 749 | 3.94% | 75 | 0.39% | 5,116 | 26.91% | 19,016 |
| Clackamas | 32,363 | 50.60% | 27,939 | 43.68% | 3,659 | 5.72% | | | 4,424 | 6.92% | 63,961 |
| Clatsop | 5,810 | 45.61% | 6,243 | 49.01% | 651 | 5.11% | 34 | 0.27% | -433 | -3.40% | 12,738 |
| Columbia | 4,208 | 38.09% | 6,064 | 54.89% | 728 | 6.59% | 47 | 0.43% | -1,856 | -16.80% | 11,047 |
| Coos | 8,230 | 39.40% | 10,884 | 52.10% | 1,767 | 8.46% | 9 | 0.04% | -2,654 | -12.70% | 20,890 |
| Crook | 1,727 | 47.88% | 1,611 | 44.66% | 256 | 7.10% | 13 | 0.36% | 116 | 3.22% | 3,607 |
| Curry | 2,323 | 49.12% | 1,934 | 40.90% | 436 | 9.22% | 36 | 0.76% | 389 | 8.22% | 4,729 |
| Deschutes | 5,599 | 49.86% | 4,859 | 43.27% | 738 | 6.57% | 34 | 0.30% | 740 | 6.59% | 11,230 |
| Douglas | 13,410 | 51.40% | 9,186 | 35.21% | 3,433 | 13.16% | 63 | 0.24% | 4,224 | 16.19% | 26,092 |
| Gilliam | 619 | 55.27% | 436 | 38.93% | 65 | 5.80% | | | 183 | 16.34% | 1,120 |
| Grant | 1,632 | 58.00% | 934 | 33.19% | 239 | 8.49% | 9 | 0.32% | 698 | 24.81% | 2,814 |
| Harney | 1,617 | 56.58% | 1,036 | 36.25% | 197 | 6.89% | 8 | 0.28% | 581 | 20.33% | 2,858 |
| Hood River | 2,597 | 48.84% | 2,385 | 44.86% | 323 | 6.07% | 12 | 0.23% | 212 | 3.98% | 5,317 |
| Jackson | 19,577 | 56.19% | 12,714 | 36.49% | 2,446 | 7.02% | 105 | 0.30% | 6,863 | 19.70% | 34,842 |
| Jefferson | 1,669 | 55.26% | 1,160 | 38.41% | 180 | 5.96% | 11 | 0.36% | 509 | 16.85% | 3,020 |
| Josephine | 8,456 | 57.64% | 4,351 | 29.66% | 1,800 | 12.27% | 64 | 0.44% | 4,105 | 27.98% | 14,671 |
| Klamath | 9,604 | 56.44% | 5,629 | 33.08% | 1,735 | 10.20% | 49 | 0.29% | 3,975 | 23.36% | 17,017 |
| Lake | 1,538 | 61.40% | 730 | 29.14% | 229 | 9.14% | 8 | 0.32% | 808 | 32.26% | 2,505 |
| Lane | 39,563 | 49.12% | 34,521 | 42.86% | 5,830 | 7.24% | 635 | 0.79% | 5,042 | 6.26% | 80,549 |
| Lincoln | 5,031 | 47.02% | 5,009 | 46.82% | 659 | 6.16% | | | 22 | 0.20% | 10,699 |
| Linn | 12,604 | 51.90% | 10,032 | 41.31% | 1,648 | 6.79% | | | 2,572 | 10.59% | 24,284 |
| Malheur | 5,447 | 65.16% | 2,021 | 24.17% | 892 | 10.67% | | | 3,426 | 40.99% | 8,360 |
| Marion | 30,417 | 54.80% | 22,327 | 40.23% | 2,756 | 4.97% | 2 | 0.00% | 8,090 | 14.57% | 55,502 |
| Morrow | 1,068 | 54.30% | 797 | 40.52% | 102 | 5.19% | | | 271 | 13.78% | 1,967 |
| Multnomah | 106,831 | 43.87% | 124,651 | 51.19% | 11,054 | 4.54% | 982 | 0.40% | -17,820 | -7.32% | 243,518 |
| Polk | 6,997 | 55.66% | 4,961 | 39.46% | 581 | 4.62% | 32 | 0.25% | 2,036 | 16.20% | 12,571 |
| Sherman | 646 | 59.32% | 384 | 35.26% | 59 | 5.42% | | | 262 | 24.06% | 1,089 |
| Tillamook | 3,261 | 44.73% | 3,609 | 49.50% | 394 | 5.40% | 27 | 0.37% | -348 | -4.77% | 7,291 |
| Umatilla | 8,975 | 54.80% | 6,402 | 39.09% | 956 | 5.84% | 46 | 0.28% | 2,573 | 15.71% | 16,379 |
| Union | 3,796 | 49.00% | 3,409 | 44.00% | 521 | 6.73% | 21 | 0.27% | 387 | 5.00% | 7,747 |
| Wallowa | 1,527 | 55.69% | 1,006 | 36.69% | 194 | 7.08% | 15 | 0.55% | 521 | 19.00% | 2,742 |
| Wasco | 3,842 | 46.26% | 3,918 | 47.17% | 514 | 6.19% | 32 | 0.39% | -76 | -0.91% | 8,306 |
| Washington | 34,105 | 56.99% | 22,943 | 38.34% | 2,566 | 4.29% | 228 | 0.38% | 11,162 | 18.65% | 59,842 |
| Wheeler | 443 | 58.14% | 292 | 38.32% | 27 | 3.54% | | | 151 | 19.82% | 762 |
| Yamhill | 7,936 | 55.55% | 5,487 | 38.41% | 819 | 5.73% | 43 | 0.30% | 2,449 | 17.14% | 14,285 |
| Totals | 408,433 | 49.83% | 358,866 | 43.78% | 49,683 | 6.06% | 2,640 | 0.32% | 49,567 | 6.05% | 819,622 |

==== Counties that flipped from Democratic to Republican ====
- Baker
- Benton
- Clackamas
- Crook
- Curry
- Deschutes
- Douglas
- Gilliam
- Grant
- Harney
- Hood River
- Jackson
- Jefferson
- Klamath
- Lake
- Lane
- Lincoln
- Linn
- Marion
- Morrow
- Polk
- Sherman
- Umatilla
- Union
- Wallowa
- Washington
- Wheeler
- Yamhill

== See also ==
- United States presidential elections in Oregon
