= Jordan Creek, Oregon =

Unincorporated community in the state of Oregon, United States

- Unincorporated community
- Location within Oregon Location within the United States
- Coordinates: 45°32′54″N 123°36′06″W
- Country: United States
- State: Oregon
- County: Tillamook
- Elevation: 404 ft (123 m)
- Time zone: UTC-8 (Pacific (PST))
  - Summer (DST): UTC-7 (PDT)
- ZIP code: 97141
- Area codes: 503 and 971
- GNIS feature ID: 1122522

Jordan Creek is an unincorporated community in Tillamook County, Oregon, United States. The community is along Oregon Route 6 northeast of Tillamook in the Northern Oregon Coast Range. It lies in the Tillamook State Forest at the confluence of Jordan Creek with the Wilson River.
