= Meda, Oregon =

Unincorporated community in the state of Oregon, United States

- Unincorporated community
- Location within Oregon Location within the United States
- Coordinates: 45°08′47″N 123°54′57″W
- Country: United States
- State: Oregon
- County: Tillamook
- Elevation: 16 ft (4.9 m)
- Time zone: UTC-8 (Pacific (PST))
  - Summer (DST): UTC-7 (PDT)
- ZIP code: 97112
- Area codes: 503 and 971
- GNIS feature ID: 1146070

Meda is an unincorporated community on the Little Nestucca River in Tillamook County, Oregon, United States. It was named in memory of an English woman. Its post office was established on May 11, 1887, with Wallace Yates first of six more postmasters to come. The post office was closed from 1892 to 1915 before resuming service for five more years.
