= Beaver, Oregon =

Unincorporated community in Oregon, US

- Census-designated place (CDP)
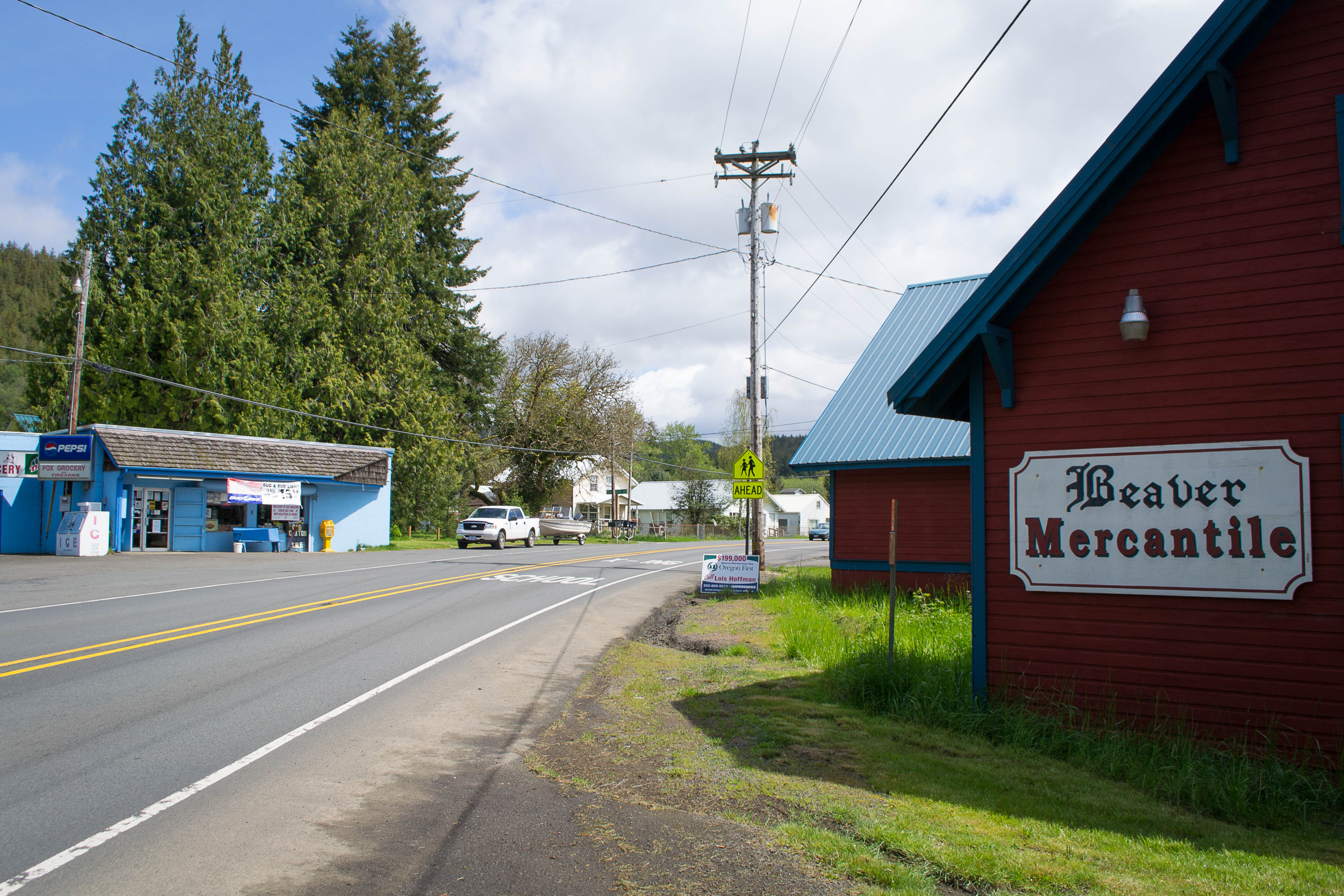

- Location of Beaver, Oregon
- Coordinates: 45°16′27″N 123°49′10″W
- Country: United States
- State: Oregon
- County: Tillamook

Area
  - Total: 0.39 sq mi (1.00 km^{2})
  - Land: 0.39 sq mi (1.00 km^{2})
  - Water: 0 sq mi (0.00 km^{2})
- Elevation: 108 ft (33 m)

Population (2020)
  - Total: 163
  - Density: 421.9/sq mi (162.88/km^{2})
- Time zone: UTC-8 (Pacific (PST))
  - Summer (DST): UTC-7 (PDT)
- ZIP code: 97108
- Area code: 503
- FIPS code: 41-05200
- GNIS feature ID: 2407817

Beaver is an unincorporated community in Tillamook County, Oregon, United States, along U.S. Route 101 and the Nestucca River, about 12 miles (19 km) south of Tillamook. For statistical purposes, the United States Census Bureau has defined Beaver as a census-designated place (CDP). The census definition of the area may not precisely correspond to local understanding of the area with the same name. As of the 2020 census, Beaver had a population of 163.

== History ==
Beaver post office was established in 1889. The American beaver was important to the early economy of the Oregon Country, and numerous places were named for the industrious rodent. The pioneers of Oregon associated the beaver's industry with the growth of their new home.

== Geography ==
According to the United States Census Bureau, the CDP has a total area of 0.4 square miles (1.0 km^{2}), all of it land.

== Demographics ==
Historical population
Census	Pop.	Note	%±
2020	163		—
U.S. Decennial Census

As of the census of 2000, there were 145 people, 60 households, and 43 families residing in the CDP. The population density was 365.1 inhabitants per square mile (141.0/km^{2}). There were 73 housing units at an average density of 183.8 per square mile (71.0/km^{2}). The racial makeup of the CDP was 93.10% White, 1.38% Native American, and 5.52% from two or more races.

There were 60 households, out of which 33.3% had children under the age of 18 living with them, 56.7% were married couples living together, 13.3% had a female householder with no husband present, and 26.7% were non-families. 23.3% of all households were made up of individuals, and 16.7% had someone living alone who was 65 years of age or older. The average household size was 2.42 and the average family size was 2.84.

In the CDP, the population dispersal was 25.5% under the age of 18, 5.5% from 18 to 24, 23.4% from 25 to 44, 29.0% from 45 to 64, and 16.6% who were 65 years of age or older. The median age was 40 years. For every 100 females, there were 90.8 males. For every 100 females age 18 and over, there were 92.9 males. The median income for a household in the CDP was $34,286, and the median income for a family was $38,542. Males had a median income of $21,250 versus $13,750 for females. The per capita income for the CDP was $17,284. None of the families and 7.9% of the population lived below the poverty line, including none under 18 and 26.1% of those over 64.

== Education ==
Beaver is served by the Nestucca Valley School District.

At one time, it was the home of an elementary school and district's middle school, but both are now closed.

The county is in the Tillamook Bay Community College district.

== Parks and recreation ==
Munson Creek Falls, the tallest waterfall in the Oregon Coast Range, is in the Munson Creek Falls State Natural Site near Beaver.
