= 2000 United States presidential election in Oregon =

- November 7, 2000

| Nominee | Al Gore | George W. Bush | Ralph Nader |
| Party | Democratic | Republican | Green |
| Home state | Tennessee | Texas | Connecticut |
| Running mate | Joe Lieberman | Dick Cheney | Winona LaDuke |
| Electoral vote | 7 | 0 | 0 |
| Popular vote | 720,342 | 713,577 | 77,357 |
| Percentage | 46.96% | 46.52% | 5.04% |
County results
Gore
40–50%
50–60%
60–70%
Bush
40–50%
50–60%
60–70%
70–80%
80–90%
President before election
Bill Clinton
Democratic
Elected President
George W. Bush
Republican

The 2000 United States presidential election in Oregon was held on Tuesday, November 7, 2000, as part of the concurrent United States presidential election. Voters chose seven electors, or representatives to the Electoral College, to vote for the next president and vice president of the United States.

The state of Oregon voted for Democrat Al Gore over Republican George W. Bush by a narrow margin of 0.44%, or 6,765 votes. This made the state 0.07% to the right of the nation at-large and the closest to the national popular vote results. Oregon has been considered a blue state in recent years, voting for the Democratic Party in every presidential election since 1988. Despite this, Gore's performance was relatively weak considering the state's typical partisan lean. This is the closest that Oregon has come to voting for a Republican for president since Ronald Reagan carried the state in 1984.

This also marks the last election in which the margin of victory in Oregon was less than a percentage point, the last time that the Democratic candidate failed to win a majority in the state, and the last time that the state would vote more Republican than the nation. Four years later, John Kerry would win the state by a larger, yet somewhat modest, margin; from 2008 onward, Oregon would be considered a safely blue state on the presidential level. Almost eighty percent of registered voters came out to vote on election day, the highest in the country.

Bush became the first Republican ever to win the White House without carrying Washington County.

== General election ==
=== Polling ===
| Poll source | Date(s) | Sample size | Margin of error | George W. Bush (R) | Al Gore (D) | Ralph Nader (G) | Other / undecided (Note: Calculated by taking the difference of 100% and all other listed candidates combined. For polls that do not report a figure for Nader, this includes his support.) |
|---|---|---|---|---|---|---|---|
| Harris Insights & Analytics | November 3, 2000 | 3,376 | — | 42% | 49% | 7% | 2% |
| SurveyUSA | October 30, 2000 | 500 | — | 50% | 42% | — | 8% |
| DHM Research | October 27, 2000 | 600 | — | 44% | 45% | 4% | 7% |
| SurveyUSA | October 26, 2000 | 500 | — | 48% | 42% | — | 10% |
| American Research Group | October 22, 2000 | 600 | — | 45% | 41% | 10% | 4% |
| Rasmussen Reports | October 21, 2000 | 1,352 | — | 43% | 38% | — | 19% |

=== Results ===
2000 United States presidential election in Oregon
| Party | Candidate | Votes | Percentage | Electoral votes |
|---|---|---|---|---|
| Democratic | Al Gore | 720,342 | 46.96% | 7 |
| Republican | George W. Bush | 713,577 | 46.52% | 0 |
| Pacific Green | Ralph Nader | 77,357 | 5.04% | 0 |
| Libertarian | Harry Browne | 7,447 | 0.49% | 0 |
| Reform | Pat Buchanan | 7,063 | 0.46% | 0 |
| Write-ins | Write-ins | 3,419 | 0.22% | 0 |
| Natural Law | John Hagelin | 2,574 | 0.17% | 0 |
| Constitution | Howard Phillips | 2,189 | 0.14% | 0 |
| Totals | | 1,533,968 | 100.00% | 7 |
| Voter turnout (voting age population) | | | | 64.7% |

==== Results by county ====
| County | Al Gore Democratic | | George W. Bush Republican | | Ralph Nader Pacific Green | | Various candidates Other parties | | Margin | | Total votes cast |
| County | # | % | # | % | # | % | # | % | # | % | Total votes cast |
|---|---|---|---|---|---|---|---|---|---|---|---|
| Baker | 2,195 | 26.58% | 5,618 | 68.03% | 289 | 3.50% | 156 | 1.89% | -3,423 | -41.45% | 8,258 |
| Benton | 19,444 | 50.87% | 15,825 | 41.40% | 2,463 | 6.44% | 494 | 1.29% | 3,619 | 9.47% | 38,226 |
| Clackamas | 76,421 | 47.10% | 77,539 | 47.79% | 6,357 | 3.92% | 1,945 | 1.20% | -1,118 | -0.69% | 162,262 |
| Clatsop | 8,296 | 50.36% | 6,950 | 42.19% | 939 | 5.70% | 289 | 1.75% | 1,346 | 8.17% | 16,474 |
| Columbia | 10,331 | 48.74% | 9,369 | 44.20% | 970 | 4.58% | 525 | 2.48% | 962 | 4.54% | 21,195 |
| Coos | 11,610 | 39.52% | 15,626 | 53.19% | 1,410 | 4.80% | 733 | 2.49% | -4,016 | -13.67% | 29,379 |
| Crook | 2,474 | 29.89% | 5,363 | 64.79% | 258 | 3.12% | 182 | 2.20% | -2,889 | -34.90% | 8,277 |
| Curry | 4,090 | 35.53% | 6,551 | 56.90% | 603 | 5.24% | 269 | 2.34% | -2,461 | -21.37% | 11,513 |
| Deschutes | 22,061 | 38.11% | 32,132 | 55.51% | 2,799 | 4.84% | 893 | 1.54% | -10,071 | -17.40% | 57,885 |
| Douglas | 14,193 | 30.06% | 30,294 | 64.16% | 1,768 | 3.74% | 965 | 2.04% | -16,101 | -34.10% | 47,220 |
| Gilliam | 359 | 32.94% | 679 | 62.29% | 37 | 3.39% | 15 | 1.38% | -320 | -29.35% | 1,090 |
| Grant | 589 | 15.31% | 3,078 | 80.03% | 98 | 2.55% | 81 | 2.11% | -2,489 | -64.72% | 3,846 |
| Harney | 766 | 20.51% | 2,799 | 74.96% | 84 | 2.25% | 85 | 2.28% | -2,033 | -54.45% | 3,734 |
| Hood River | 4,072 | 47.63% | 3,721 | 43.53% | 645 | 7.54% | 111 | 1.30% | 351 | 4.10% | 8,549 |
| Jackson | 33,153 | 39.10% | 46,052 | 54.31% | 4,207 | 4.96% | 1,384 | 1.63% | -12,899 | -15.21% | 84,796 |
| Jefferson | 2,681 | 38.87% | 3,838 | 55.65% | 247 | 3.58% | 131 | 1.90% | -1,157 | -16.78% | 6,897 |
| Josephine | 11,864 | 32.30% | 22,186 | 60.40% | 1,783 | 4.85% | 900 | 2.45% | -10,322 | -28.10% | 36,733 |
| Klamath | 7,541 | 27.08% | 18,855 | 67.72% | 867 | 3.11% | 581 | 2.09% | -11,314 | -40.64% | 27,844 |
| Lake | 707 | 18.96% | 2,830 | 75.89% | 108 | 2.90% | 84 | 2.25% | -2,123 | -56.93% | 3,729 |
| Lane | 78,583 | 51.64% | 61,578 | 40.46% | 10,245 | 6.73% | 1,782 | 1.17% | 17,005 | 11.18% | 152,188 |
| Lincoln | 10,861 | 51.43% | 8,446 | 39.99% | 1,435 | 6.80% | 376 | 1.78% | 2,415 | 11.44% | 21,118 |
| Linn | 16,682 | 37.58% | 25,359 | 57.13% | 1,617 | 3.64% | 730 | 1.64% | -8,677 | -19.55% | 44,388 |
| Malheur | 2,336 | 22.45% | 7,624 | 73.28% | 248 | 2.38% | 196 | 1.88% | -5,288 | -50.83% | 10,404 |
| Marion | 49,430 | 43.61% | 57,443 | 50.68% | 4,679 | 4.13% | 1,782 | 1.57% | -8,013 | -7.07% | 113,334 |
| Morrow | 1,197 | 33.17% | 2,224 | 61.62% | 87 | 2.41% | 101 | 2.80% | -1,027 | -28.45% | 3,609 |
| Multnomah | 188,441 | 63.52% | 83,677 | 28.20% | 21,048 | 7.09% | 3,519 | 1.19% | 104,764 | 35.32% | 296,685 |
| Polk | 11,921 | 41.90% | 14,988 | 52.68% | 1,201 | 4.22% | 339 | 1.19% | -3,067 | -10.78% | 28,449 |
| Sherman | 326 | 30.70% | 679 | 63.94% | 36 | 3.39% | 21 | 1.98% | -353 | -33.24% | 1,062 |
| Tillamook | 5,762 | 46.56% | 5,775 | 46.66% | 613 | 4.95% | 226 | 1.83% | -13 | -0.10% | 12,376 |
| Umatilla | 7,809 | 33.86% | 14,140 | 61.32% | 655 | 2.84% | 456 | 1.98% | -6,331 | -27.46% | 23,060 |
| Union | 3,577 | 29.62% | 7,836 | 64.89% | 436 | 3.61% | 227 | 1.88% | -4,259 | -35.27% | 12,076 |
| Wallowa | 836 | 19.47% | 3,279 | 76.36% | 114 | 2.65% | 65 | 1.51% | -2,443 | -56.89% | 4,294 |
| Wasco | 4,616 | 43.29% | 5,356 | 50.23% | 513 | 4.81% | 179 | 1.68% | -740 | -6.94% | 10,664 |
| Washington | 90,662 | 48.75% | 86,091 | 46.29% | 6,985 | 3.76% | 2,236 | 1.20% | 4,571 | 2.46% | 185,974 |
| Wheeler | 202 | 24.02% | 584 | 69.44% | 27 | 3.21% | 28 | 3.33% | -382 | -45.42% | 841 |
| Yamhill | 14,254 | 40.11% | 19,193 | 54.01% | 1,486 | 4.18% | 606 | 1.71% | -4,939 | -13.90% | 35,539 |
| Total | 720,342 | 46.96% | 713,577 | 46.52% | 77,357 | 5.04% | 22,692 | 1.48% | 6,765 | 0.44% | 1,533,968 |

Counties that flipped from Democratic to Republican

- Clackamas (largest city: Lake Oswego)
- Coos (largest city: Coos Bay)
- Gilliam (largest city: Condon)
- Marion (largest city: Salem)
- Morrow (largest city: Boardman)
- Tillamook (largest city: Tillamook)
- Wasco (largest city: The Dalles)

==== Results by congressional district ====
Despite losing the state, Bush won three of five congressional districts, including two held by Democrats.

| District | Gore | Bush | Representative |
|---|---|---|---|
| 1st | 51% | 44% | David Wu |
| 2nd | 34% | 59% | Greg Walden |
| 3rd | 61% | 31% | Earl Blumenauer |
| 4th | 44% | 49% | Peter DeFazio |
| 5th | 46% | 48% | Darlene Hooley |

== See also ==
- United States presidential elections in Oregon
- Presidency of George W. Bush
