= 1928 United States presidential election in Oregon =

- November 6, 1928

Nominee	Herbert Hoover	Al Smith
Party	Republican	Democratic
Home state	California	New York
Running mate	Charles Curtis	Joseph T. Robinson
Electoral vote	5	0
Popular vote	205,341	109,223
Percentage	64.18%	34.14%
County results
Hoover
50–60%
60–70%
70–80%
President before election
Calvin Coolidge
Republican
Elected President
Herbert Hoover
Republican

The 1928 United States presidential election in Oregon took place on November 6, 1928, as part of the 1928 United States presidential election. Voters chose five representatives, or electors, to the Electoral College, who voted for president and vice president.

Outside a few presidential and gubernatorial elections like that of 1922 influenced by the Ku Klux Klan, Oregon was a virtually one-party Republican state during the “System of 1896”, where the only competition was via Republican primaries. Apart from Woodrow Wilson’s two elections, during the first of which the GOP was severely divided, no Democrat since William Jennings Bryan in 1900 had carried a single county in the state.

In 1924 Oregon had nonetheless been the fifth-strongest of the fifteen Western and Plains States for Democrat John W. Davis behind Ozark mountaineer-dominated Nebraska, Mormon Utah and southern-leaning New Mexico and Arizona. Moreover, although maverick Wisconsin Senator Robert M. La Follette Sr. fared less well than in the other Pacific States, he still gained nearly one in four of Oregon's ballots as an independent. However, when La Follette died in 1925 his family endorsed New York City Catholic Democrat Al Smith, towards whose faith Oregon's largely Puritan (in the northwest) or Ozark Methodist (in the south and east), Anglo-Saxon and fiercely anti-Catholic populace was strongly hostile. This had been seen in a notorious law outlawing private religious schools under Klan-supported Governor Walter M. Pierce, whose decision was viewed unconstitutional by both the Oregon Supreme Court in 1924 and federally in Pierce v. Society of Sisters a year later.

Despite this severe wariness, Smith won the state's Democratic presidential primary against token opposition from Missouri Senator James Reed and Montana Senator Thomas Walsh, whilst former Secretary of Commerce Herbert Hoover won the state's Republican primary unopposed with over six times as many voters. From the beginning polls showed opposition to Smith's Catholicism and anti-Prohibition views as very strong in Oregon, and neither major party would campaign in the state during the fall. October polls showed Hoover winning the state by a two-to-one margin and Smith gaining no more than a quarter of the La Follette vote. As of 2020, this is the final presidential election in Oregon in which a Republican carried all of the state's counties.

Whereas in more Catholic states of the northern “Frost Belt” like Wisconsin, North Dakota and Minnesota Smith was able to revive a moribund Democratic Party at a presidential level, Oregon's smaller but still significant La Follette electorate concentrated in the lower Willamette Valley and arch-isolationist Southern Oregon balked at voting for a Catholic. Consequently, Republican nominee Hoover was able to gain 13.17 percent upon Calvin Coolidge’s 1924 performance in Oregon and become the fifth Republican in seven presidential elections to sweep all Oregon’s counties.

This would be the last occasion until Donald Trump in 2016 that Columbia County voted for a Republican presidential candidate.

== Results ==
Presidential Candidate	Running Mate	Party	Electoral Vote (EV)	Popular Vote (PV)	
Herbert Hoover of California	Charles Curtis	Republican	5	205,341	64.18%
Al Smith	Joseph T. Robinson	Democratic	0	109,223	34.14%
Norman Thomas	James Maurer	Socialist Principles Independent	0	2,720	0.85%
Verne L. Reynolds	Jeremiah Crowley	Socialist Labor	0	1,564	0.49%
William Z. Foster	Benjamin Gitlow	Independent	0	1,094	0.34%

=== Results by county ===
County	Herbert Hoover Republican		Al Smith Democratic		Norman Thomas Socialist Principles Independent		Verne L. Reynolds Socialist Labor		William Z. Foster Independent		Margin		Total votes cast
County	#	%	#	%	#	%	#	%	#	%	#	%	Total votes cast
Baker	3,721	65.52%	1,861	32.77%	64	1.13%	22	0.39%	11	0.19%	1,860	32.75%	5,679
Benton	4,605	75.55%	1,412	23.17%	37	0.61%	17	0.28%	24	0.39%	3,193	52.39%	6,095
Clackamas	9,216	59.51%	5,918	38.22%	157	1.01%	130	0.84%	65	0.42%	3,298	21.30%	15,486
Clatsop	4,087	63.33%	2,208	34.21%	31	0.48%	37	0.57%	91	1.41%	1,879	29.11%	6,454
Columbia	3,519	65.21%	1,775	32.89%	34	0.63%	44	0.82%	24	0.44%	1,744	32.32%	5,396
Coos	4,929	60.66%	3,040	37.41%	62	0.76%	67	0.82%	28	0.34%	1,889	23.25%	8,126
Crook	877	63.46%	487	35.24%	10	0.72%	4	0.29%	4	0.29%	390	28.22%	1,382
Curry	694	59.16%	453	38.62%	14	1.19%	4	0.34%	8	0.68%	241	20.55%	1,173
Deschutes	2,815	60.83%	1,702	36.78%	29	0.63%	77	1.66%	5	0.11%	1,113	24.05%	4,628
Douglas	5,609	70.52%	2,191	27.55%	51	0.64%	55	0.69%	48	0.60%	3,418	42.97%	7,954
Gilliam	880	62.50%	515	36.58%	6	0.43%	2	0.14%	5	0.36%	365	25.92%	1,408
Grant	1,411	74.03%	469	24.61%	13	0.68%	10	0.52%	3	0.16%	942	49.42%	1,906
Harney	952	60.60%	600	38.19%	8	0.51%	6	0.38%	5	0.32%	352	22.41%	1,571
Hood River	1,806	65.22%	905	32.68%	18	0.65%	15	0.54%	25	0.90%	901	32.54%	2,769
Jackson	8,053	75.43%	2,463	23.07%	88	0.82%	41	0.38%	31	0.29%	5,590	52.36%	10,676
Jefferson	481	59.31%	308	37.98%	6	0.74%	8	0.99%	8	0.99%	173	21.33%	811
Josephine	2,625	71.31%	959	26.05%	44	1.20%	36	0.98%	17	0.46%	1,666	45.26%	3,681
Klamath	4,453	61.28%	2,721	37.44%	32	0.44%	31	0.43%	30	0.41%	1,732	23.83%	7,267
Lake	1,014	63.61%	549	34.44%	10	0.63%	9	0.56%	12	0.75%	465	29.17%	1,594
Lane	13,647	74.96%	4,213	23.14%	179	0.98%	93	0.51%	73	0.40%	9,434	51.82%	18,205
Lincoln	2,100	57.33%	1,464	39.97%	46	1.26%	32	0.87%	21	0.57%	636	17.36%	3,663
Linn	5,877	67.62%	2,645	30.43%	72	0.83%	45	0.52%	52	0.60%	3,232	37.19%	8,691
Malheur	2,164	67.35%	1,016	31.62%	18	0.56%	11	0.34%	4	0.12%	1,148	35.73%	3,213
Marion	11,754	61.96%	6,998	36.89%	102	0.54%	69	0.36%	48	0.25%	4,756	25.07%	18,971
Morrow	1,093	64.87%	543	32.23%	23	1.36%	14	0.83%	12	0.71%	550	32.64%	1,685
Multnomah	75,731	61.64%	45,177	36.77%	1,219	0.99%	447	0.36%	285	0.23%	30,554	24.87%	122,859
Polk	3,244	64.44%	1,724	34.25%	30	0.60%	20	0.40%	16	0.32%	1,520	30.19%	5,034
Sherman	759	66.35%	375	32.78%	2	0.17%	5	0.44%	3	0.26%	384	33.57%	1,144
Tillamook	2,570	66.75%	1,204	31.27%	32	0.83%	28	0.73%	16	0.42%	1,366	35.48%	3,850
Umatilla	5,277	67.83%	2,390	30.72%	59	0.76%	34	0.44%	20	0.26%	2,887	37.11%	7,780
Union	3,219	59.13%	2,154	39.57%	26	0.48%	30	0.55%	15	0.28%	1,065	19.56%	5,444
Wallowa	1,326	56.86%	935	40.09%	39	1.67%	19	0.81%	13	0.56%	391	16.77%	2,332
Wasco	2,746	60.85%	1,699	37.65%	30	0.66%	21	0.47%	17	0.38%	1,047	23.20%	4,513
Washington	6,162	62.37%	3,544	35.87%	91	0.92%	55	0.56%	27	0.27%	2,618	26.50%	9,879
Wheeler	677	75.06%	224	24.83%	1	0.11%	0	0.00%	0	0.00%	453	50.22%	902
Yamhill	5,248	67.97%	2,382	30.85%	38	0.49%	25	0.32%	28	0.36%	2,866	37.12%	7,721
Totals	205,341	64.18%	109,223	34.14%	2,720	0.85%	1,564	0.49%	1,094	0.34%	96,118	30.04%	319,942

== See also ==
- United States presidential elections in Oregon
