= Brighton, Oregon =

Unincorporated community in the state of Oregon, United States

Brighton
- Unincorporated community
- Location within the state of Oregon Brighton (the United States)
- Coordinates: 45°40′20″N 123°55′22″W
- Country: United States
- State: Oregon
- County: Tillamook
- Elevation: 95 ft (29 m)
- Time zone: UTC-8 (Pacific (PST))
  - Summer (DST): UTC-7 (PDT)
- Area codes: 503 and 971
- GNIS feature ID: 1166621

Brighton is an unincorporated community in Tillamook County, Oregon, United States. It is about 3 kilometres (2 mi) southwest of Wheeler on U.S. Route 101 next to Nehalem Bay, across the bay from Nehalem Bay State Park.

A town was platted at this locale in 1910 and named Brighton Beach, although it is not directly on the Pacific Ocean. It was named for the seaside resort of Brighton, England, and it was hoped the place would become a popular vacation spot. Brighton post office was established in 1912 and closed in 1957. Brighton Beach was also the name of the Southern Pacific Railroad station on the Tillamook Branch. Today the line is owned by the Port of Tillamook Bay Railroad (POTB). The Oregon Coast Scenic Railroad, a non-profit museum group, operates a heritage railroad in conjunction with the POTB that runs dinner trains from Garibaldi to Wheeler that pass through Brighton.

In the early 20th century, Brighton was the home of the Brighton Mills Company, which ran a sawmill and planing mill. The company was founded in 1911 by the Watt brothers of Bay City. The mill closed in 1926, however, during World War I, it was credited with producing more spruce lumber for aircraft than any other mill in the country.

== See also ==
- Spruce Production Division
