= Munson Creek Falls State Natural Site =

State park in Oregon, United States

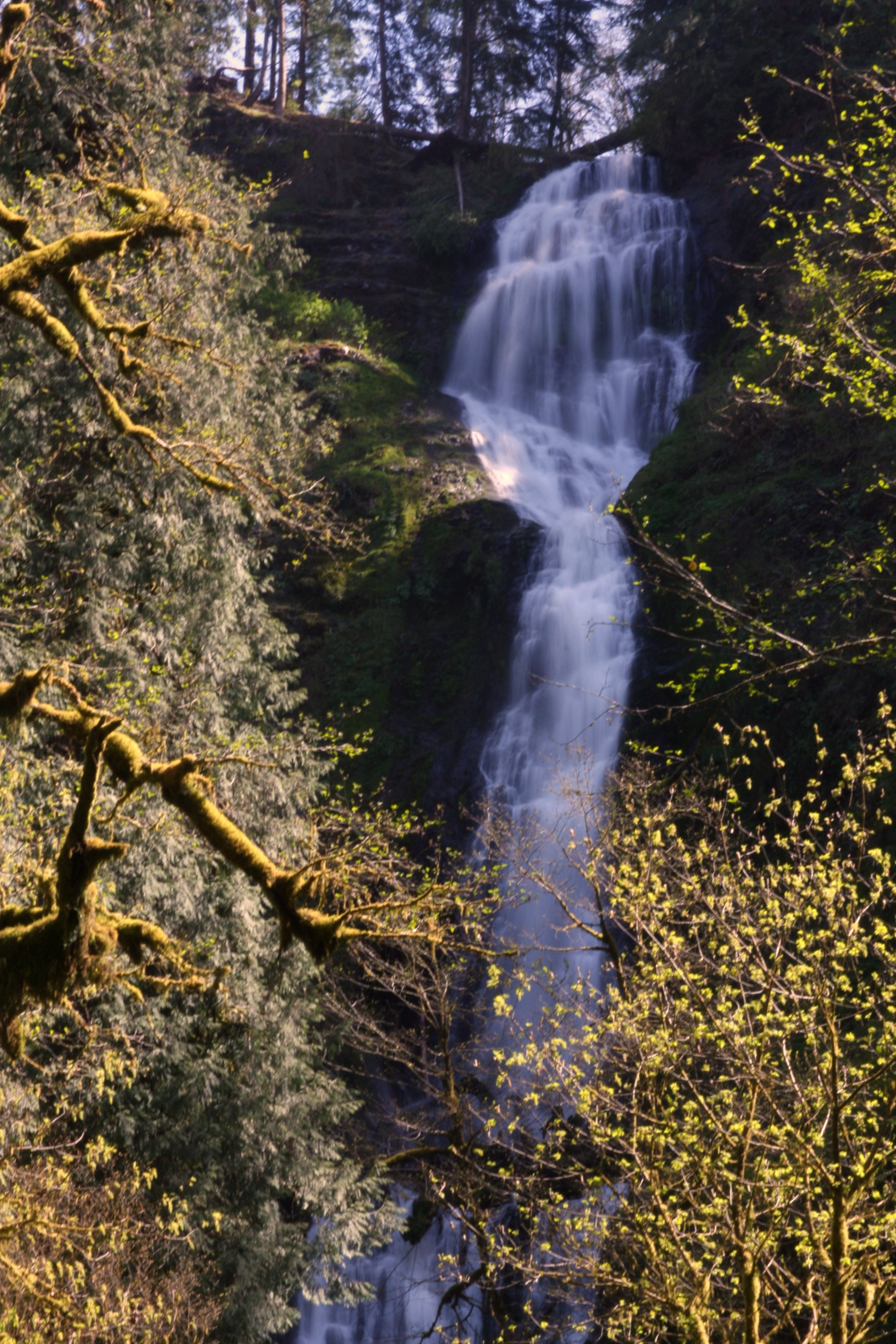
- Munson Creek Falls

- Location within Oregon Location within the United States
- Type: Public, state
- Location: Tillamook County, Oregon
- Nearest city: Tillamook
- Coordinates: 45°21′53″N 123°46′20″W
- Operator: Oregon Parks and Recreation Department

Munson Creek Falls State Natural Site is a state park in the U.S. state of Oregon, administered by the Oregon Parks and Recreation Department. The park contains Munson Creek Falls, which is the tallest waterfall in Oregon's Coast Range. A short hike of 0.5 miles (0.80 km) leads to views of the 319 feet (97 m) waterfall.

== See also ==
- List of Oregon state parks
