= Tillamook County, Oregon =

County in Oregon, United States

- County
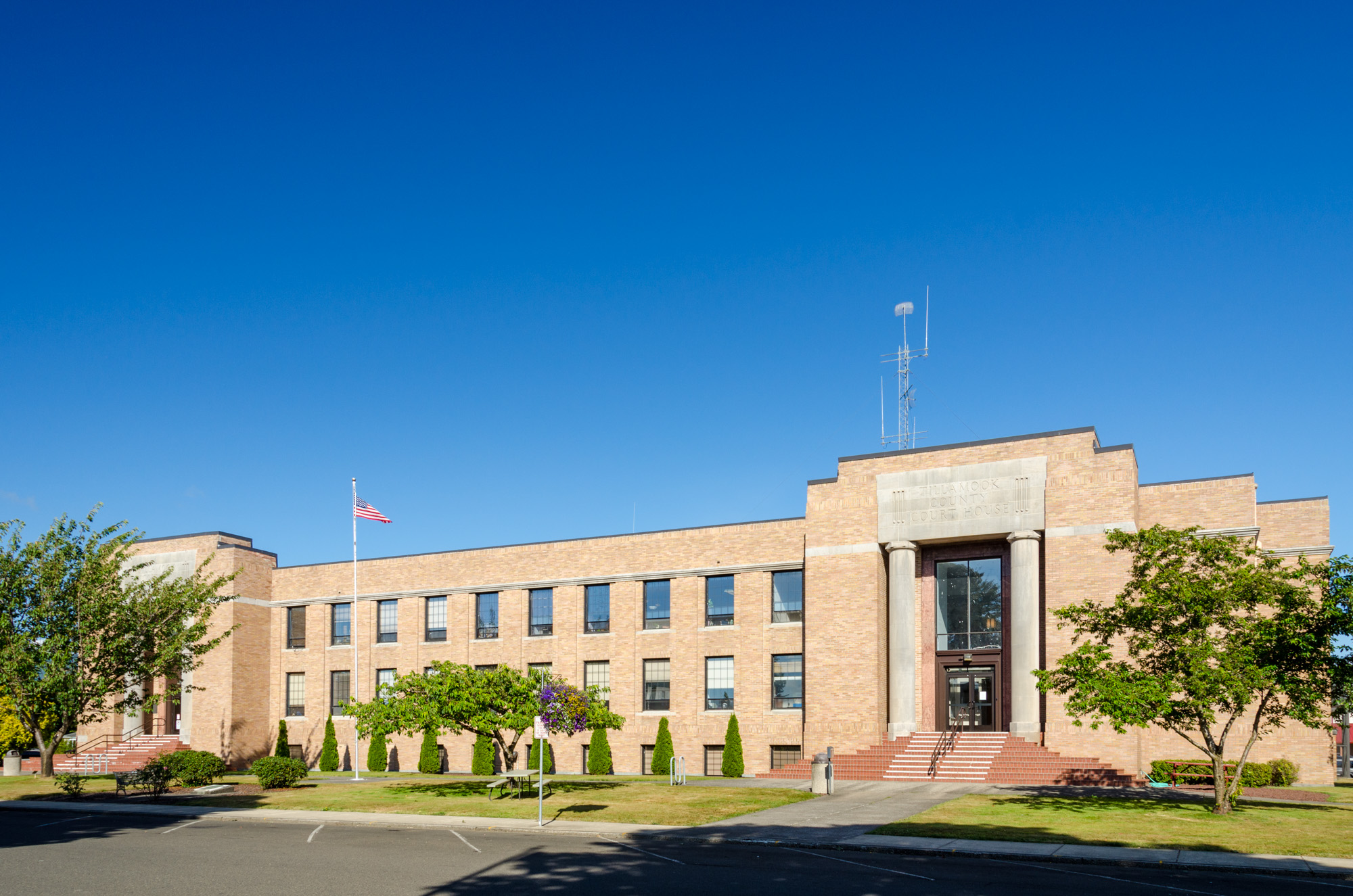
- Tillamook County Courthouse in Tillamook

- Location within the U.S. state of Oregon
- Coordinates: 45°28′N 123°42′W
- Country: United States
- State: Oregon
- Founded: December 15, 1853
- Named for: Tillamook people
- Seat: Tillamook
- Largest city: Tillamook

Area
  - Total: 1,333 sq mi (3,450 km^{2})
  - Land: 1,103 sq mi (2,860 km^{2})
  - Water: 230 sq mi (600 km^{2}) 17%

Population (2020)
  - Total: 27,390
  - Estimate (2025): 27,384 ▼
  - Density: 23/sq mi (8.9/km^{2})
- Congressional district: 1st
- Website: www.tillamookcounty.gov

Tillamook County is one of the 36 counties in the U.S. state of Oregon. As of the 2020 census, the population was 27,390. The county seat is Tillamook. The county is named for the Tillamook people or Killamook people, a Native American tribe who were living in the area in the early 19th century at the time of European American settlement. The county is located within Northwest Oregon.

== History ==
The Tillamook were the southernmost branch of the Coast Salish. They were separated from their more northern kinsmen by tribes speaking the Chinookian languages. The name Tillamook is of Chinook origin (a trade pidgin, which had developed along the lower Columbia.) According to Frank Boas, "It [Tillamook] means the people of Nekelim. The latter name means the place of Elim, or in the Cathlamet dialect, the place of Kelim. The initial t of Tillamook is the plural article, the terminal ook the Chinook plural ending —uks." Since there was one village in the area of Nehalem bay; the area was referred to as Nekelim (Ne Elim=singular). There were at least four villages on the south Tillamook bay according to Lewis and Clark; the south bay was called "T-Elim-ook" (the plural of Elim), meaning many villages of Elim. The Chinook word for water was "chuck" and the Salish word for wetland is "naslex". The popular translation of Tillamook as meaning "land of many waters" seems to be 20th-century fabrication used in the tourist industry.

Tillamook County, the 12th county in Oregon to be organized, was established on December 15, 1853, when the Territorial Legislature approved an act to create the new county out of an area previously included in Clatsop, Yamhill and Polk counties. Boundary changes were enacted with Clatsop County (1855, 1870, and 1893), Lincoln County in 1893, Washington County (1893, 1898), and Yamhill County (1887).

The Coast Range behind Tillamook was the scene of a repeated series of forest fires called the Tillamook Burn between 1933 and 1951. In 1948, a state ballot approved the sale of bonds to buy the burned-over areas and have the state rehabilitate the lands. The state lands were renamed the Tillamook State Forest by governor Tom McCall on July 18, 1973. By the end of the 20th century, the replanted growth was considered mature enough to be commercially harvested.

=== Naval Air Station Tillamook ===
The Tillamook airbase for blimps was commissioned on December 1, 1942, as U.S. Naval Air Station Tillamook. The two wooden hangars used to house these airships were decommissioned after World War II and deeded to Tillamook County. One of the hangars (Hangar B) is a national historic landmark and the location of the Tillamook Air Museum. The other hangar, (Hangar A) burned down in 1992.

The U.S. Mount Hebo Air Force Station was a Cold War air defense installation from 1956 to 1980. Located south of Tillamook, at the top of 3,154-foot (961 m) high Mount Hebo, Air Force radars operated by the 689th Radar Squadron and the 14th Missile Warning Squadron were essential parts of the nation's integrated air defenses. The large radomes protecting the radars from adverse weather effects could be seen silhouetted against the sky from most of Tillamook County.

Development along U.S. Route 101 to the north of Tillamook during the last part of the 20th century has blocked part of the flood plain of the Wilson River, contributing to repeated winter flooding in the city. Until the late 1950s, there was a dredge used by the city to keep the sloughs deeper.

== Geography ==
Map of Tillamook County

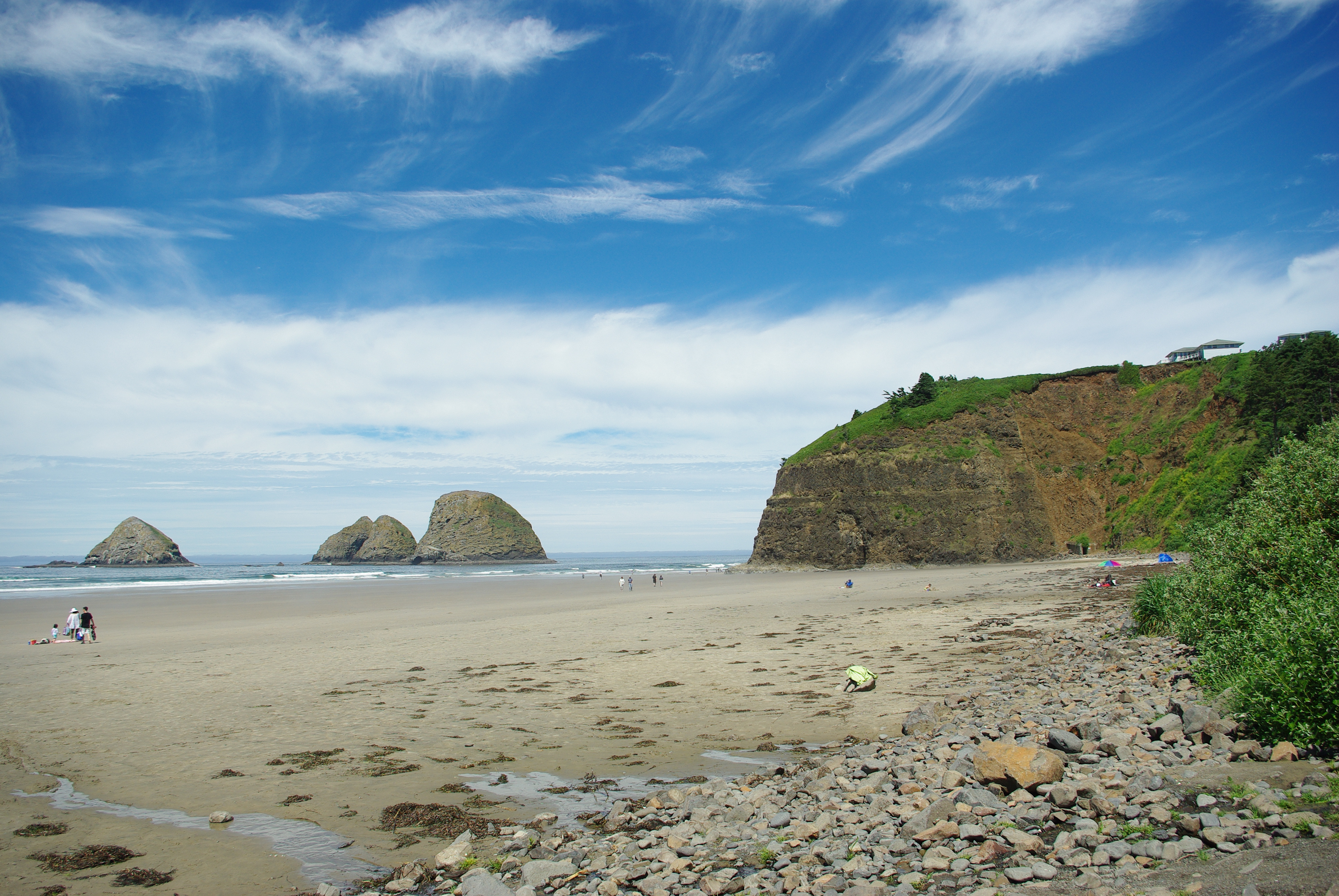
Beach at Oceanside and Three Arch Rocks National Wildlife Refuge

According to the United States Census Bureau, the county has a total area of 1,333 square miles (3,450 km^{2}), of which 1,103 square miles (2,860 km^{2}) is land and 230 square miles (600 km^{2}) (17%) is water. At 3,706 feet (1,130 m) in elevation, Rogers Peak is the highest point in the county and the highest in the Northern Oregon Coast Range.

The county has been called "a natural cow pasture" by Sunset Magazine.

=== Adjacent counties ===
- Clatsop County (north)
- Washington County (east)
- Yamhill County (east)
- Polk County (southeast)
- Lincoln County (south)

=== National protected areas ===
- Cape Meares National Wildlife Refuge
- Nestucca Bay National Wildlife Refuge
- Oregon Islands National Wildlife Refuge (part)
- Siuslaw National Forest (part)
- Three Arch Rocks National Wildlife Refuge

== Demographics ==
Historical population
Census	Pop.	Note	%±
1860	95		—
1870	408		329.5%
1880	970		137.7%
1890	2,932		202.3%
1900	4,471		52.5%
1910	6,266		40.1%
1920	8,810		40.6%
1930	11,824		34.2%
1940	12,263		3.7%
1950	18,606		51.7%
1960	18,955		1.9%
1970	17,930		−5.4%
1980	21,164		18.0%
1990	21,570		1.9%
2000	24,262		12.5%
2010	25,250		4.1%
2020	27,390		8.5%
2025 (est.)	27,384	▼	0.0%
U.S. Decennial Census; 1790–1960 1900–1990; 1990–2000 2010–2020

=== 2020 census ===
Tillamook County, Oregon – Racial and ethnic composition Note: the US Census treats Hispanic/Latino as an ethnic category. This table excludes Latinos from the racial categories and assigns them to a separate category. Hispanics/Latinos may be of any race.
Race / Ethnicity (NH = Non-Hispanic)	Pop 1980	Pop 1990	Pop 2000	Pop 2010	Pop 2020	% 1980	% 1990	% 2000	% 2010	% 2020
White alone (NH)	20,573	20,765	22,086	21,902	22,000	97.21%	96.27%	91.03%	86.74%	80.32%
Black or African American alone (NH)	35	38	42	62	76	0.17%	0.18%	0.17%	0.25%	0.28%
Native American or Alaska Native alone (NH)	194	231	273	220	239	0.92%	1.07%	1.13%	0.87%	0.87%
Asian alone (NH)	97	154	154	223	280	0.46%	0.71%	0.63%	0.88%	1.02%
Native Hawaiian or Pacific Islander alone (NH)	x	x	50	56	85	x	x	0.21%	0.22%	0.31%
Other race alone (NH)	56	8	9	25	141	0.26%	0.04%	0.04%	0.10%	0.51%
Mixed race or Multiracial (NH)	x	x	404	478	1,623	x	x	1.67%	1.89%	5.93%
Hispanic or Latino (any race)	209	374	1,244	2,284	2,946	0.99%	1.73%	5.13%	9.05%	10.76%
Total	21,164	21,570	24,262	25,250	27,390	100.00%	100.00%	100.00%	100.00%	100.00%

As of the 2020 census, there were 27,390 people residing in the county; 18.2% were under the age of 18 and 27.3% were 65 years of age or older, and the median age was 49.2 years. For every 100 females there were 100.9 males, and for every 100 females age 18 and over there were 98.7 males. 39.3% of residents lived in urban areas and 60.7% lived in rural areas.

The racial makeup of the county was 82.6% White, 0.3% Black or African American, 1.1% American Indian and Alaska Native, 1.0% Asian, 0.3% Native Hawaiian and Pacific Islander, 5.1% from some other race, and 9.6% from two or more races. Hispanic or Latino residents of any race comprised 10.8% of the population.

There were 11,727 households in the county, of which 22.2% had children under the age of 18 living with them and 24.6% had a female householder with no spouse or partner present. About 29.4% of all households were made up of individuals and 15.8% had someone living alone who was 65 years of age or older.

There were 18,919 housing units, of which 38.0% were vacant. Among occupied housing units, 71.0% were owner-occupied and 29.0% were renter-occupied. The homeowner vacancy rate was 1.6% and the rental vacancy rate was 10.9%.

=== 2010 census ===
As of the census of 2010, there were 25,250 people, 10,834 households and 6,930 families residing in the county. The population density was 22.9 inhabitants per square mile (8.8/km^{2}). There were 18,359 housing units at an average density of 16.7 units per square mile (6.4 units/km^{2}). The racial makeup of the county was 91.5% white, 1.0% American Indian, 0.9% Asian, 0.3% black or African American, 0.2% Pacific islander, 3.6% from other races, and 2.4% from two or more races. Those of Hispanic or Latino origin made up 9.0% of the population. In terms of ancestry, 26.9% were German, 17.2% were English, 12.1% were Irish, and 5.2% were American.

Of the 10,834 households, 23.8% had children under the age of 18 living with them, 51.6% were married couples living together, 8.1% had a female householder with no husband present, 36.0% were non-families, and 29.1% of all households were made up of individuals. The average household size was 2.29 and the average family size was 2.79. The median age was 47.5 years.

The median income for a household in the county was $39,412 and the median income for a family was $50,779. Males had a median income of $39,019 versus $32,688 for females. The per capita income for the county was $22,824. About 12.8% of families and 16.9% of the population were below the poverty line, including 26.8% of those under age 18 and 10.2% of those age 65 or over.

=== 2000 census ===
As of the census of 2000, there were 24,262 people, 10,200 households and 6,793 families residing in the county. The population density was 22 people per square mile (8.5 people/km^{2}). There were 15,906 housing units at an average density of 14 units per square mile (5.4/km^{2}). The racial makeup of the county was 93.86% White, 0.22% Black or African American, 1.19% Native American, 0.65% Asian, 0.21% Pacific Islander, 1.89% from other races, and 1.98% from two or more races. 5.13% of the population were Hispanic or Latino of any race. 20.1% were of German, 13.3% English, 10.7% American and 8.6% Irish ancestry.

There were 10,200 households, out of which 24.6% had children under the age of 18 living with them, 54.8% were married couples living together, 7.7% had a female householder with no husband present, and 33.4% were non-families. 27.9% of all households were made up of individuals, and 12.6% had someone living alone who was 65 years of age or older. The average household size was 2.33 and the average family size was 2.82.

In the county, the population was spread out, with 22.2% under the age of 18, 6.5% from 18 to 24, 23.5% from 25 to 44, 28% from 45 to 64, and 19.8% who were 65 years of age or older. The median age was 44 years. For every 100 females there were 100.4 males. For every 100 females age 18 and over, there were 98.1 males.

The median income for a household in the county was $34,269, and the median income for a family was $40,197. Males had a median income of $31,509 versus $21,555 for females. The per capita income for the county was $19,052. About 8.1% of families and 11.4% of the population were below the poverty line, including 13.4% of those under age 18 and 8.1% of those age 65 or over.

== Economy ==
=== Agriculture ===
Dairy farming is one of the county's largest agricultural occupations. The Tillamook Cheese Factory is the county's largest business and the largest private employer. Tillamook dairy products are available throughout the Western United States and the rest of the country.

=== Timber ===
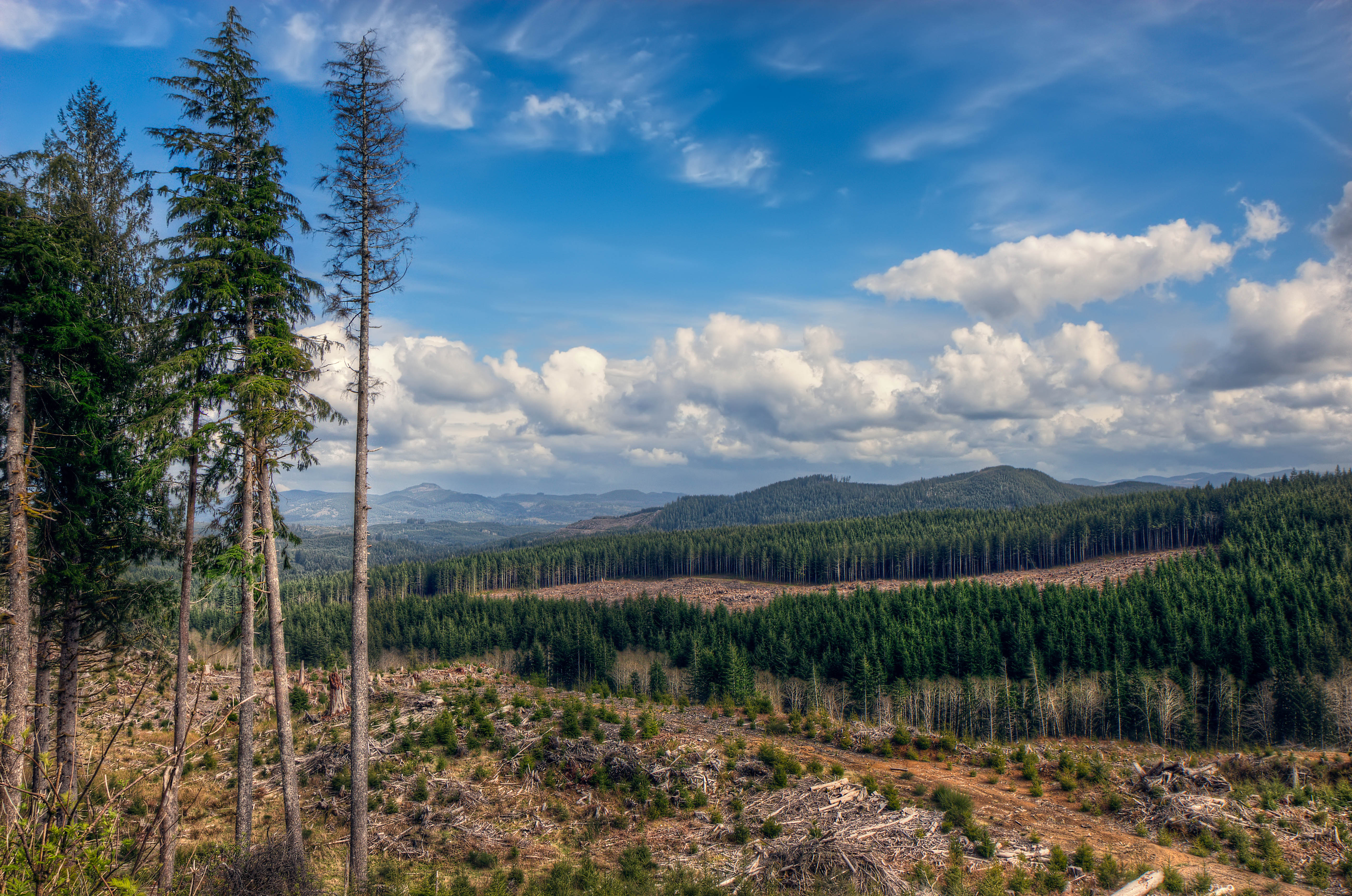
Tillamook State Forest

The state of Oregon owns 44% of the land inside the county boundaries, mostly as part of the Tillamook State Forest. The State Forest was created as a result of the 355,000-acre (144,000 ha) Tillamook Burn. The reforested burn is rapidly maturing, and there is local expectation that it will assist in the recovery of the local timber industry. Three lumber mills currently operate in Tillamook County—one at Garibaldi, one in Tillamook, and one south of Tillamook at the former Naval Air Station.

=== Tourism ===
The county's scenic coastline, which includes four bays, nine rivers and the Pacific Ocean, helps draw visitors to the county for outdoor recreation, agritourism, and cultural experiences. U.S. Route 101, travels the length of the Oregon Coast, and brings many travelers through the county by car, recreational vehicle and bike. The coast also provides locations for vacation homes for inhabitants of nearby Portland and the Willamette Valley. According to the 2015 Dean Runyan Travel Impacts study, tourism brings $229.4 million in visitor spending to Tillamook County.

=== Fishing ===
Fishing is a very important part of the economy. Oysters are farmed in the bay and keep the bay fairly clean. Sport fishing makes up most of the rest. With nine rivers, salmon is the biggest with nearly recovered runs as salmon had to be given away to the food bank. Tillamook County is the first in the continental United States to be declared ready for a tsunami. This designation was given by the National Oceanic and Atmospheric Administration after the county paid $15,000 for 27 warning sirens and an emergency radio system. In 2012, county leaders voted to deactivate most of the sirens, in favor of more modern methods. With effort from local residents, the communities of Garibaldi and Rockaway Beach retained their sirens, which will be activated locally.

== Politics ==
In its early history, Tillamook was a powerfully Republican county. It voted for the Republican presidential candidate in every election from Oregon statehood until 1928, even supporting William Howard Taft in 1912, when the party was divided. Since Franklin Roosevelt became the first Democrat to carry the county in 1932, Tillamook has been a bellwether county in most presidential elections, although it did vote for losing Democrats in 1968, 1980, and 1988. Tillamook County has remained quite competitive over the last half-century. Since 1968, no candidate has received over 55 percent of the vote, with the highest being Michael Dukakis in 1988. From 1992 until 2016, it voted for the winning presidential candidate; that streak ended in 2020 with its vote for Donald Trump, although he won the county with a reduced margin from 2016. Trump carried Tillamook County for a third time in 2024, but again with a reduced margin from 2020; in doing so, it was one of three "pivot counties", or counties that voted for Barack Obama twice and Trump three times, to shift leftward from 2020, the others being Grays Harbor County and Mason County, both of Washington state.

Tillamook County is also a relatively swingy county at the local level, generally following its federal trends of voting predominantly Democratic, with some exceptions. In recent years, it has swung back to Republicans, with John Kitzhaber being the last Democrat to win it in 2014.

In 2019, Tillamook County passed a Second Amendment Sanctuary Ordinance to counter the more liberal gun laws of Oregon at-large, stating that any laws which restrict the right to own firearms "shall not be enforced by Tillamook County agents."

United States presidential election results for Tillamook County, Oregon
Year	Republican		Democratic		Third party(ies)	
Year	No.	%	No.	%	No.	%
1904	729	69.49%	136	12.96%	184	17.54%
1908	641	60.13%	253	23.73%	172	16.14%
1912	496	33.56%	411	27.81%	571	38.63%
1916	1,547	53.86%	1,175	40.91%	150	5.22%
1920	1,664	60.80%	828	30.25%	245	8.95%
1924	2,201	59.18%	795	21.38%	723	19.44%
1928	2,570	66.75%	1,204	31.27%	76	1.97%
1932	1,722	36.21%	2,726	57.33%	307	6.46%
1936	1,380	30.11%	2,781	60.68%	422	9.21%
1940	2,516	47.13%	2,786	52.19%	36	0.67%
1944	2,477	47.76%	2,634	50.79%	75	1.45%
1948	2,952	46.96%	3,128	49.76%	206	3.28%
1952	4,931	58.97%	3,401	40.67%	30	0.36%
1956	4,306	53.89%	3,684	46.11%	0	0.00%
1960	3,935	48.92%	4,098	50.94%	11	0.14%
1964	2,318	30.61%	5,246	69.27%	9	0.12%
1968	3,261	44.73%	3,609	49.50%	421	5.77%
1972	4,120	51.22%	3,544	44.06%	380	4.72%
1976	4,033	45.48%	4,456	50.25%	378	4.26%
1980	4,123	41.63%	4,521	45.65%	1,259	12.71%
1984	5,267	51.10%	4,988	48.39%	53	0.51%
1988	4,297	42.67%	5,529	54.91%	244	2.42%
1992	3,359	29.25%	5,040	43.89%	3,085	26.86%
1996	3,884	34.27%	5,775	50.96%	1,673	14.76%
2000	5,775	46.66%	5,762	46.56%	839	6.78%
2004	7,003	50.20%	6,750	48.38%	198	1.42%
2008	5,757	43.30%	7,072	53.18%	468	3.52%
2012	5,684	45.40%	6,293	50.27%	542	4.33%
2016	6,538	47.37%	5,768	41.79%	1,497	10.85%
2020	8,354	49.47%	8,066	47.76%	468	2.77%
2024	7,971	49.05%	7,747	47.67%	534	3.29%

== Transportation ==
- Tillamook County Transportation District

== Communities ==
=== Cities ===
- Bay City
- Garibaldi
- Manzanita
- Nehalem
- Rockaway Beach
- Tillamook (county seat)
- Wheeler

=== Census-designated places ===
- Barnesdale
- Bayside Gardens
- Beaver
- Cape Meares
- Cloverdale
- Fairview
- Hebo
- Idaville
- Neahkahnie
- Neskowin
- Netarts
- Oceanside
- Pacific City
- Pleasant Valley

=== Other unincorporated communities ===
- Aldervale
- Barview
- Bayocean
- Brighton
- Castle Rock
- Dolph
- Foss
- Hemlock
- Hobsonville
- Idiotville
- Jordan Creek
- Lees Camp
- Manhattan Beach
- Meda
- Mohler
- Nedonna Beach
- Oretown
- Sandlake
- Tierra Del Mar
- Twin Rocks
- Watseco
- Woods

== Education ==
School districts include:

- Neah-Kah-Nie School District 56
- Nestucca Valley School District 101J
- Tillamook School District 9
- Willamina School District 30J

The county is in the Tillamook Bay Community College district.

== Notable people ==
- Dennis Awtrey, former National Basketball Association player
- Nellie Owens (Little House on the Prairie's Nellie Oleson's archetype), lived and got married here

== In popular culture ==
Tillamook County served as the setting for the fictional town of Elk Cove in the 1987 comedy film Overboard starring Goldie Hawn and Kurt Russell.

Todd Snider released Tillamook County Jail on his 2004 album East Nashville Skyline.

Tillamook County is the location of the fictional town of Arcadia Bay in the 2015 video game Life is Strange and its 2017 prequel Before the Storm.

== See also ==
- National Register of Historic Places listings in Tillamook County, Oregon
