= 2012 United States presidential election in Oregon =

- November 6, 2012

Nominee	Barack Obama	Mitt Romney
Party	Democratic	Republican
Home state	Illinois	Massachusetts
Running mate	Joe Biden	Paul Ryan
Electoral vote	7	0
Popular vote	970,488	754,175
Percentage	54.24%	42.15%

Obama
50–60%
60–70%
70–80%
Romney
40–50%
50–60%
60–70%
70–80%
President before election
Barack Obama
Democratic
Elected President
Barack Obama
Democratic

The 2012 United States presidential election in Oregon took place on November 6, 2012, as part of the 2012 United States presidential election in which all 50 states plus the District of Columbia participated. Oregon voters chose seven electors to represent them in the Electoral College via a popular vote pitting incumbent Democratic President Barack Obama and his running mate, Vice President Joe Biden, against Republican challenger and former Massachusetts Governor Mitt Romney and his running mate, Representative Paul Ryan.

Obama carried Oregon with 54.24% of the vote to Romney's 42.15%, a Democratic victory margin of 12.09%. The Democrats have won the state in every presidential election since 1988, and the Republicans would never seriously contest the state after the 2004 election. Though Romney won a majority of counties, his best performances were in the most sparsely populated regions of the state. Obama's win came from strong support in the densely populated northwestern region of the state, home to Oregon's largest metropolitan areas. Obama won over 75% of the vote in Multnomah County, containing Portland, as well as its surrounding counties, enough to deliver the state to the Democrats by a strong margin. However, the Republican Party managed to improve on their 2008 loss of 16.35% and flipped the counties of Jackson (home to Medford), Marion (home to Salem), and Wasco back into the Republican column.

Obama was the first Democrat since 1948 to win without Wasco County. As of the 2024 presidential election, this is the last time where Columbia County and Tillamook County backed the Democratic candidate.

== Primary elections ==
=== Democratic primary ===
The Democratic primary was held on May 15, 2012. Barack Obama ran unopposed for the nomination.

2012 Oregon Democratic presidential primary
Party	Candidate	Votes	%
Democratic	Barack Obama (incumbent)	309,358	94.79%
Democratic	write-ins	16,998	5.21%
Total votes		326,358	100.00%

=== Republican primary ===
2012 Oregon Republican presidential primary
- May 15, 2012

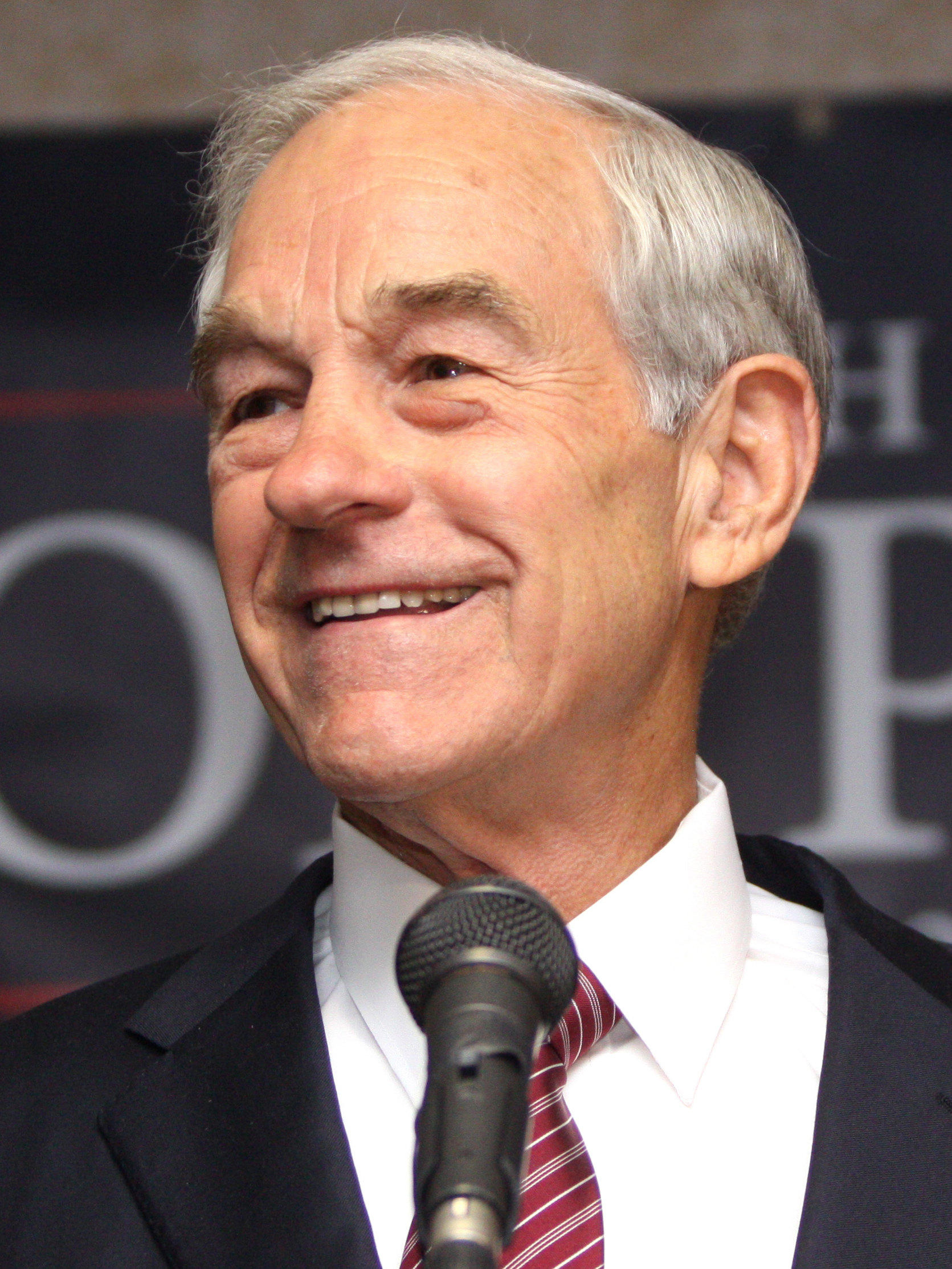

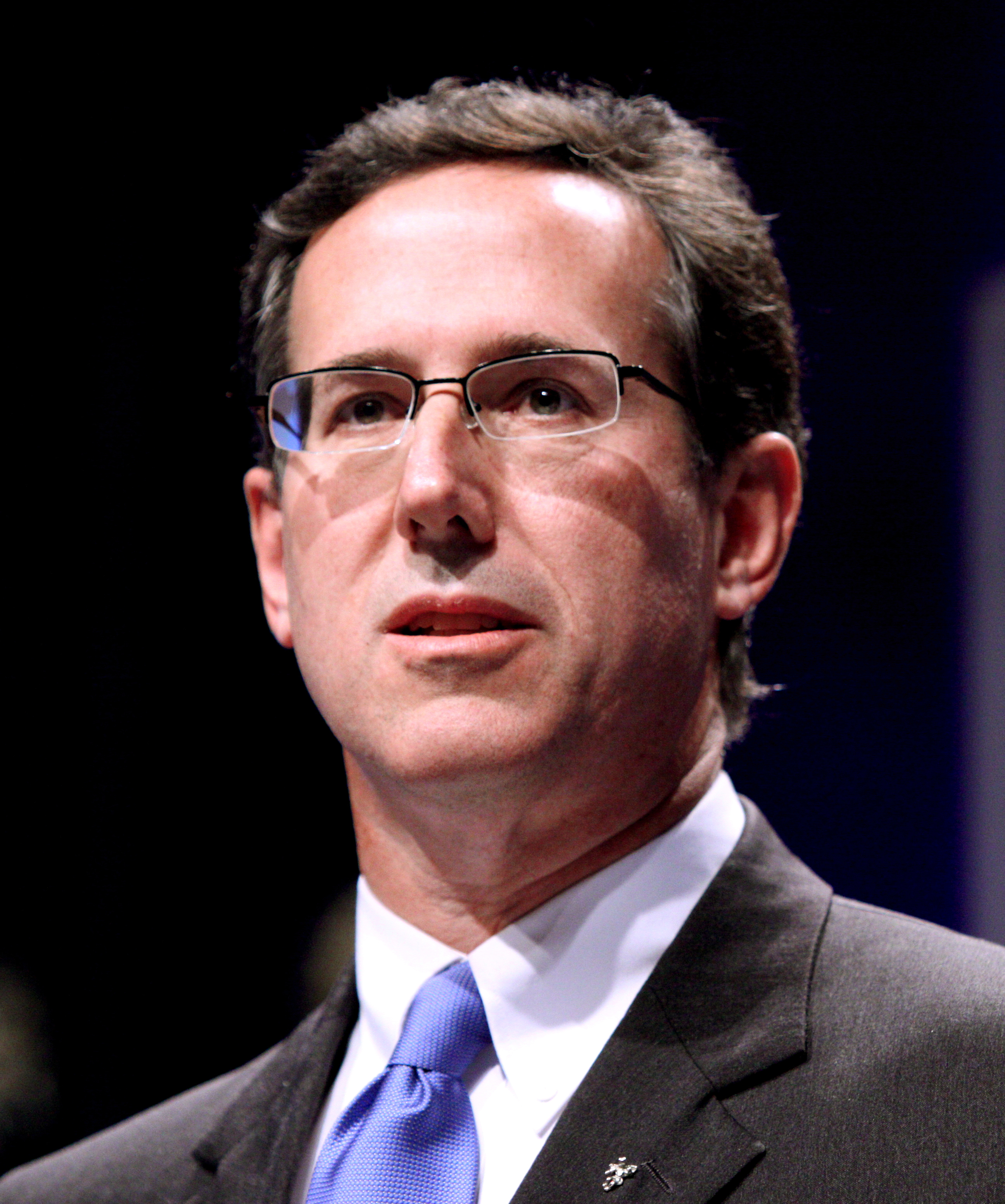

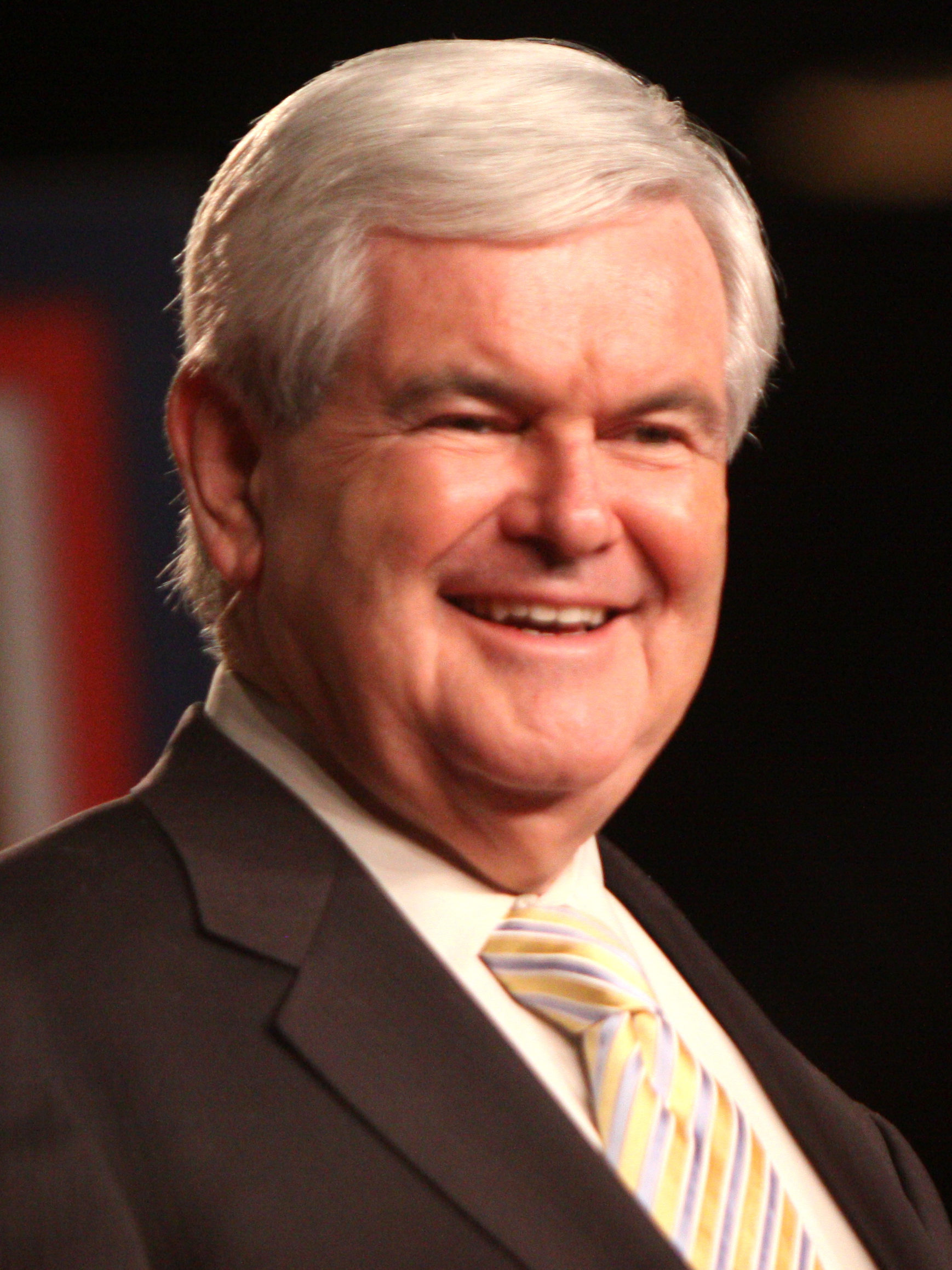
Candidate	Mitt Romney	Ron Paul
Home state	Massachusetts	Texas
Delegate count	18	3
Popular vote	204,176	36,810
Percentage	70.91%	12.78%
Candidate	Rick Santorum	Newt Gingrich
Home state	Pennsylvania	Georgia
Delegate count	3	1
Popular vote	27,042	15,451
Percentage	9.39%	5.37%
- Oregon results by county Mitt Romney (Note: Italicization indicates a withdrawn candidacy)

The Republican primary was held on May 15, 2012. The only two candidates still in the race were Mitt Romney and U.S. Representative from Texas, Ron Paul. In addition, former Senator from Pennsylvania Rick Santorum and former Speaker of the House Newt Gingrich had withdrawn prior to the election, but their names still appeared on the Oregon ballot.

In order to participate in the primary, voters were required to register to vote by April 24, 2012. A closed primary was used to elect the presidential, legislative, and local partisan offices. A semi-closed primary, which allowed non-affiliated voters to participate, was used to elect the Attorney General, Secretary of State and Treasurer.

2012 Oregon Republican presidential primary
Party	Candidate	Votes	%
Republican	Mitt Romney	204,176	70.91%
Republican	Ron Paul	36,810	12.78%
Republican	Rick Santorum (withdrew)	27,042	9.39%
Republican	Newt Gingrich (withdrew)	15,451	5.37%
Republican	write-ins	4,476	1.55%
Total votes		287,955	100.00%

== General election ==
=== Predictions ===
Source	Ranking	As of
Huffington Post	Safe D	November 6, 2012
CNN	Safe D	November 6, 2012
New York Times	Safe D	November 6, 2012
Washington Post	Safe D	November 6, 2012
RealClearPolitics	Lean D	November 6, 2012
Sabato's Crystal Ball	Likely D	November 5, 2012
FiveThirtyEight	Solid D	November 6, 2012

=== Results ===
2012 United States presidential election in Oregon
Party	Candidate	Votes	%
Democratic	Barack Obama (incumbent)	970,488	54.24%
Republican	Mitt Romney	754,175	42.15%
Libertarian	Gary Johnson	24,089	1.35%
Pacific Green	Jill Stein	19,427	1.09%
Constitution	Will Christensen	4,432	0.25%
Progressive	Rocky Anderson	3,384	0.19%
	write-ins	13,275	0.74%
Total votes		1,789,270	100.00%

==== By county ====
County	Barack Obama Democratic		Mitt Romney Republican		Various candidates Other parties		Margin		Total votes cast
County	#	%	#	%	#	%	#	%	Total votes cast
Baker	2,369	28.04%	5,702	67.50%	377	4.46%	-3,333	-39.46%	8,448
Benton	27,776	62.00%	14,991	33.46%	2,035	4.54%	12,785	28.54%	44,802
Clackamas	95,493	50.44%	88,592	46.79%	5,247	2.77%	6,901	3.65%	189,332
Clatsop	9,861	55.34%	7,249	40.68%	708	3.98%	2,612	14.66%	17,818
Columbia	12,004	50.28%	10,772	45.12%	1,099	4.60%	1,232	5.16%	23,875
Coos	12,845	44.78%	14,673	51.15%	1,168	4.07%	-1,828	-6.37%	28,686
Crook	3,104	30.34%	6,790	66.37%	336	3.29%	-3,686	-36.03%	10,230
Curry	4,625	39.60%	6,598	56.50%	455	3.90%	-1,973	-16.90%	11,678
Deschutes	36,961	45.13%	42,463	51.85%	2,476	3.02%	-5,502	-6.72%	81,900
Douglas	17,145	34.43%	30,776	61.80%	1,882	3.77%	-13,631	-27.37%	49,803
Gilliam	371	34.97%	639	60.23%	51	4.80%	-268	-25.26%	1,061
Grant	853	21.81%	2,926	74.81%	132	3.38%	-2,073	-53.00%	3,911
Harney	832	23.22%	2,607	72.76%	144	4.02%	-1,775	-49.54%	3,583
Hood River	6,058	61.58%	3,429	34.85%	351	3.57%	2,629	26.73%	9,838
Jackson	44,468	45.78%	49,020	50.47%	3,639	3.75%	-4,552	-4.69%	97,127
Jefferson	3,301	40.38%	4,642	56.78%	232	2.84%	-1,341	-16.40%	8,175
Josephine	14,953	37.16%	23,673	58.83%	1,612	4.01%	-8,720	-21.67%	40,238
Klamath	8,302	29.49%	18,898	67.13%	952	3.38%	-10,596	-37.64%	28,152
Lake	770	20.75%	2,808	75.69%	132	3.56%	-2,038	-54.94%	3,710
Lane	102,652	59.73%	62,509	36.37%	6,689	3.90%	40,143	23.36%	171,850
Lincoln	13,401	58.31%	8,686	37.79%	897	3.90%	4,715	20.52%	22,984
Linn	20,378	39.63%	28,944	56.28%	2,104	4.09%	-8,566	-16.65%	51,426
Malheur	2,759	27.71%	6,851	68.81%	346	3.48%	-4,092	-41.10%	9,956
Marion	56,376	46.83%	60,190	50.00%	3,810	3.17%	-3,814	-3.17%	120,376
Morrow	1,202	30.96%	2,532	65.22%	148	3.82%	-1,330	-34.26%	3,882
Multnomah	274,887	75.37%	75,302	20.65%	14,533	3.98%	199,585	54.72%	364,722
Polk	16,292	46.21%	17,819	50.54%	1,146	3.25%	-1,527	-4.33%	35,257
Sherman	319	31.09%	678	66.08%	29	2.83%	-359	-34.99%	1,026
Tillamook	6,293	50.27%	5,684	45.40%	542	4.33%	609	4.87%	12,519
Umatilla	8,584	34.38%	15,499	62.07%	886	3.55%	-6,915	-27.69%	24,969
Union	3,973	32.92%	7,636	63.26%	461	3.82%	-3,663	-30.34%	12,070
Wallowa	1,253	29.80%	2,804	66.68%	148	3.52%	-1,551	-36.88%	4,205
Wasco	5,211	47.93%	5,229	48.09%	433	3.98%	-18	-0.16%	10,873
Washington	135,291	57.08%	93,974	39.65%	7,758	3.27%	41,317	17.43%	237,023
Wheeler	266	31.00%	545	63.52%	47	5.48%	-279	-32.52%	858
Yamhill	19,260	44.89%	22,045	51.38%	1,602	3.73%	-2,785	-6.49%	42,907
Total	970,488	54.24%	754,175	42.15%	64,607	3.61%	216,313	12.09%	1,789,270

Counties that flipped from Democratic to Republican

- Jackson (largest city: Medford)
- Marion (largest city: Salem)
- Wasco (largest city: The Dalles)

==== By congressional district ====
Obama won four of five congressional districts.

District	Obama	Romney	Representative
1st	57.28%	40.01%	Suzanne Bonamici
2nd	40.46%	56.83%	Greg Walden
3rd	72.03%	24.68%	Earl Blumenauer
4th	51.74%	44.98%	Peter DeFazio
5th	50.49%	47.11%	Kurt Schrader

== See also ==
- United States presidential elections in Oregon
- 2012 Republican Party presidential debates and forums
- 2012 Republican Party presidential primaries
- Results of the 2012 Republican Party presidential primaries
- Oregon Republican Party
