= 1984 United States presidential election in Oregon =

- November 6, 1984

Nominee	Ronald Reagan	Walter Mondale
Party	Republican	Democratic
Home state	California	Minnesota
Running mate	George H. W. Bush	Geraldine Ferraro
Electoral vote	7	0
Popular vote	685,700	536,479
Percentage	55.91%	43.74%
County results
Reagan
40–50%
50–60%
60–70%
70–80%
Mondale
40–50%
50–60%
President before election
Ronald Reagan
Republican
Elected President
Ronald Reagan
Republican

The 1984 United States presidential election in Oregon was held on November 6, 1984. All fifty states and the District of Columbia were part of the 1984 United States presidential election. Voters chose seven electors to the Electoral College, which selected the president and vice president of the United States.

Oregon was won by incumbent United States President Ronald Reagan of California, who was running against former Vice President Walter Mondale of Minnesota. Reagan ran for a second time with incumbent Vice President and former C.I.A. Director George H. W. Bush of Texas, and Mondale ran with Representative Geraldine Ferraro of New York, the first major female candidate for the vice presidency. The presidential election of 1984 was a very partisan election for Oregon, with the Democratic or Republican parties the only parties appearing on the ballot. The vast majority of counties turned out for Reagan, including the eastern interior and southwestern Rogue Valley. The only exceptions were Lane County in the central west, which had voted Republican in 1980, and three counties along the lower Columbia River, including Portland's highly populated Multnomah County, which has been a Democratic stronghold since last voting for Republican Richard Nixon in 1960.

== Results ==
1984 United States presidential election in Oregon
Party	Candidate	Votes	Percentage	Electoral votes
Republican	Ronald Reagan (incumbent)	685,700	55.91%	7
Democratic	Walter Mondale	536,479	43.74%	0
Write-Ins		4,348	0.35%	0
Totals		1,226,527	100.0%	7

=== Results by county ===
County	Ronald Reagan Republican		Walter Mondale Democratic		Various candidates Write-ins		Margin		Total votes cast
County	#	%	#	%	#	%	#	%	Total votes cast
Baker	5,204	66.62%	2,591	33.17%	17	0.22%	2,613	33.45%	7,812
Benton	17,836	52.36%	16,073	47.19%	153	0.45%	1,763	5.17%	34,062
Clackamas	68,630	59.08%	47,254	40.68%	289	0.25%	21,376	18.40%	116,173
Clatsop	7,522	49.86%	7,525	49.88%	38	0.25%	-3	-0.02%	15,085
Columbia	7,811	48.50%	8,219	51.03%	75	0.47%	-408	-2.53%	16,105
Coos	13,637	49.88%	13,582	49.68%	120	0.44%	55	0.20%	27,339
Crook	3,773	62.22%	2,268	37.40%	23	0.38%	1,505	24.82%	6,064
Curry	5,363	60.84%	3,423	38.83%	29	0.33%	1,940	22.01%	8,815
Deschutes	19,323	62.20%	11,671	37.57%	72	0.23%	7,652	24.63%	31,066
Douglas	25,243	63.11%	14,609	36.53%	144	0.36%	10,634	26.58%	39,996
Gilliam	700	65.24%	369	34.39%	4	0.37%	331	30.85%	1,073
Grant	2,695	66.69%	1,344	33.26%	2	0.05%	1,351	33.43%	4,041
Harney	2,197	62.56%	1,290	36.73%	25	0.71%	907	25.83%	3,512
Hood River	4,531	59.85%	3,022	39.92%	18	0.24%	1,509	19.93%	7,571
Jackson	37,895	61.76%	23,230	37.86%	234	0.38%	14,665	23.90%	61,359
Jefferson	3,283	62.94%	1,920	36.81%	13	0.25%	1,363	26.13%	5,216
Josephine	19,470	69.38%	8,539	30.43%	53	0.19%	10,931	38.95%	28,062
Klamath	17,686	69.81%	7,575	29.90%	74	0.29%	10,111	39.91%	25,335
Lake	2,466	67.51%	1,184	32.41%	3	0.08%	1,282	35.10%	3,653
Lane	61,493	48.86%	63,999	50.85%	360	0.29%	-2,506	-1.99%	125,852
Lincoln	9,110	51.17%	8,637	48.51%	57	0.32%	473	2.66%	17,804
Linn	23,463	59.10%	16,161	40.71%	75	0.19%	7,302	18.39%	39,699
Malheur	8,441	76.24%	2,611	23.58%	19	0.17%	5,830	52.66%	11,071
Marion	54,535	59.79%	36,440	39.95%	234	0.26%	18,095	19.84%	91,209
Morrow	2,130	62.70%	1,254	36.91%	13	0.38%	876	25.79%	3,397
Multnomah	119,932	45.17%	144,179	54.30%	1,428	0.54%	-24,247	-9.13%	265,539
Polk	12,678	59.15%	8,709	40.64%	45	0.21%	3,969	18.51%	21,432
Sherman	828	67.48%	398	32.44%	1	0.08%	430	35.04%	1,227
Tillamook	5,267	51.10%	4,988	48.39%	53	0.51%	279	2.71%	10,308
Umatilla	14,211	63.12%	8,246	36.63%	57	0.25%	5,965	26.49%	22,514
Union	6,645	61.36%	4,134	38.18%	50	0.46%	2,511	23.18%	10,829
Wallowa	2,619	68.36%	1,204	31.43%	8	0.21%	1,415	36.93%	3,831
Wasco	6,905	55.36%	5,526	44.31%	41	0.33%	1,379	11.05%	12,472
Washington	75,877	62.76%	44,602	36.89%	417	0.34%	31,275	25.87%	120,896
Wheeler	504	66.58%	253	33.42%			251	33.16%	757
Yamhill	15,797	62.31%	9,450	37.28%	104	0.41%	6,347	25.03%	25,351
Totals	685,700	55.91%	536,479	43.74%	4,348	0.35%	149,221	12.17%	1,226,527

==== Counties that flipped from Democratic to Republican ====
- Tillamook

==== Counties that flipped from Republican to Democratic ====
- Lane

== Analysis ==
Oregon weighed in for this election as 3% more Democratic than the national average. As of the 2024 presidential election, it is the last time Oregon has voted for a Republican in a presidential election, and also the last time Lincoln County, Benton County and Hood River County have voted for a Republican presidential nominee. It also marks the last time any presidential candidate won Oregon while carrying the majority of its counties. Lane County was among a handful of counties nationwide that flipped against Reagan after voting for him in 1980. (Note: Along with Keweenaw County, Michigan, Marin County, California, Santa Cruz County, California, Tompkins County, New York, Arlington County, Virginia, and Alexandria, Virginia)

== See also ==
- United States presidential elections in Oregon
- Presidency of Ronald Reagan
