= 1988 United States presidential election in Oregon =

- November 8, 1988

Nominee	Michael Dukakis	George H. W. Bush
Party	Democratic	Republican
Home state	Massachusetts	Texas
Running mate	Lloyd Bentsen	Dan Quayle
Electoral vote	7	0
Popular vote	616,206	560,126
Percentage	51.28%	46.61%
County results
Dukakis
40–50%
50–60%
60–70%
Bush
40–50%
50–60%
60–70%
President before election
Ronald Reagan
Republican
Elected President
George H. W. Bush
Republican

The 1988 United States presidential election in Oregon took place on November 8, 1988, as part of the 1988 United States presidential election. Voters chose seven electors of the Electoral College, who voted for president and vice president.

Oregon was won by the Democratic nominee, Massachusetts governor Michael Dukakis, over the Republican nominee, Vice President George H. W. Bush. Oregon was one of just ten states won by Dukakis in an election overwhelmingly won by Bush. It also marked the first victory by a Democratic presidential candidate in Oregon since 1964; Democrats have won every presidential election in Oregon since then, although Bush's son and later Republican candidate George W. Bush came extremely close to winning the state in 2000 and only lost it by a somewhat slender margin in 2004. Bush's loss marked the first time that a Republican was elected president while losing Oregon since Ulysses S. Grant in 1868.

As of the 2024 presidential election, this is the last occasion Washington County has voted for a Republican presidential nominee, the only time since 1948 where Oregon has not voted for the same candidate as neighboring California, and the last time that Oregon voted to the left of both California and neighboring Washington.

== Results ==
1988 United States presidential election in Oregon
Party	Candidate	Votes	Percentage	Electoral votes
Democratic	Michael Dukakis	616,206	51.28%	7
Republican	George H. W. Bush	560,126	46.61%	0
Libertarian	Ron Paul	14,811	1.23%	0
Independent	Lenora Fulani	6,487	0.54%	0
No party	Write-in	3,974	0.33%	0
No party	David Duke (write-in)	90	0.01%	0
Voter turnout (Voting age/Registered voters)		59%/79%		

=== Results by county ===
County	Michael Dukakis Democratic		George H. W. Bush Republican		Ron Paul Libertarian		Lenora Fulani Independent		Various candidates Other parties		Margin		Total votes cast
County	#	%	#	%	#	%	#	%	#	%	#	%	Total votes cast
Baker	2,896	42.43%	3,696	54.15%	150	2.20%	56	0.82%	28	0.41%	-800	-11.72%	6,826
Benton	16,930	53.56%	14,004	44.30%	427	1.35%	170	0.54%	79	0.25%	2,926	9.26%	31,610
Clackamas	59,799	48.48%	61,381	49.76%	1,341	1.09%	525	0.43%	305	0.25%	-1,582	-1.28%	123,351
Clatsop	8,074	56.40%	5,956	41.60%	152	1.06%	98	0.68%	36	0.25%	2,118	14.80%	14,316
Columbia	8,983	56.83%	6,424	40.64%	217	1.37%	79	0.50%	103	0.65%	2,559	16.19%	15,806
Coos	13,996	56.35%	10,153	40.88%	365	1.47%	160	0.64%	162	0.65%	3,843	15.47%	24,836
Crook	2,719	46.23%	3,049	51.84%	76	1.29%	35	0.60%	3	0.05%	-330	-5.61%	5,882
Curry	4,015	44.55%	4,761	52.83%	151	1.68%	69	0.77%	16	0.18%	-746	-8.28%	9,012
Deschutes	14,264	45.48%	16,425	52.37%	399	1.27%	155	0.49%	123	0.39%	-2,161	-6.89%	31,366
Douglas	17,255	44.92%	20,120	52.38%	705	1.84%	258	0.67%	77	0.20%	-2,865	-7.46%	38,415
Gilliam	417	46.49%	470	52.40%	5	0.56%	5	0.56%	0	0.00%	-53	-5.91%	897
Grant	1,437	37.38%	2,264	58.90%	100	2.60%	39	1.01%	4	0.10%	-827	-21.52%	3,844
Harney	1,379	41.41%	1,833	55.05%	73	2.19%	30	0.90%	15	0.45%	-454	-13.64%	3,330
Hood River	3,275	48.96%	3,257	48.69%	105	1.57%	40	0.60%	12	0.18%	18	0.27%	6,689
Jackson	28,028	45.27%	32,516	52.52%	878	1.42%	323	0.52%	167	0.27%	-4,488	-7.25%	61,912
Jefferson	2,346	46.97%	2,509	50.23%	78	1.56%	55	1.10%	7	0.14%	-163	-3.26%	4,995
Josephine	10,646	39.04%	15,876	58.21%	530	1.94%	144	0.53%	76	0.28%	-5,230	-19.17%	27,272
Klamath	8,429	37.51%	13,484	60.01%	381	1.70%	171	0.76%	5	0.02%	-5,055	-22.50%	22,470
Lake	1,237	35.72%	2,161	62.40%	47	1.36%	16	0.46%	2	0.06%	-924	-26.68%	3,463
Lane	69,883	58.38%	47,563	39.73%	1,333	1.11%	620	0.52%	303	0.25%	22,320	18.65%	119,702
Lincoln	9,598	55.02%	7,364	42.22%	315	1.81%	118	0.68%	48	0.28%	2,234	12.80%	17,443
Linn	17,007	47.08%	18,312	50.69%	477	1.32%	247	0.68%	79	0.22%	-1,305	-3.61%	36,122
Malheur	2,965	31.40%	6,285	66.56%	127	1.34%	33	0.35%	33	0.35%	-3,320	-35.16%	9,443
Marion	41,193	46.55%	45,292	51.18%	825	0.93%	415	0.47%	767	0.87%	-4,099	-4.63%	88,492
Morrow	1,375	46.30%	1,529	51.48%	54	1.82%	8	0.27%	4	0.13%	-154	-5.18%	2,970
Multnomah	161,361	61.63%	95,561	36.50%	2,475	0.95%	1,397	0.53%	1,049	0.40%	65,800	25.13%	261,843
Polk	9,626	46.68%	10,553	51.18%	291	1.41%	148	0.72%	3	0.01%	-927	-4.50%	20,621
Sherman	435	42.81%	555	54.63%	16	1.57%	9	0.89%	1	0.10%	-120	-11.82%	1,016
Tillamook	5,529	54.91%	4,297	42.67%	123	1.22%	77	0.76%	44	0.44%	1,232	12.24%	10,070
Umatilla	8,327	43.87%	10,254	54.02%	274	1.44%	111	0.58%	15	0.08%	-1,927	-10.15%	18,981
Union	4,682	46.40%	5,061	50.16%	269	2.67%	61	0.60%	17	0.17%	-379	-3.76%	10,090
Wallowa	1,425	40.68%	1,993	56.89%	59	1.68%	21	0.60%	5	0.14%	-568	-16.21%	3,503
Wasco	5,141	52.28%	4,462	45.37%	144	1.46%	64	0.65%	23	0.23%	679	6.91%	9,834
Washington	59,837	46.31%	67,018	51.87%	1,402	1.18%	574	0.48%	380	0.32%	-7,181	-5.56%	129,211
Wheeler	274	40.71%	367	54.53%	22	3.27%	9	1.34%	1	0.15%	-93	-13.82%	673
Yamhill	11,423	44.99%	13,321	52.47%	425	1.67%	147	0.58%	72	0.28%	-1,898	-7.48%	25,388
Totals	616,206	51.28%	560,126	46.61%	14,811	1.23%	6,487	0.54%	4,064	0.34%	56,080	4.67%	1,201,694

==== Counties that flipped from Republican to Democratic ====
- Benton
- Coos
- Hood River
- Lincoln
- Tillamook
- Wasco

== See also ==
- United States presidential elections in Oregon
- Presidency of George H. W. Bush
