= 1936 United States presidential election in Oregon =

- November 3, 1936

All 5 Oregon votes to the Electoral College

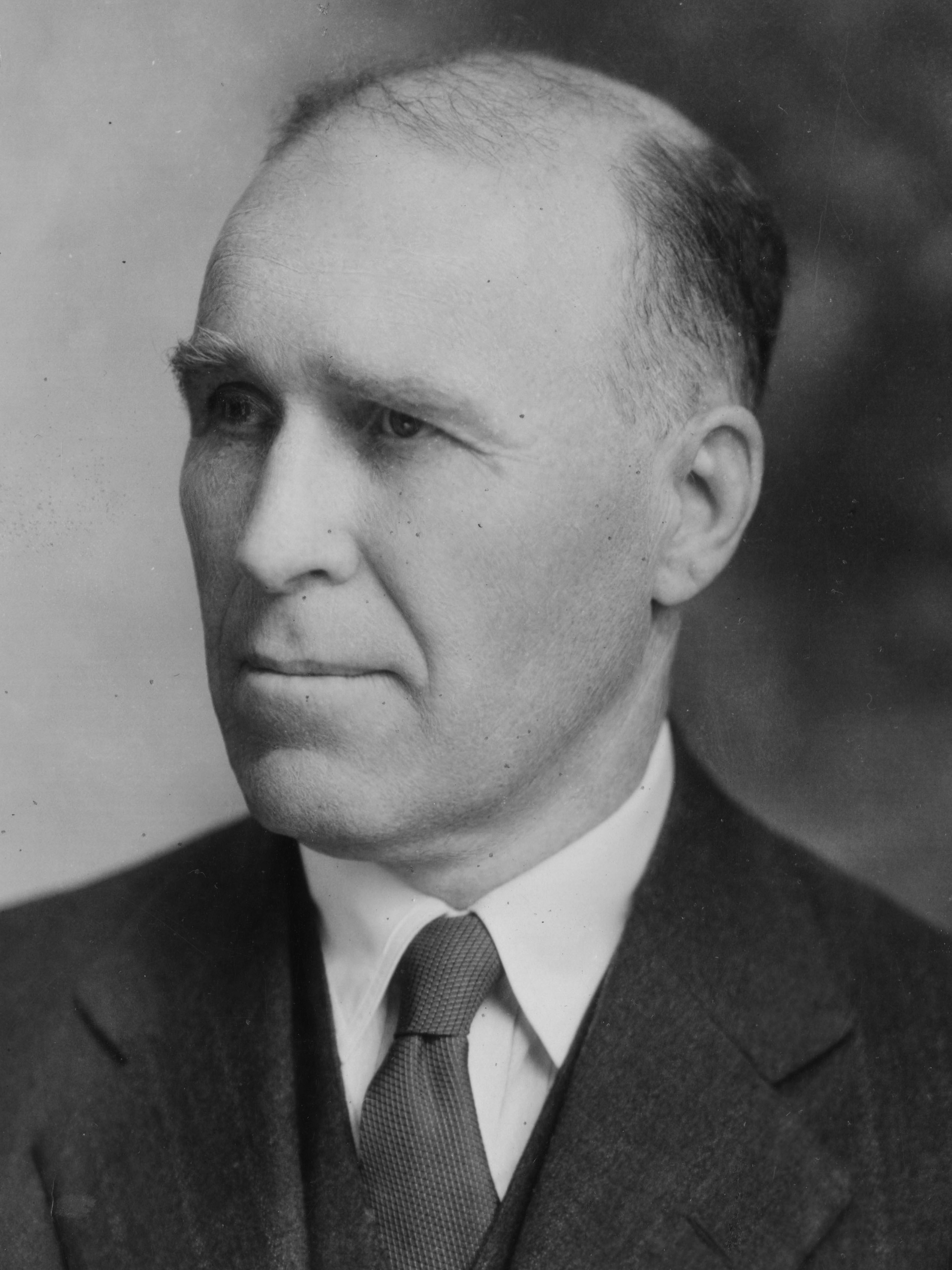
Nominee	Franklin D. Roosevelt	Alf Landon	William Lemke
Party	Democratic	Republican	Independent
Alliance			Union
Home state	New York	Kansas	North Dakota
Running mate	John Nance Garner	Frank Knox	Thomas C. O'Brien
Electoral vote	5	0	0
Popular vote	266,733	122,706	21,831
Percentage	64.42%	29.64%	5.27%
County results
Roosevelt
40–50%
50–60%
60–70%
70–80%
President before election
Franklin D. Roosevelt
Democratic
Elected President
Franklin D. Roosevelt
Democratic

The 1936 United States presidential election in Oregon took place on November 3, 1936, as part of the 1936 United States presidential election. Voters chose five representatives, or electors, to the Electoral College, who voted for president and vice president.

Incumbent President Franklin D. Roosevelt (D–New York), running with Vice President John Nance Garner, won Oregon in a landslide over Governor Alf Landon (R–Kansas) and running mate Frank Knox. Roosevelt took 64.42% of the popular vote to Landon's 29.64%, in what remains the strongest Democratic presidential performance in Oregon history.

Oregon was essentially a one-party Republican state during the Fourth Party System from 1896 to 1928, with the party winning almost every statewide election during the period. However, in 1932, due to massive economic discontent caused by the Great Depression, Franklin D. Roosevelt became the first Democrat since Horatio Seymour in 1868 to win a majority of the state's vote, carrying Oregon by an overwhelming 21 point margin. In 1936, the extremely popular Roosevelt greatly improved upon his 1932 margin, winning Oregon by nearly 35 percentage points. Even amidst a massive Democratic landslide, Oregon weighed in more than 10 points to the left of the nation, a striking departure from its historical status as a Republican stronghold.

Before the election, the primary focus was on power development in the water-rich and mountainous Pacific Northwest, especially the construction of major Federal dams and whether power rates for all users should be uniform. The Republican Party strongly supported private utilities, whilst Democrats generally supported at least some degree of public ownership and control of electric utilities.

As of 2024, Roosevelt remains the only Democrat (and the last candidate of any party) to sweep all of Oregon's counties in a presidential election. Out of FDR's four campaigns for president, this is the only one in which Benton County would support him. Additionally, the 1936 election remains the last in which a Democratic presidential candidate won Josephine County.

== Results ==
1936 United States presidential election in Oregon
Party	Candidate	Votes	%
Democratic	Franklin D. Roosevelt (inc.)	266,733	64.42%
Republican	Alf Landon	122,706	29.64%
Independent	William Lemke	21,831	5.27%
Independent	Norman Thomas	2,143	0.52%
Independent	John W. Aiken	504	0.12%
Write-in	Earl Browder	104	0.03%
Write-in	D. Leigh Colvin	4	0.00%
Total votes		414,021	100%

=== Results by county ===
County	Franklin D. Roosevelt Democratic		Alf Landon Republican		William Lemke Independent		Various candidates Other parties		Margin		Total votes cast
County	#	%	#	%	#	%	#	%	#	%	Total votes cast
Baker	4,991	69.79%	1,768	24.72%	362	5.06%	30	0.42%	3,223	45.07%	7,151
Benton	3,547	47.78%	3,390	45.67%	446	6.01%	40	0.54%	157	2.12%	7,423
Clackamas	14,203	66.67%	5,830	27.37%	1,114	5.23%	156	0.73%	8,373	39.30%	21,303
Clatsop	6,267	70.96%	2,261	25.60%	257	2.91%	47	0.53%	4,006	45.36%	8,832
Columbia	5,587	71.62%	1,815	23.27%	356	4.56%	43	0.55%	3,772	48.35%	7,801
Coos	7,167	67.42%	2,576	24.23%	834	7.85%	53	0.50%	4,591	43.19%	10,630
Crook	1,086	61.99%	589	33.62%	71	4.05%	6	0.34%	497	28.37%	1,752
Curry	913	54.35%	497	29.58%	247	14.70%	23	1.37%	416	24.76%	1,680
Deschutes	4,278	72.71%	1,299	22.08%	257	4.37%	50	0.85%	2,979	50.63%	5,884
Douglas	4,893	48.40%	4,254	42.08%	919	9.09%	44	0.44%	639	6.32%	10,110
Gilliam	983	69.67%	362	25.66%	65	4.61%	1	0.07%	621	44.01%	1,411
Grant	1,436	57.69%	697	28.00%	342	13.74%	14	0.56%	739	29.69%	2,489
Harney	1,262	65.05%	546	28.14%	122	6.29%	10	0.52%	716	36.91%	1,940
Hood River	2,759	65.77%	1,249	29.77%	155	3.69%	32	0.76%	1,510	36.00%	4,195
Jackson	7,520	54.05%	4,866	34.97%	1,449	10.41%	79	0.57%	2,654	19.07%	13,914
Jefferson	514	64.01%	253	31.51%	34	4.23%	2	0.25%	261	32.50%	803
Josephine	2,840	47.69%	1,992	33.45%	1,067	17.92%	56	0.94%	848	14.24%	5,955
Klamath	8,562	70.05%	3,225	26.39%	369	3.02%	66	0.54%	5,337	43.67%	12,222
Lake	1,274	56.55%	725	32.18%	247	10.96%	7	0.31%	549	24.37%	2,253
Lane	13,926	57.51%	8,309	34.31%	1,704	7.04%	276	1.14%	5,617	23.20%	24,215
Lincoln	3,024	59.98%	1,585	31.44%	401	7.95%	32	0.63%	1,439	28.54%	5,042
Linn	5,856	52.23%	4,110	36.66%	1,175	10.48%	70	0.62%	1,746	15.57%	11,211
Malheur	2,630	59.64%	1,385	31.41%	365	8.28%	30	0.68%	1,245	28.23%	4,410
Marion	15,536	59.59%	8,595	32.97%	1,710	6.56%	230	0.88%	6,941	26.62%	26,071
Morrow	1,181	63.02%	518	27.64%	161	8.59%	14	0.75%	663	35.38%	1,874
Multnomah	106,561	69.96%	41,405	27.18%	3,358	2.20%	995	0.65%	65,156	42.78%	152,319
Polk	3,694	56.85%	2,246	34.56%	514	7.91%	44	0.68%	1,448	22.28%	6,498
Sherman	823	67.85%	337	27.78%	50	4.12%	3	0.25%	486	40.07%	1,213
Tillamook	2,781	60.68%	1,380	30.11%	399	8.71%	23	0.50%	1,401	30.57%	4,583
Umatilla	5,753	61.13%	2,943	31.27%	676	7.18%	39	0.41%	2,810	29.86%	9,411
Union	4,643	69.17%	1,517	22.60%	520	7.75%	32	0.48%	3,126	46.57%	6,712
Wallowa	2,000	63.86%	811	25.89%	295	9.42%	26	0.83%	1,189	37.96%	3,132
Wasco	3,573	68.92%	1,278	24.65%	318	6.13%	15	0.29%	2,295	44.27%	5,184
Washington	8,641	63.48%	4,148	30.47%	721	5.30%	102	0.75%	4,493	33.01%	13,612
Wheeler	663	55.71%	502	42.18%	22	1.85%	3	0.25%	161	13.53%	1,190
Yamhill	5,366	55.92%	3,443	35.88%	729	7.60%	58	0.60%	1,923	20.04%	9,596
Totals	266,733	64.55%	122,706	29.69%	21,831	5.11%	2,751	0.65%	144,027	34.85%	414,021

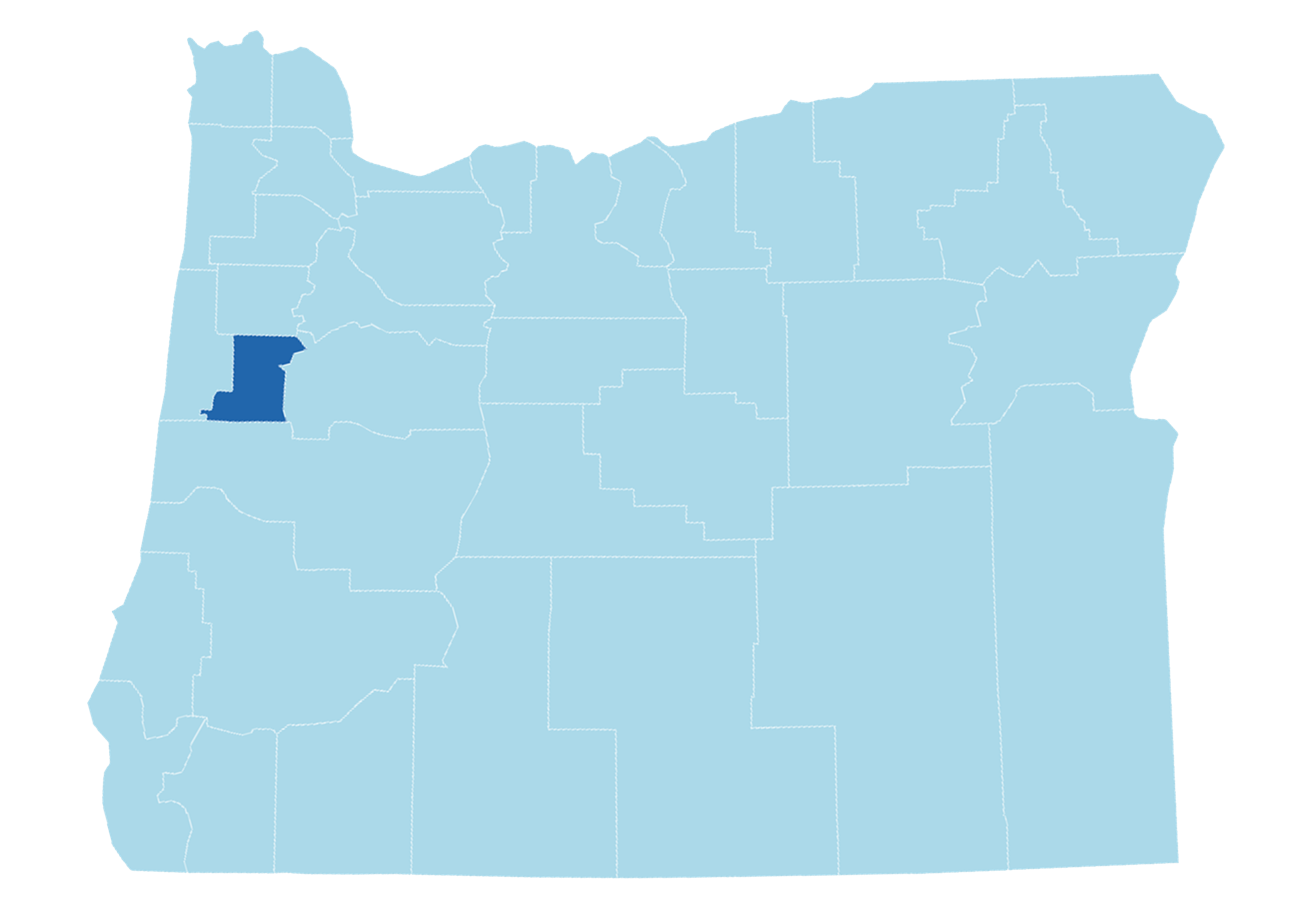
Oregon 32-36 county flips: Democratic Hold Gain from Republican

==== Counties that flipped from Republican to Democratic ====
- Benton

== See also ==
- United States presidential elections in Oregon
