= 1952 United States presidential election in Oregon =

- November 4, 1952

All 6 Oregon votes to the Electoral College

Nominee	Dwight D. Eisenhower	Adlai Stevenson
Party	Republican	Democratic
Home state	New York	Illinois
Running mate	Richard Nixon	John Sparkman
Electoral vote	6	0
Popular vote	420,815	270,579
Percentage	60.54%	38.93%
County results
Eisenhower
50–60%
60–70%
70–80%
Stevenson
50–60%
President before election
Harry S. Truman
Democratic
Elected President
Dwight D. Eisenhower
Republican

The 1952 United States presidential election in Oregon took place on November 4, 1952, as part of the 1952 United States presidential election. Voters chose six representatives, or electors, to the Electoral College, who voted for president and vice president.

Oregon was won by Columbia University President Dwight D. Eisenhower (R–New York), running with California Senator Richard Nixon, with 60.54% of the popular vote, carrying every county in the state except Columbia. The challenger, Adlai Stevenson (D–Illinois), running with Alabama Senator John Sparkman, lost the state with 38.93% of the popular vote. This is the last election in which a Republican would win over 60% of the vote in Oregon. This is also the closest any presidential candidate has come to sweeping all of the state's counties after 1936.

== Results ==
1952 United States presidential election in Oregon
Party	Candidate	Votes	%
Republican	Dwight D. Eisenhower	420,815	60.54%
Democratic	Adlai Stevenson	270,579	38.93%
Independent	Vincent Hallinan	3,665	0.53%
Total votes		695,059	100%

=== Results by county ===
County	Dwight D. Eisenhower Republican		Adlai Stevenson Democratic		Vincent Hallinan Independent		Margin		Total votes cast
County	#	%	#	%	#	%	#	%	Total votes cast
Baker	4,253	62.20%	2,562	37.47%	23	0.34%	1,691	24.73%	6,838
Benton	9,229	75.27%	2,966	24.19%	67	0.55%	6,263	51.08%	12,262
Clackamas	24,174	59.51%	16,219	39.93%	227	0.56%	7,955	19.58%	40,620
Clatsop	7,569	56.02%	5,814	43.03%	128	0.95%	1,755	12.99%	13,511
Columbia	4,666	47.45%	5,096	51.82%	72	0.73%	-430	-4.37%	9,834
Coos	10,122	55.04%	8,118	44.15%	149	0.81%	2,004	10.89%	18,389
Crook	2,124	57.70%	1,490	40.48%	67	1.82%	634	17.22%	3,681
Curry	2,147	67.54%	1,005	31.61%	27	0.85%	1,142	35.93%	3,179
Deschutes	5,776	64.28%	3,174	35.32%	36	0.40%	2,602	28.96%	8,986
Douglas	14,109	64.11%	7,837	35.61%	63	0.29%	6,272	28.50%	22,009
Gilliam	911	68.55%	415	31.23%	3	0.23%	496	37.32%	1,329
Grant	1,941	61.66%	1,190	37.80%	17	0.54%	751	23.86%	3,148
Harney	1,378	58.24%	983	41.55%	5	0.21%	395	16.69%	2,366
Hood River	3,310	62.84%	1,930	36.64%	27	0.51%	1,380	26.20%	5,267
Jackson	18,279	67.55%	8,674	32.05%	107	0.40%	9,605	35.50%	27,060
Jefferson	1,488	67.12%	723	32.61%	6	0.27%	765	34.51%	2,217
Josephine	8,200	70.36%	3,353	28.77%	102	0.88%	4,847	41.59%	11,655
Klamath	11,517	64.02%	6,407	35.62%	65	0.36%	5,110	28.40%	17,989
Lake	1,727	58.68%	1,205	40.94%	11	0.37%	522	17.74%	2,943
Lane	35,693	63.83%	19,960	35.69%	266	0.48%	15,733	28.14%	55,919
Lincoln	5,559	60.08%	3,632	39.26%	61	0.66%	1,927	20.82%	9,252
Linn	13,761	62.67%	8,058	36.70%	140	0.64%	5,703	25.97%	21,959
Malheur	5,414	70.45%	2,245	29.21%	26	0.34%	3,169	41.24%	7,685
Marion	29,887	70.41%	12,337	29.06%	224	0.53%	17,550	41.35%	42,448
Morrow	1,254	61.32%	786	38.44%	5	0.24%	468	22.88%	2,045
Multnomah	132,602	55.01%	107,118	44.44%	1,339	0.56%	25,484	10.57%	241,059
Polk	6,850	69.41%	2,983	30.23%	36	0.36%	3,867	39.18%	9,869
Sherman	747	67.48%	355	32.07%	5	0.45%	392	35.41%	1,107
Tillamook	4,931	58.97%	3,401	40.67%	30	0.36%	1,530	18.30%	8,362
Umatilla	10,529	59.60%	7,098	40.18%	40	0.23%	3,431	19.42%	17,667
Union	4,114	53.69%	3,526	46.01%	23	0.30%	588	7.68%	7,663
Wallowa	1,891	59.41%	1,271	39.93%	21	0.66%	620	19.48%	3,183
Wasco	4,362	63.09%	2,517	36.40%	35	0.51%	1,845	26.69%	6,914
Washington	20,250	64.11%	11,191	35.43%	143	0.45%	9,059	28.68%	31,584
Wheeler	719	60.52%	468	39.39%	1	0.08%	251	21.13%	1,188
Yamhill	9,332	67.27%	4,472	32.24%	68	0.49%	4,860	35.03%	13,872
Totals	420,815	60.54%	270,579	38.93%	3,665	0.53%	150,236	21.61%	695,059

==== Counties that flipped from Democratic to Republican ====
- Baker
- Clatsop
- Crook
- Deschutes
- Grant
- Harney
- Klamath
- Lake
- Lincoln
- Morrow
- Tillamook
- Umatilla
- Multnomah
- Union
- Wallowa

== See also ==
- United States presidential elections in Oregon
