= 1916 United States presidential election in Oregon =

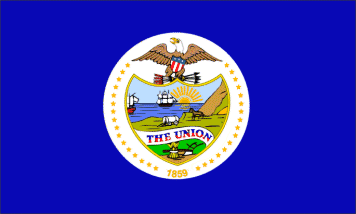
- November 7, 1916
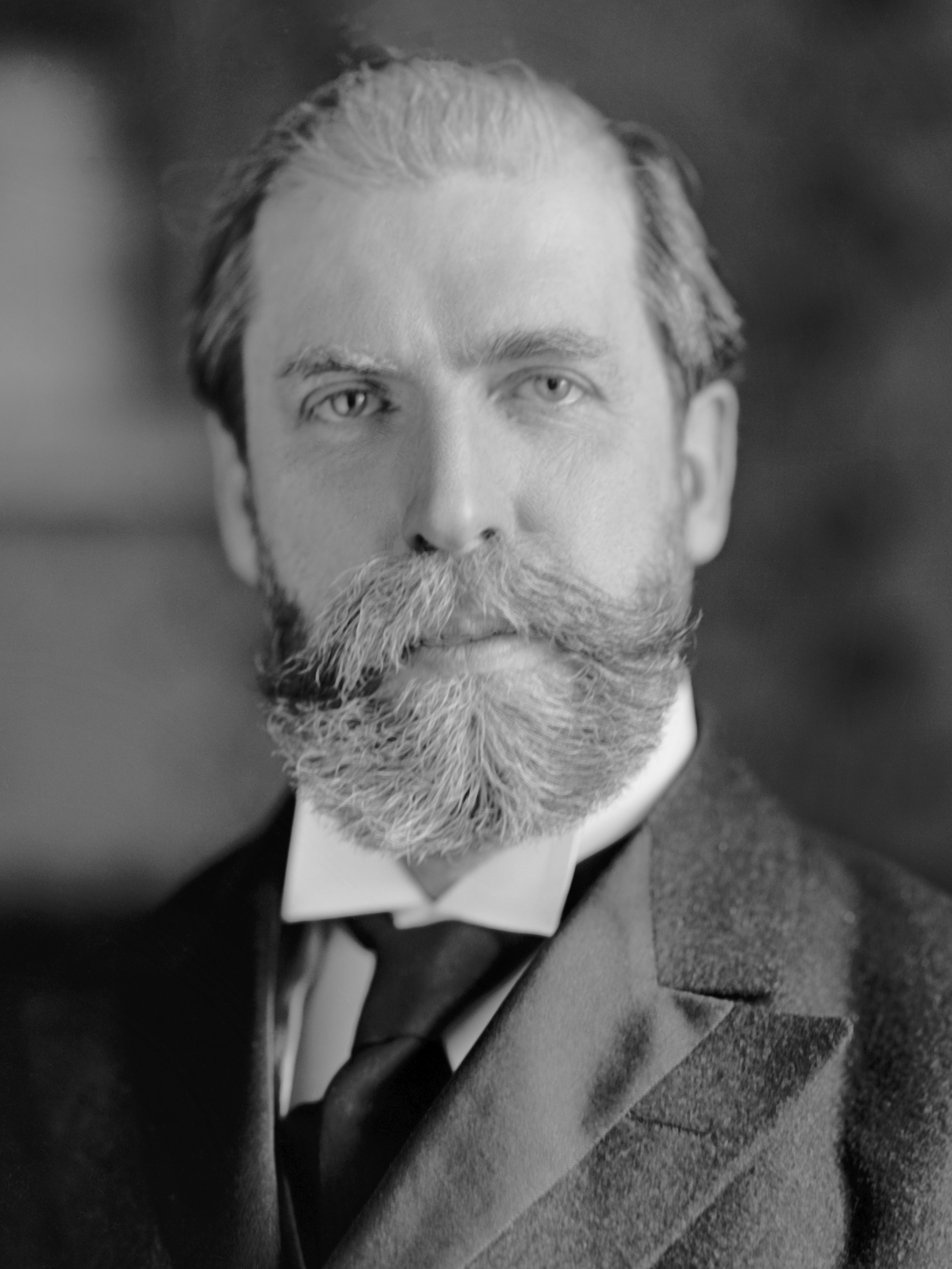

Nominee	Charles Evans Hughes	Woodrow Wilson
Party	Republican	Democratic
Home state	New York	New Jersey
Running mate	Charles W. Fairbanks	Thomas R. Marshall
Electoral vote	5	0
Popular vote	126,813	120,087
Percentage	48.47%	45.90%
County results
Hughes
40–50%
50–60%
Wilson
40–50%
50–60%
President before election
Woodrow Wilson
Democratic
Elected President
Woodrow Wilson
Democratic

The 1916 United States presidential election in Oregon took place on November 7, 1916 as part of the 1916 United States presidential election in which all contemporary forty-eight states participated. Voters chose five electors, or representatives to the Electoral College, who voted for president and vice president.

Oregon had been in the 1900s solidified as a one-party Republican bastion, which it would remain at a Presidential level apart from the 1910s GOP split until Franklin D. Roosevelt rose to power in 1932, and apart from a very short New Deal interlude at state level until the "Revolution of 1954". As of 1916, the state had not elected a Democratic Congressman since 1878, and between 1900 and 1954 Democratic representation in the Oregon legislature would never exceed fifteen percent except during the above-mentioned 1930s interlude, so that Republican primaries would become the chief mode of competition.

In 1912, a split in the Republican Party and the relatively limited appeal of Theodore Roosevelt’s Progressive Party in what was at the time the most Republican of the Pacific States allowed Woodrow Wilson to become only the second Democratic presidential candidate after Horatio Seymour in 1868 to carry Oregon.

For his 1916 re-election against a United GOP, Wilson campaigned on keeping the United States out of World War I, and upon Progressive Era reforms like the income tax. These reforms were much less popular in Yankee-settled Western Oregon – which had close cultural and political ties to New England – with the result that Oregon voted for the Republican nominee, Supreme Court Justice Charles Evans Hughes of New York, over the Democratic nominee, incumbent President Woodrow Wilson of New Jersey. Hughes won Oregon by a close margin of 2.57%; however, alongside South Dakota, Oregon was the only state that Hughes won in the Great Plains or westward. Wilson’s historically based strength in sparsely populated and Ozark mountaineer-settled Eastern Oregon, like that of William Jennings Bryan in 1896, was inadequate to counter this.

== Primary elections ==
These were the first presidential primaries in Oregon in which women had the right to vote. Under Oregon law, a candidate could be placed on a party's primary ballot by petition. Only Woodrow Wilson appeared on the Democratic Party ballot. The Republican Party ballot included Charles Evans Hughes, Albert B. Cummins, and Theodore E. Burton. Primaries for the vice presidential candidates were also held on the same day. On the Democratic ballot, Elliott Woolfolk Major of Missouri and Thomas R. Marshall of Indiana faced off, receiving 5,706 and 21,205 votes, respectively. On the Republican ballot, only William Grant Webster of Illinois appeared, allowing him to receive all 58,076 votes.

=== Democratic Party ===
A primary for the Democratic presidential candidate was held in Oregon on May 19, 1916. Only Woodrow Wilson appeared on the ballot for the Democratic primary, allowing him to receive all 27,898 votes.

=== Republican Party ===
1916 Oregon Republican presidential primary
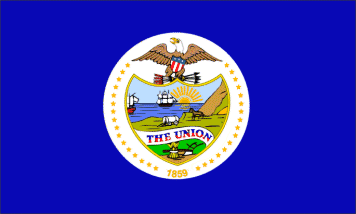
- May 19, 1916
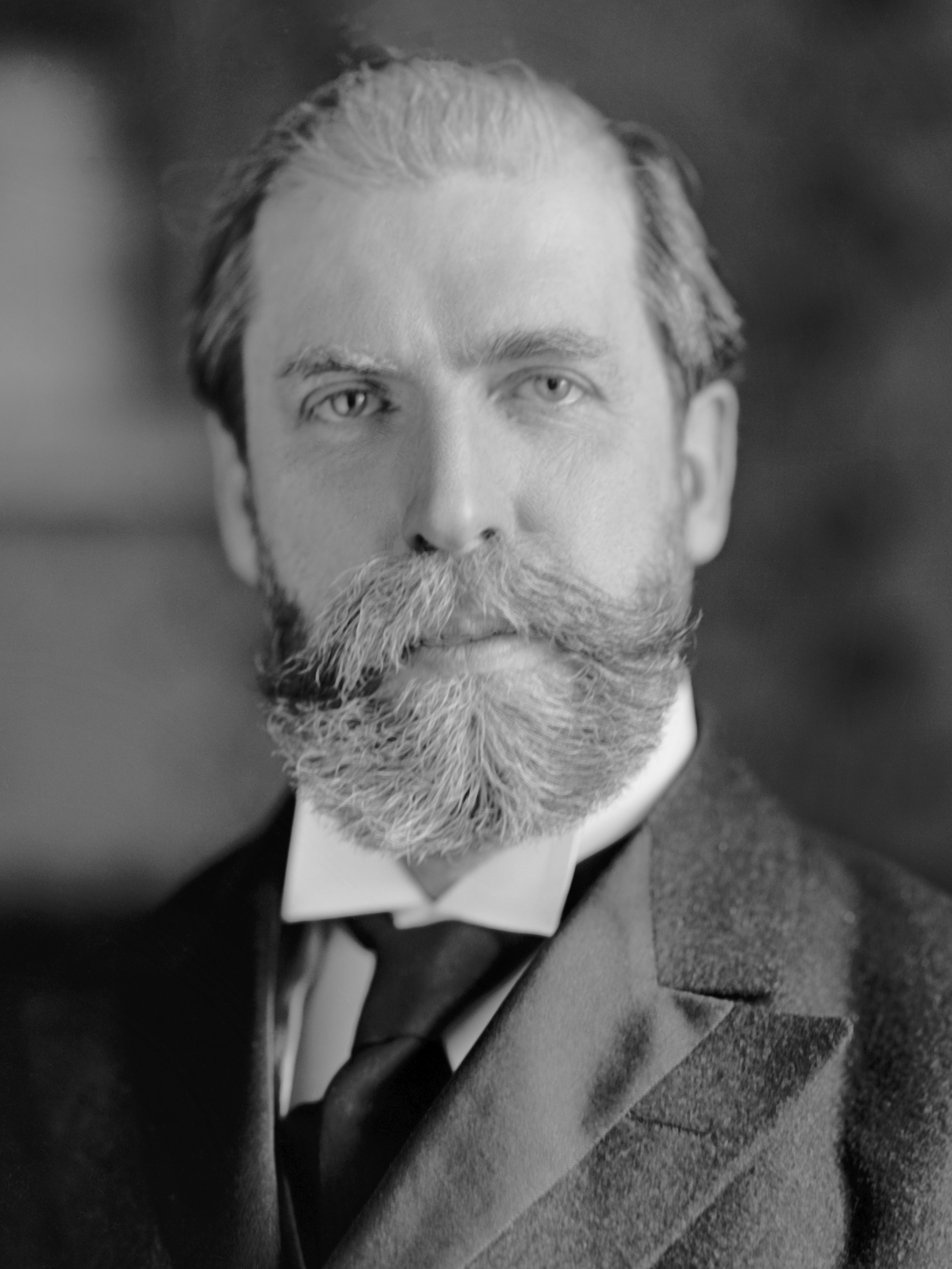

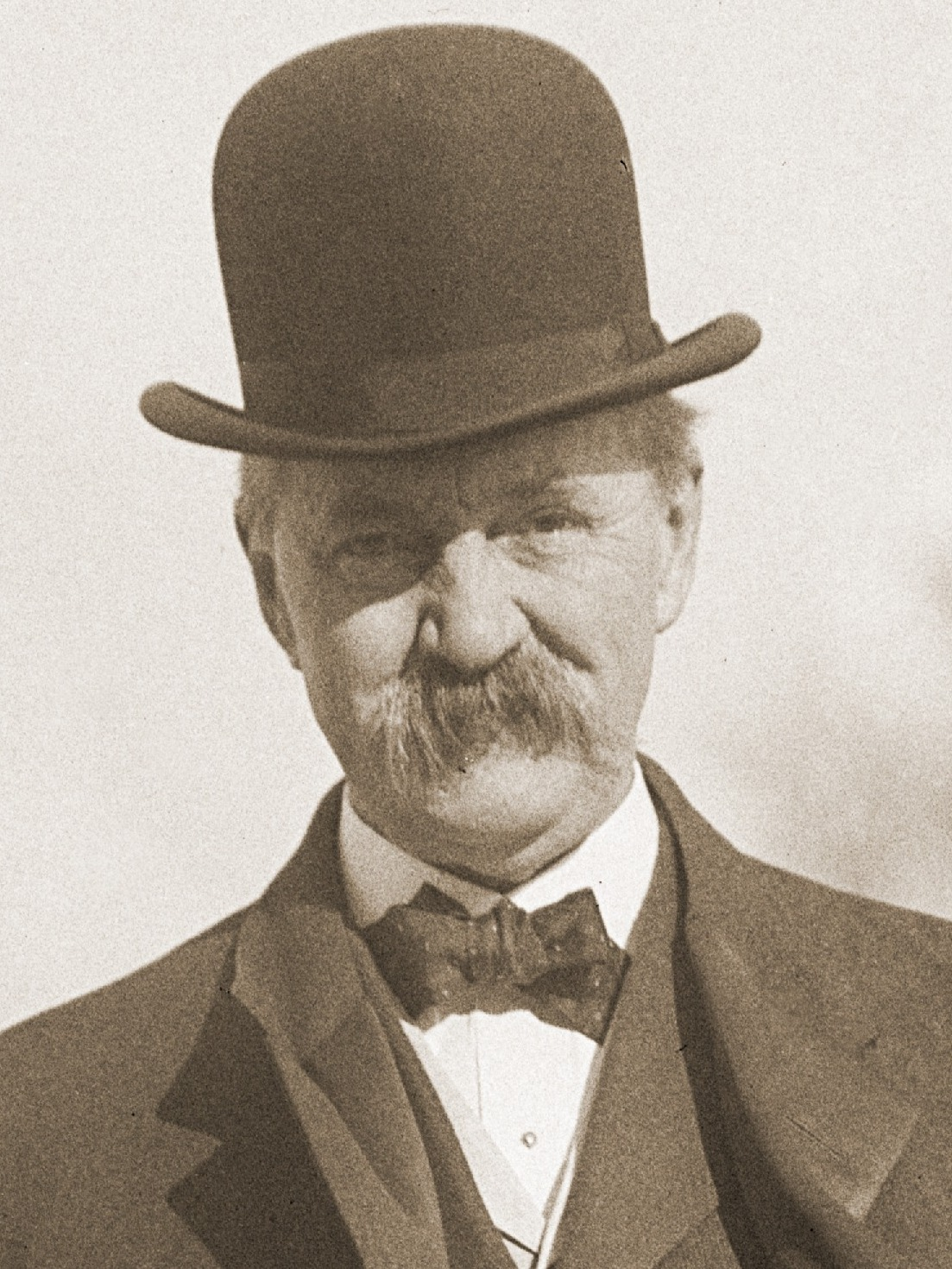

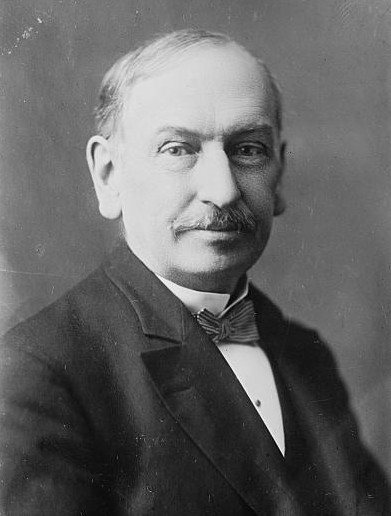
Candidate	Charles Evans Hughes	Albert B. Cummins	Theodore E. Burton
Home state	New York	Iowa	Ohio
Delegate count	10	0	0
Popular vote	56,764	27,558	10,593
Percentage	59.81%	29.03%	11.16%
- Election results by county Hughes: 40-50% 50-60% 60-70% 70-80%

A primary for the Republican presidential candidate was held in Oregon on May 19, 1916. Unlike his opponents, Albert B. Cummins and Theodore E. Burton, Hughes did not campaign for himself in the state. Before the primary, he had attempted to stop a petition circulating without his consent to place him on the ballot. In response to Hughes' protest, Secretary of State Ben W. Olcott refused to heed the petition. The matter was appealed to the courts, which ruled that a petition to place someone on the ballot could be submitted without that person's consent.

During the campaign, supporters of the Bull Moose Party who wanted Theodore Roosevelt nominated by their own party as well as by the Republicans campaigned for Cummins in an attempt to get him to win the primary, thereby discrediting Hughes, who they believed would be a harder man to beat in the convention.

Hughes won the primary with 58,764 votes to Cummins's 27,558 and Burton's 10,593. According to The New York Times, voter turnout was estimated at roughly 70 percent of registered voters, with women playing a significant role in the outcome. A Portland dispatch further reported that "the assertion is made that the women voted for HUGHES 3 to 1."

== Results ==
Presidential Candidate	Running Mate	Party	Electoral Vote (EV)	Popular Vote (PV)	
Charles Evans Hughes of New York	Charles W. Fairbanks	Republican	5	126,813	48.47%
Woodrow Wilson	Thomas R. Marshall	Democratic	0	120,087	45.90%
Allan L. Benson	George Kirkpatrick	Socialist	0	9,711	3.71%
Frank Hanly	Ira Landrith	Prohibition	0	4,729	1.81%
—	—	Progressive	0	310	0.12%

=== Results by county ===
County	Charles Evans Hughes Republican		Woodrow Wilson Democratic		Allan L. Benson Socialist		Frank Hanly Prohibition		No candidate Progressive "Bull Moose"		Margin		Total votes cast
County	#	%	#	%	#	%	#	%	#	%	#	%	Total votes cast
Baker	2,541	37.16%	3,897	56.99%	324	4.74%	69	1.01%	7	0.10%	-1,356	-19.83%	6,838
Benton	2,902	50.72%	2,488	43.48%	120	2.10%	207	3.62%	5	0.09%	414	7.24%	5,722
Clackamas	6,349	50.91%	5,334	42.77%	556	4.46%	222	1.78%	10	0.08%	1,015	8.14%	12,471
Clatsop	2,568	49.44%	2,239	43.11%	320	6.16%	65	1.25%	2	0.04%	329	6.33%	5,194
Columbia	2,023	53.95%	1,451	38.69%	182	4.85%	92	2.45%	2	0.05%	572	15.25%	3,750
Coos	3,209	43.61%	3,352	45.56%	708	9.62%	74	1.01%	15	0.20%	-143	-1.94%	7,358
Crook	1,675	36.21%	2,699	58.34%	209	4.52%	38	0.82%	5	0.11%	-1,024	-22.14%	4,626
Curry	541	45.62%	512	43.17%	118	9.95%	8	0.67%	7	0.59%	29	2.45%	1,186
Douglas	3,922	48.16%	3,679	45.18%	420	5.16%	117	1.44%	5	0.06%	243	2.98%	8,143
Gilliam	557	37.89%	870	59.18%	25	1.70%	17	1.16%	1	0.07%	-313	-21.29%	1,470
Grant	941	40.56%	1,210	52.16%	145	6.25%	17	0.73%	7	0.30%	-269	-11.59%	2,320
Harney	872	37.52%	1,239	53.31%	189	8.13%	22	0.95%	2	0.09%	-367	-15.79%	2,324
Hood River	1,314	48.33%	1,188	43.69%	158	5.81%	58	2.13%	1	0.04%	126	4.63%	2,719
Jackson	3,538	39.41%	4,874	54.29%	321	3.58%	230	2.56%	15	0.17%	-1,336	-14.88%	8,978
Jefferson	581	36.13%	904	56.22%	62	3.86%	60	3.73%	1	0.06%	-323	-20.09%	1,608
Josephine	1,660	46.20%	1,656	46.09%	230	6.40%	42	1.17%	5	0.14%	4	0.11%	3,593
Klamath	1,631	44.37%	1,853	50.41%	170	4.62%	18	0.49%	4	0.11%	-222	-6.04%	3,676
Lake	793	41.94%	971	51.35%	98	5.18%	27	1.43%	2	0.11%	-178	-9.41%	1,891
Lane	7,253	51.70%	5,880	41.92%	607	4.33%	261	1.86%	27	0.19%	1,373	9.79%	14,028
Lincoln	1,167	50.87%	915	39.89%	190	8.28%	17	0.74%	5	0.22%	252	10.99%	2,294
Linn	4,524	46.26%	4,675	47.81%	318	3.25%	253	2.59%	9	0.09%	-151	-1.54%	9,779
Malheur	1,682	42.38%	1,937	48.80%	293	7.38%	54	1.36%	3	0.08%	-255	-6.42%	3,969
Marion	8,316	55.48%	5,699	38.02%	473	3.16%	475	3.17%	25	0.17%	2,617	17.46%	14,988
Morrow	748	44.08%	830	48.91%	92	5.42%	26	1.53%	1	0.06%	-82	-4.83%	1,697
Multnomah	41,458	51.67%	35,755	44.56%	1,852	2.31%	1,083	1.35%	87	0.11%	5,703	7.11%	80,235
Polk	2,899	47.89%	2,844	46.98%	187	3.09%	120	1.98%	4	0.07%	55	0.91%	6,054
Sherman	717	46.86%	747	48.82%	18	1.18%	48	3.14%	0	0.00%	-30	-1.96%	1,530
Tillamook	1,547	53.86%	1,175	40.91%	95	3.31%	53	1.85%	2	0.07%	372	12.95%	2,872
Umatilla	3,664	42.33%	4,606	53.22%	256	2.96%	122	1.41%	7	0.08%	-942	-10.88%	8,655
Union	2,253	39.77%	3,086	54.47%	259	4.57%	63	1.11%	4	0.07%	-833	-14.70%	5,665
Wallowa	1,198	35.75%	1,960	58.49%	165	4.92%	20	0.60%	8	0.24%	-762	-22.74%	3,351
Wasco	2,243	47.53%	2,287	48.46%	103	2.18%	80	1.70%	6	0.13%	-44	-0.93%	4,719
Washington	4,888	56.16%	3,363	38.64%	219	2.52%	222	2.55%	11	0.13%	1,525	17.52%	8,703
Wheeler	629	51.73%	570	46.88%	10	0.82%	6	0.49%	1	0.08%	59	4.85%	1,216
Yamhill	4,010	49.95%	3,342	41.63%	219	2.73%	443	5.52%	14	0.17%	668	8.32%	8,028
Totals	126,813	48.47%	120,087	45.90%	9,711	3.71%	4,729	1.81%	310	0.12%	6,726	2.57%	261,650

== See also ==
- United States presidential elections in Oregon
