= 1956 United States presidential election in Oregon =

- November 6, 1956

All 6 Oregon votes to the Electoral College

| Nominee | Dwight D. Eisenhower | Adlai Stevenson |
| Party | Republican | Democratic |
| Home state | Pennsylvania (Note: Although he was born in Texas and grew up in Kansas before his military career, at the time of the 1952 election Eisenhower was president of Columbia University and was, officially, a resident of New York. During his first term as president, he moved his private residence to Gettysburg, Pennsylvania, and officially changed his residency to Pennsylvania.) | Illinois |
| Running mate | Richard Nixon | Estes Kefauver |
| Electoral vote | 6 | 0 |
| Popular vote | 406,393 | 329,204 |
| Percentage | 55.25% | 44.75% |
County results
Eisenhower
50–60%
60–70%
Stevenson
50–60%
President before election
Dwight D. Eisenhower
Republican
Elected President
Dwight D. Eisenhower
Republican

The 1956 United States presidential election in Oregon took place on November 6, 1956, as part of the 1956 United States presidential election. Voters chose six representatives, or electors, to the Electoral College, who voted for president and vice president.

Oregon was won by incumbent President Dwight D. Eisenhower (R–Pennsylvania), running with Vice President Richard Nixon, with 55.25% of the popular vote, against Adlai Stevenson (D–Illinois), running with Senator Estes Kefauver, with 44.75% of the popular vote. As of the 2024 presidential election, this is the last election in which Clatsop County voted for a Republican presidential candidate.

== Results ==
1956 United States presidential election in Oregon
| Party | Candidate | Votes | % |
|---|---|---|---|
| Republican | Dwight D. Eisenhower (inc.) | 406,393 | 55.25% |
| Democratic | Adlai Stevenson | 329,204 | 44.75% |
| Total votes | | 735,597 | 100% |

=== Results by county ===
| County | Dwight D. Eisenhower Republican | | Adlai Stevenson Democratic | | Margin | | Total votes cast |
| County | # | % | # | % | # | % | Total votes cast |
|---|---|---|---|---|---|---|---|
| Baker | 3,706 | 51.93% | 3,431 | 48.07% | 275 | 3.86% | 7,137 |
| Benton | 9,016 | 68.15% | 4,214 | 31.85% | 4,802 | 36.30% | 13,230 |
| Clackamas | 25,314 | 55.36% | 20,416 | 44.64% | 4,898 | 10.72% | 45,730 |
| Clatsop | 6,616 | 50.94% | 6,372 | 49.06% | 244 | 1.88% | 12,988 |
| Columbia | 4,275 | 43.33% | 5,592 | 56.67% | -1,317 | -13.34% | 9,867 |
| Coos | 9,201 | 45.14% | 11,183 | 54.86% | -1,982 | -9.72% | 20,384 |
| Crook | 1,879 | 51.00% | 1,805 | 49.00% | 74 | 2.00% | 3,684 |
| Curry | 2,306 | 53.60% | 1,996 | 46.40% | 310 | 7.20% | 4,302 |
| Deschutes | 5,399 | 56.83% | 4,102 | 43.17% | 1,297 | 13.66% | 9,501 |
| Douglas | 13,837 | 53.92% | 11,825 | 46.08% | 2,012 | 7.84% | 25,662 |
| Gilliam | 793 | 59.58% | 538 | 40.42% | 255 | 19.16% | 1,331 |
| Grant | 1,822 | 59.10% | 1,261 | 40.90% | 561 | 18.20% | 3,083 |
| Harney | 1,512 | 55.51% | 1,212 | 44.49% | 300 | 11.02% | 2,724 |
| Hood River | 3,149 | 56.29% | 2,445 | 43.71% | 704 | 12.58% | 5,594 |
| Jackson | 17,201 | 57.46% | 12,733 | 42.54% | 4,468 | 14.92% | 29,934 |
| Jefferson | 1,356 | 54.83% | 1,117 | 45.17% | 239 | 9.66% | 2,473 |
| Josephine | 7,967 | 62.10% | 4,863 | 37.90% | 3,104 | 24.20% | 12,830 |
| Klamath | 9,740 | 53.59% | 8,434 | 46.41% | 1,306 | 7.18% | 18,174 |
| Lake | 1,623 | 55.73% | 1,289 | 44.27% | 334 | 11.46% | 2,912 |
| Lane | 35,264 | 56.15% | 27,534 | 43.85% | 7,730 | 12.30% | 62,798 |
| Lincoln | 5,346 | 53.62% | 4,624 | 46.38% | 722 | 7.24% | 9,970 |
| Linn | 12,469 | 55.12% | 10,153 | 44.88% | 2,316 | 10.24% | 22,622 |
| Malheur | 4,981 | 61.25% | 3,151 | 38.75% | 1,830 | 22.50% | 8,132 |
| Marion | 28,990 | 64.19% | 16,170 | 35.81% | 12,820 | 28.38% | 45,160 |
| Morrow | 1,092 | 55.01% | 893 | 44.99% | 199 | 10.02% | 1,985 |
| Multnomah | 129,658 | 52.80% | 115,896 | 47.20% | 13,762 | 5.60% | 245,554 |
| Polk | 6,404 | 61.28% | 4,047 | 38.72% | 2,357 | 22.56% | 10,451 |
| Sherman | 671 | 61.50% | 420 | 38.50% | 251 | 23.00% | 1,091 |
| Tillamook | 4,306 | 53.89% | 3,684 | 46.11% | 622 | 7.78% | 7,990 |
| Umatilla | 9,654 | 55.70% | 7,678 | 44.30% | 1,976 | 11.40% | 17,332 |
| Union | 3,749 | 46.07% | 4,389 | 53.93% | -640 | -7.86% | 8,138 |
| Wallowa | 1,604 | 48.21% | 1,723 | 51.79% | -119 | -3.58% | 3,327 |
| Wasco | 4,332 | 50.98% | 4,165 | 49.02% | 167 | 1.96% | 8,497 |
| Washington | 22,001 | 61.07% | 14,027 | 38.93% | 7,974 | 22.14% | 36,028 |
| Wheeler | 605 | 51.53% | 569 | 48.47% | 36 | 3.06% | 1,174 |
| Yamhill | 8,555 | 61.96% | 5,253 | 38.04% | 3,302 | 23.92% | 13,808 |
| Totals | 406,393 | 55.25% | 329,204 | 44.75% | 77,189 | 10.50% | 735,597 |

==== Counties that flipped from Republican to Democratic ====
- Coos
- Union
- Wallowa

== See also ==
- United States presidential elections in Oregon
