= 1940 United States presidential election in Oregon =

- November 5, 1940

All 5 Oregon votes to the Electoral College

Nominee	Franklin D. Roosevelt	Wendell Willkie
Party	Democratic	Republican
Home state	New York	New York
Running mate	Henry A. Wallace	Charles L. McNary
Electoral vote	5	0
Popular vote	258,415	219,555
Percentage	53.70%	45.62%
County results
Roosevelt
40–50%
50–60%
60–70%
Willkie
50–60%
60–70%
President before election
Franklin D. Roosevelt
Democratic
Elected President
Franklin D. Roosevelt
Democratic

The 1940 United States presidential election in Oregon took place on November 5, 1940, as part of the 1940 United States presidential election. Voters chose five representatives, or electors, to the Electoral College, who voted for president and vice president.

Oregon was won by incumbent President Franklin D. Roosevelt (D–New York), running with Secretary of Agriculture Henry A. Wallace, with 53.70% of the popular vote, against Wendell Willkie (R–New York), running with Minority Leader and Oregon senior Senator Charles L. McNary, with 45.62% of the popular vote.

As of the 2024 presidential election, this is the last occasion when Malheur County has voted for a Democratic presidential candidate.

== Results ==
1940 United States presidential election in Oregon
Party	Candidate	Votes	%
Democratic	Franklin D. Roosevelt (inc.)	258,415	53.70%
Republican	Wendell Willkie	219,555	45.62%
Socialist Labor	John W. Aiken	2,487	0.52%
Write-in	Norman Thomas	398	0.08%
Write-in	Earl Browder	191	0.04%
Write-in	Roger Babson	154	0.03%
Write-ins	Other candidates	40	0.01%
Total votes		481,240	100%

=== Results by county ===
County	Franklin D. Roosevelt Democratic		Wendell Willkie Republican		Various candidates Other parties		Margin		Total votes cast
County	#	%	#	%	#	%	#	%	Total votes cast
Baker	4,353	58.09%	3,101	41.39%	39	0.52%	1,252	16.71%	7,493
Benton	2,942	36.42%	5,089	62.99%	48	0.59%	-2,147	-26.58%	8,079
Clackamas	13,547	53.86%	11,416	45.39%	190	0.76%	2,131	8.47%	25,153
Clatsop	6,686	63.59%	3,758	35.74%	70	0.67%	2,928	27.85%	10,514
Columbia	5,758	65.63%	2,959	33.72%	57	0.65%	2,799	31.90%	8,774
Coos	7,853	60.46%	5,034	38.76%	101	0.78%	2,819	21.70%	12,988
Crook	1,439	60.01%	942	39.28%	17	0.71%	497	20.73%	2,398
Curry	1,033	51.88%	941	47.26%	17	0.85%	92	4.62%	1,991
Deschutes	4,775	64.07%	2,603	34.93%	75	1.01%	2,172	29.14%	7,453
Douglas	4,707	43.70%	5,991	55.63%	72	0.67%	-1,284	-11.92%	10,770
Gilliam	785	60.06%	518	39.63%	4	0.31%	267	20.43%	1,307
Grant	1,582	58.70%	1,103	40.93%	10	0.37%	479	17.77%	2,695
Harney	1,214	56.84%	912	42.70%	10	0.47%	302	14.14%	2,136
Hood River	2,367	50.48%	2,305	49.16%	17	0.36%	62	1.32%	4,689
Jackson	6,754	44.03%	8,507	55.46%	78	0.51%	-1,753	-11.43%	15,339
Jefferson	467	52.12%	423	47.21%	6	0.67%	44	4.91%	896
Josephine	2,888	41.66%	3,964	57.18%	80	1.15%	-1,076	-15.52%	6,932
Klamath	9,345	59.87%	6,169	39.52%	96	0.61%	3,176	20.35%	15,610
Lake	1,414	55.58%	1,121	44.06%	9	0.35%	293	11.52%	2,544
Lane	16,286	51.07%	15,349	48.13%	255	0.80%	937	2.94%	31,890
Lincoln	3,510	53.47%	2,962	45.12%	93	1.42%	548	8.35%	6,565
Linn	6,360	49.08%	6,523	50.34%	76	0.59%	-163	-1.26%	12,959
Malheur	2,958	49.89%	2,929	49.40%	42	0.71%	29	0.49%	5,929
Marion	14,031	44.93%	16,940	54.25%	256	0.82%	-2,909	-9.32%	31,227
Morrow	979	55.97%	758	43.34%	12	0.69%	221	12.64%	1,749
Multnomah	97,595	56.64%	73,612	42.72%	1,106	0.64%	23,983	13.92%	172,313
Polk	4,077	48.84%	4,211	50.44%	60	0.72%	-134	-1.61%	8,348
Sherman	670	53.69%	575	46.07%	3	0.24%	95	7.61%	1,248
Tillamook	2,786	52.19%	2,516	47.13%	36	0.67%	270	5.06%	5,338
Umatilla	4,935	48.57%	5,193	51.11%	32	0.31%	-258	-2.54%	10,160
Union	4,500	62.53%	2,642	36.71%	54	0.75%	1,858	25.82%	7,196
Wallowa	1,974	59.62%	1,319	39.84%	18	0.54%	655	19.78%	3,311
Wasco	3,001	53.82%	2,553	45.79%	22	0.39%	448	8.03%	5,576
Washington	8,626	50.44%	8,367	48.92%	110	0.64%	259	1.51%	17,103
Wheeler	652	47.94%	705	51.84%	3	0.22%	-53	-3.90%	1,360
Yamhill	5,566	49.67%	5,545	49.48%	96	0.86%	21	0.19%	11,207
Totals	258,415	53.70%	219,555	45.62%	3,270	0.68%	38,860	8.07%	481,240

==== Counties that flipped from Democratic to Republican ====
- Benton
- Douglas
- Jackson
- Josephine
- Linn
- Marion
- Polk
- Umatilla
- Wheeler

== See also ==
- United States presidential elections in Oregon
