= 1972 United States presidential election in Oregon =

- November 7, 1972

Nominee	Richard Nixon	George McGovern
Party	Republican	Democratic
Home state	California	South Dakota
Running mate	Spiro Agnew	Sargent Shriver
Electoral vote	6	0
Popular vote	486,686	392,760
Percentage	52.45%	42.33%
County results
Nixon
40–50%
50–60%
60–70%
McGovern
40–50%
50–60%
President before election
Richard Nixon
Republican
Elected President
Richard Nixon
Republican

The 1972 United States presidential election in Oregon took place on November 7, 1972. All fifty states and the District of Columbia were part of the 1972 United States presidential election. Voters chose six electors to the Electoral College, who voted for president and vice president.

Oregon was won by the Republican nominees, incumbent President Richard Nixon of California and his running mate Vice President Spiro Agnew of Maryland. Nixon and Agnew defeated the Democratic nominees, Senator George McGovern of South Dakota and his running mate U.S. Ambassador Sargent Shriver of Maryland.

Nixon carried Oregon with 52.45% of the vote to McGovern's 42.33%, a victory margin of 10.12%, which made Oregon 13% more Democratic than the nation-at-large.

Independent candidate John G. Schmitz would carry 4.98% of the popular vote in Oregon, which would make the state his fourth strongest after Idaho, Alaska and Utah.

== Results ==
1972 United States presidential election in Oregon
Party	Candidate	Votes	%
Republican	Richard Nixon (incumbent)	486,686	52.45%
Democratic	George McGovern	392,760	42.33%
Independent	John G. Schmitz	46,211	4.98%
Other	Write-ins	2,289	0.25%
Total votes		927,946	100%

=== Results by county ===
County	Richard Nixon Republican		George McGovern Democratic		John G. Schmitz Independent		Various candidates Write-ins		Margin		Total votes cast
County	#	%	#	%	#	%	#	%	#	%	Total votes cast
Baker	3,441	55.32%	2,047	32.91%	718	11.54%	14	0.23%	1,394	22.41%	6,220
Benton	14,906	56.34%	10,842	40.98%	636	2.40%	72	0.27%	4,064	15.36%	26,456
Clackamas	41,767	53.49%	32,540	41.67%	3,623	4.64%	159	0.20%	9,227	11.82%	78,089
Clatsop	5,998	47.43%	6,017	47.58%	618	4.89%	14	0.11%	-19	-0.15%	12,647
Columbia	5,348	43.54%	5,997	48.82%	877	7.14%	62	0.50%	-649	-5.28%	12,284
Coos	10,370	44.67%	11,778	50.74%	995	4.29%	70	0.30%	-1,408	-6.07%	23,213
Crook	2,167	52.56%	1,743	42.28%	195	4.73%	18	0.44%	424	10.28%	4,123
Curry	2,832	51.77%	2,108	38.54%	519	9.49%	11	0.20%	724	13.23%	5,470
Deschutes	7,747	52.28%	6,319	42.64%	714	4.82%	39	0.26%	1,428	9.64%	14,819
Douglas	15,881	57.73%	9,009	32.75%	2,569	9.34%	49	0.18%	6,872	24.98%	27,508
Gilliam	665	62.21%	355	33.21%	47	4.40%	2	0.19%	310	29.00%	1,069
Grant	1,781	60.35%	932	31.58%	224	7.59%	14	0.47%	849	28.77%	2,951
Harney	1,693	59.13%	1,004	35.07%	159	5.55%	7	0.24%	689	24.06%	2,863
Hood River	3,152	53.96%	2,330	39.89%	350	5.99%	9	0.15%	822	14.07%	5,841
Jackson	24,003	57.75%	14,529	34.96%	2,914	7.01%	115	0.28%	9,474	22.79%	41,561
Jefferson	1,816	56.38%	1,229	38.16%	164	5.09%	12	0.37%	587	18.22%	3,221
Josephine	9,911	58.55%	5,090	30.07%	1,858	10.98%	68	0.40%	4,821	28.48%	16,927
Klamath	11,169	58.93%	5,719	30.17%	2,029	10.70%	37	0.20%	5,450	28.76%	18,954
Lake	1,619	61.03%	777	29.29%	247	9.31%	10	0.38%	842	31.74%	2,653
Lane	47,739	48.62%	46,177	47.03%	4,001	4.07%	270	0.27%	1,562	1.59%	98,187
Lincoln	6,112	51.56%	5,117	43.17%	610	5.15%	15	0.13%	995	8.39%	11,854
Linn	15,079	54.21%	11,178	40.19%	1,507	5.42%	50	0.18%	3,901	14.02%	27,814
Malheur	5,908	67.36%	1,870	21.32%	986	11.24%	7	0.08%	4,038	46.04%	8,771
Marion	36,441	57.51%	23,908	37.73%	2,889	4.56%	123	0.19%	12,533	19.78%	63,361
Morrow	1,059	52.77%	718	35.77%	222	11.06%	8	0.40%	341	17.00%	2,007
Multnomah	118,219	46.73%	125,470	49.60%	8,571	3.39%	698	0.28%	-7,251	-2.87%	252,958
Polk	8,985	57.56%	5,908	37.85%	687	4.40%	29	0.19%	3,077	19.71%	15,609
Sherman	677	64.91%	330	31.64%	36	3.45%			347	33.27%	1,043
Tillamook	4,120	51.22%	3,544	44.06%	371	4.61%	9	0.11%	576	7.16%	8,044
Umatilla	10,470	57.94%	6,090	33.70%	1,453	8.04%	58	0.32%	4,380	24.24%	18,071
Union	5,073	56.46%	3,272	36.42%	631	7.02%	9	0.10%	1,801	20.04%	8,985
Wallowa	1,909	62.28%	899	29.33%	250	8.16%	7	0.23%	1,010	32.95%	3,065
Wasco	4,537	51.70%	3,749	42.72%	467	5.32%	22	0.25%	788	8.98%	8,775
Washington	43,958	58.43%	27,890	37.07%	3,226	4.29%	164	0.22%	16,068	21.36%	75,238
Wheeler	474	60.31%	267	33.97%	41	5.22%	4	0.51%	207	26.34%	786
Yamhill	9,660	58.51%	6,008	36.39%	807	4.89%	34	0.21%	3,652	22.12%	16,509
Totals	486,686	52.45%	392,760	42.33%	46,211	4.98%	2,289	0.25%	93,926	10.12%	927,946

== See also ==
- United States presidential elections in Oregon
