= 1932 United States presidential election in Oregon =

- November 8, 1932

All 5 Oregon votes to the Electoral College

| Nominee | Franklin D. Roosevelt | Herbert Hoover |
| Party | Democratic | Republican |
| Home state | New York | California |
| Running mate | John Nance Garner | Charles Curtis |
| Electoral vote | 5 | 0 |
| Popular vote | 213,871 | 136,019 |
| Percentage | 57.99% | 36.88% |
County results
Roosevelt
40–50%
50–60%
60–70%
70–80%
Hoover
50–60%
President before election
Herbert Hoover
Republican
Elected President
Franklin D. Roosevelt
Democratic

The 1932 United States presidential election in Oregon took place on November 8, 1932, as part of the 1932 United States presidential election. Voters chose five representatives, or electors, to the Electoral College, who voted for president and vice president.

Oregon was essentially a one-party Republican state during the Fourth Party System from 1896 to 1928, with the party winning almost every statewide election during the period. Apart from Woodrow Wilson’s two elections, during the first of which the GOP was severely divided, no Democrat had carried a single county in the state since William Jennings Bryan in 1900.

However, since the 1928 election when Oregon had been won against Al Smith by 30.04%, the United States had fallen into the Great Depression, which had been particularly severe in the rural western parts of the nation. The New Deal was especially popular in the Pacific States, and as a result, Roosevelt was assured of carrying the state.

Oregon was won by Governor Franklin D. Roosevelt (D–New York), running with Speaker John Nance Garner, with 57.99% of the popular vote, against incumbent President Herbert Hoover (R–California), running with Vice President Charles Curtis, with 36.88% of the popular vote. Roosevelt flipped every county in Oregon except arch-Yankee Benton. This election marked the first-ever Democratic victory in the northern coastal counties of Clatsop, Tillamook, and Lincoln as well as the first Democratic victory in the Portland Metro-rooted county of Washington, the inland wheat-growing county of Wheeler, and the Central Oregon county of Deschutes. It was also just the second Democratic victory in the historically Republican counties of Clackamas, Gilliam, Marion, Multnomah, Sherman and Yamhill.

== Results ==
1932 United States presidential election in Oregon
| Party | Candidate | Votes | % |
|---|---|---|---|
| Democratic | Franklin D. Roosevelt | 213,871 | 57.99% |
| Republican | Herbert Hoover (inc.) | 136,019 | 36.88% |
| Socialist | Norman Thomas | 15,450 | 4.19% |
| Socialist Labor | Verne L. Reynolds | 1,730 | 0.47% |
| Communist | William Z. Foster | 1,681 | 0.46% |
| Write-in | | 57 | 0.02% |
| Total votes | | 368,808 | 100% |

=== Results by county ===
| County | Franklin D. Roosevelt Democratic | | Herbert Hoover Republican | | Norman Thomas Socialist | | Verne L. Reynolds Socialist Labor | | Various candidates Other parties | | Margin | | Total votes cast |
| County | # | % | # | % | # | % | # | % | # | % | # | % | Total votes cast |
|---|---|---|---|---|---|---|---|---|---|---|---|---|---|
| Baker | 4,420 | 66.23% | 2,097 | 31.42% | 136 | 2.04% | 13 | 0.19% | 8 | 0.12% | 2,323 | 34.81% | 6,674 |
| Benton | 3,121 | 42.00% | 4,068 | 54.74% | 219 | 2.95% | 15 | 0.20% | 10 | 0.13% | -947 | -12.74% | 7,431 |
| Clackamas | 11,575 | 62.20% | 5,964 | 32.05% | 916 | 4.92% | 89 | 0.48% | 64 | 0.34% | 5,611 | 30.15% | 18,608 |
| Clatsop | 4,473 | 59.98% | 2,570 | 34.46% | 183 | 2.45% | 63 | 0.84% | 168 | 2.25% | 1,903 | 25.52% | 7,457 |
| Columbia | 3,643 | 61.36% | 1,975 | 33.27% | 231 | 3.89% | 49 | 0.83% | 39 | 0.66% | 1,668 | 28.09% | 5,937 |
| Coos | 5,504 | 59.21% | 3,299 | 35.49% | 376 | 4.04% | 52 | 0.56% | 65 | 0.70% | 2,205 | 23.72% | 9,296 |
| Crook | 990 | 59.78% | 626 | 37.80% | 30 | 1.81% | 8 | 0.48% | 2 | 0.12% | 364 | 21.98% | 1,656 |
| Curry | 971 | 68.00% | 395 | 27.66% | 54 | 3.78% | 6 | 0.42% | 2 | 0.14% | 576 | 40.34% | 1,428 |
| Deschutes | 2,962 | 58.60% | 1,697 | 33.57% | 246 | 4.87% | 117 | 2.31% | 33 | 0.65% | 1,265 | 25.02% | 5,055 |
| Douglas | 4,638 | 51.23% | 4,046 | 44.69% | 283 | 3.13% | 47 | 0.52% | 40 | 0.44% | 592 | 6.54% | 9,054 |
| Gilliam | 854 | 63.59% | 470 | 35.00% | 12 | 0.89% | 2 | 0.15% | 5 | 0.37% | 384 | 28.59% | 1,343 |
| Grant | 1,496 | 64.34% | 733 | 31.53% | 78 | 3.35% | 17 | 0.73% | 1 | 0.04% | 763 | 32.82% | 2,325 |
| Harney | 1,276 | 61.73% | 687 | 33.24% | 80 | 3.87% | 21 | 1.02% | 4 | 0.19% | 589 | 28.50% | 2,067 |
| Hood River | 1,685 | 51.75% | 1,387 | 42.60% | 141 | 4.33% | 24 | 0.74% | 19 | 0.58% | 298 | 9.15% | 3,256 |
| Jackson | 7,519 | 55.13% | 5,459 | 40.02% | 582 | 4.27% | 61 | 0.45% | 18 | 0.13% | 2,060 | 15.10% | 13,639 |
| Jefferson | 477 | 62.27% | 253 | 33.03% | 31 | 4.05% | 3 | 0.39% | 2 | 0.26% | 224 | 29.24% | 766 |
| Josephine | 3,060 | 58.90% | 1,757 | 33.82% | 314 | 6.04% | 53 | 1.02% | 14 | 0.27% | 1,303 | 25.08% | 5,195 |
| Klamath | 6,772 | 62.97% | 3,483 | 32.38% | 400 | 3.72% | 61 | 0.57% | 39 | 0.36% | 3,289 | 30.58% | 10,755 |
| Lake | 1,199 | 57.53% | 839 | 40.26% | 30 | 1.44% | 14 | 0.67% | 2 | 0.10% | 360 | 17.27% | 2,084 |
| Lane | 11,073 | 45.88% | 10,547 | 43.70% | 2,345 | 9.72% | 124 | 0.51% | 48 | 0.20% | 526 | 2.18% | 24,137 |
| Lincoln | 2,376 | 59.49% | 1,415 | 35.43% | 156 | 3.90% | 26 | 0.65% | 25 | 0.63% | 961 | 24.06% | 3,994 |
| Linn | 5,366 | 53.49% | 4,106 | 40.93% | 496 | 4.94% | 43 | 0.43% | 20 | 0.20% | 1,260 | 12.56% | 10,031 |
| Malheur | 2,025 | 53.94% | 1,589 | 42.33% | 104 | 2.77% | 25 | 0.67% | 11 | 0.29% | 436 | 11.61% | 3,754 |
| Marion | 12,572 | 56.84% | 8,633 | 39.03% | 760 | 3.43% | 92 | 0.42% | 74 | 0.33% | 3,939 | 17.81% | 22,118 |
| Morrow | 929 | 58.03% | 579 | 36.16% | 78 | 4.87% | 6 | 0.37% | 9 | 0.56% | 350 | 21.86% | 1,601 |
| Multnomah | 78,898 | 59.44% | 47,201 | 35.56% | 5,348 | 4.03% | 432 | 0.33% | 864 | 0.65% | 31,697 | 23.88% | 132,743 |
| Polk | 3,705 | 56.88% | 2,548 | 39.12% | 205 | 3.15% | 40 | 0.61% | 16 | 0.25% | 1,157 | 17.76% | 6,514 |
| Sherman | 665 | 59.80% | 423 | 38.04% | 19 | 1.71% | 5 | 0.45% | 0 | 0.00% | 242 | 21.76% | 1,112 |
| Tillamook | 2,726 | 57.51% | 1,722 | 36.33% | 245 | 5.15% | 34 | 0.72% | 28 | 0.59% | 1,004 | 21.18% | 4,740 |
| Umatilla | 5,631 | 63.43% | 2,930 | 33.01% | 283 | 3.19% | 28 | 0.32% | 5 | 0.06% | 2,701 | 30.43% | 8,877 |
| Union | 4,450 | 70.08% | 1,705 | 26.85% | 159 | 2.50% | 29 | 0.46% | 7 | 0.11% | 2,745 | 43.23% | 6,350 |
| Wallowa | 1,790 | 67.50% | 772 | 29.11% | 75 | 2.83% | 13 | 0.49% | 2 | 0.08% | 1,018 | 38.39% | 2,652 |
| Wasco | 2,776 | 59.52% | 1,740 | 37.31% | 127 | 2.72% | 13 | 0.28% | 8 | 0.17% | 1,036 | 22.21% | 4,664 |
| Washington | 6,824 | 59.06% | 4,201 | 36.36% | 444 | 3.84% | 56 | 0.48% | 48 | 0.41% | 2,623 | 22.70% | 11,554 |
| Wheeler | 632 | 54.25% | 519 | 44.55% | 10 | 0.86% | 4 | 0.34% | 0 | 0.00% | 113 | 9.70% | 1,165 |
| Yamhill | 4,798 | 55.03% | 3,584 | 41.11% | 254 | 2.91% | 45 | 0.52% | 38 | 0.44% | 1,214 | 13.92% | 8,719 |
| Totals | 213,871 | 58.00% | 136,019 | 36.89% | 15,450 | 4.19% | 1,730 | 0.47% | 1,738 | 0.47% | 77,852 | 21.11% | 368,751 |

==== Counties that flipped from Republican to Democratic ====
- Baker
- Baker
- Clackamas
- Clatsop
- Columbia
- Coos
- Crook
- Curry
- Deschutes
- Douglas
- Gilliam
- Grant
- Harney
- Hood River
- Jackson
- Jefferson
- Josephine
- Klamath
- Lake
- Lane
- Lincoln
- Linn
- Malheur
- Marion
- Morrow
- Multnomah
- Polk
- Sherman
- Tillamook
- Umatilla
- Union
- Wallowa
- Wasco
- Washington
- Wheeler
- Yamhill

== See also ==
- United States presidential elections in Oregon
