= 1976 United States presidential election in Oregon =

- November 2, 1976

| Nominee | Gerald Ford | Jimmy Carter |
| Party | Republican | Democratic |
| Home state | Michigan | Georgia |
| Running mate | Bob Dole | Walter Mondale |
| Electoral vote | 6 | 0 |
| Popular vote | 492,120 | 490,407 |
| Percentage | 47.78% | 47.62% |
County results
Ford
40–50%
50–60%
Carter
40–50%
50–60%
President before election
Gerald Ford
Republican
Elected President
Jimmy Carter
Democratic

The 1976 United States presidential election in Oregon took place on November 2, 1976, as part of the 1976 United States presidential election. Voters chose six representatives, or electors, to the Electoral College, who voted for president and vice president.

Oregon was narrowly won by incumbent President Gerald Ford (R–Michigan) with 47.78% of the popular vote, against Jimmy Carter (D–Georgia), with 47.62% of the popular vote. Separated by a margin of 1,713 votes, this was the closest state in the 1976 presidential election.

None of the third-party candidates amounted to a significant portion of the vote, but Eugene McCarthy (I–Minnesota) won 3.90% of the popular vote and came third overall in the nation. Despite losing in Oregon, Carter went on to win the national election and became the 39th president of the United States.

As of 2024, this is the last occasion when Crook County, Wheeler County and Linn County have voted for a Democratic presidential candidate. As of 2024, this was last time a Democrat won the presidency without carrying Oregon.

== Results ==
1976 United States presidential election in Oregon
| Party | Candidate | Votes | % |
|---|---|---|---|
| Republican | Gerald Ford (inc.) | 492,120 | 47.78% |
| Democratic | Jimmy Carter | 490,407 | 47.62% |
| Independent | Eugene McCarthy | 40,207 | 3.90% |
| Write-in (Note: Amongst these are 1,035 write-ins for national American Party candidate Thomas J. Anderson, which were not separated by county but given only as a statewide total.) | | 7,142 | 0.69% |
| Total votes | | 1,029,876 | 100% |

=== Results by county ===
| County | Gerald Ford Republican | | Jimmy Carter Democratic | | Eugene McCarthy Independent | | Various candidates Write-ins | | Margin | | Total votes cast |
| County | # | % | # | % | # | % | # | % | # | % | Total votes cast |
|---|---|---|---|---|---|---|---|---|---|---|---|
| Baker | 3,340 | 48.27% | 3,306 | 47.78% | 225 | 3.25% | 48 | 0.69% | 34 | 0.49% | 6,919 |
| Benton | 15,555 | 53.08% | 11,887 | 40.56% | 1,635 | 5.58% | 230 | 0.78% | 3,668 | 12.52% | 29,307 |
| Clackamas | 47,671 | 50.74% | 42,504 | 45.24% | 3,318 | 3.53% | 466 | 0.50% | 5,167 | 5.50% | 93,959 |
| Clatsop | 6,178 | 45.37% | 6,690 | 49.13% | 684 | 5.02% | 64 | 0.47% | -512 | -3.76% | 13,616 |
| Columbia | 5,226 | 37.71% | 8,005 | 57.76% | 521 | 3.76% | 107 | 0.77% | -2,779 | -20.05% | 13,859 |
| Coos | 9,481 | 38.35% | 14,168 | 57.30% | 924 | 3.74% | 152 | 0.61% | -4,687 | -18.95% | 24,725 |
| Crook | 2,093 | 43.81% | 2,536 | 53.09% | 102 | 2.14% | 46 | 0.96% | -443 | -9.28% | 4,777 |
| Curry | 2,962 | 45.52% | 3,227 | 49.59% | 294 | 4.52% | 24 | 0.37% | -265 | -4.07% | 6,507 |
| Deschutes | 9,054 | 46.71% | 9,480 | 48.91% | 729 | 3.76% | 119 | 0.61% | -426 | -2.20% | 19,382 |
| Douglas | 16,500 | 50.04% | 14,965 | 45.39% | 1,187 | 3.60% | 321 | 0.97% | 1,535 | 4.65% | 32,973 |
| Gilliam | 612 | 52.49% | 508 | 43.57% | 36 | 3.09% | 10 | 0.86% | 104 | 8.92% | 1,166 |
| Grant | 1,640 | 51.15% | 1,393 | 43.45% | 148 | 4.62% | 25 | 0.78% | 247 | 7.70% | 3,206 |
| Harney | 1,652 | 48.49% | 1,567 | 45.99% | 163 | 4.78% | 25 | 0.73% | 85 | 2.50% | 3,407 |
| Hood River | 3,210 | 48.37% | 3,114 | 46.93% | 287 | 4.32% | 25 | 0.38% | 96 | 1.44% | 6,636 |
| Jackson | 24,237 | 48.25% | 23,384 | 46.55% | 1,926 | 3.83% | 689 | 1.37% | 853 | 1.70% | 50,236 |
| Jefferson | 1,810 | 47.92% | 1,769 | 46.84% | 153 | 4.05% | 45 | 1.19% | 41 | 1.08% | 3,777 |
| Josephine | 10,726 | 50.81% | 9,061 | 42.92% | 899 | 4.26% | 424 | 2.01% | 1,665 | 7.89% | 21,110 |
| Klamath | 11,649 | 52.50% | 9,659 | 43.53% | 652 | 2.94% | 227 | 1.02% | 1,990 | 8.97% | 22,187 |
| Lake | 1,575 | 51.00% | 1,381 | 44.72% | 102 | 3.30% | 30 | 0.97% | 194 | 6.28% | 3,088 |
| Lane | 46,245 | 42.67% | 56,479 | 52.12% | 4,769 | 4.40% | 874 | 0.81% | -10,234 | -9.45% | 108,367 |
| Lincoln | 5,755 | 43.60% | 6,685 | 50.65% | 685 | 5.19% | 74 | 0.56% | -930 | -7.05% | 13,199 |
| Linn | 14,128 | 45.22% | 15,776 | 50.50% | 1,198 | 3.83% | 139 | 0.44% | -1,648 | -5.28% | 31,241 |
| Malheur | 5,682 | 59.13% | 3,507 | 36.49% | 368 | 3.83% | 53 | 0.55% | 2,175 | 22.64% | 9,610 |
| Marion | 35,497 | 49.08% | 33,781 | 46.70% | 2,678 | 3.70% | 375 | 0.52% | 1,716 | 2.38% | 72,331 |
| Morrow | 1,091 | 46.09% | 1,162 | 49.09% | 78 | 3.30% | 36 | 1.52% | -71 | -3.00% | 2,367 |
| Multnomah | 112,400 | 44.40% | 129,060 | 50.98% | 10,064 | 3.98% | 1,635 | 0.65% | -16,660 | -6.58% | 253,159 |
| Polk | 8,528 | 48.65% | 8,141 | 46.44% | 752 | 4.29% | 109 | 0.62% | 387 | 2.21% | 17,530 |
| Sherman | 567 | 51.13% | 491 | 44.27% | 48 | 4.33% | 3 | 0.27% | 76 | 6.86% | 1,109 |
| Tillamook | 4,033 | 45.48% | 4,456 | 50.25% | 337 | 3.80% | 41 | 0.46% | -423 | -4.77% | 8,867 |
| Umatilla | 9,345 | 51.83% | 7,985 | 44.28% | 599 | 3.33% | 102 | 0.57% | 1,360 | 7.55% | 18,031 |
| Union | 5,111 | 52.00% | 4,280 | 43.54% | 397 | 4.04% | 41 | 0.42% | 831 | 8.46% | 9,829 |
| Wallowa | 1,693 | 53.76% | 1,310 | 41.60% | 110 | 3.49% | 36 | 1.14% | 383 | 12.16% | 3,149 |
| Wasco | 4,258 | 46.08% | 4,560 | 49.35% | 350 | 3.79% | 72 | 0.78% | -302 | -3.27% | 9,240 |
| Washington | 52,376 | 57.80% | 34,847 | 38.46% | 2,999 | 3.31% | 389 | 0.43% | 17,529 | 19.34% | 90,611 |
| Wheeler | 355 | 45.57% | 402 | 51.60% | 17 | 2.18% | 5 | 0.64% | -47 | -6.03% | 779 |
| Yamhill | 9,885 | 50.38% | 8,881 | 45.27% | 773 | 3.94% | 81 | 0.41% | 1,004 | 5.11% | 19,620 |
| Totals | 492,120 | 47.78% | 490,407 | 47.62% | 40,207 | 3.90% | 7,142 | 0.69% | 1,713 | 0.16% | 1,029,876 |

==== Counties that flipped from Republican to Democratic ====
- Tillamook
- Crook
- Curry
- Deschutes
- Lane
- Lincoln
- Linn
- Morrow
- Wasco
- Wheeler

=== Results by congressional district ===
Both President Ford and Jimmy Carter won an equal amount of congressional districts in the state with Carter winning two congressional districts while Ford won the other two congressional districts.

| District | Ford | Carter |
|---|---|---|
| 1st | 56.6% | 44.4% |
| 2nd | 51.3% | 48.7% |
| 3rd | 45% | 55% |
| 4th | 47.4% | 52.6% |

== See also ==
- United States presidential elections in Oregon
