= Gilliam County, Oregon =

County in Oregon, United States

- County
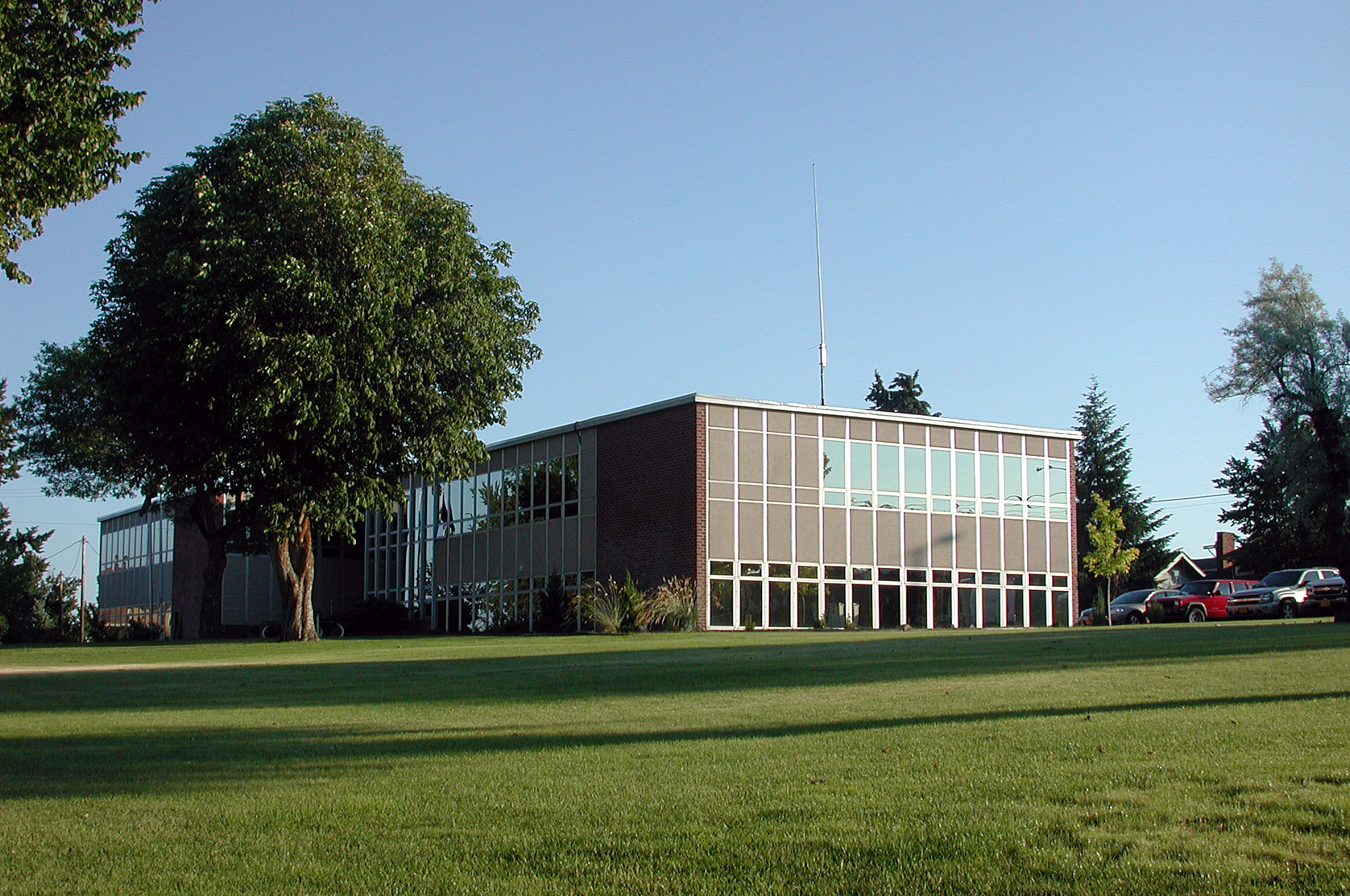
- Gilliam County Courthouse in Condon

- Location within the U.S. state of Oregon
- Coordinates: 45°23′N 120°13′W
- Country: United States
- State: Oregon
- Founded: February 25, 1885
- Named for: Cornelius Gilliam
- Seat: Condon
- Largest city: Condon

Area
  - Total: 1,223 sq mi (3,170 km^{2})
  - Land: 1,205 sq mi (3,120 km^{2})
  - Water: 18 sq mi (47 km^{2}) 1.5%

Population (2020)
  - Total: 1,995
  - Estimate (2025): 1,971 ▼
  - Density: 1.656/sq mi (0.6392/km^{2})
- Congressional district: 2nd
- Website: www.gilliamcountyor.gov

Gilliam County is one of the 36 counties in the U.S. state of Oregon. As of the 2020 census, the population was 1,995, making it the third-least populous county in Oregon. The county seat is Condon. The county was established in 1885 and is named for Cornelius Gilliam, a colonel who commanded the forces of the provisional government of Oregon after the Whitman Massacre.

== History ==
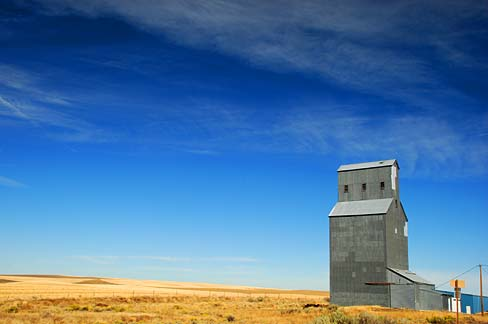
Old grain elevator in Gwendolen, in Gilliam County

The Oregon Legislative Assembly created Gilliam County on February 25, 1885, from the eastern third of Wasco County after residents complained that they were too far from their county seat in The Dalles. The first Gilliam county seat was at Alkali, now Arlington. The question of a permanent county seat was placed on general election ballots in 1886, 1888, and again in 1890, when voters chose to move the county seat to Condon, known to early settlers as "Summit Springs." Once the question of the location of the county seat was settled, voters in Gilliam County proved reluctant to provide a courthouse in Condon. The county government operated out of a two-room house until 1903, when the county court appropriated money to construct a courthouse. This courthouse burned down in 1954 and was replaced the following year with the current courthouse.

The Shepherds Flat Wind Farm, an 845 megawatt (MW) wind farm, began construction near Arlington in 2009, shortly after approval by state regulators. The wind farm was being built by Caithness Energy using General Electric (GE) 2.5 MW wind turbines, and it will supply electricity to Southern California Edison. In April 2011, Google announced they had invested $100 million in the project. The wind farm was estimated to have an economic impact of $16 million annually for Oregon.

== Geography ==
Map of Gilliam County

Gilliam County is located in the central northern part of Oregon, east of the Cascade Range. While its southern and eastern borders are defined by its neighboring counties, its western border is defined by the John Day River and its northern border is defined by the Columbia River. Most of the county is mostly flat, but contains various canyons created by streams from the Blue Mountains.

According to the United States Census Bureau, the county has a total area of 1,223 square miles (3,170 km^{2}), of which 1,205 square miles (3,120 km^{2}) is land and 18 square miles (47 km^{2}) (1.5%) is water.

=== Adjacent counties ===
- Klickitat County, Washington - north
- Morrow County - east
- Wheeler County - south
- Wasco County - southwest
- Sherman County - west

== Demographics ==
Historical population
Census	Pop.	Note	%±
1890	3,600		—
1900	3,201		−11.1%
1910	3,701		15.6%
1920	3,960		7.0%
1930	3,467		−12.4%
1940	2,844		−18.0%
1950	2,817		−0.9%
1960	3,069		8.9%
1970	2,342		−23.7%
1980	2,057		−12.2%
1990	1,717		−16.5%
2000	1,915		11.5%
2010	1,871		−2.3%
2020	1,995		6.6%
2025 (est.)	1,971	▼	−1.2%
U.S. Decennial Census; 1790–1960 1900–1990; 1990–2000 2010–2020

=== 2020 census ===
Gilliam County, Oregon – Racial and ethnic composition Note: the US Census treats Hispanic/Latino as an ethnic category. This table excludes Latinos from the racial categories and assigns them to a separate category. Hispanics/Latinos may be of any race.
Race / Ethnicity (NH = Non-Hispanic)	Pop 1980	Pop 1990	Pop 2000	Pop 2010	Pop 2020	% 1980	% 1990	% 2000	% 2010	% 2020
White alone (NH)	1,961	1,668	1,839	1,725	1,747	95.33%	97.15%	96.03%	92.20%	87.57%
Black or African American alone (NH)	0	0	3	3	3	0.00%	0.00%	0.16%	0.16%	0.15%
Native American or Alaska Native alone (NH)	9	10	16	18	29	0.44%	0.58%	0.84%	0.96%	1.45%
Asian alone (NH)	3	9	3	3	6	0.15%	0.52%	0.16%	0.16%	0.30%
Native Hawaiian or Pacific Islander alone (NH)	x	x	0	13	9	x	x	0.00%	0.69%	0.45%
Other race alone (NH)	31	0	1	0	3	1.51%	0.00%	0.05%	0.00%	0.15%
Mixed race or Multiracial (NH)	x	x	18	21	91	x	x	0.94%	1.12%	4.56%
Hispanic or Latino (any race)	53	30	35	88	107	2.58%	1.75%	1.83%	4.70%	5.36%
Total	2,057	1,717	1,915	1,871	1,995	100.00%	100.00%	100.00%	100.00%	100.00%

=== American Community Survey 2025 data ===
The United States Census Bureau estimated that in 2025, Gilliam County’s population was 1.971. It was also estimated that the county's population was 83,36% Non-Hispanic White, 7,76% Hispanic or Latino, 0,51% Non-Hispanic Black, 0,86% Asian, 1,88% Native American, 0,10% Pacific Islander, and 5,53% Multiracial.

Total	Population	Percentage
Non-Hispanic White	1.643	83,36%
Hispanic or Latino	153	7,76%
Non-Hispanic Black	10	0,51%
Asian	17	0,86%
Native American	37	1,88%
Pacific Islander	2	0,10%
Non-Hispanic Multiracial	109	5,53%

As of the 2020 census, the county had a population of 1,995. Of the residents, 20.0% were under the age of 18 and 27.1% were 65 years of age or older; the median age was 48.0 years. For every 100 females there were 105.2 males, and for every 100 females age 18 and over there were 99.7 males. 0.0% of residents lived in urban areas and 100.0% lived in rural areas.

The racial makeup of the county was 88.7% White, 0.2% Black or African American, 1.5% American Indian and Alaska Native, 0.5% Asian, 0.6% Native Hawaiian and Pacific Islander, 1.4% from some other race, and 7.3% from two or more races. Hispanic or Latino residents of any race comprised 5.4% of the population.

There were 866 households in the county, of which 29.4% had children under the age of 18 living with them and 25.4% had a female householder with no spouse or partner present. About 28.8% of all households were made up of individuals and 15.4% had someone living alone who was 65 years of age or older.

There were 1,095 housing units, of which 20.9% were vacant. Among occupied housing units, 71.0% were owner-occupied and 29.0% were renter-occupied. The homeowner vacancy rate was 1.5% and the rental vacancy rate was 12.5%.

=== 2010 census ===
As of the 2010 census, there were 1,871 people, 864 households, and 508 families living in the county. The population density was 1.6 inhabitants per square mile (0.62 inhabitants/km^{2}). There were 1,156 housing units at an average density of 1.0 units per square mile (0.39 units/km^{2}). The racial makeup of the county was 95.2% white, 1.0% American Indian, 0.7% Pacific islander, 0.2% Asian, 0.2% black or African American, 1.4% from other races, and 1.4% from two or more races. Those of Hispanic or Latino origin made up 4.7% of the population. In terms of ancestry, 28.4% were German, 18.5% were English, 15.5% were Irish, and 8.3% were American.

Of the 864 households, 22.5% had children under the age of 18 living with them, 48.4% were married couples living together, 6.4% had a female householder with no husband present, 41.2% were non-families, and 35.6% of all households were made up of individuals. The average household size was 2.14 and the average family size was 2.74. The median age was 49.7 years.

The median income for a household in the county was $42,148 and the median income for a family was $52,885. Males had a median income of $34,340 versus $35,962 for females. The per capita income for the county was $25,559. About 9.8% of families and 10.6% of the population were below the poverty line, including 18.3% of those under age 18 and 10.8% of those age 65 or over.

=== 2000 census ===
As of the 2000 census, there were 1,915 people, 819 households, and 543 families living in the county. The population density was 2 people per square mile (0.77 people/km^{2}). There were 1,043 housing units at an average density of 1 units per square mile (0.39/km^{2}). The racial makeup of the county was 96.76% White, 0.16% Black or African American, 0.84% Native American, 0.16% Asian, 1.15% from other races, and 0.94% from two or more races. 1.83% of the population were Hispanic or Latino of any race. 18.2% were of German, 18.1% American, 12.6% English, 12.5% Irish and 5.3% Scottish ancestry.

There were 819 households, out of which 27.60% had children under the age of 18 living with them, 57.90% were married couples living together, 5.90% had a female householder with no husband present, and 33.60% were non-families. 29.50% of all households were made up of individuals, and 12.10% had someone living alone who was 65 years of age or older. The average household size was 2.31 and the average family size was 2.85.

In the county, the population was spread out, with 23.20% under the age of 18, 5.40% from 18 to 24, 25.60% from 25 to 44, 26.70% from 45 to 64, and 19.10% who were 65 years of age or older. The median age was 43 years. For every 100 females there were 102.20 males. For every 100 females age 18 and over, there were 96.30 males.

The median income for a household in the county was $33,611, and the median income for a family was $41,477. Males had a median income of $30,915 versus $20,852 for females. The per capita income for the county was $17,659. About 6.70% of families and 9.10% of the population were below the poverty line, including 11.00% of those under age 18 and 6.60% of those age 65 or over.

== Communities ==
=== Cities ===
- Arlington
- Condon (county seat)
- Lonerock

=== Unincorporated communities ===
- Clem
- Gwendolen
- Mayville
- Mikkalo
- Olex
- Rock Creek

=== Former communities ===
- Ajax
- Barnett
- Blalock
- Heppner Junction
- Montague
- Quinton
- Rhea
- Shutler

== Government and infrastructure ==
The Northern Oregon Regional Corrections Facility (Norcor), a short-term jail, serves Gilliam, Hood River, Sherman, and Wasco counties.

== Politics ==

Though Gilliam County is located in central Oregon, politically it falls in line with the eastern side of the state. The majority of registered voters who are part of a political party in Gilliam County, as well as most counties in eastern Oregon, are members of the Republican Party. The last time a Democrat carried a clear majority of the votes in Gilliam was in 1964 with Lyndon Johnson, though Bill Clinton was able to win it by a plurality in 1996 and had lost it by just three votes in 1992. In the 2008 presidential election, 58.38% of Gilliam County voters voted for Republican John McCain, while 38.74% voted for Democrat Barack Obama and 2.88% of voters either voted for a Third Party candidate or wrote in a candidate. These numbers show a small but clear shift towards the Democratic candidate when compared to the 2004 presidential election, in which 66.3% of Gilliam Country voters voted for George W. Bush, while 32.5% voted for John Kerry, and 1.2% of voters either voted for a third-party candidate or wrote in a candidate.

Despite its Republican lean, Gilliam County has still been willing to vote for Democrats at the state level; for example, Senator Ron Wyden won the county in the 1998, 2004, 2010, and 2016 elections. This streak, however, ended in 2022 when Republican Jo Rae Perkins won most of the county's votes.

United States presidential election results for Gilliam County, Oregon
Year	Republican		Democratic		Third party(ies)	
Year	No.	%	No.	%	No.	%
1904	568	67.46%	195	23.16%	79	9.38%
1908	470	61.92%	242	31.88%	47	6.19%
1912	348	40.51%	310	36.09%	201	23.40%
1916	557	37.89%	870	59.18%	43	2.93%
1920	821	60.59%	498	36.75%	36	2.66%
1924	738	50.20%	521	35.44%	211	14.35%
1928	880	62.50%	515	36.58%	13	0.92%
1932	470	35.00%	854	63.59%	19	1.41%
1936	362	25.66%	983	69.67%	66	4.68%
1940	518	39.63%	785	60.06%	4	0.31%
1944	492	46.42%	567	53.49%	1	0.09%
1948	623	52.62%	544	45.95%	17	1.44%
1952	911	68.55%	415	31.23%	3	0.23%
1956	793	59.58%	538	40.42%	0	0.00%
1960	712	54.02%	606	45.98%	0	0.00%
1964	442	36.23%	775	63.52%	3	0.25%
1968	619	55.27%	436	38.93%	65	5.80%
1972	665	62.21%	355	33.21%	49	4.58%
1976	612	52.49%	508	43.57%	46	3.95%
1980	622	54.56%	394	34.56%	124	10.88%
1984	700	65.24%	369	34.39%	4	0.37%
1988	470	52.40%	417	46.49%	10	1.11%
1992	377	36.32%	374	36.03%	287	27.65%
1996	398	38.27%	485	46.63%	157	15.10%
2000	679	62.29%	359	32.94%	52	4.77%
2004	755	66.34%	370	32.51%	13	1.14%
2008	648	58.38%	430	38.74%	32	2.88%
2012	639	60.23%	371	34.97%	51	4.81%
2016	671	65.85%	239	23.45%	109	10.70%
2020	834	70.80%	324	27.50%	20	1.70%
2024	805	70.99%	291	25.66%	38	3.35%

== Economy ==
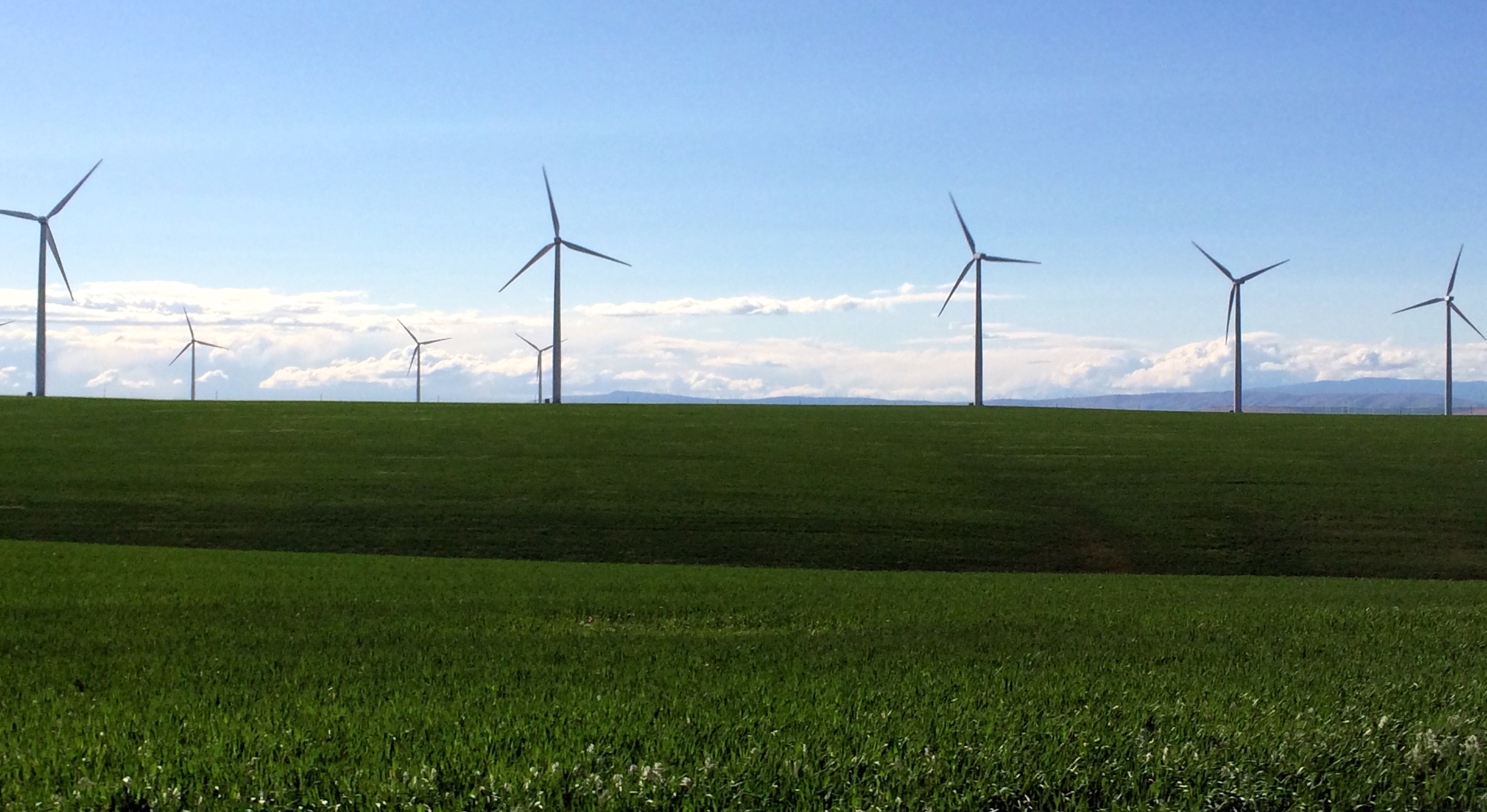
The view westward of a wheat field off Highway 19

Gilliam County is in the heart of the Columbia River Plateau wheat-growing region. The economy is based on agriculture, and wheat, barley and beef cattle are the principal products. Properties are large, with an average farm size of about 4,200 acres (17 km^{2}).

The largest individual employers in the county are two subsidiaries of Waste Management Inc., Chemical Waste Management of the Northwest and Oregon Waste Systems, Inc., who run two regional waste disposal landfills. By levying a fee of $1 a ton, Gilliam County receives enough money to pay the first $500 of the property tax bills of its inhabitants, an amount that covers the full tax bill for almost half of the county inhabitants, as well as funding other county projects.

Hunting, fishing and tourism are secondary industries. Transportation also contributes to the local economy; two major rivers, the John Day and Columbia, cross the area east-to-west, as does Interstate 84. Oregon Route 19 connects the county's major cities north-to-south and provides access to the John Day Valley.

== See also ==
- National Register of Historic Places listings in Gilliam County, Oregon
