= Mikkalo, Oregon =

Unincorporated community in the state of Oregon, United States

Coordinates: 45°28′15″N 120°14′05″W

Mikkalo is an unincorporated community in Gilliam County, Oregon, United States, at an elevation of 1,470 feet (450 m). Mikkalo is about 4 miles (6.4 km) northwest of Clem. Mikkalo has a post office, serving ZIP code of 97861, and is in the 541 area code region. In 1905, the place was named for settler John Mikkalo, and a post office opened at Mikkalo in 1907. It was along the Condon Branch of the Union Pacific Railroad. The Mikkalo Farmers Elevator had a fire on March 28, 1921.

This region experiences warm (but not hot) and dry summers, with no average monthly temperatures above 71.6 °F (22.0 °C). According to the Köppen Climate Classification system, Mikkalo has a warm-summer Mediterranean climate, abbreviated "Csb" on climate maps.
