= Clem, Oregon =

Unincorporated community in the state of Oregon, United States

Coordinates: 45°25′16″N 120°12′12″W

Clem is an unincorporated community in Gilliam County, Oregon, United States, at an elevation of 1,903 feet (580 m). It was named after Clemens Augustus Danneman, who was born in Germany, came to Oregon in 1879, and owned a ranch in Gilliam County. The Clem post office was open between November 1884 and April 1937. Clem "also was a station on the Condon branch of the Union Pacific Railroad." Now, Clem is on Oregon Route 19 about 4 miles (6.4 km) southeast of Mikkalo.
