= 1904 United States presidential election in Oregon =

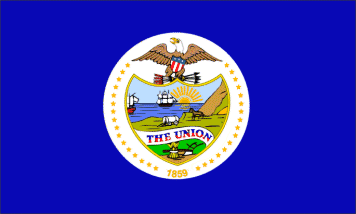
- November 8, 1904
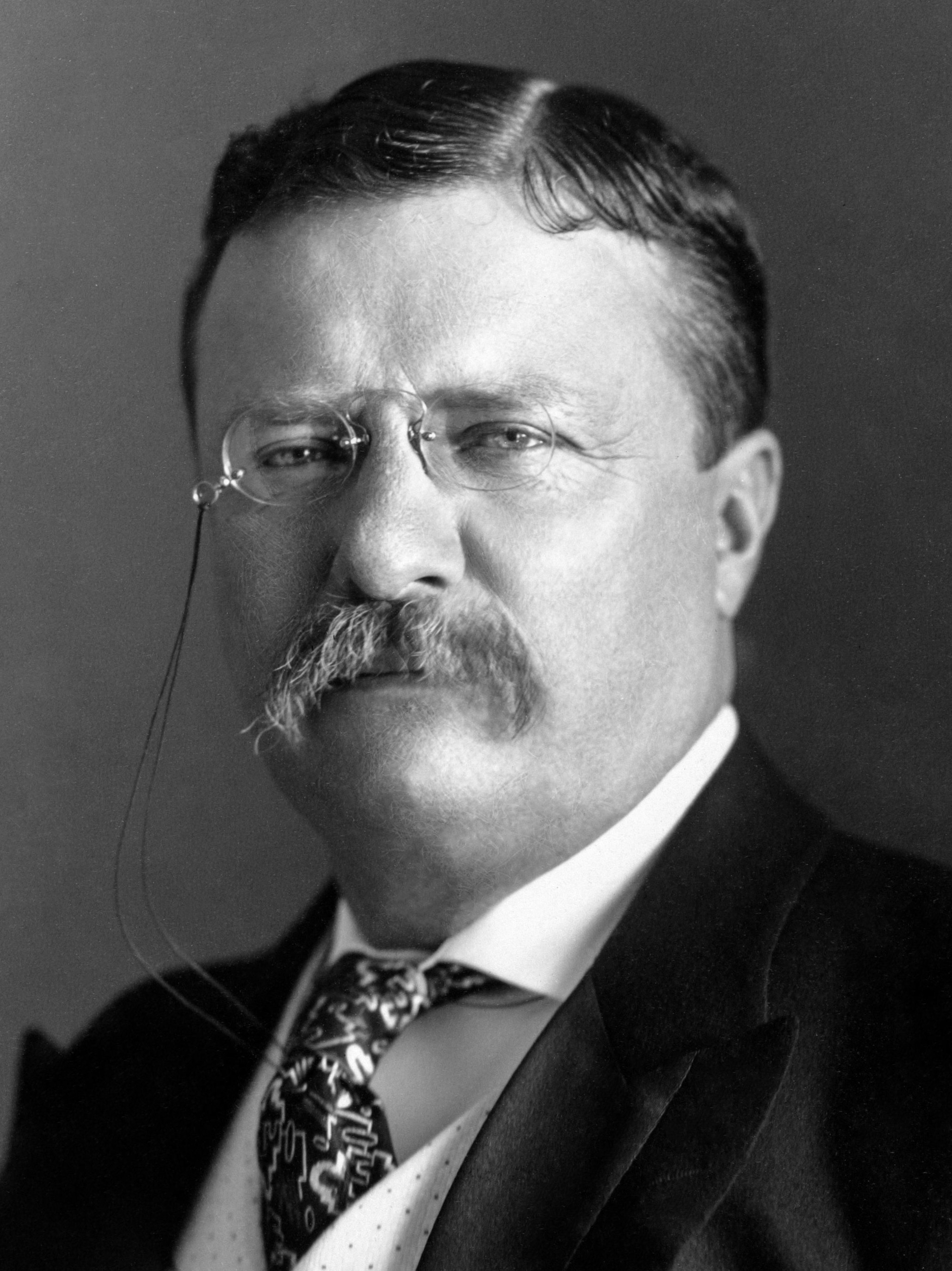

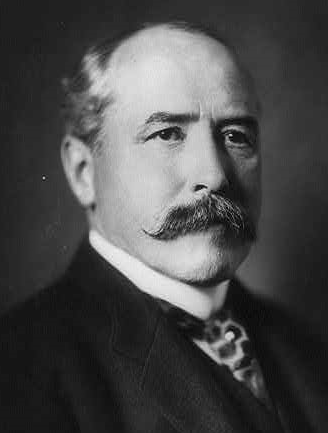

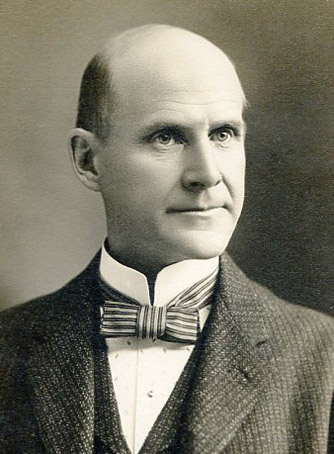
Nominee	Theodore Roosevelt	Alton B. Parker	Eugene V. Debs
Party	Republican	Democratic	Socialist
Home state	New York	New York	Indiana
Running mate	Charles W. Fairbanks	Henry G. Davis	Ben Hanford
Electoral vote	4	0	0
Popular vote	60,455	17,521	7,619
Percentage	67.06%	19.43%	8.45%
County results
Roosevelt
50–60%
60–70%
70–80%
President before election
Theodore Roosevelt
Republican
Elected President
Theodore Roosevelt
Republican

The 1904 United States presidential election in Oregon took place on November 8, 1904. State voters chose four electors to the Electoral College, which selected the president and vice president.

== Campaign ==
President Roosevelt was extremely popular in Oregon because of his policies of reforming the railroads, creating a Department of Commerce and Labor and conservation of the forests that were at the time heavily exploited by large businesses. Parker's re-emphasis on the Gold Standard, which harked back to Grover Cleveland, aroused little enthusiasm in Oregon. Nor did his opposition to Roosevelt's policy of imperialism in the Pacific, with the result that Parker's showing was the worst-ever by any major-party nominee in Oregon except for his mentor Cleveland twelve years previously. At the same time, Roosevelt's performance remains the best ever by any presidential candidate since Oregon's statehood in 1859. Parker did not win more than thirty percent of the vote in a single county, and overall took just a little over nineteen percent of Oregon's ballots, 18% below his national result and a 20% drop from Democratic performance in 1900.

Socialist nominee Eugene V. Debs, whose campaign focused on trust-busting and the opposition to monopolies, traveled all around the nation in a influential campaign that netted him over four hundred thousand votes nationwide. Although he did not outpoll Parker in any Oregon county, Debs nonetheless received over eight percent of the vote, 5.5% higher than his national performance.

== Results ==
1904 United States presidential election in Oregon
Party	Candidate	Votes	Percentage	Electoral votes
Republican	Theodore Roosevelt (incumbent)	60,455	67.06%	4
Democratic	Alton B. Parker	17,521	19.43%	0
Socialist	Eugene V. Debs	7,619	8.45%	0
Prohibition	Silas C. Swallow	3,806	4.22%	0
Populist	Thomas E. Watson	753	0.84%	0
Totals		90,154	100.00%	4
Voter turnout				—

=== Results by county ===
County	Theodore Roosevelt Republican		Alton B. Parker Democratic		Eugene V. Debs Socialist		Silas C. Swallow Prohibition		Thomas E. Watson Populist		Margin		Total votes cast
County	#	%	#	%	#	%	#	%	#	%	#	%	Total votes cast
Baker	1,990	59.76%	938	28.17%	335	10.06%	52	1.56%	15	0.45%	1,052	31.59%	3,330
Benton	1,107	62.51%	442	24.96%	74	4.18%	136	7.68%	12	0.68%	665	37.55%	1,771
Clackamas	2,783	67.78%	684	16.66%	421	10.25%	141	3.43%	77	1.88%	2,099	51.12%	4,106
Clatsop	1,408	68.68%	336	16.39%	256	12.49%	41	2.00%	9	0.44%	1,072	52.29%	2,050
Columbia	1,301	74.26%	221	12.61%	160	9.13%	61	3.48%	9	0.51%	1,080	61.64%	1,752
Coos	1,712	64.26%	490	18.39%	342	12.84%	92	3.45%	28	1.05%	1,222	45.87%	2,664
Crook	763	65.33%	266	22.77%	116	9.93%	16	1.37%	7	0.60%	497	42.55%	1,168
Curry	322	70.77%	87	19.12%	38	8.35%	5	1.10%	3	0.66%	235	51.65%	455
Douglas	2,443	63.21%	908	23.49%	387	10.01%	95	2.46%	32	0.83%	1,535	39.72%	3,865
Gilliam	568	67.46%	195	23.16%	48	5.70%	28	3.33%	3	0.36%	373	44.30%	842
Grant	1,007	67.81%	316	21.28%	123	8.28%	32	2.15%	7	0.47%	691	46.53%	1,485
Harney	395	58.35%	190	28.06%	80	11.82%	7	1.03%	5	0.74%	205	30.28%	677
Jackson	1,992	61.16%	798	24.50%	307	9.43%	133	4.08%	27	0.83%	1,194	36.66%	3,257
Josephine	914	60.89%	327	21.79%	208	13.86%	47	3.13%	5	0.33%	587	39.11%	1,501
Klamath	552	68.74%	208	25.90%	25	3.11%	10	1.25%	8	1.00%	344	42.84%	803
Lake	394	74.20%	115	21.66%	4	0.75%	9	1.69%	9	1.69%	279	52.54%	531
Lane	3,501	65.88%	1,166	21.94%	365	6.87%	232	4.37%	50	0.94%	2,335	43.94%	5,314
Lincoln	581	64.84%	179	19.98%	118	13.17%	14	1.56%	4	0.45%	402	44.87%	896
Linn	2,346	54.36%	1,206	27.94%	409	9.48%	286	6.63%	69	1.60%	1,140	26.41%	4,316
Malheur	799	63.82%	280	22.36%	74	5.91%	77	6.15%	22	1.76%	519	41.45%	1,252
Marion	4,106	70.03%	1,084	18.49%	297	5.07%	312	5.32%	64	1.09%	3,022	51.54%	5,863
Morrow	875	65.10%	230	17.11%	156	11.61%	78	5.80%	5	0.37%	645	47.99%	1,344
Multnomah	13,692	73.88%	2,324	12.54%	1,849	9.98%	592	3.19%	77	0.42%	11,368	61.34%	18,534
Polk	1,380	63.65%	521	24.03%	122	5.63%	118	5.44%	27	1.25%	859	39.62%	2,168
Sherman	701	71.10%	163	16.53%	32	3.25%	86	8.72%	4	0.41%	538	54.56%	986
Tillamook	729	69.49%	136	12.96%	119	11.34%	65	6.20%	0	0.00%	593	56.53%	1,049
Umatilla	2,642	66.27%	840	21.07%	259	6.50%	223	5.59%	23	0.58%	1,802	45.20%	3,987
Union	1,884	62.88%	775	25.87%	202	6.74%	116	3.87%	19	0.63%	1,109	37.02%	2,996
Wallowa	714	64.32%	255	22.97%	99	8.92%	34	3.06%	8	0.72%	459	41.35%	1,110
Wasco	2,092	67.33%	536	17.25%	228	7.34%	222	7.15%	29	0.93%	1,556	50.08%	3,107
Washington	2,296	73.19%	492	15.68%	139	4.43%	151	4.81%	59	1.88%	1,804	57.51%	3,137
Wheeler	462	69.58%	161	24.25%	22	3.31%	12	1.81%	7	1.05%	301	45.33%	664
Yamhill	2,004	63.14%	652	20.54%	214	6.74%	283	8.92%	21	0.66%	1,352	42.60%	3,174
Totals	60,455	67.06%	17,521	19.43%	7,628	8.46%	3,806	4.22%	744	0.83%	42,934	47.62%	90,154

== Aftermath ==
This election would solidify Oregon as a one-party Republican bastion, which it would remain at a presidential level, apart from the 1912 Republican-progressive split, until Franklin D. Roosevelt was elected in 1932. After this election, Democratic representation in the Oregon legislature would never exceed fifteen percent until 1954, with the exception of a brief period in the 1930s and no Democrat other than Woodrow Wilson would henceforth carry even one county in the state until the Great Depression. Republican primaries would become the chief mode of competition: indeed Oregon became in this election year the first Western state to utilize the direct primary.

== See also ==
- United States presidential elections in Oregon
