= 1868 United States presidential election in Oregon =

- November 3, 1868
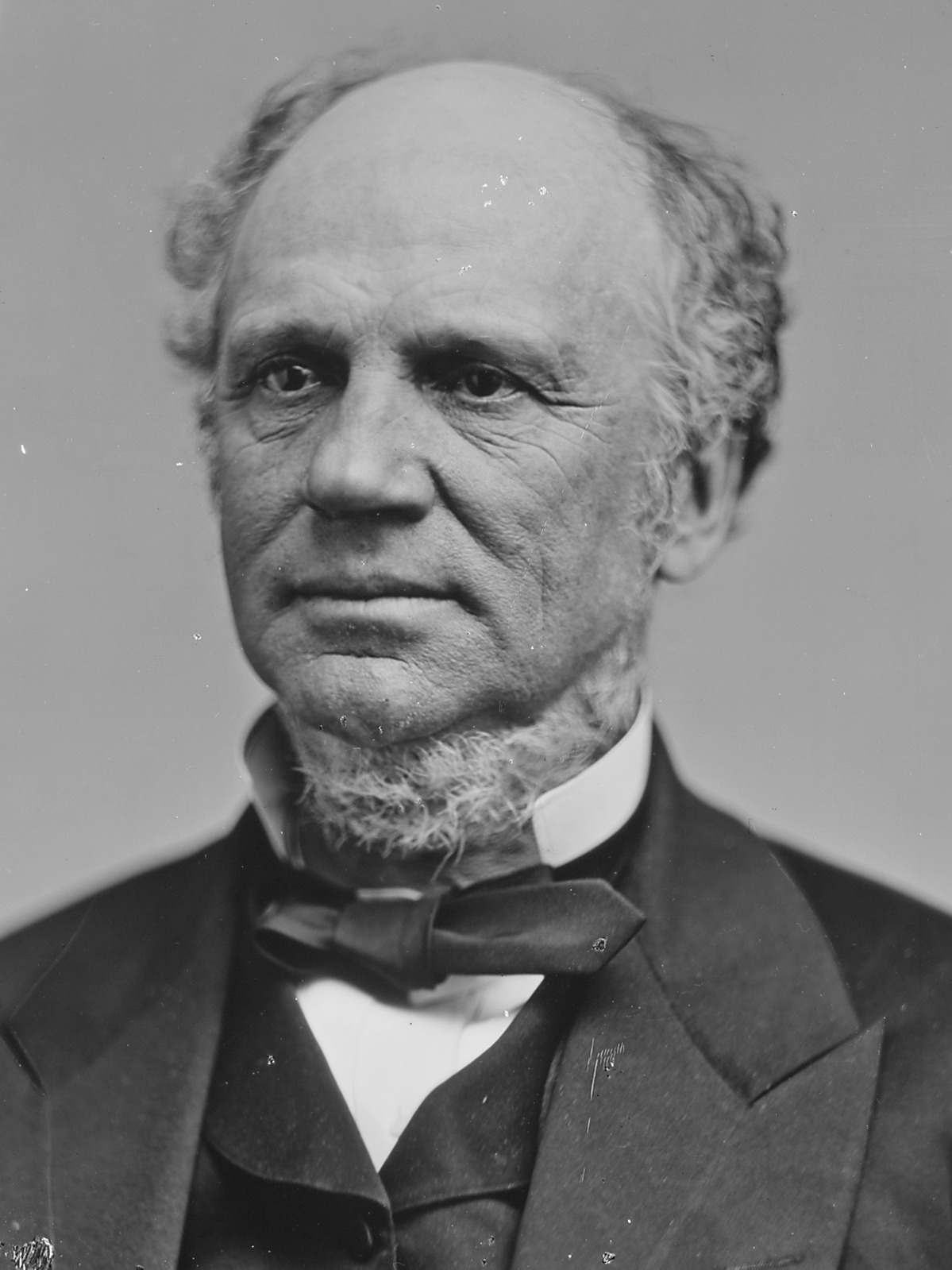

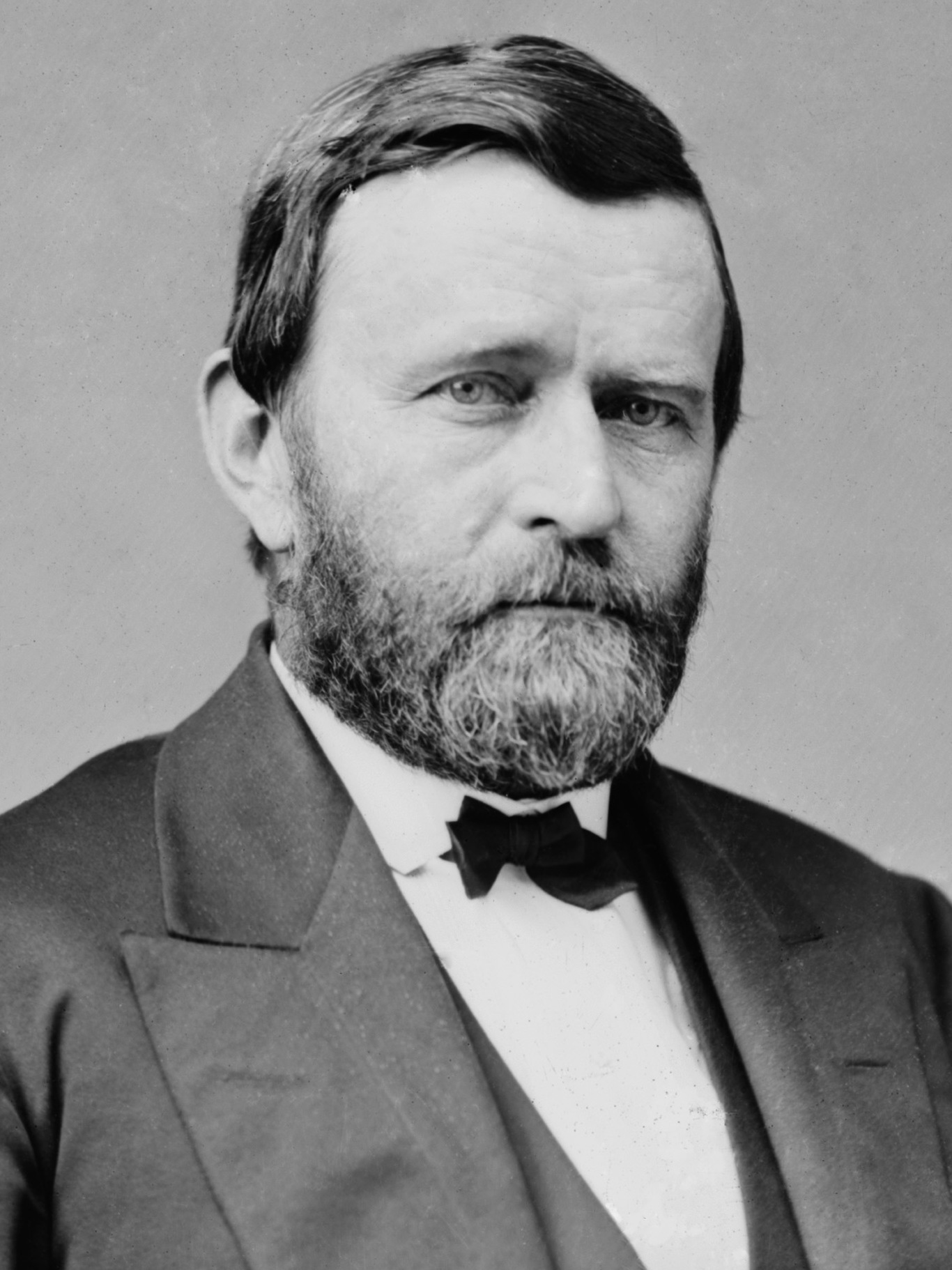
Nominee	Horatio Seymour	Ulysses S. Grant
Party	Democratic	Republican
Home state	New York	Illinois
Running mate	Francis Preston Blair Jr.	Schuyler Colfax
Electoral vote	3	0
Popular vote	11,125	10,961
Percentage	50.37%	49.63%
County results
Seymour
50–60%
60–70%
Grant
50–60%
60–70%
70–80%
President before election
Andrew Johnson
Democratic
Elected President
Ulysses S. Grant
Republican

The 1868 United States presidential election in Oregon took place on November 3, 1868, as part of the 1868 United States presidential election. Voters chose three representatives, or electors to the Electoral College, who voted for president and vice president.

Oregon voted for the Democratic nominee, Horatio Seymour over the Republican nominee, Ulysses S. Grant. Seymour won the state by a narrow margin of 0.74%.

As a result of his win, Seymour became the first Democratic presidential candidate to ever win Oregon. Another Democrat would not win Oregon again on a presidential level until Woodrow Wilson won the state in 1912. Democrats wouldn't again win a majority in Oregon until Franklin D. Roosevelt won the state in 1932.

This was the only time a Republican would win a presidential election without Oregon until 1988, 120 years later; every Republican since then has lost the state.

== Results ==
1868 United States presidential election in Oregon
Party	Candidate	Running mate	Popular vote		Electoral vote	
Party	Candidate	Running mate	Count	%	Count	%
Democratic	Horatio Seymour of New York	Francis Preston Blair Jr. of Missouri	11,125	50.37%	3	100.00%
Republican	Ulysses S. Grant of Illinois	Schuyler Colfax of Indiana	10,961	49.63%	0	0.00%
Total			22,086	100.00%	3	100.00%

== See also ==
- United States presidential elections in Oregon
