= 1912 United States presidential election in Oregon =

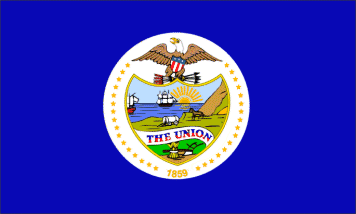
- November 5, 1912

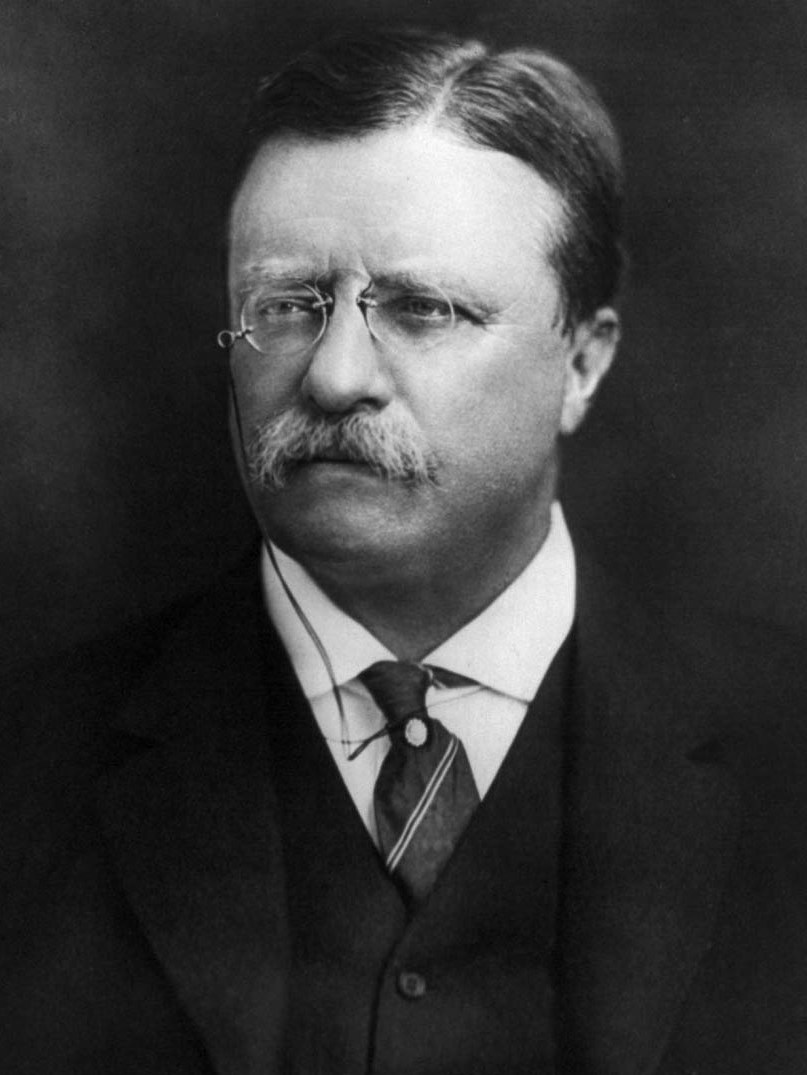

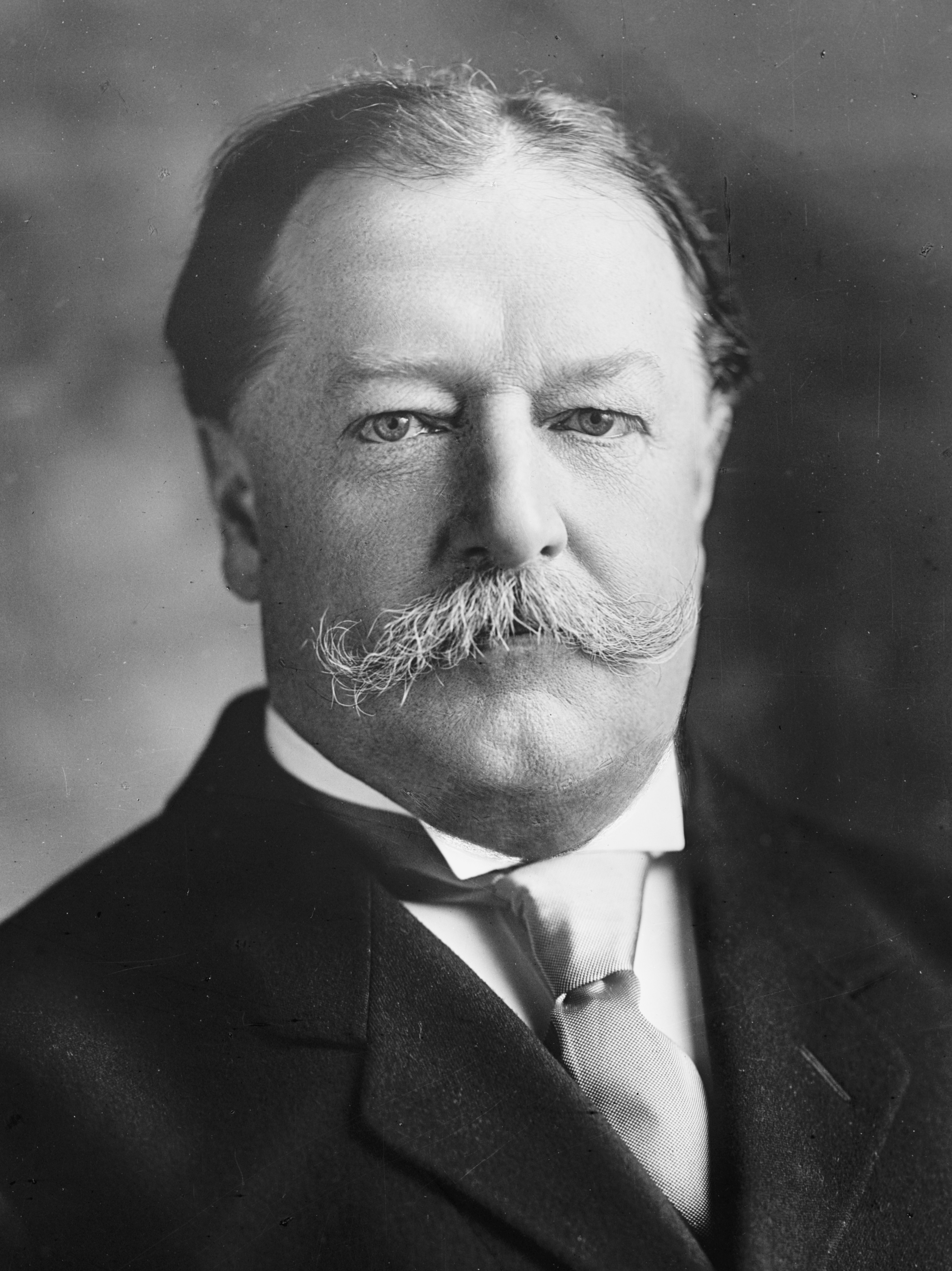

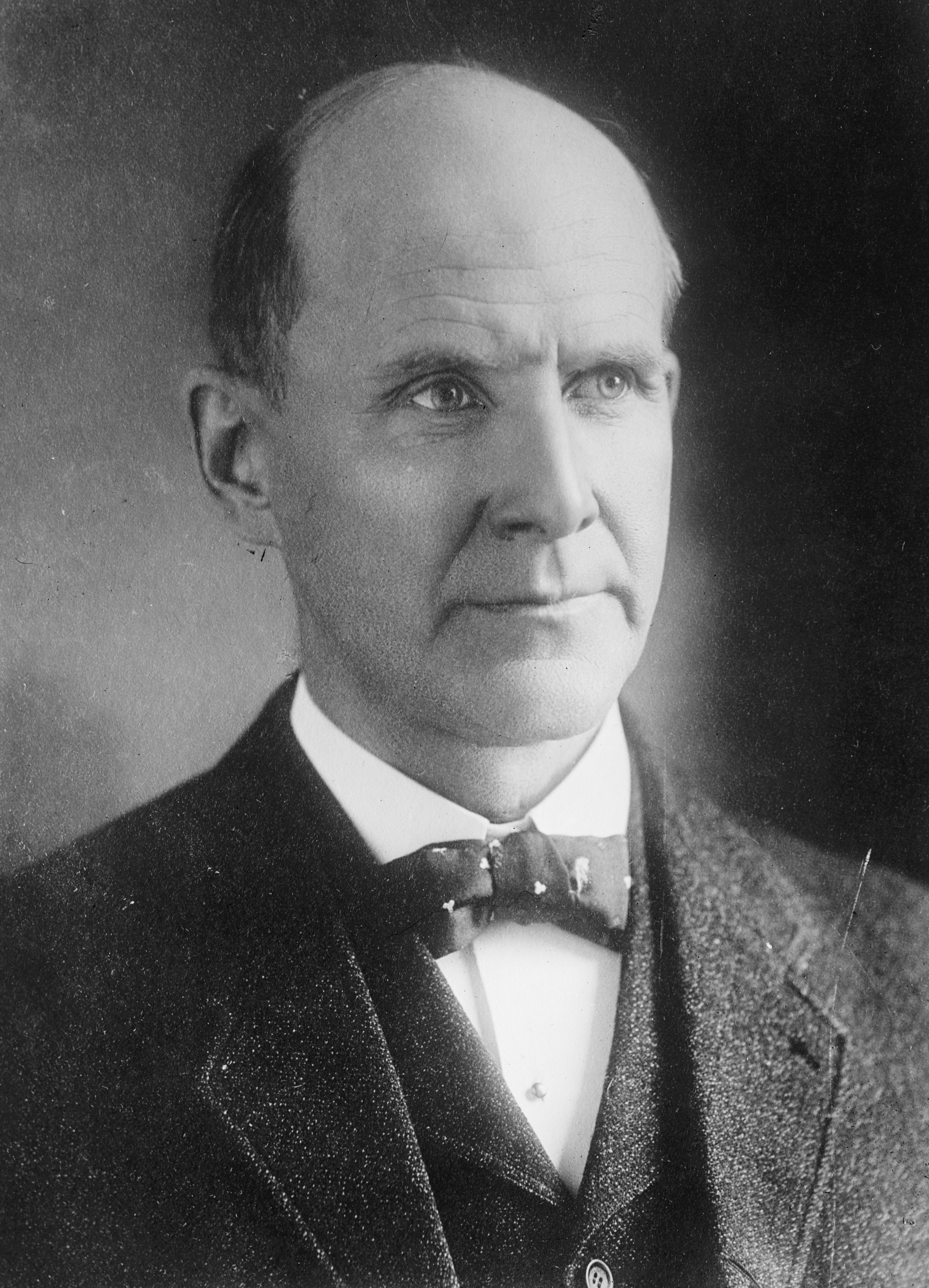
Nominee	Woodrow Wilson	Theodore Roosevelt
Party	Democratic	Progressive (Bull Moose)
Home state	New Jersey	New York
Running mate	Thomas R. Marshall	Hiram Johnson
Electoral vote	5	0
Popular vote	47,064	37,600
Percentage	34.34%	27.44%
Nominee	William Howard Taft	Eugene V. Debs
Party	Republican	Socialist
Home state	Ohio	Indiana
Running mate	Nicholas Murray Butler	Emil Seidel
Electoral vote	0	0
Popular vote	34,673	13,343
Percentage	25.30%	9.74%
County results
Wilson
20–30%
30–40%
40–50%
Roosevelt
20–30%
30–40%
Taft
30–40%
40–50%
President before election
William Howard Taft
Republican
Elected President
Woodrow Wilson
Democratic

The 1912 United States presidential election in Oregon took place on November 5, 1912, as part of the 1912 United States presidential election. State voters chose five representatives, or electors, to the Electoral College, who voted for president and vice president.

Oregon was won by Princeton University President Woodrow Wilson (D–Virginia), running with governor of Indiana Thomas R. Marshall, with 34.34% of the popular vote, against the 26th president of the United States Theodore Roosevelt (P–New York), running with California Governor Hiram Johnson, with 27.44% of the popular vote, the 27th president of the United States William Howard Taft (R–Ohio), running with Columbia University President Nicholas Murray Butler, with 25.30% of the popular vote and the five-time candidate of the Socialist Party of America for President of the United States Eugene V. Debs (S–Indiana), running with the first Socialist mayor of a major city in the United States Emil Seidel, with 9.74% of the popular vote.

As a result of his win, Wilson became the first Democratic presidential candidate since Horatio Seymour in 1868 to win Oregon. As of the 2020 presidential election, this is the only election where Oregon voted Democratic while neighboring Washington did not.

== Results ==
1912 United States presidential election in Oregon
Party	Candidate	Votes	%
Democratic	Woodrow Wilson	47,064	34.34%
Progressive	Theodore Roosevelt	37,600	27.44%
Republican	William Howard Taft (incumbent)	34,673	25.30%
Socialist	Eugene V. Debs	13,343	9.74%
Prohibition	Eugene Chafin	4,360	3.18%
Total votes		137,040	100%

=== Results by county ===
County	Woodrow Wilson Democratic		William Howard Taft Republican		Theodore Roosevelt Progressive "Bull Moose"		Eugene V. Debs Socialist		Eugene Chafin Prohibition		Margin (Note: Because Roosevelt ran second behind Wilson and ahead of Taft, all margins given are Wilson vote minus Roosevelt vote, and percentage margin Wilson percentage minus Roosevelt percentage, unless otherwise noted.)		Total votes cast
County	#	%	#	%	#	%	#	%	#	%	#	%	Total votes cast
Baker	1,395	37.85%	648	17.58%	1,120	30.39%	469	12.72%	54	1.47%	275	7.46%	3,686
Benton	986	37.82%	715	27.43%	588	22.55%	123	4.72%	195	7.48%	271 (Note: In this county where Roosevelt did run behind Taft, margin given is Wilson vote minus Taft vote and percentage margin Wilson percentage minus Taft percentage.)	10.40%	2,607
Clackamas	2,171	33.24%	1,503	23.01%	2,045	31.31%	578	8.85%	235	3.60%	126	1.93%	6,532
Clatsop	728	27.20%	722	26.98%	729	27.24%	446	16.67%	51	1.91%	-1	-0.04%	2,676
Columbia	507	24.78%	574	28.05%	611	29.86%	295	14.42%	59	2.88%	-37 (Note: In this county where Wilson ran third behind Taft and Roosevelt, margin given is Taft vote minus Roosevelt vote and percentage margin Taft percentage minus Roosevelt percentage.)	-1.81%	2,046
Coos	1,081	29.56%	701	19.17%	949	25.95%	837	22.89%	89	2.43%	132	3.61%	3,657
Crook	1,060	37.99%	770	27.60%	608	21.79%	289	10.36%	63	2.26%	290	10.39%	2,790
Curry	219	36.14%	102	16.83%	192	31.68%	89	14.69%	4	0.66%	27	4.46%	606
Douglas	1,601	32.90%	1,267	26.04%	1,224	25.15%	658	13.52%	116	2.38%	334	6.86%	4,866
Gilliam	310	36.09%	348	40.51%	150	17.46%	35	4.07%	16	1.86%	-38	-4.42%	859
Grant	413	30.37%	418	30.74%	348	25.59%	167	12.28%	14	1.03%	-5	-0.37%	1,360
Harney	538	43.67%	377	30.60%	169	13.72%	140	11.36%	8	0.65%	161	13.07%	1,232
Hood River	519	32.83%	396	25.05%	491	31.06%	121	7.65%	54	3.42%	28	1.77%	1,581
Jackson	2,079	39.65%	847	16.15%	1,620	30.90%	548	10.45%	149	2.84%	459	8.75%	5,243
Josephine	702	31.48%	305	13.68%	794	35.61%	397	17.80%	32	1.43%	-92	-4.13%	2,230
Klamath	815	41.95%	433	22.29%	502	25.84%	163	8.39%	30	1.54%	313	16.11%	1,943
Lake	357	33.65%	297	27.99%	286	26.96%	108	10.18%	13	1.23%	60	5.66%	1,061
Lane	2,596	34.55%	1,986	26.43%	1,815	24.16%	773	10.29%	343	4.57%	610	8.12%	7,513
Lincoln	375	28.43%	410	31.08%	265	20.09%	227	17.21%	42	3.18%	-35	-2.65%	1,319
Linn	2,134	39.69%	1,301	24.20%	1,229	22.86%	412	7.66%	300	5.58%	833	15.49%	5,376
Malheur	656	34.18%	648	33.77%	418	21.78%	165	8.60%	32	1.67%	8	0.42%	1,919
Marion	2,588	32.01%	2,523	31.21%	1,919	23.74%	580	7.17%	475	5.88%	65	0.80%	8,085
Morrow	275	26.19%	447	42.57%	187	17.81%	121	11.52%	20	1.90%	-172	-16.38%	1,050
Multnomah	13,894	34.76%	9,212	23.05%	12,523	31.33%	3,578	8.95%	761	1.90%	1,371	3.43%	39,968
Polk	1,201	36.93%	1,043	32.07%	637	19.59%	207	6.37%	164	5.04%	158	4.86%	3,252
Sherman	232	33.14%	244	34.86%	166	23.71%	21	3.00%	37	5.29%	-12	-1.71%	700
Tillamook	411	27.81%	496	33.56%	369	24.97%	157	10.62%	45	3.04%	-85	-5.75%	1,478
Umatilla	1,563	36.32%	1,261	29.30%	1,044	24.26%	304	7.06%	132	3.07%	302	7.02%	4,304
Union	1,090	34.78%	671	21.41%	946	30.19%	334	10.66%	93	2.97%	144	4.59%	3,134
Wallowa	610	33.30%	353	19.27%	600	32.75%	214	11.68%	55	3.00%	10	0.55%	1,832
Wasco	929	35.81%	775	29.88%	587	22.63%	212	8.17%	91	3.51%	154	5.94%	2,594
Washington	1,429	30.67%	1,261	27.07%	1,455	31.23%	290	6.22%	224	4.81%	-26	-0.56%	4,659
Wheeler	222	32.36%	307	44.75%	129	18.80%	14	2.04%	14	2.04%	-85	-12.39%	686
Yamhill	1,378	32.84%	1,312	31.27%	885	21.09%	271	6.46%	350	8.34%	66	1.57%	4,196
Totals	47,064	34.34%	34,673	25.30%	37,600	27.44%	13,343	9.74%	4,360	3.18%	9,464	6.91%	137,040

== See also ==
- United States presidential elections in Oregon
