= Clara Parker (sternwheeler) =

American steamboat

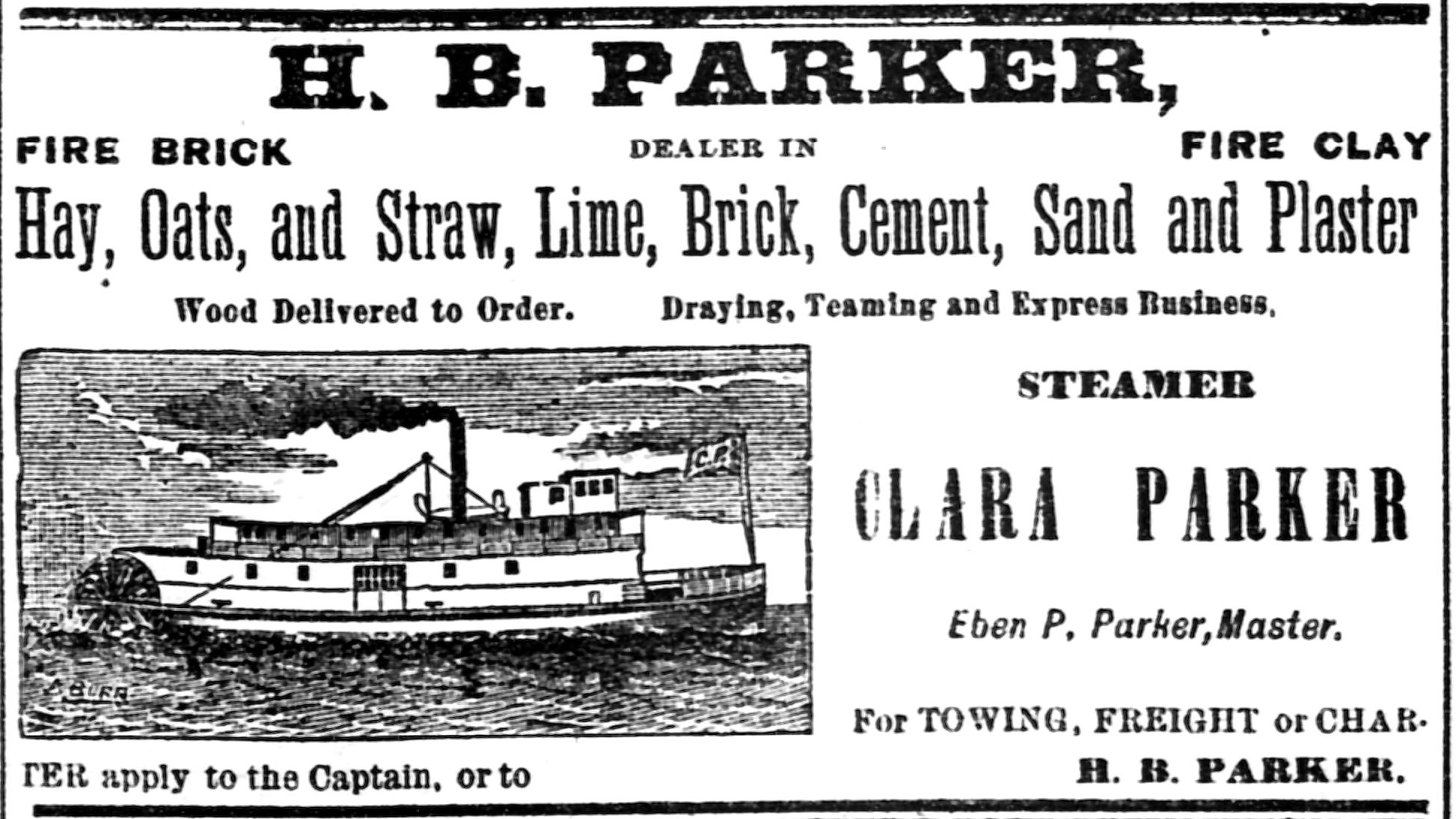
- Advertisement for Clara Parker, published in the Daily Morning Astorian, April 14, 1888.

History
- Name: Clara Parker, later, Astorian
- Owner: Hiram Bliss Parker; Jacob Kamm; others
- Route: Youngs River, lower Columbia and lower Willamette rivers
- Launched: May 14, 1881, at Astoria, Oregon
- Completed: June 2, 1881
- In service: 1881
- Out of service: 1903
- Identification: Clara Parker: US #125915; Astorian: US #106798
- Fate: Sank at mooring while out of service, April 1908; hull raised, machinery removed.
- Notes: Rebuilt in 1890 at Portland, Oregon, and renamed Astorian.

General characteristics
- Type: riverine passenger/freight
- Length: Clara Parker: 107.2 ft (32.67 m) exclusive of fantail; Astorian: 142 ft (43.28 m)
- Beam: Clara Parker: 24.5 ft (7.47 m); Astorian: 26.5 ft (8.08 m)
- Depth: 5.8 ft (1.77 m) depth of hold
- Installed power: twin steam engines, horizontally mounted: As Clara Parker: cylinder bore 12.5 in (32 cm); stroke 4 ft 6 in (137 cm); As Astorian: bore 14.5 in (37 cm); stroke 3.5 ft 6 in (122 cm)
- Propulsion: stern-wheel

Clara Parker was a sternwheel-driven steamboat which was operated on the lower Columbia and lower Willamette rivers in the 1880s. The steamer ran for about ten years out of Astoria, Oregon in towing and jobbing work. In 1890 Clara Parker was rebuilt and renamed Astorian.

Astorian was operated intermittently from 1891 to 1903, when it was tied up to a levee in Portland, Oregon, where in April 1908 it sank. Astoria spent much of its time out of service drawing a "subsidy" from competitors who wanted to keep their fares and freight rates high by keeping out a potential competing steamer.

== Construction ==
Clara Parker was built in 1881 at Astoria, Oregon for local businessman and politician Hiram Bliss Parker. Parker was a well-known Astoria merchant and political figure who dealt in "hay, oats, and straw, lime, brick, cement, sand and plaster." Parker advertised wood delivered to order, and a draying, teaming, and express business.

== Dimensions ==
Clara Parker's hull was 107.2 ft (32.67 m) exclusive of the overhang of the main deck over the stern, called the "fantail" on which the stern-wheel was mounted. The steamer had a beam of 24.5 ft (7.47 m) exclusive of the wide protective timbers, called guards running along the upper outside of the hull. The boat had a depth of hold of 5.8 ft (1.77 m). The overall size of the boat was 257.68 gross tons and 194.91 registered tons. Tonnage for these purposes was a measure of volume and not weight. The official merchant vessel registry number was 125915.

== Launch ==
Clara Parker was launched at the high tide on May 14, 1881, in Astoria. The boat was named after the youngest daughter of H.B. Parker. On June 1, 1881, Clara Parker was reported to have steam up in the boiler in preparation for departure upriver to Portland, Oregon for inspection. The trip did not take place until Saturday, June 4, when Clara Parker departed Astoria at 3:00 a.m., with Capt. C. Brock as master, John Ferrell as engineer, Eben P. Parker as first officer, and Eben's father, H.B. Parker as purser.

== Early career ==
On Sunday, August 7, 1881, Clara Parker, carrying an excursion party, navigated Youngs River to about two miles from the Youngs River Falls. There were many snags in the river, one of which was struck by the boat's wheel, but caused the boat no damage. In June 1883, Clara Parker made runs from Astoria to any and all points on the Columbia river. In 1885 H.B. Parker advertised the steamer Clara Parker for towing, freight, or charter. Clara Parker was in operation in April 1890, running from Portland to Astoria.

== Casualties ==
At 1:00 a.m. on June 12, 1883, Hazen Alex Parker, age 44, fireman of the Clara Parker, drowned when he lost his footing while boarding the vessel and fell into the river between the dock and the boat. The body was not immediately recovered. H.B. Parker offered $25 for recovery of the body.

On the afternoon of Friday, June 6, 1890, as Clara Parker was coming down Youngs River with a heavy deck load, Charles Hamlin a deck hand aged about 23, fell overboard and drowned. Hamlin had been walking around the deckload on the outside rail of the boat, when he lost his balance and fell into the river. The steamer was stopped, but Hamlin went under before a boat could be launched and was not seen again. Attempts on the day of the drowning to recover Hamlin's body by grappling were unsuccessful.

On July 4, 1892, at 3:00 a.m. when Astorian was lying at Parker's dock in Astoria, deckhand Henry Leinenweber fell overboard from the steamer. Leinenweber was reported to have been intoxicated.

== Reconstruction as Astorian ==
On June 29, 1890 Clara Parker was condemned by the Steamboat Inspection Service on the grounds that its hull was weak and defective. Clara Parker was rebuilt at Portland, Oregon and renamed Astorian. Astorian was scheduled to make its trial trip on December 29, 1890.

The engines of Astorian had a cylinder bore of 14.5 in (37 cm); and a piston stroke 3.5 ft 6 in (122 cm). They developed 1300 nominal horsepower.

Astorian was 142 ft (43.28 m) long on the main deck, exclusive of the fantail. The beam was 26.5 ft (8.08 m), and the depth of hold was 7.5 ft (2.29 m). Astorian's overall size was 361 gross and 234 registered tons. The official merchant vessel registry number was 106798.

== Operations as Astorian ==
Eben P. Parker, captain, Al Church, pilot, and John Phillips, engineer, operated Astorian in the early 1890s. According to one report, Astorian was reputed to be one of the faster boats on the river, and also to have been involved in frequent rate wars. Another source states that Astorian was "too slow to be much of a success anywhere."

=== Harvest Queen rescue ===
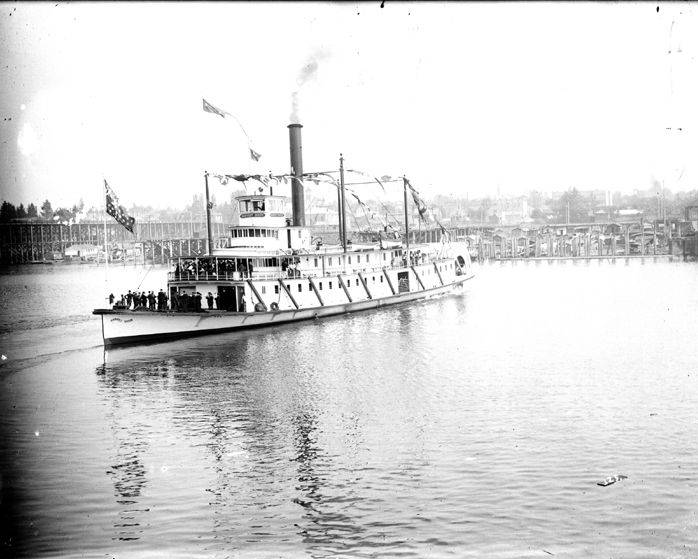
Harvest Queen, circa 1910. Astorian rescued its passengers after it grounded on January 23, 1892.

On January 23, 1892, Astorian took off 35 passengers from the sternwheeler Harvest Queen, which had grounded at Warrior Rock, near St. Helens, Oregon. Astorian carried the passengers to Portland. Harvest Queen was refloated with only minor damage.

=== Grounding in 1892 ===
On February 2, 1892, Astorian itself ran aground on the Columbia River near Three Tree Point. The steamer had been en route from Portland to Astoria when at 3:00 a.m. the rudder was struck by a floating timber. The boat then ran on a rock which made a large hole in the right side of the hull. Captain Parker was then in command. He went into the hold, stuffed sixteen pairs of blankets into the hole, set up timbers to hold them in the hole, and steamed on to Astoria, where the vessel arrived safely.

=== Opposition steamer ===
In February 1892 Astorian was being run on the route from Portland to Astoria in competition with the steamers of the Union Pacific Railroad, which included the large sternwheeler R.R. Thompson. Supported by Astoria businessmen, Astorian was running in connection with the steamers Dalles City and Regulator as an opposition line.

=== Collision with Ione ===
On February 16, 1892, Astorian collided with the stern-wheel steamer Ione in Portland, Oregon in a fog. Astorian sustained $50 damage. The case was investigated and as a result the license of Kane Olney, master and pilot of Astorian, was suspended for 10 days for violation of Section 8 of Rule V of the General Rules and Regulations, that is, failure to have a crewman, in addition to the regular pilot on watch, also standing watch in or near the pilot house.

=== Collision with R.R. Thompson ===
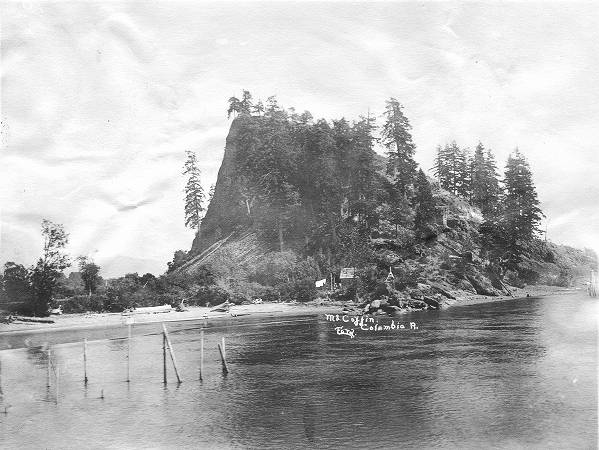
Mount Coffin, scene of the February 2, 1892, collision between Astorian and R.R. Thompson.

On the night of Wednesday, February 10, 1892, R.R. Thompson collided with Astorian at Coffin Point, on the Columbia River. The collision tore out the left deck and knocking in the guard. No leak in the hull was caused, and both vessels were able to proceed. The competition was said to have engendered bitter feelings between the two companies.

The officers of Astorian were reported to have claimed that the collision was not an accident, but rather an attempt to sink their boat, and rid the Union Pacific of a dangerous rival. A similar accusation was made by The Dalles Daily Chronicle.

=== Rate war ===
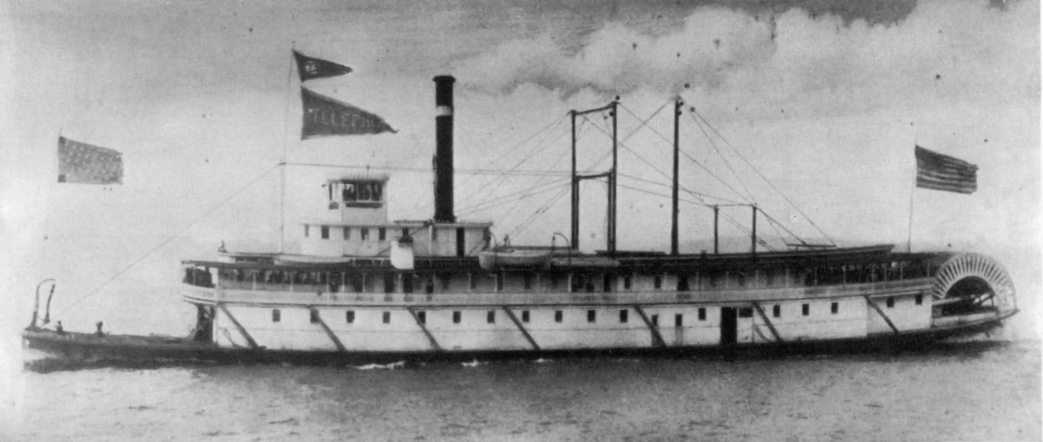
The fast steamer Telephone, Astorian's ally in the rate war with the Union Pacific Railroad.

By March 11, 1892, the Union Pacific was conducting a rate war on the Columbia with its rivals, the Astorian and the fast sternwheeler Telephone, By March 26, 1892, Union Pacific had reduced its fare to $1, and this had been met by Astoria and Telephone.

In June 1892 it was reported that the prominent businessman Jacob Kamm and the Northern Pacific Railway Company intended to "make things lively for the 'system'" on the lower Columbia river. Kamm, with all the business that the Northern Pacific could afford, had reached an agreement with H.B. Bliss to have Astorian carry passengers at a fare of $2 for the roundtrip Portland-Astoria, and freight at a rate of $1 per ton.

=== Paid off and removed from service ===
In August 1894 Astorian was tied up in Youngs Bay, west of Astoria, and been so for some time, since the last rate war, when fares had been driven down to 50 cents. H.B. Parker had been paid off by the competition to take Astorian out of service.

=== Railway construction work ===
Astorian is reported to have been chartered to the OR&N sometime before 1895, with OR&N placing the steamer on the Portland to Cascades route. On April 8, 1895 Astorian was used to inspect the proposed right of way for the Astoria and Columbia River railway, to be built from Astoria to Goble, Oregon. Astorian had been brought around from Young's Bay for the task, where it appears the boat had been laid up.

== Return to general service ==
Around August 1, 1894, H.B. Parker announced that Astorian had been repaired and newly painted, and would soon return to service on the Portland-Astoria route. Fares on that route $2 per round trip, at least as charged by the sternwheeler Sarah Dixon, which was just then being placed on the route. The rumor was that Parker's competitors had grown tired of paying him the subsidy to keep Astorian out of service, and had decided to take their chances in direct competition with Parker's boat.

On September 26, 1895, H.B. Parker "surprised the public" by announcing that Astorian would go on the Portland route on the first of October. Painters, carpenters, and machinists were at work on the boat, and the U.S. steamboat inspectors were scheduled to examine the vessel on September 28, 1895. Astorian was still being operated in late December 1896, when at Smith's point it picked up a small boat which had apparently been lost by the tender of the Young's Bay bridge.

On Saturday, June 26, 1897, steamboat inspectors Edwards and McDermott examined the boilers of Astorian, finding them in good condition. It was not clear whether the steamer was in operation at the time of the inspection.

== Second removal from service ==
Some time around December 1896, Astorian was laid up at Smith Point, downriver from Astoria, under an agreement between the companies operating steamers between Portland and Astoria. All the formerly competing companies had entered into a combine, and the owners of Astorian were paid $250 a month to keep their boat out of service.

In December 1898 the agreement to keep Astorian out of service expired. In August 1899 it was reported that Astorian, then still owned by Captain Parker, had been undergoing extensive repair work while the vessel was moored in Youngs River, and the boat was ready for service. It was reported at the time that railroads had made steamboating unprofitable on the lower Columbia. There was talk that Astorian would be put again on the Astoria route as an opposition boat.

== Failed subsidy seeker ==
Astorian had not been operated much, spending most its time lying idle on a subsidy, which probably made as much money for the steamer as other boats did by running. On June 24, 1901, Astorian arrived in Portland from downriver, where the boat loaded railroad iron to be used on a logging rail line on the Lewis and Clark River.

In July 1901 Astorian, reportedly nearly ready to begin running, was described by the Morning Oregonian as a boat "whose mission in life seems to be that of a subsidy seeker."

Astorian received no subsidy, nor were the steamer's owners willing to put it on as an opposition boat. Instead Astorian was tied up, again, in Young's Bay. According to a report of the time, the movement to put Astorian in service had reached the point where pledges were being secured to guarantee a certain amount of freight, when a representative of the steamer lines already running on the river informed Astorian's promoters that if they put Astorian on, the competing lines would immediately reduce fares to 10 cents and freight carriage to 25 cents a ton.

== Later years ==
On April 14, 1902 Astorian was being refitted and in a few days would be ready to run between Astoria and Portland, which would, it was thought, reduce the current freight and passenger rates.

By January 1903, Astorian had been sold to or otherwise come under the control of the White Collar steamboat line. In January 1903, the White Collar line planned to equip Astorian with a new boiler and heavy machinery to increase the steamer's speed and competitiveness. The White Collar Line ran the boat in opposition to the Oregon Railway and Navigation Company's steamers.

== Disposition ==
For the five years leading up to April 1908, Astorian lay at the Portland city levee, at the foot of Jefferson Street. On Friday, April 3, 1908, the boilers were being removed. Early on the next Saturday morning, the boat sprang a leak, the hull quickly filled with water, and the vessel quickly same to the bottom. The machinery to be removed had been left temporarily on the bow of the boat;its added weight on the bow contributed to the sinking. At the time of the sinking Astorian was owned by Jacob Kamm, who had bought the steamer from the White Collar line just before taking the vessel out of active service in 1903.

In October 1908 the hull of Astorian (which by then had apparently been raised), was assessed for tax purposes to the prominent steamboatman Uriah Bonser Scott at a value of US$15,000. J. Allen Harrison, assistant superintendent of the Vancouver Transportation Company acknowledged ownership, but complained to Multnomah County Board of Equalization that the machinery had been removed from the steamer and that the hull was rotten and of no value, and should be removed from the assessment rolls.
