= Little Clatskanie River =

- Location of the mouth of the Little Clatskanie River in Oregon
- Etymology: An Indian word, Tlats-kani, referring to a point in the Nehalem Valley but applied by whites to two rivers in the area, the Clatskanie and the Klaskanine

Location
- Country: United States
- State: Oregon
- County: Columbia County

Physical characteristics
- Source: Northern Oregon Coast Range
  - location: Sarafin Point, Columbia County, Oregon
  - coordinates: 45°54′35″N 122°59′40″W
  - elevation: 1,245 ft (379 m)
- Mouth: Clatskanie River
  - location: near Apiary, Columbia County, Oregon
  - coordinates: 45°59′19″N 123°02′20″W
  - elevation: 620 ft (190 m)

The Little Clatskanie River is a short tributary of the Clatskanie River in Columbia County in the U.S. state of Oregon. It begins near Sarafin Point in the Northern Oregon Coast Range northwest of St. Helens and flows generally north to meet the larger stream near the unincorporated community of Apiary. The mouth of the Little Clatskanie is about 16 miles (26 km) from the main stem Clatskanie's confluence with the Columbia River. The Little Clatskanie has no named tributaries.

According to Fishing in Oregon, the entire Clatskanie system supports a population of resident cutthroat trout.

== See also ==
- List of rivers of Oregon
