= Clatskanie River =

- Location of the mouth of Clatskanie River in Oregon
- Etymology: An Indian word, Tlats-kani, referring to a point in the Nehalem Valley but applied by whites to two rivers in the area, the Clatskanie and the Klaskanine

Location
- Country: United States
- State: Oregon
- County: Columbia County

Physical characteristics
- Source: Northern Oregon Coast Range
  - location: Columbia County, Oregon
  - coordinates: 45°51′47″N 122°59′59″W
  - elevation: 1,340 ft (410 m)
- Mouth: Columbia River
  - location: Clatskanie, Columbia County, Oregon
  - coordinates: 46°07′10″N 123°13′15″W
  - elevation: 16 ft (4.9 m)

The Clatskanie River is a tributary of the Columbia River, approximately 25 miles (40 km) long, in northwestern Oregon in the United States. It drains a timber-producing area in the foothills of the Northern Oregon Coast Range north-northwest of Portland.

It rises in eastern Columbia County, approximately 10 miles (16 km) west of St. Helens on the northern slopes of Bunker Hill. Major tributaries include Carcus Creek and the North Fork of the Clatskanie, which converge at Swedetown. The North Fork rises at Apiary. It flows generally north-northwest through the Clatsop State Forest, past Clatskanie. The Clatskanie River converges with Conyers Creek and Beaver Creek near Clatskanie and then it enters a slough on the Columbia from the south approximately 5 miles (8 km) east of Westport.

The river is named for the Tlatskanai, an Athabascan tribe of Native Americans who lived in the valley of the nearby Nehalem River at the time of the arrival of Europeans in the early 19th century. There is also a Klaskanine River in Clatsop County which was really named for the same reason. The names as used by the natives did not apply to the respective rivers, but applied to the path, route or trail by which one could get to the customary tribal area of the Tlatskanai.

== Tributaries ==
Named tributaries of the Clatskanie River from source to mouth begin with the Little Clatskanie River, which enters from the right. Then comes Buck Creek, right; Falls Creek, left; North Fork, right; and Carcus, Page, Miller, and Vonberg creeks, all from the left. Then Langfeld and Keystone creeks, from the right; Perkins, Merril, Conyers, and Fall creeks, all from the left, and Beaver Slough (Beaver Creek), right.

== See also ==
- List of rivers of Oregon
