= Socialist Party of Oregon (Columbia County, Oregon) =

The Socialist Party of Oregon in Columbia County, Oregon began around the First Red Scare. The first year (1914) it went mainstream, the Socialist party had 27 more registered members than the Prohibition Party, who were some members of the Suffrage movement. The Socialist party was similar to the Progressive Party in the county, as it tried from the outskirts of government to make change. While Socialism failed its first year, it still received attention from the press who was aware of the October Revolution (1918) in Russia (Now the Soviet Union) by a similarly named government led by Vladimir Lenin.

== 1916 election ==
During the 1916 election, it was considered a failure by the Socialist Party of Columbia County as they only saw eight votes trickle in from Clatskanie, Oregon. Mist, Oregon had two socialist voters while Vernonia, Oregon had 18 residents who voted to socialist ticket and St. Helens, Oregon had 19 total socialist voters. Due to county rules in 1916, the Socialists failed to reach the county's minimum requirement for entering the ballot process. Despite this, the Socialist party was the fourth most registered party in all the county, with the Prohibitionists and the Progressives staggering behind.

== World War One members ==
Clarence Burke, a member of the Socialist Party living in Columbia County, Oregon was described as a draft dodger for the First World War. Burke was arrested by the Columbia County Sheriff's Office, but had the chance to prove that he was nonessential personnel.
