= Vernonia School District 47J v. Acton =

- Supreme Court of the United States

Argued March 28, 1995 Decided June 21, 1995
- Full case name: Vernonia School District 47J v. Acton et ux., Guardians ad Litem for Acton
- Citations: 515 U.S. 646 (more) 115 S. Ct. 2386
- Argument: Oral argument

Case history
- Prior: Verdict for defendant in the United States District Court for the District of Oregon, 796 F. Supp. 1354 (D. Or. 1992); reversed by United States Court of Appeals for the Ninth Circuit, 23 F.3d 1514 (9th Cir. 1994); cert. granted, 513 U.S. 1013 (1994).

Holding
- The Fourth Amendment allows random drug testing of high school students involved in athletic programs.

Court membership
- Chief Justice William Rehnquist Associate Justices John P. Stevens · Sandra Day O'Connor; Antonin Scalia · Anthony Kennedy; David Souter · Clarence Thomas; Ruth Bader Ginsburg · Stephen Breyer

Case opinions
- Majority: Scalia, joined by Rehnquist, Kennedy, Thomas, Ginsburg, Breyer
- Concurrence: Ginsburg
- Dissent: O'Connor, joined by Stevens, Souter

Laws applied
- U.S. Const. amends. IV, XIV

Vernonia School District 47J v. Acton, 515 U.S. 646 (1995), was a U.S. Supreme Court decision which upheld the constitutionality of random drug testing regimen implemented by the local public schools in Vernonia, Oregon. Under that regimen, student-athletes were required to submit to random drug testing before being allowed to participate in sports. During the season, 10% of all athletes were selected at random for testing. The Supreme Court held that although the tests were searches under the Fourth Amendment, they were reasonable in light of the schools' interest in preventing teenage drug use.

== Facts ==
In the mid-1980s, officials in the school district in Vernonia noticed a precipitous rise in drug use among the students in the Vernonia School District. Disciplinary problems arose in frequency and severity, including among student athletes. At the trial, the Vernonia High School football and wrestling coaches noted they had witnessed injuries attributable to student drug use.

In response, the school district offered special classes, speakers, and presentations to the students intended to deter drug use. It brought in a specially trained dog to detect drugs, but the drug problem continued unabated. After inviting comments from the parents of the district's students, the district adopted a drug testing plan.

The protocol of the random drug testing program the district initiated was straightforward. All student athletes would be required to submit to the program as a condition of participating in athletics. All athletes were tested at the beginning of the season, and 10% of the athletes were selected randomly every week to provide a urine sample. The samples were collected in a manner that preserved the students' modesty. If a student's sample tested positive, the student was given the option of either undergoing counseling and submitting to six weekly drug tests or sitting out the remainder of that season as well as the following season.

Students challenged the drug testing plan in court as a violation of Fourth Amendment rights, with the case eventually reaching the U.S. Supreme Court in 1995.

== Opinion of the court ==
According to the Supreme Court, the Fourth Amendment only protects against unreasonable searches and seizures. Although a search is presumptively reasonable if carried out under a warrant issued upon a showing of probable cause, the court has a long history of allowing leniency when "special needs" outside of ordinary law enforcement needs make obtaining a warrant impractical. Such "special needs" adhere in the public school context, because administrators need to be able to maintain order within the school. The final vote was 6-3 in favor of the school.

The Fourth Amendment only protects against intrusions upon legitimate expectations of privacy. Central to the Court's analysis, in this case, was that the "subjects of the policy are (1) children, who (2) have been committed to the temporary custody of the State as a schoolmaster." The schools act in loco parentis to the children, and have "such a portion of the power of the parent committed to his charge... as may be necessary to answer the purposes for which he was employed." Therefore, in the public school context, the reasonableness inquiry "cannot disregard the schools' custodial and tutelary responsibility for children." Public schools require students to undergo vaccinations, vision, hearing, dermatological screenings, and other examinations. Thus, public school students have a lesser expectation of privacy than members of the general public.

Among public school students, athletes have even less of an expectation of privacy. They suit up in locker rooms before practice. They take communal showers afterward. They subject themselves to additional regulations and medical screenings to participate in school sports. "Somewhat like adults who choose to participate in a 'closely regulated industry,' students who voluntarily participate in school athletics have reason to expect intrusions upon normal rights and privileges, including privacy."

Urinalysis may intrude upon a person's privacy in two ways. First, the subject is monitored while providing the actual sample. In the case of the Vernonia policy, boys were visually monitored from behind while providing the sample, while girls were monitored aurally from outside a closed stall. The Court considered this a "negligible" intrusion on the subject's privacy interest. Second, the test discloses personal information concerning "the state of the subject's body and the materials he has ingested." But the school was testing only for the use of drugs, not whether the student was diabetic or pregnant. The results of the test were disclosed only to a small group of school officials and not to law enforcement. And although the Vernonia policy required students to disclose prescription drugs the student was taking in advance, the Court was unwilling to assume that the school district would misuse the medical information disclosed to it by student-athletes. The Court thus concluded that the invasion of privacy was "not significant."

By contrast, the schools' interest in deterring drug use among students was truly important. Drug use has a more deleterious effect on adolescents than on adults. The "effects of a drug-infested school are visited not just upon the users, but upon the entire student body and faculty, as the educational process is disrupted." Drug use by student-athletes, moreover, increases the risk of injury during sporting events themselves. The Vernonia student-athletes were the leaders of the drug culture at the school; it was "self-evident" to the Court that "a drug problem largely fueled by the 'role model' effect of athletes' drug use, and particular danger to athletes, is effectively addressed by making sure that athletes do not use drugs." The students argued that a less intrusive policy would require some individualized suspicion before testing a student for drugs, but the Court observed that the Fourth Amendment's reasonableness requirement did not demand the use of the least intrusive means to achieve the government's aims. Thus, the Vernonia policy was a reasonable search under the Fourth Amendment.

=== Dissenting opinion ===
Justice Sandra Day O'Connor dissented because the Court's decision did not rest on the requirement of individualized suspicion and did not adequately explain why individualized suspicion was not required in this context. Historically, the Court had disapproved of blanket searches, particularly in the criminal context, where the search was more than minimally intrusive. More recently, the Court had limited its willingness to dispense with the individualized suspicion requirement only in particularly dangerous contexts, such as prisons. Furthermore, the school district itself already had in place a discipline system based on individualized suspicion for a variety of infractions, such that adding drug testing to the mix would not be particularly onerous. All the evidence justifying the drug testing program "consisted of first- or second-hand stories of particular, identifiable students acting in ways that gave rise to reasonable suspicion of in-school drug use." If the school district had acted against these particular students, it could have avoided intruding on Acton's Fourth Amendment rights at all.

== Later developments ==
The court considered a similar question in Independent School District No. 92 v. Earls, 536 U.S. 822. The court upheld the practice of a school district requiring students who chose to do extracurricular activities to submit to drug testing.
