= Delena (disambiguation) =

Delena is a genus of spiders.

Delena or DeLena may also refer to:

- Delena, Oregon, United States
- Delena cancerides, a huntsman spider
- DeLena Johnson (born 1963), American politician
- Delena Kidd (born 1935), English actress

== See also ==
- De Lena, a white Spanish wine grape variety
- Deleni (disambiguation)
- Deena, a given name
- Helena (disambiguation)
- Selena (disambiguation)
