= Vernonia High School =

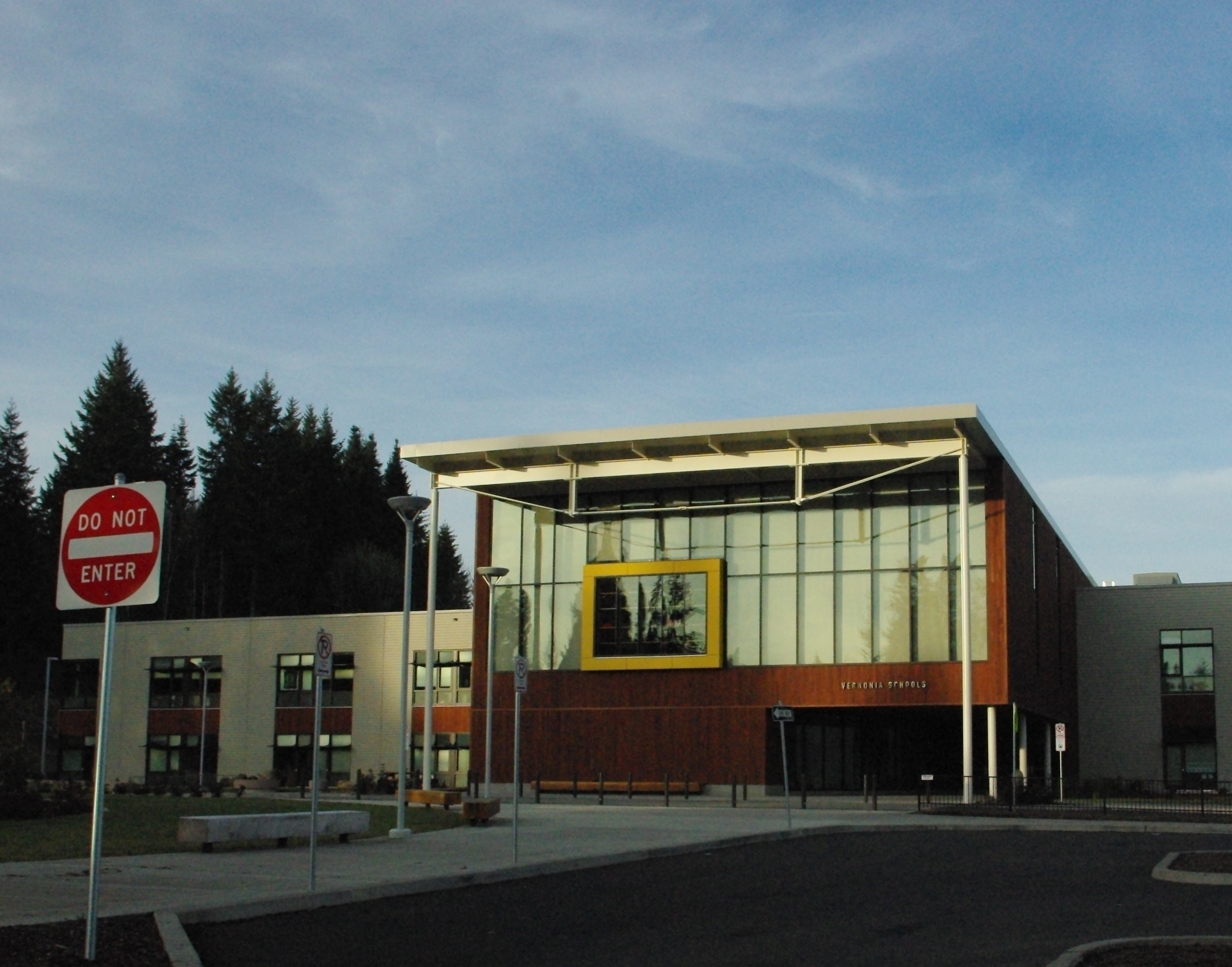
- Vernonia Schools building

Location
- 1000 Missouri Avenue; Vernonia, (Columbia County), Oregon 97064; United States; 45.860489°N 123.178517°W

Information
- Type: Public
- Opened: 1922
- School district: Vernonia School District
- Principal: Nate Underwood
- Grades: 9-12
- Enrollment: 176 (2023-2024)
- Colors: Royal blue and gold
- Athletics conference: OSAA Northwest League 2A-1
- Mascot: Loggers
- Website: www.vernonia.k12.or.us

Vernonia High School is a public high school located in Vernonia, Oregon, United States. In the wake of severe flooding in 2007, Vernonia City voters approved a $13 million bond in 2009 to build a new school complex in Vernonia. The new school, now a K-12 school, was completed during the summer of 2012 at a cost $40 million. The new building was built above the flood plain to prevent future flooding.

The original Vernonia High School opened on November 17, 1922. Previously, some high school education was available in Vernonia but no formal high school existed. The first graduating class was in 1923.

The 1922 high school building was replaced by a new facility which opened in 1952. This Vernonia High School remained in use until the new existing K-12 school was opened.

== Academics ==
In 2008, 90% of the school's seniors received a high school diploma. Of 52 students, 47 graduated, 2 dropped out, two received a modified diploma, and one was still in high school the following year.

== See also ==
- Vernonia School District 47J v. Acton, a 1995 U.S. Supreme Court decision relating to random searches for drugs imposed on students
