= Quincy, Oregon =

Unincorporated community in the state of Oregon, United States

Coordinates: 46.1437218°N 123.1601189°W

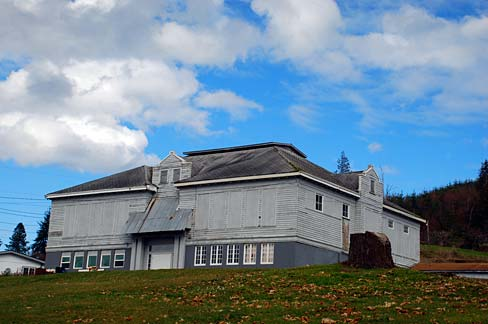
Old Quincy School, built in 1925

Quincy is an unincorporated community in Columbia County, Oregon, United States. It is located about 4.5 miles northeast of Clatskanie and 3.5 miles southwest of Mayger in a drained and diked area of the Columbia River lowlands.

The Quincy area was first settled around 1882 and was named by J. W. Barnes after his hometown of Quincy, Illinois. The Quincy post office ran from 1892 to 1933.

In 1915, Quincy had a population of 40 and two churches and two schools. In 1940, Quincy had a population of 303. Quincy Store is still in operation.
