= Vernonia School District =

School district in Oregon, USA

Location
- Vernonia, Oregon United States

District information
- Type: Public
- Grades: K-12

Other information
- Website: www.vernonia.k12.or.us

The Vernonia School District is a public school district that serves students in the communities of Vernonia and Mist in the U.S. state of Oregon. Vernonia Elementary School, Vernonia Middle School, and Vernonia High School are contained in separate wings of a single building in Vernonia constructed on high ground after floods in 1996 and 2007 severely impacted the city. The new building was built above the floodplain to prevent future flooding.

Most of the district is in Columbia County. A portion is in Washington County.

== Schools ==
- Mist Elementary School
  - As of 2015, Mist Elementary served 16 students in grades K-5, in a 1917 school building with one teacher
- Vernonia Elementary School
- Vernonia Middle School
- Vernonia High School

== See also ==
- Great Coastal Gale of 2007
- Vernonia School District 47J v. Acton
- Willamette Valley Flood of 1996
