= Lindbergh, Oregon =

Unincorporated community in the state of Oregon, United States

- Unincorporated community
- Location within Oregon Location within the United States
- Coordinates: 46.075°N 122.906°W
- Country: United States
- State: Oregon
- County: Columbia
- Elevation: 144 ft (44 m)
- Time zone: UTC-8 (Pacific (PST))
  - Summer (DST): UTC-7 (PDT)
- ZIP code: 97048
- Area codes: 503 and 971

Lindbergh is an unincorporated community in Columbia County, Oregon, United States. It is named in recognition of Charles Lindbergh, world’s greatest hero of the hour.
