= Apiary, Oregon =

Unincorporated community in the state of Oregon, United States

- Unincorporated community
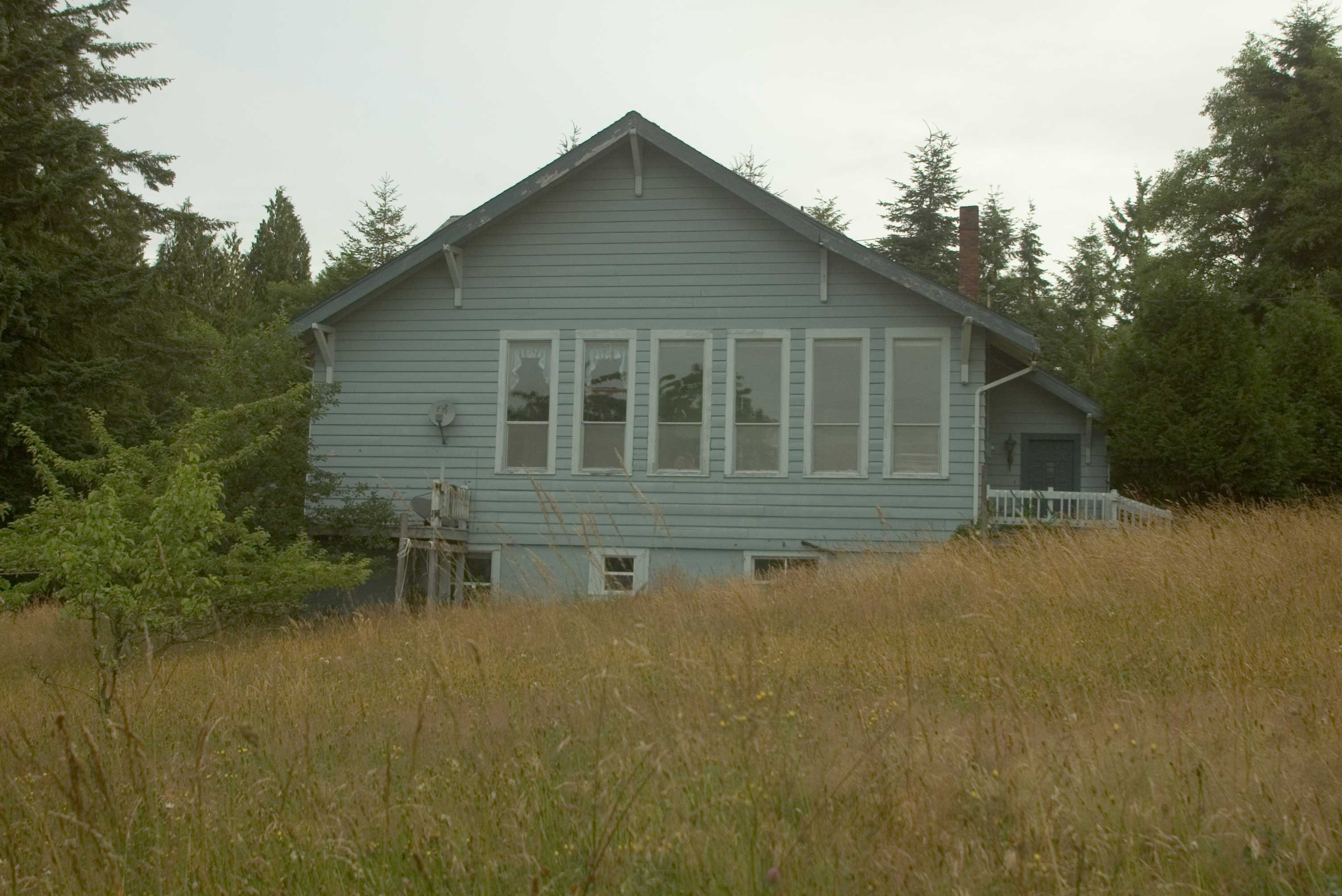
- Apiary School Building in 2007

- Location within the state of Oregon Apiary (the United States)
- Coordinates: 46°1′8″N 123°1′54″W
- Country: United States
- State: Oregon
- County: Columbia
- Time zone: UTC-8 (Pacific (PST))
  - Summer (DST): UTC-7 (PDT)
- ZIP codes: 97048
- Area codes: 458 and 541

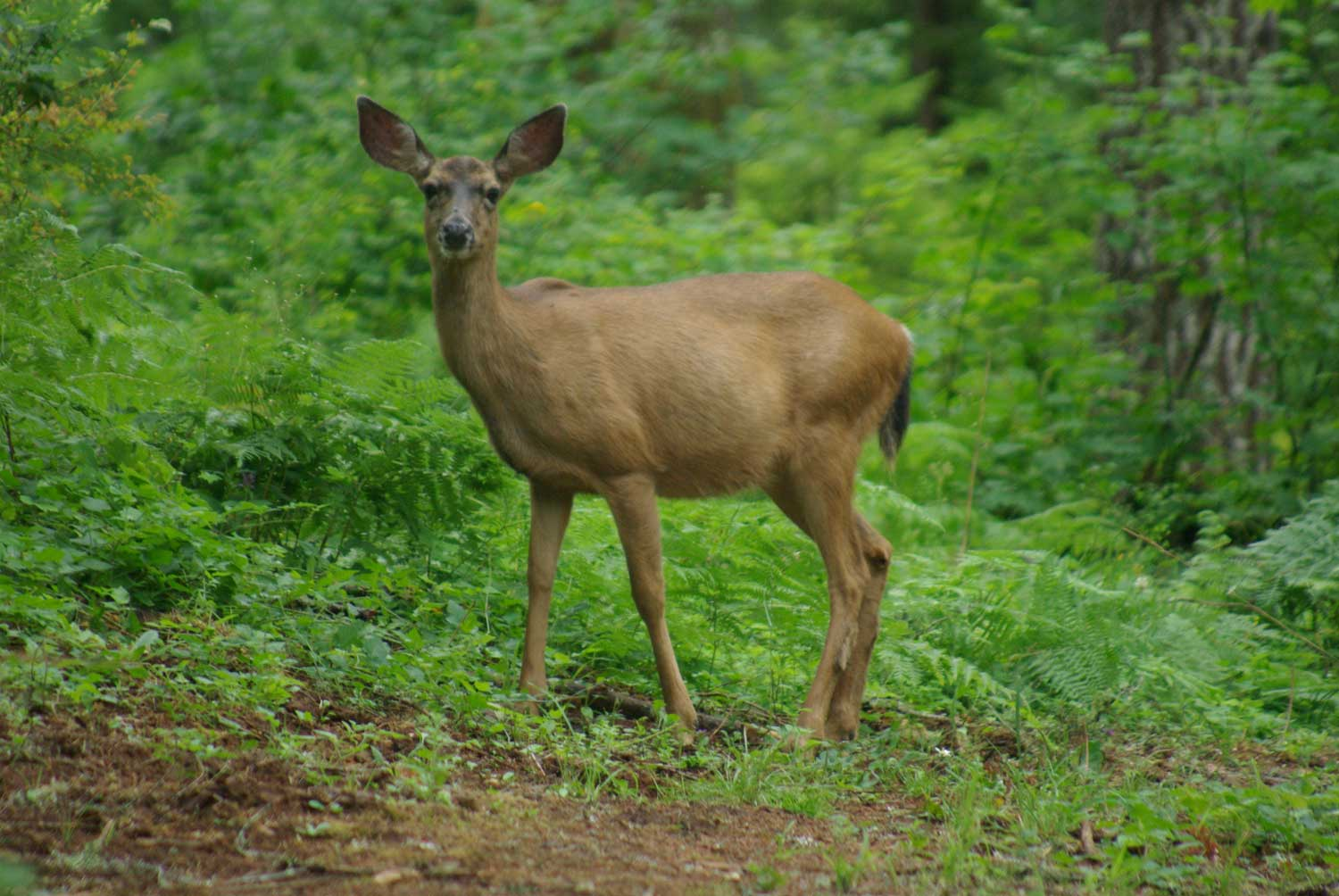
Black Tailed Deer near Apiary

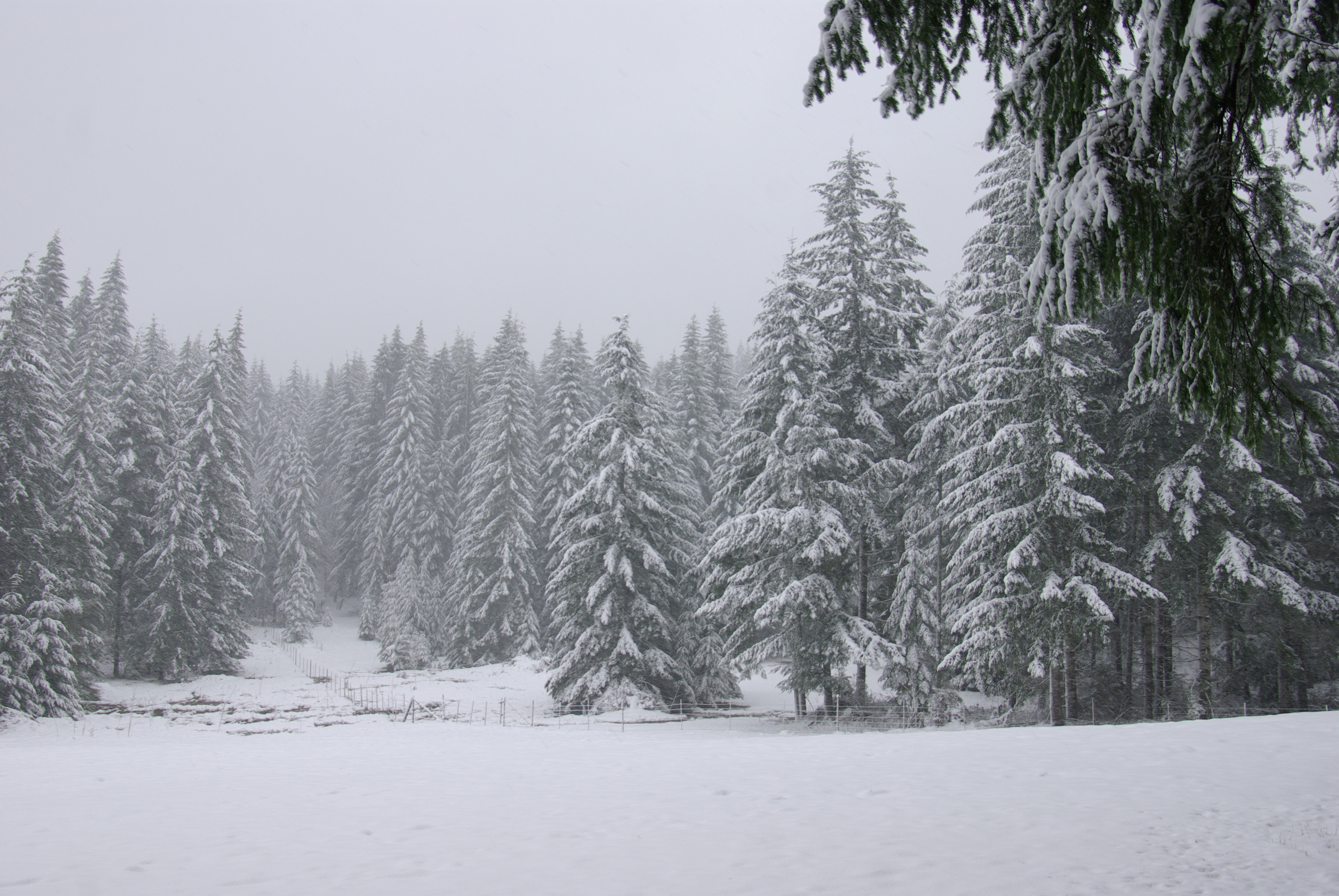
Coastal Douglas Fir Woodland near Apiary

Apiary is an unincorporated community in Columbia County, Oregon, United States, that takes its name from a post office established by David M. Dorsey. The post office operated from August 28, 1889, until March 24, 1924. It is reported that Dorsey was a beekeeper, which provided the source of the name for the Post Office and thus the community.

The community was served by Apiary School District #38, which operated a two-room school providing education services for grades 1 through 8. When operational, it operated in conjunction with the Rainier Union High School District which provided education services for grades 9 through 12. (The high school district also included a number of other grade school districts in the area: Delena, Hudson, Fern Hill, Rainier, Goble, Shiloh Basin, and Neer City districts. In the 1960s, the districts were consolidated into a single district, and the rural schools were closed over the next 10 to 15 years.) The community and the school are located along the road now known as Apiary Road near the headwaters of the North Fork of the Clatskanie River. At this writing, the school building still exists but has been converted to a private home. The community also includes a pioneer cemetery but has never contained a community center such as a church, Grange hall, or even a fire station.

Currently, Apiary Road is a popular freight route for forest products moving from the Northern Oregon Coast Range (particularly areas drained by the Nehalem River) to markets in Longview, Washington. The Apiary Road interconnects the Nehalem Highway north of Pittsburg signed as Oregon Route 47 with U.S. Route 30 west of Rainier. However, the intersection with U.S. Route 30 is signed as Larson Road, because Apiary Road technically ends at Old Rainier Road, a former route of U.S. Route 30 just to the south of the present U.S. Route 30.
