= Alston, Oregon =

Unincorporated community in the state of Oregon, United States

- Unincorporated community
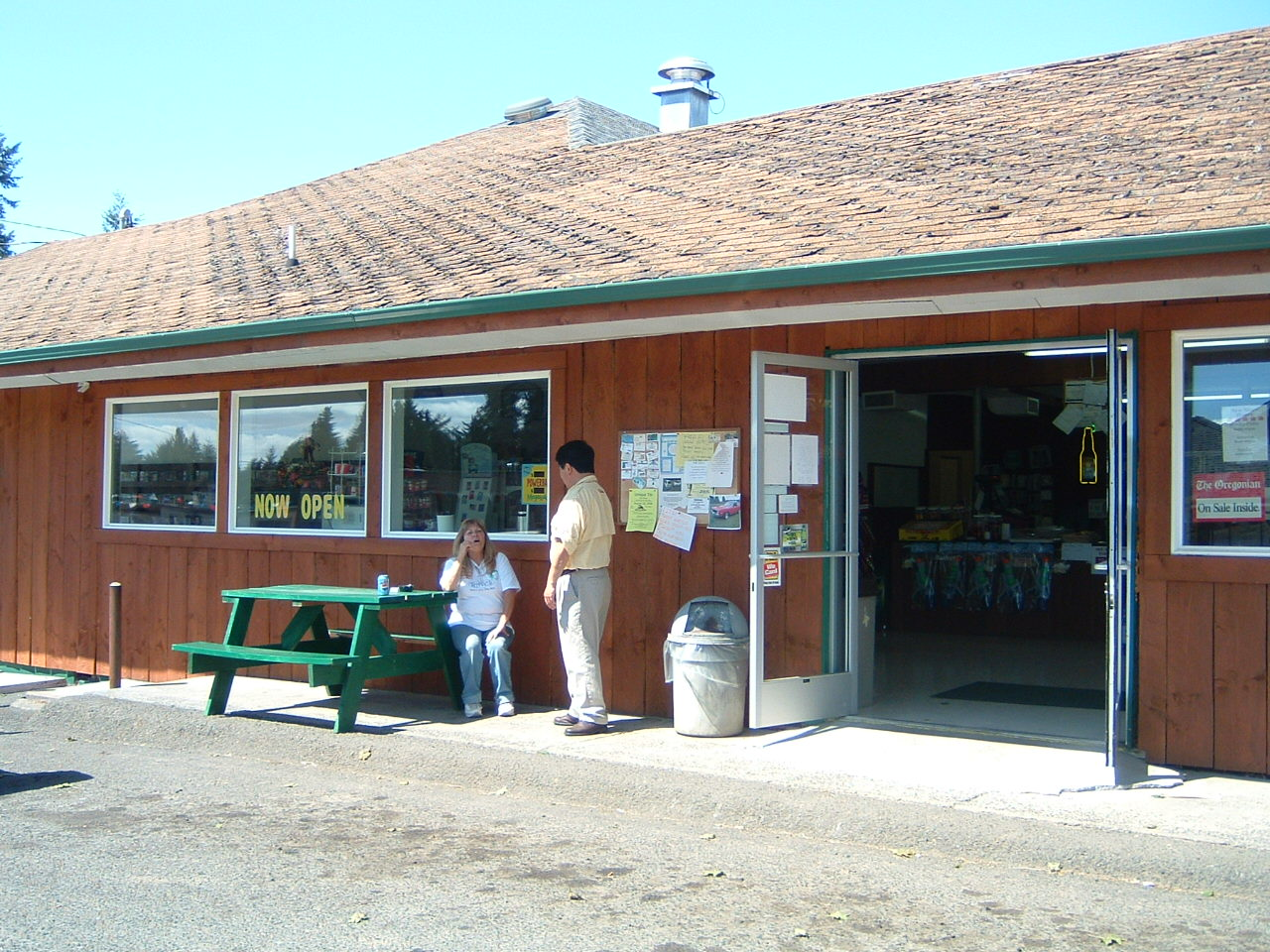
- Alston Country Store

- Location within the state of Oregon Alston (the United States)
- Coordinates: 46°05′57″N 123°02′49″W
- Country: United States
- State: Oregon
- County: Columbia
- Elevation: 499 ft (152 m)
- Time zone: UTC-8 (Pacific (PST))
  - Summer (DST): UTC-7 (PDT)
- Area codes: 458 and 541
- GNIS feature ID: 1135999
- Coordinates and elevation from Geographic Names Information System

Alston is an unincorporated community in Columbia County in the U.S. state of Oregon. It lies along U.S. Route 30 (Lower Columbia River Highway) between Rainier and Clatskanie. Old Rainier Road and Alston–Mayger Road intersect Route 30 at Alston.
