= Vernonia Municipal Airport =

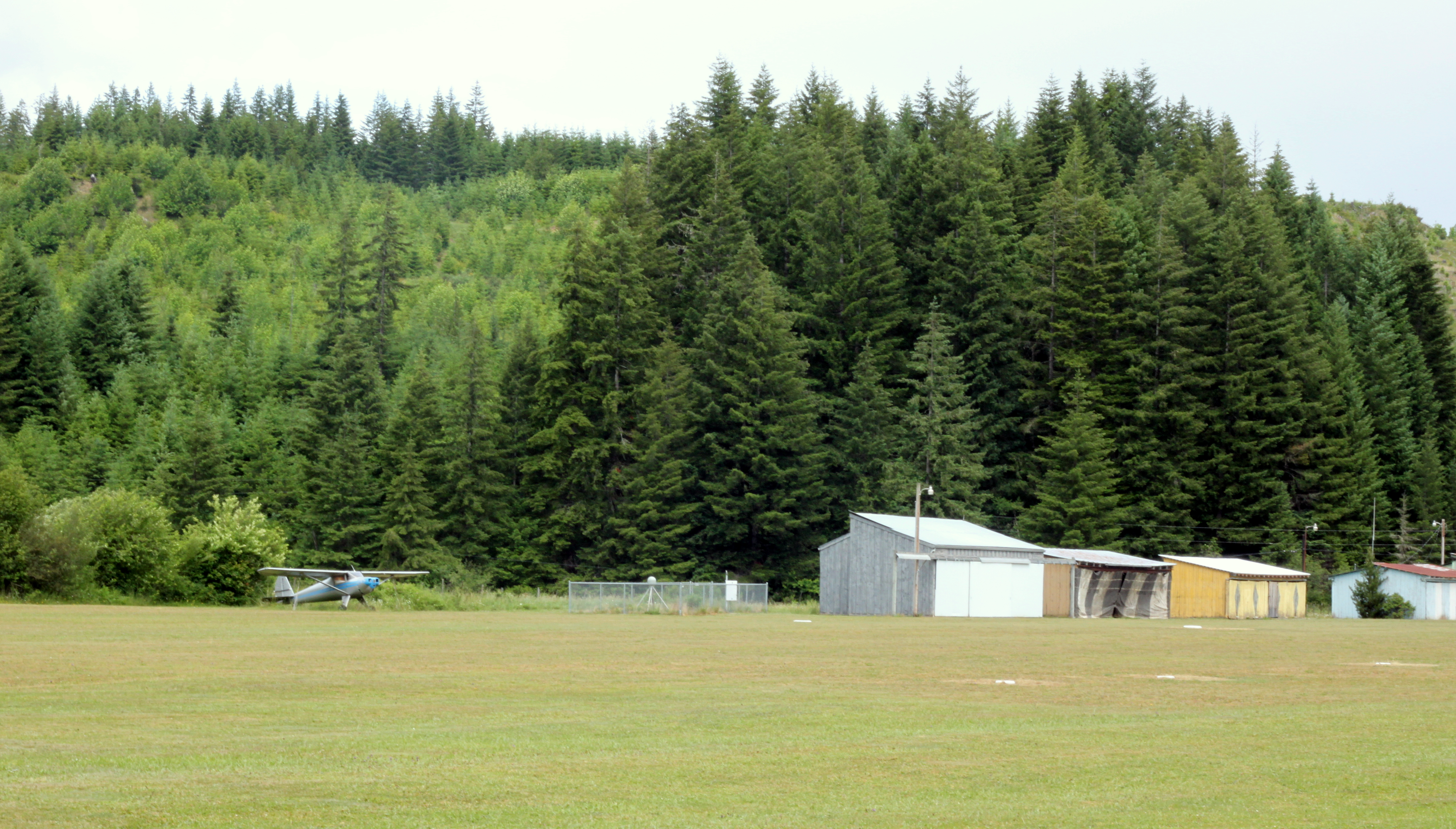
- Grass runway, planes, and hangars
- IATA: none; ICAO: none; FAA LID: 05S

Summary
- Airport type: Public
- Owner: City of Vernonia
- Serves: Vernonia, Oregon
- Elevation AMSL: 647 ft / 197 m
- Coordinates: 45°51′05″N 123°14′29″W
- Interactive map of Vernonia Municipal Airport

Runways
Direction	Length		Surface
Direction	ft	m	Surface
9/27	2,940	896	Turf

Statistics (2007)
- Aircraft operations: 3,000
- Based aircraft: 5
- Source: Federal Aviation Administration

Vernonia Municipal Airport (FAA LID: 05S) is a city-owned, public-use airport located two nautical miles (3.7 km) west of the central business district of Vernonia, Oregon.

== Facilities and aircraft ==
Vernonia Municipal Airport covers an area of 47 acres (19 ha) at an elevation of 647 feet (197 m) above mean sea level. It has one runway designated 9/27 with a turf surface measuring 2,940 by 45 feet (896 x 14 m).

For the 12-month period ending February 12, 2007, the airport had 3,000 general aviation aircraft operations, an average of 250 per month. At that time there were 5 aircraft based at this airport, all single-engine.
