= Keasey, Oregon =

- Former Unincorporated community
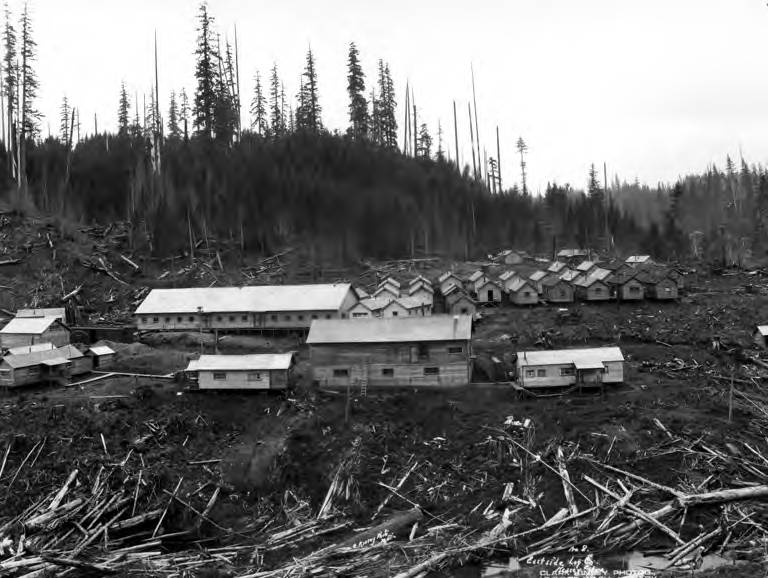
- Railroad camp, Eastside Logging Company, Keasey, ca 1925

- Location within Oregon Location within the United States
- Coordinates: 45.861°N 123.33°W
- Country: United States
- State: Oregon
- County: Columbia
- Elevation: 876 ft (267 m)
- Time zone: UTC-8 (Pacific (PST))
  - Summer (DST): UTC-7 (PDT)
- ZIP code: 97064
- Area codes: 503 and 971

Keasey is a former settlement in Columbia County, Oregon, United States. It was named after settler Eden W. Keasey, who was also first postmaster of the post office, which operated from August 5, 1890, to 1955. There are no remains of the original community due to the destruction of the Portland, Astoria & Pacific Railroad.
