= Kerry, Oregon =

Unincorporated community in the state of Oregon, United States

- Unincorporated community
- Location within Oregon Location within the United States
- Coordinates: 46.121°N 123.352°W
- Country: United States
- State: Oregon
- County: Columbia
- Elevation: 23 ft (7 m)
- Time zone: UTC-8 (Pacific (PST))
  - Summer (DST): UTC-7 (PDT)
- ZIP code: 97016
- Area codes: 503 and 971

Kerry is an unincorporated community in Columbia County, Oregon, United States, located about 30 miles east of Astoria. It was founded to extend the Columbia & Nehalem River Railroad and named in 1912 by lumberman Albert S. Kerry. In the 1920s it had about 200 inhabitants. Its post office opened in 1917 and closed in 1938.
