= Inglis, Oregon =

Unincorporated community in the state of Oregon, United States

- Unincorporated community
- Location within Oregon Location within the United States
- Coordinates: 46.126°N 123.125°W
- Country: United States
- State: Oregon
- County: Columbia
- Elevation: 16 ft (5 m)
- Time zone: UTC-8 (Pacific (PST))
  - Summer (DST): UTC-7 (PDT)
- ZIP code: 97016
- Area codes: 503 and 971

Inglis is an unincorporated community in Columbia County, Oregon, United States. Inglis post office was established on September 30, 1902, and was named after the first postmaster, John E. Inglis. The post office closed in 1910, then reopened in 1914, finally closing in 1918. The railroad station at this locale was named Inglis Station.
