= Klaskanine River =

- Location of the mouth of Klaskanine River in Oregon
- Etymology: An Indian word, Tlats-kani, referring to a point in the Nehalem Valley but applied by whites to two rivers in the area, the Klaskanine and the Clatskanie

Location
- Country: United States
- State: Oregon
- County: Clatsop County

Physical characteristics
- Source: Northern Oregon Coast Range
  - location: Clatsop County, Oregon
  - coordinates: 46°05′24″N 123°44′48″W
  - elevation: 30 ft (9.1 m)
- Mouth: Youngs River
  - location: near Astoria, Clatsop County, Oregon
  - coordinates: 46°05′33″N 123°46′33″W
  - elevation: 3 ft (0.91 m)

The Klaskanine River is a tributary of the Youngs River, approximately 16 miles (26 km) long, in northwest Oregon in the United States. It drains a small section of the Coast Range in the extreme northwest corner of the state in the watershed of the nearby Columbia River.

It rises in three short forks in the mountains in central Clatsop County, in the Clatsop State Forest north of Saddle Mountain State Natural Area. The Middle Fork joins the North Fork, which then joins the South Fork. The combined stream flows generally northwest and enters the Youngs River from the east approximately 5 miles (8 km) south of Astoria.

== See also ==
- List of Oregon rivers
