= Mount Coffin =

Mountain in Washington (state), United States

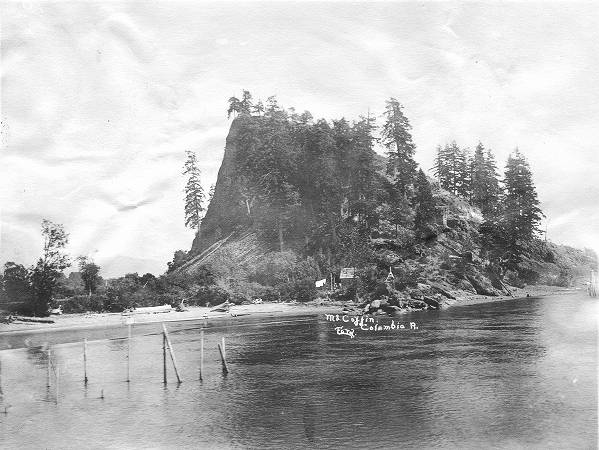
- Mount Coffin as it was in 1900

Highest point
- Coordinates: 46°07′43″N 122°59′16″W

Geography
- Location: Longview, Washington, U.S.
- Topo map: USGS Kelso

Mount Coffin was a promontory in what is now Longview, Cowlitz County, Washington, U.S. It served as native burial grounds for the Cowlitz Tribe, who practiced above-ground interment of their deceased. The memaloose illahee, or cemetery was named by Lieutenant William Robert Broughton of George Vancouver's expedition aboard HMS Chatham in 1792. The landmark was leveled for its gravel during construction of the Port of Longview.

== Physical observation ==
Mount Coffin was 240 feet (73 m) tall and was formed by sediment carried by the Columbia River and Cowlitz River, which coagulated at the merging point of these two entities. The material consisted of basalt sediment, mainly material derived from volcanic ash.

== Historical Record ==
=== Prehistory and Expeditionary Times ===
In 1792, Lieutenant William Robert Broughton of Vancouver's expedition aboard HMS Chatham explored the lower Columbia; he recorded: "a remarkable mount, about which were placed several canoes, containing dead bodies; to this was given the name of Mount Coffin."

"Coffin Mountain was so called because of the Indian burying ground which was observed there where the dead were placed, as was the custom, aloft in primitive coffins supported by stakes."

In November 1805, William Clark reported the hill as a "very remarkable Knob rising from the edge of the water". He said it was about 80 feet (20 m) high, and "about 200 paces around at its Base."

William Clark described interaction with the indigenous population: trading beaver skins, berries, salmon, and wappato. Meriwether Lewis commented between their variance in speech from the tribes that lived farther inland. Due to the Skillute's trading patterns along the Pacific coast they spoke a different pidgin that adopted coastal variances than the tribes who lived farther inland.

In 1835, John Kirk Townsend explored Mount Coffin, he reports:

"[the burial site] consisted of a great number of canoes containing bodies of Indians, each being carefully wrapped in blankets, and supplied with many of his personal effects in the form of weapons and implements...The same provident care for the deceased that prevails among the hunting tribes of the prairies is observable among the piscatorial tribes of the rivers and sea-coast. Among the latter the Indian is wrapped in his mantle of skins, laid in his canoe with his paddle, his fishing-spear, and other implements beside him, and placed aloft on some rock or eminence overlooking the river, or bay, or lake that he had frequented. He is fitted out to launch away upon those placid streams…which are prepared in the next world for those who have acquitted themselves as good sons, good fathers…during their mortal sojourn."

Because the Skillute practiced infant head flattening, postmortem examination of the cerebrum became a point of interest by physicians. In 1825, John Scouler found an opportunity "to procure a specimen of their compressed skulls." Again in 1847, a bateau captain described as a "curio hunter", stripped "valuables from a body on Coffin Rock."

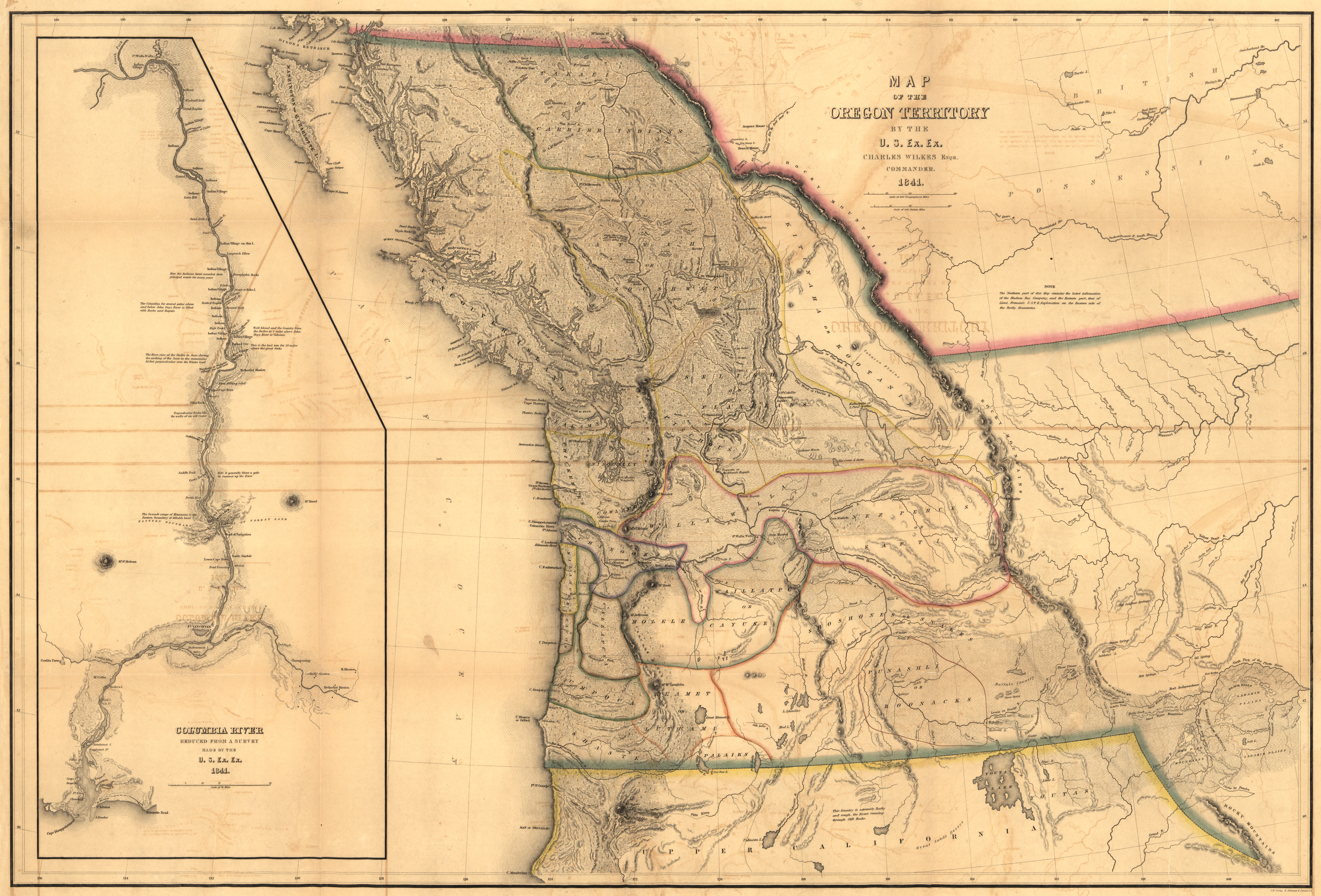
Pacific Northwest: 1841 Map of the Oregon Territory from "Narrative of the United States Exploring Expedition." Philadelphia: 1845

Another contentious point of contact is described:

"In August 1841, Lieutenant Charles Wilkes traveled down the river as part of the U.S. Exploring Expedition and he used Mount Coffin to make astronomical observations. One of Wilkes's campfires accidentally destroyed the burial canoes on the rock."

Fever, pestilence, and disease ravaged among the living indigenous population. Symptoms described by one trader representing McLoughlin, a chief agent at the Hudson's Bay Company in Fort Vancouver, Washington, about 40 miles (60 km) from Mount Coffin, were descriptions characteristic of malaria, an endemic disease with fatal termination.

=== The Industrial Revolution ===
In 1900 Frederick Weyerhaeuser bought 900,000 acres (3,600 km^{2}) of railroad grant land, looked favorably towards prospects in the Northwestern United States and soon began western operations. At the end of World War I, Robert Alexander Long purchased from the Weyerhaeuser Timber Company a 23,851 acres (97 km^{2}) tract in southwestern Washington that rest adjacent to Mount Coffin; it contained nearly 2,500,000,000 board feet (5,900,000 m^{3}) of timber, he soon expanded to more than 70,000 acres (280 km^{2}). In 1922 studies of possible mill sites indicated: to dike the valley located at the mouth of the Cowlitz River would be economical. Rather than executing these plans, the area was developed into a city that would host investors; the city is now Longview, Washington. In June 1924, the Long–Bell lumber mill opened as the largest lumber producer in the world.

Frederick Weyerhaeuser opened a mill adjacent to the Long-Bell operation, encompassing Mount Coffin. Shortly after, in 1929, Mount Coffin was dynamited and quarried. After cutting 8,700,000,000 board feet (21,000,000 m^{3}) of lumber, Long's two great sawmills were dismantled in 1960.

"The old Long-Bell Mill sheds – now derelict – still stand near the port, difficult to reach yet spectacular because they are so enormous…[The sheds] are each about 600 feet long. They are built of massive timbers representative of the original, huge-scale forest of western Washington. Such buildings will never again be built."

Weyerhaeuser continued pulp and paperboard manufacturing. In 1964, a federal suit was filed against Weyerhaeuser in Longview, Washington, for "discharge of refuse into navigable waterways." In 1979 the United States General Accounting Office listed the Weyerhaeuser Company in Longview as a potential superfund site caused by metal contamination. Since then, Weyerhaeuser Company has innovated ways of utilizing clarifiers, biomass fuels, hog fuel, and newsprint sludges to create steam and cogenerated electricity, from such organic wastes, to decrease pollution. As of 2009, Weyerhaeuser reported "a net loss of $1.212 billion for the fourth quarter, or $5.73 per share, on net sales from continuing operations of $1.8 billion."
