= Clatsop State Forest =

State forest in Oregon, United States

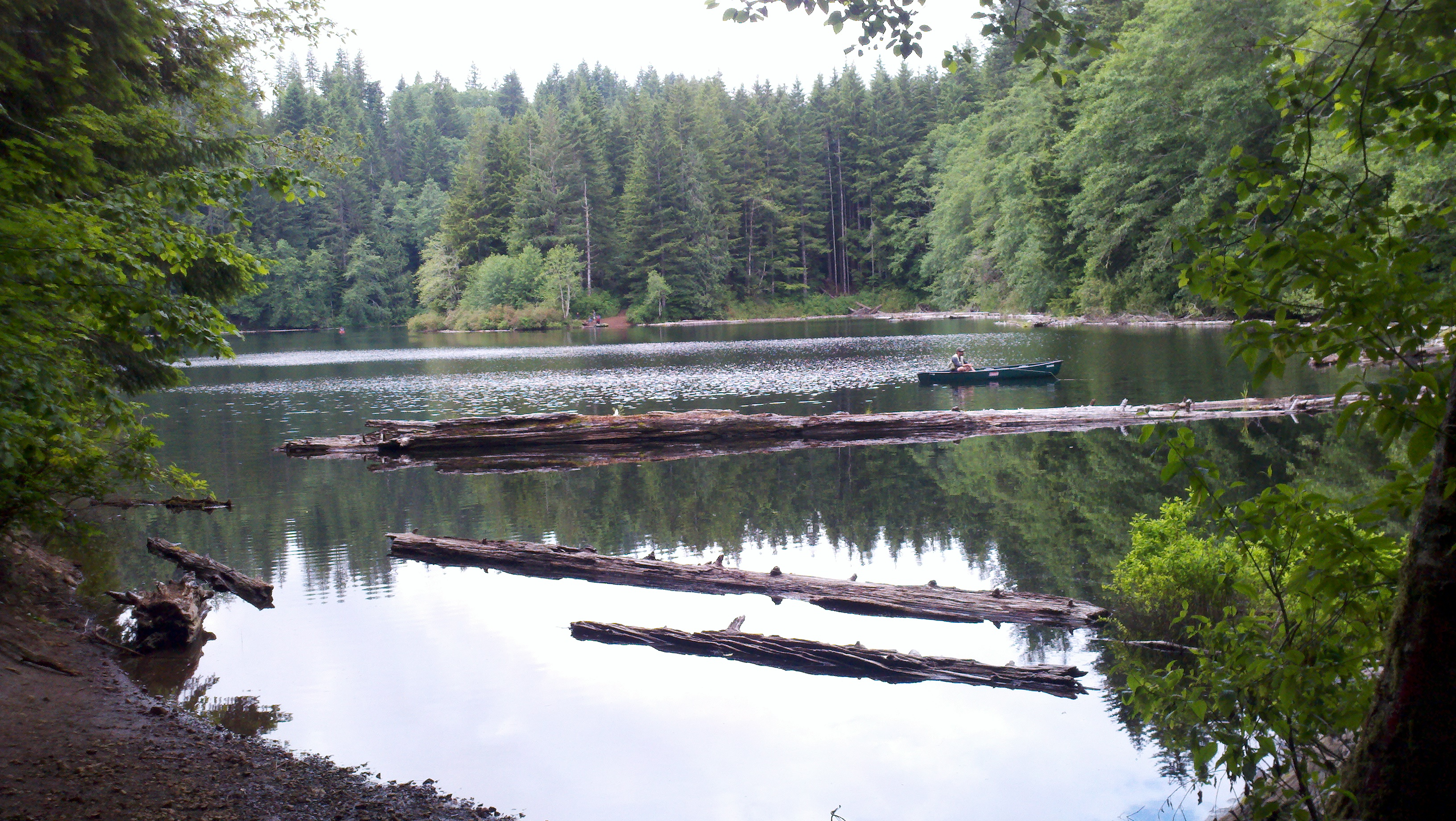
- Lost Lake in the Clatsop State Forest (Astoria District), July 2012
- Interactive map of Clatsop State Forest
- Type: State forest
- Location: Oregon, United States
- Coordinates: 45°56′13″N 123°13′09″W
- Area: 136,000 acres (550 km^{2})
- Operator: Oregon Department of Forestry

Clatsop State Forest is a state forest in Clatsop and Columbia counties in the U.S. state of Oregon. It is managed by the Astoria District of the Oregon Department of Forestry.
