= Youngs River =

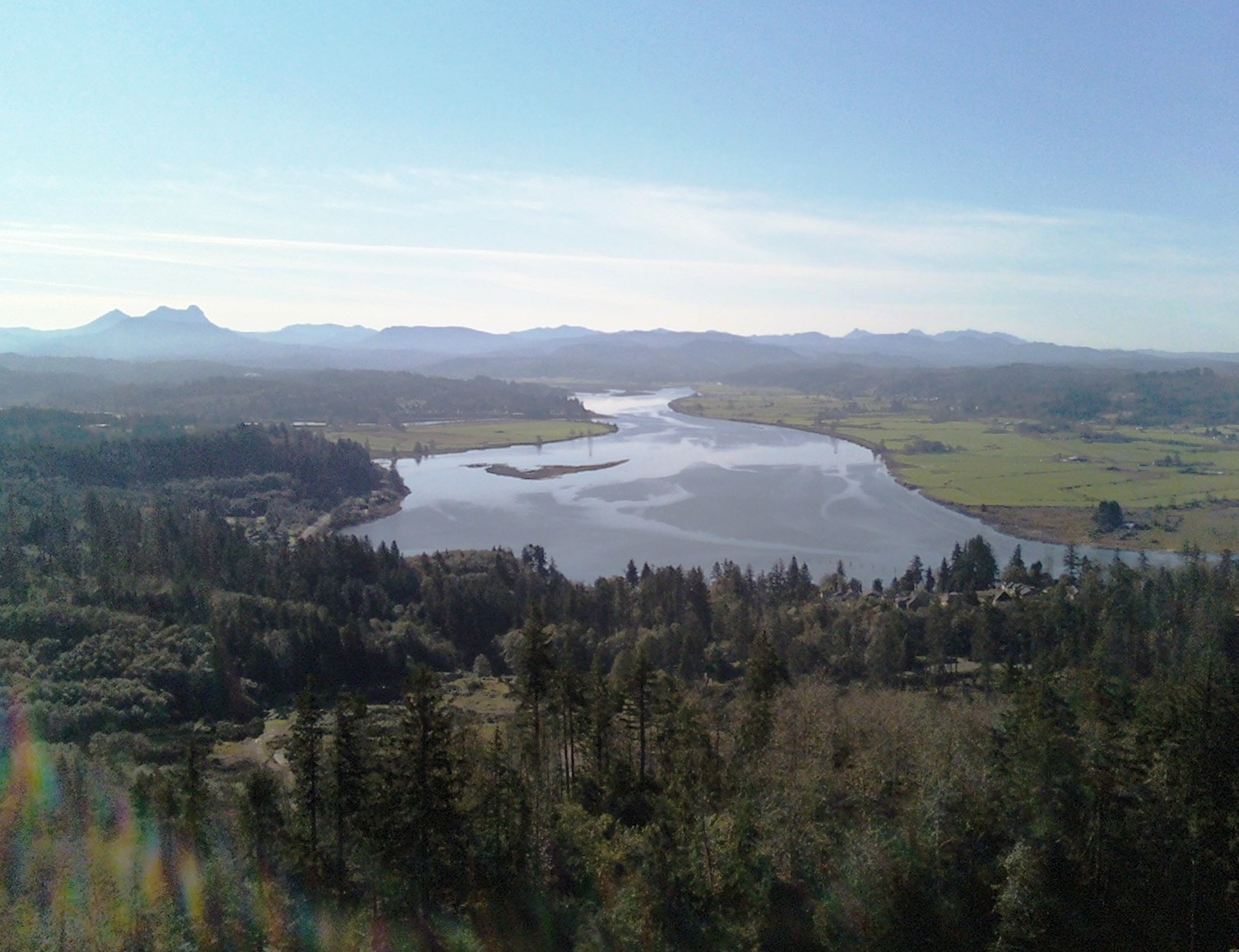
- The river as seen from Astoria

- Location of the mouth of Youngs River in Oregon
- Etymology: Given by explorer William Robert Broughton, a lieutenant in the British Royal Navy, in honor of Sir George Young of the Royal Navy

Location
- Country: United States
- State: Oregon
- County: Clatsop County

Physical characteristics
- Source: Northern Oregon Coast Range
  - location: Clatsop County, Oregon
  - coordinates: 45°59′07″N 123°37′28″W
  - elevation: 1,131 ft (345 m)
- Mouth: Youngs Bay
  - location: near Astoria, Clatsop County, Oregon
  - coordinates: 46°10′51″N 123°52′31″W
  - elevation: 0 ft (0 m)
- Length: 27 mi (43 km)

The Youngs River is a tributary of the Columbia River, approximately 27 miles (43 km) long, in northwest Oregon in the United States. It drains part of the Northern Oregon Coast Range in the extreme northwest corner of state, entering the Columbia via Youngs Bay just approximately 10 miles (16 km) from its mouth.

It rises in a remote section of the mountains of central Clatsop County, north of Saddle Mountain State Natural Area. It flows generally northwest, passing over Youngs River Falls. The falls were encountered in 1806 by a hunting party of the Lewis and Clark Expedition from nearby Fort Clatsop and documented in William Clark's journals. It broadens in a large estuary and enters the south end of Youngs Bay on the Columbia at Astoria. It receives the Klaskanine River from the east approximately 5 miles (8 km) south of Astoria. It receives the Wallooskee River from the east approximately 2 miles (3 km) south of Astoria.

Named tributaries of Youngs River from source to mouth are Fall Creek and South Fork Youngs River, then Fox, Osgood, Rock, Bayney, Wawa, and Moosmoos creeks followed by the Klaskanine River. Below that come Cooperage, Battle Creek, Tucker, Casey, Binder, and Cook sloughs followed by the Wallooskee River. Further downstream are Crosel, Brown, and Craig creeks followed by Knowland Slough and the Lewis and Clark River.

About 13 miles (21 km) from the mouth of the river are Youngs River Falls, a 54-foot (16 m) tall waterfall.

== See also ==
- Skipanon River
- List of rivers of Oregon
- List of tributaries of the Columbia River
