= Youngs River Falls =

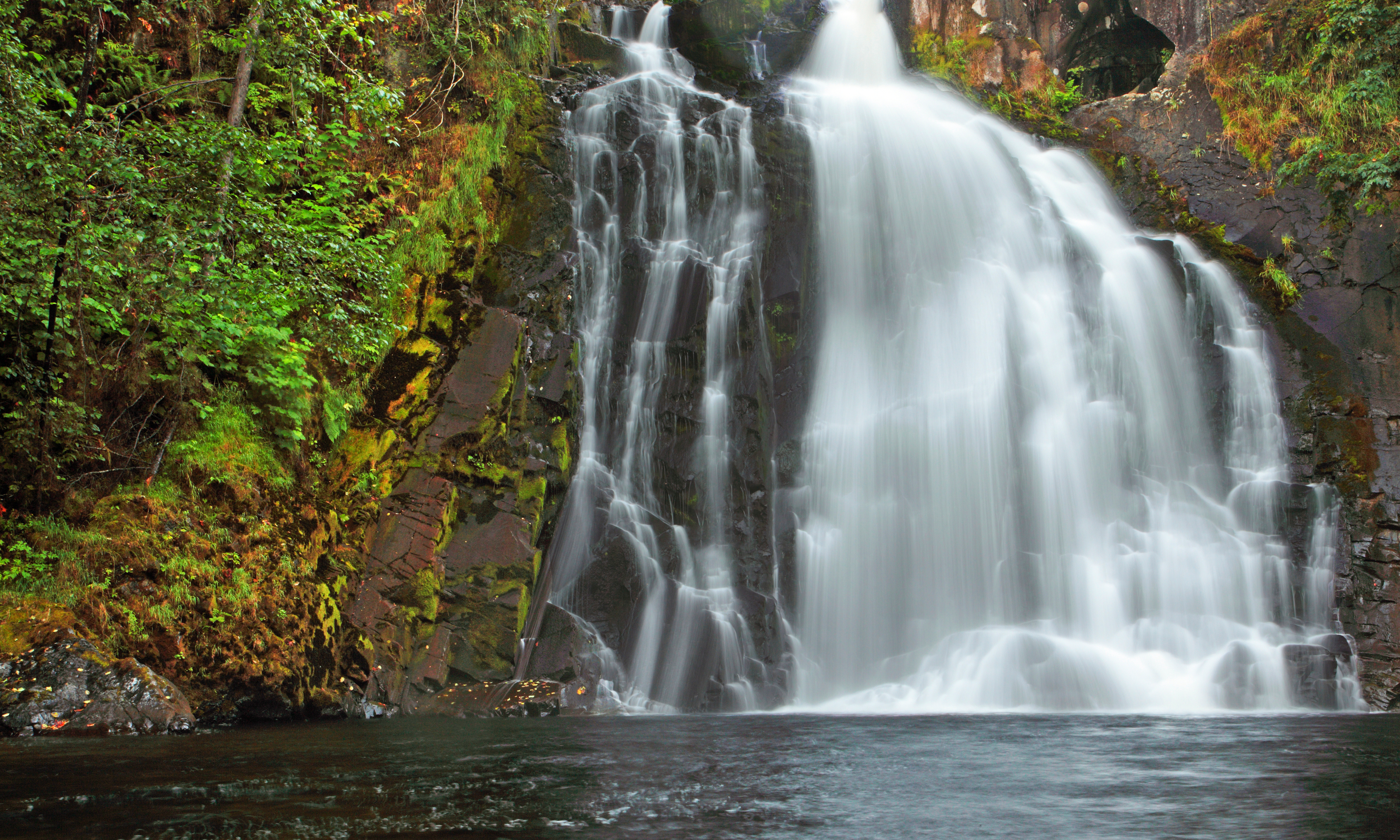
- Youngs River Falls in late summer
- Interactive map of Youngs River Falls
- Location: Clatsop County, Oregon, United States
- Coordinates: 46.067053°N 123.789859°W
- Type: Cascade
- Elevation: 10 ft (3 m)
- Total height: 54 ft (16 m)
- Number of drops: 1
- Total width: 45 ft (14 m)
- Watercourse: Youngs River

Youngs River Falls is a 54-foot (16 m) tall waterfall on the Youngs River in central Clatsop County, northwestern Oregon, United States. They are located about 10 miles (16 km) south of Astoria.

== History ==
The first Americans to report on the falls were members of a hunting party from the Lewis and Clark Expedition, in March 1806.

== In the media ==
The falls have appeared in movies such as Free Willy 2: The Adventure Home, Benji the Hunted and Teenage Mutant Ninja Turtles III.

In July 2014, Tod Gary Wagoner, of Williamsburg, Colorado, died after jumping from the falls, the "first [such] fatality at the falls in a while." In April 2016, Joseph T. Nestor, a 34-year-old Astoria man, fell and died from injuries at the falls.
