= Delena, Oregon =

Unincorporated community in the state of Oregon, United States

- Unincorporated community
- Location within Oregon Location within the United States
- Coordinates: 46°05′54″N 123°04′26″W
- Country: United States
- State: Oregon
- County: Columbia
- Elevation: 453 ft (138 m)
- Time zone: UTC-8 (Pacific (PST))
  - Summer (DST): UTC-7 (PDT)
- ZIP code: 97016
- Area codes: 503 and 971
- Coordinates and elevation from Geographic Names Information System

Delena is an unincorporated community in Columbia County, Oregon, United States. It lies along U.S. Route 30 slightly west of Alston and about halfway between Rainier on the east and Clatskanie on the west.

Delena had a post office that operated intermittently from April 22, 1892, to March 15, 1922. Lincoln J. Meserve was the first of nine postmasters at this location.

Accounts of the origin of the community's name have varied, according to Oregon Geographic Names (OGN). It may refer to a mythological name that Meserve found in a book or it may be the name of someone in Meserve's family or it may refer to a place in Nebraska. In 1947, W. N. Meserve, Meserve's brother, told the OGN compiler that the mythological explanation was correct, and the compiler could find no place named Delena in Nebraska.
