= Mayger, Oregon =

Unincorporated community in the state of Oregon, United States

- Unincorporated community
- Location within Oregon Location within the United States
- Coordinates: 46.163°N 123.108°W
- Country: United States
- State: Oregon
- County: Columbia
- Elevation: 141 ft (43 m)
- Time zone: UTC-8 (Pacific (PST))
  - Summer (DST): UTC-7 (PDT)
- ZIP code: 97016
- Area codes: 503 and 971

Mayger is an unincorporated community in Columbia County, Oregon, United States. Fishing is important to Mayger. It was originally the site of Frenchman Charles Mayger's Mayger Logging Company, which he sold in 1886 to William F. Slaughter. Mayger's post office was established three years later and its first postmaster was Charles Mayger. It closed in 1961. Mayger is served by the Clatskanie, Oregon post office.
