= Vernonia, Oregon =

- City
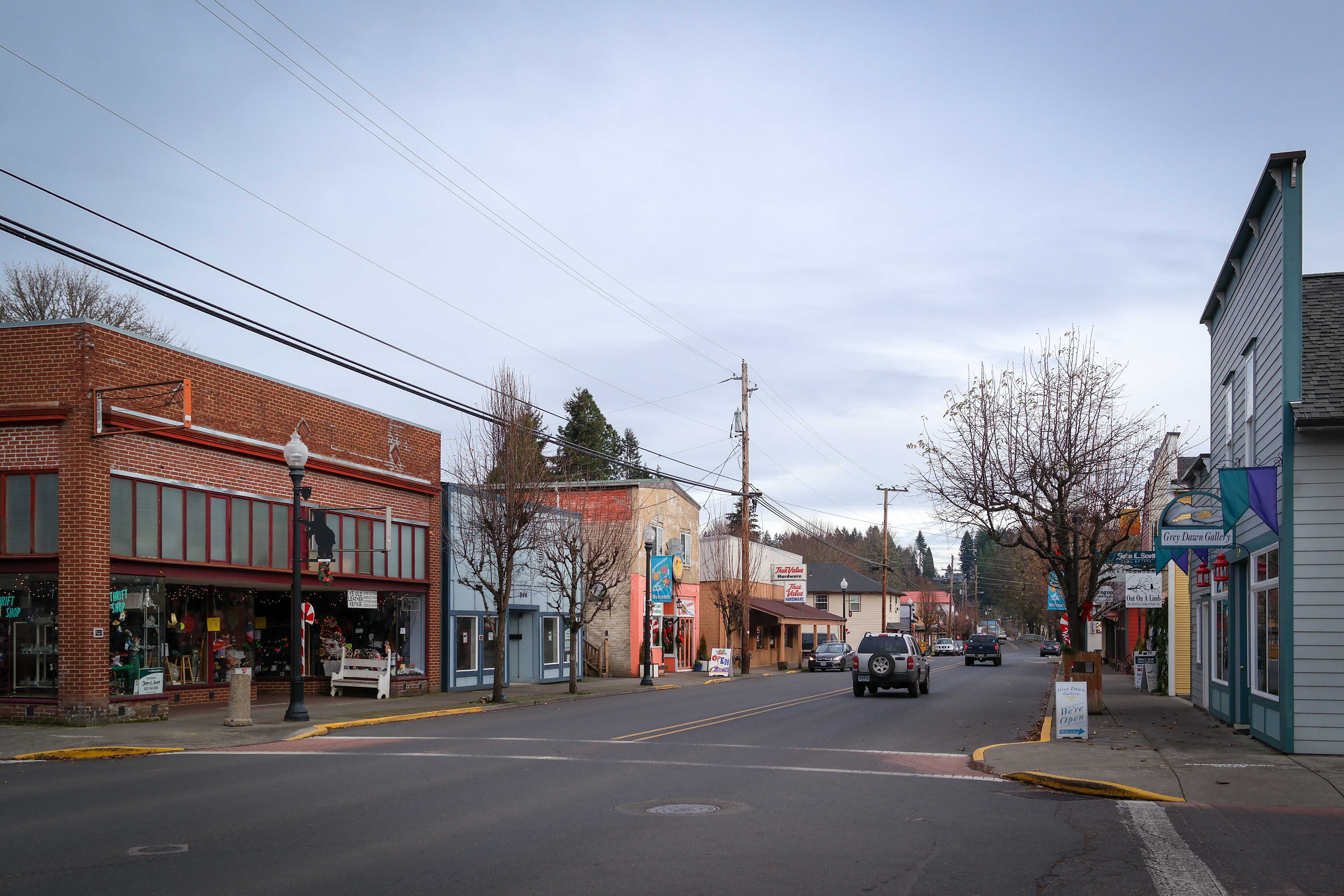
- Downtown Vernonia

- Seal

- Location in Oregon
- Coordinates: 45°51′40″N 123°11′00″W
- Country: United States
- State: Oregon
- County: Columbia
- Incorporated: 1891; 135 years ago

Government
  - Mayor: Rick Hobart

Area
  - Total: 1.69 sq mi (4.38 km^{2})
  - Land: 1.64 sq mi (4.25 km^{2})
  - Water: 0.050 sq mi (0.13 km^{2})
- Elevation: 774 ft (236 m)

Population (2020)
  - Total: 2,374
  - Density: 1,445.3/sq mi (558.05/km^{2})
- Time zone: UTC-8 (Pacific)
  - Summer (DST): UTC-7 (Pacific)
- ZIP code: 97064
- Area codes: 503 and 971
- FIPS code: 41-77250
- GNIS feature ID: 2412152
- Website: www.vernonia-or.gov

Vernonia// is a city in Columbia County, Oregon, United States. It is located on the Nehalem River, in a valley on the eastern side of the Northern Oregon Coast Range that is the heart of one of the most important timber-producing areas of the state. Logging has played a large role in the history of the city. The population was 2,374 at the 2020 census.

== History ==
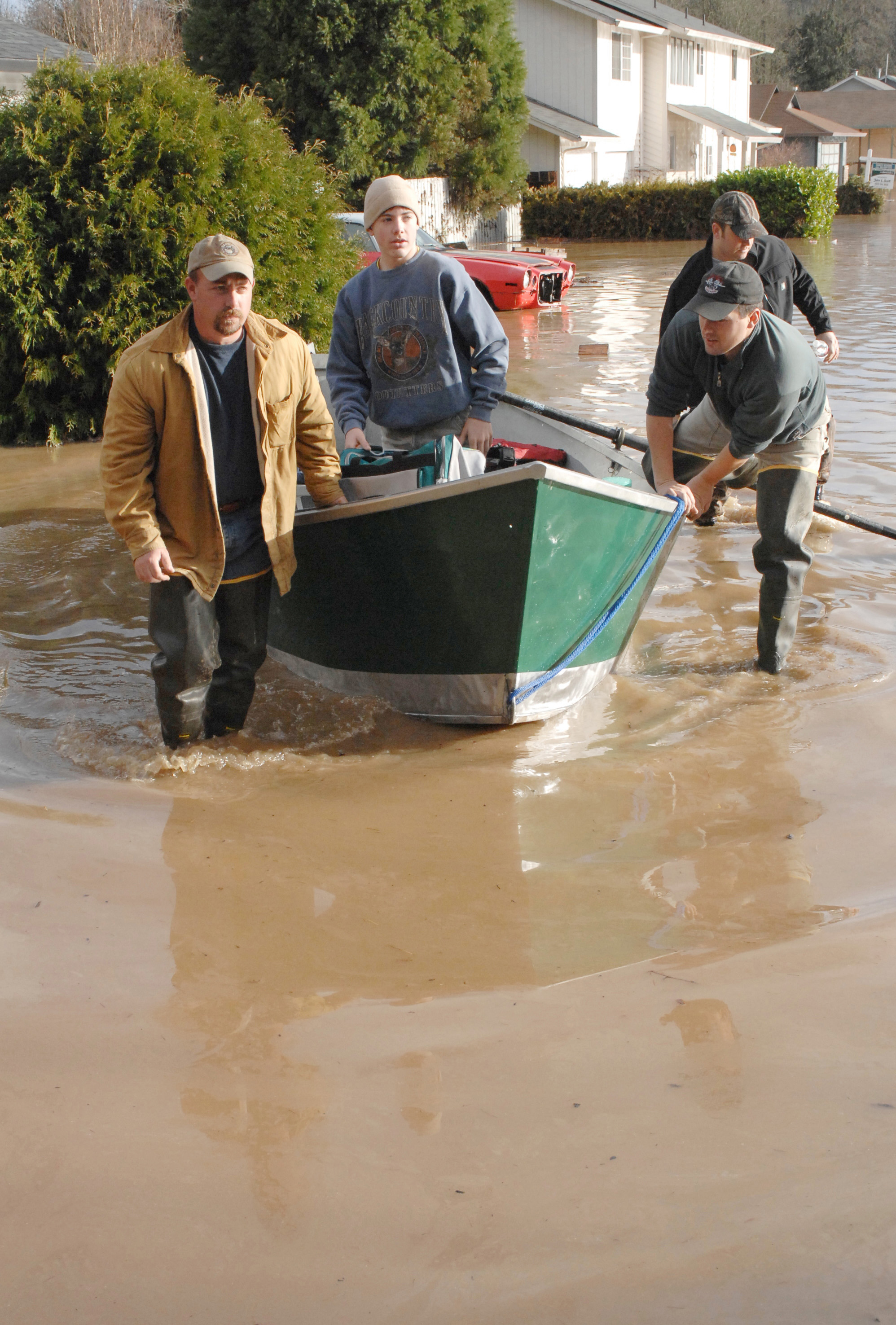
Vernonia during the 2007 flooding

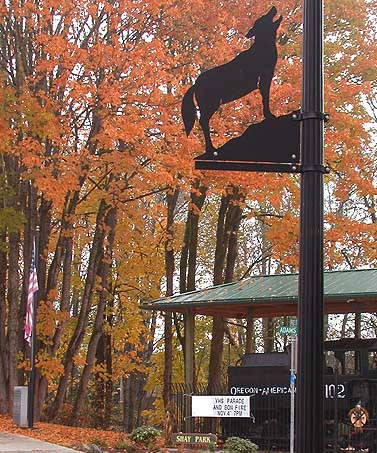
View of the Shay locomotive in Shay Park along Rock Creek in Vernonia

The community was first settled in 1874 by the Parker and Van Blaricom families. Cousins Judson Weed and Ozias Cherrington, both of Ohio, arrived in 1876. Sometime afterwards, the question of a name for the community came up, and Cherrington suggested the name of his daughter (Vernona) in Ohio, which was adopted. Due to a clerical error during the incorporation process, an "i" was inserted into the name. Cherrington died in a farming accident in 1894, never having seen his daughter since his departure from Ohio.

Vernonia started to become more than an isolated farming community on July 10, 1924, when the Oregon-American Lumber Company opened a state-of-the-art lumber mill, which was supported by a railroad line connecting Vernonia to the rest of the country. Oregon-American merged with Long-Bell Lumber Company in May 1953, which itself merged with International Paper in November 1957. International Paper judged the mill antiquated, and closed it on December 20, 1957.

The city has been severely impacted by floods on multiple occasions. The rains that caused the Willamette Valley Flood of 1996 flooded Vernonia as well; some homes in the floodplain were elevated, and some flooring materials were replaced, mitigating some damage from later flooding. In 2007, heavy storms that impacted the Pacific Northwest washed out roads and destroyed homes, cars, and communications infrastructure. Despite preparations in 1996, in some parts of town flood water reached 4 feet (1.2 m) above the 100 year base flood elevation. In the wake of the 2007 flood, Vernonia School District voters approved a $13 million bond in 2009 to build a new K-12 school in Vernonia. The new school opened in fall 2012.

== Community events ==
The Friendship Jamboree is an annual event inaugurated in 1957 and currently held on the first full weekend of August.

== Geography ==
According to the United States Census Bureau, the city has a total area of 1.66 square miles (4.30 km^{2}), of which 1.61 square miles (4.17 km^{2}) is land and 0.05 square miles (0.13 km^{2}) is water.

=== Climate ===
This region experiences warm (but not hot) and dry summers, with no average monthly temperatures above 71.6 °F (22.0 °C). According to the Köppen Climate Classification system, Vernonia has a warm-summer Mediterranean climate, abbreviated "Csb" on climate maps.

Climate data for Vernonia, Oregon, 1991–2020 normals, extremes 1967–present
Month	Jan	Feb	Mar	Apr	May	Jun	Jul	Aug	Sep	Oct	Nov	Dec	Year
Record high °F (°C)	66 (19)	72 (22)	79 (26)	89 (32)	99 (37)	111 (44)	104 (40)	103 (39)	103 (39)	93 (34)	73 (23)	64 (18)	111 (44)
Mean maximum °F (°C)	55.2 (12.9)	60.7 (15.9)	68.3 (20.2)	76.9 (24.9)	84.7 (29.3)	88.0 (31.1)	93.4 (34.1)	94.1 (34.5)	89.4 (31.9)	77.3 (25.2)	61.7 (16.5)	54.1 (12.3)	97.4 (36.3)
Mean daily maximum °F (°C)	45.7 (7.6)	49.4 (9.7)	53.6 (12.0)	58.6 (14.8)	65.5 (18.6)	69.9 (21.1)	77.3 (25.2)	78.2 (25.7)	73.1 (22.8)	61.4 (16.3)	50.6 (10.3)	44.3 (6.8)	60.6 (15.9)
Daily mean °F (°C)	38.7 (3.7)	40.2 (4.6)	43.5 (6.4)	47.1 (8.4)	52.9 (11.6)	57.2 (14.0)	62.3 (16.8)	62.5 (16.9)	58.0 (14.4)	49.8 (9.9)	42.4 (5.8)	37.8 (3.2)	49.4 (9.6)
Mean daily minimum °F (°C)	31.6 (−0.2)	30.9 (−0.6)	33.5 (0.8)	35.6 (2.0)	40.3 (4.6)	44.4 (6.9)	47.2 (8.4)	46.9 (8.3)	42.9 (6.1)	38.3 (3.5)	34.2 (1.2)	31.3 (−0.4)	38.1 (3.4)
Mean minimum °F (°C)	18.5 (−7.5)	19.7 (−6.8)	24.1 (−4.4)	27.4 (−2.6)	30.7 (−0.7)	35.3 (1.8)	38.5 (3.6)	37.7 (3.2)	32.9 (0.5)	25.8 (−3.4)	21.6 (−5.8)	18.6 (−7.4)	12.4 (−10.9)
Record low °F (°C)	−2 (−19)	−6 (−21)	13 (−11)	22 (−6)	27 (−3)	30 (−1)	33 (1)	32 (0)	23 (−5)	10 (−12)	2 (−17)	−7 (−22)	−7 (−22)
Average precipitation inches (mm)	6.94 (176)	5.34 (136)	5.30 (135)	3.74 (95)	2.39 (61)	1.44 (37)	0.39 (9.9)	0.55 (14)	1.79 (45)	4.12 (105)	7.70 (196)	8.33 (212)	48.03 (1,221.9)
Average snowfall inches (cm)	0.3 (0.76)	0.6 (1.5)	0.0 (0.0)	0.0 (0.0)	0.0 (0.0)	0.0 (0.0)	0.0 (0.0)	0.0 (0.0)	0.0 (0.0)	0.0 (0.0)	0.0 (0.0)	0.2 (0.51)	1.1 (2.77)
Average precipitation days (≥ 0.01 in)	20.0	16.8	19.5	17.4	12.4	9.5	3.7	3.5	7.8	14.8	19.8	20.0	165.2
Average snowy days (≥ 0.1 in)	0.2	0.2	0.0	0.0	0.0	0.0	0.0	0.0	0.0	0.0	0.0	0.1	0.5
Source 1: NOAA
Source 2: National Weather Service

== Demographics ==
Historical population
Census	Pop.	Note	%±
1900	62		—
1910	69		11.3%
1920	142		105.8%
1930	1,625		1,044.4%
1940	1,412		−13.1%
1950	1,521		7.7%
1960	1,089		−28.4%
1970	1,643		50.9%
1980	1,785		8.6%
1990	1,808		1.3%
2000	2,228		23.2%
2010	2,151		−3.5%
2020	2,374		10.4%
U.S. Decennial Census

=== 2020 census ===
As of the 2020 census, Vernonia had a population of 2,374. The median age was 38.8 years. 24.8% of residents were under the age of 18 and 15.3% of residents were 65 years of age or older. For every 100 females there were 103.4 males, and for every 100 females age 18 and over there were 103.6 males age 18 and over.

0% of residents lived in urban areas, while 100.0% lived in rural areas.

There were 919 households in Vernonia, of which 31.6% had children under the age of 18 living in them. Of all households, 48.1% were married-couple households, 20.2% were households with a male householder and no spouse or partner present, and 23.0% were households with a female householder and no spouse or partner present. About 25.9% of all households were made up of individuals and 11.4% had someone living alone who was 65 years of age or older.

There were 985 housing units, of which 6.7% were vacant. Among occupied housing units, 78.5% were owner-occupied and 21.5% were renter-occupied. The homeowner vacancy rate was 1.4% and the rental vacancy rate was 4.8%.

Racial composition as of the 2020 census
Race	Number	Percent
White	2,061	86.8%
Black or African American	10	0.4%
American Indian and Alaska Native	43	1.8%
Asian	11	0.5%
Native Hawaiian and Other Pacific Islander	3	0.1%
Some other race	27	1.1%
Two or more races	219	9.2%
Hispanic or Latino (of any race)	123	5.2%

=== 2010 census ===
As of the census of 2010, there were 2,151 people, 822 households, and 571 families residing in the city. The population density was 1,336.0 inhabitants per square mile (515.8/km^{2}). There were 962 housing units at an average density of 597.5 per square mile (230.7/km^{2}). The racial makeup of the city was 94.1% White, 0.3% African American, 1.3% Native American, 0.5% Asian, 0.2% Pacific Islander, 0.8% from other races, and 2.8% from two or more races. Hispanic or Latino of any race were 4.2% of the population.

There were 822 households, of which 35.5% had children under the age of 18 living with them, 52.6% were married couples living together, 11.1% had a female householder with no husband present, 5.8% had a male householder with no wife present, and 30.5% were non-families. 25.7% of all households were made up of individuals, and 8.9% had someone living alone who was 65 years of age or older. The average household size was 2.61 and the average family size was 3.09.

The median age in the city was 38.2 years. 26.9% of residents were under the age of 18; 7.8% were between the ages of 18 and 24; 25.3% were from 25 to 44; 29.2% were from 45 to 64; and 10.8% were 65 years of age or older. The gender makeup of the city was 51.0% male and 49.0% female.

=== 2000 census ===
As of the census of 2000, there were 2,228 people, 789 households, and 583 families residing in the city. The population density was 1,444.2 inhabitants per square mile (557.6/km^{2}). There were 880 housing units at an average density of 570.4 per square mile (220.2/km^{2}). The racial makeup of the city was 95.38% White, 0.18% African American, 1.39% Native American, 0.49% Asian, 0.09% Pacific Islander, 0.54% from other races, and 1.93% from two or more races. Hispanic or Latino of any race were 2.24% of the population. 19.6% were of German, 14.7% English, 9.5% American, 8.6% Irish and 5.3% Scottish ancestry according to Census 2000.

There were 789 households, out of which 41.4% had children under the age of 18 living with them, 59.4% were married couples living together, 10.4% had a female householder with no husband present, and 26.0% were non-families. 20.9% of all households were made up of individuals, and 7.4% had someone living alone who was 65 years of age or older. The average household size was 2.82 and the average family size was 3.29.

In the city, the population was spread out, with 34.0% under the age of 18, 6.5% from 18 to 24, 30.8% from 25 to 44, 18.9% from 45 to 64, and 9.8% who were 65 years of age or older. The median age was 32 years. For every 100 females, there were 99.5 males. For every 100 females age 18 and over, there were 99.3 males.

The median income for a household in the city was $41,181, and the median income for a family was $48,563. Males had a median income of $37,447 versus $24,219 for females. The per capita income for the city was $16,647. About 8.6% of families and 9.7% of the population were below the poverty line, including 12.0% of those under age 18 and 6.4% of those age 65 or over.

== Transportation ==
Oregon Route 47 is the only major highway serving Vernonia, providing access from the lower Columbia River and U.S. Route 30 to the north, and from U.S. Route 26 to the south. The Banks–Vernonia State Trail, a rails-to-trails conversion featuring a 21-mile (34 km) raised path for bicyclists, pedestrians, and horseback riders, roughly parallels Route 47 to the south of Vernonia. The Crown Zellerbach trail is a conversion of old logging roads (themselves a conversion from old railroad way) to a trail for mountain biking, hiking, and horseback riding. This trail extends over 20 miles (32 km) Vernonia to Scappoose. In 2023 the trail was designated as a National Recreation Trail to be included in the National Trail System.

=== Public transit ===
Vernonia Currently has no Public Transportation Routes. However Dial-A-Ride Service is available though, through the Columbia County Rider

=== Airport ===
Vernonia Municipal Airport (FAA: 05S) is a city-owned, public-use airport located two nautical miles (3.7 km) west of the central business district of Vernonia.

== In popular culture ==
The December 2007 flooding in Vernonia was featured in the first season of the television show Ax Men.

Vernonia has also appeared in several films, including Ring of Fire (1961), The Vernonia Incident (1989), Thumbsucker (2005), Tillamook Treasure (2006), The Water Man (2020), and Twilight (2008).

== See also ==
- Vernonia High School
