= Columbia County, Oregon =

County in Oregon, United States

- County
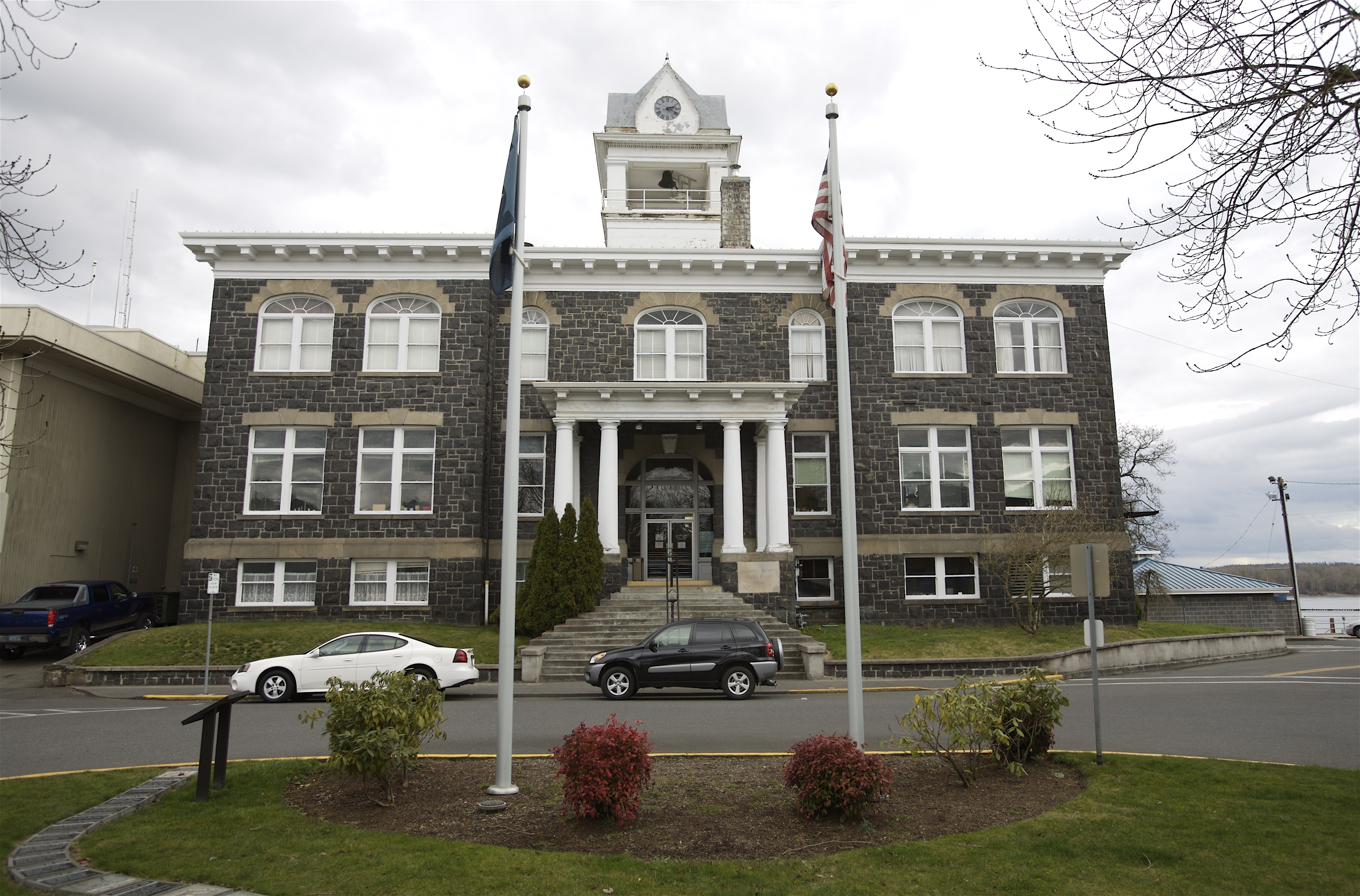
- Columbia County Courthouse in St. Helens

- Location within the U.S. state of Oregon
- Coordinates: 45°57′N 123°05′W
- Country: United States
- State: Oregon
- Founded: January 16, 1854
- Named for: Columbia River
- Seat: St. Helens
- Largest city: St. Helens

Area
  - Total: 688 sq mi (1,780 km^{2})
  - Land: 657 sq mi (1,700 km^{2})
  - Water: 31 sq mi (80 km^{2}) 4.5%

Population (2020)
  - Total: 52,589
  - Estimate (2025): 54,091 ▲
  - Density: 75/sq mi (29/km^{2})
- Time zone: UTC−8 (Pacific)
  - Summer (DST): UTC−7 (PDT)
- Congressional district: 1st
- Website: www.columbiacountyor.gov

Columbia County is one of the 36 counties in the U.S. state of Oregon. As of the 2020 census, the population was 52,589. The county seat is St. Helens.

== History ==
The Chinook and Clatskanie Native American peoples inhabited this region for centuries prior to the arrival of Robert Gray, captain of the ship Columbia Rediviva, in 1792. The Lewis and Clark Expedition traveled and camped along the Columbia River shore in the area later known as Columbia County in late 1805 and again on their return journey in early 1806.

Columbia County was created in 1854 from the northern half of Washington County. Milton served as the county seat until 1857 when it was moved to St. Helens.

Columbia County has been afflicted by numerous flooding disasters, the most recent in December 2007. Heavy rains caused the Nehalem River to escape its banks and flood the city of Vernonia and rural areas nearby. Columbia County received a presidential disaster declaration for this event.

In the 1910s the Socialist Party of Oregon won a handful of votes. This party was distinct from the better-known SPO which operated throughout the twentieth century.

Map of Columbia County

== Geography ==
According to the United States Census Bureau, the county has an area of 688 square miles (1,780 km^{2}), of which 657 square miles (1,700 km^{2}) is land and 31 square miles (80 km^{2}) (4.5%) is water. It is Oregon's third-smallest county by land area and fourth-smallest by total area.

=== Adjacent counties ===
- Wahkiakum County, Washington (northwest)
- Cowlitz County, Washington (northeast)
- Clark County, Washington (east)
- Multnomah County (southeast)
- Washington County (south)
- Clatsop County (west)

=== National protected area ===
- Julia Butler Hansen National Wildlife Refuge (part)

== Demographics ==
Historical population
Census	Pop.	Note	%±
1860	532		—
1870	863		62.2%
1880	2,042		136.6%
1890	5,191		154.2%
1900	6,237		20.2%
1910	10,580		69.6%
1920	13,960		31.9%
1930	20,047		43.6%
1940	20,971		4.6%
1950	22,967		9.5%
1960	22,379		−2.6%
1970	28,790		28.6%
1980	35,646		23.8%
1990	37,557		5.4%
2000	43,560		16.0%
2010	49,351		13.3%
2020	52,589		6.6%
2025 (est.)	54,091	▲	2.9%
U.S. Decennial Census; 1790–1960 1900–1990; 1990–2000 2010–2020

=== 2020 census ===
Columbia County, Oregon – Racial and ethnic composition Note: the US Census treats Hispanic/Latino as an ethnic category. This table excludes Latinos from the racial categories and assigns them to a separate category. Hispanics/Latinos may be of any race.
Race / Ethnicity (NH = Non-Hispanic)	Pop 1980	Pop 1990	Pop 2000	Pop 2010	Pop 2020	% 1980	% 1990	% 2000	% 2010	% 2020
White alone (NH)	34,561	36,067	40,576	44,563	44,228	96.96%	96.03%	93.15%	90.30%	84.10%
Black or African American alone (NH)	35	37	97	195	300	0.10%	0.10%	0.22%	0.40%	0.57%
Native American or Alaska Native alone (NH)	281	485	540	590	618	0.79%	1.29%	1.24%	1.20%	1.18%
Asian alone (NH)	136	273	246	446	561	0.38%	0.73%	0.56%	0.90%	1.07%
Native Hawaiian or Pacific Islander alone (NH)	x	x	39	95	117	x	x	0.09%	0.19%	0.22%
Other race alone (NH)	105	11	43	43	267	0.29%	0.03%	0.10%	0.09%	0.51%
Mixed race or Multiracial (NH)	x	x	926	1,432	3,428	x	x	2.13%	2.90%	6.52%
Hispanic or Latino (any race)	528	684	1,093	1,987	3,070	1.48%	1.82%	2.51%	4.03%	5.84%
Total	35,646	37,557	43,560	49,351	52,589	100.00%	100.00%	100.00%	100.00%	100.00%

=== American Community Survey 2025 data ===
The United States Census Bureau estimated that in 2025, Columbia County’s population was 54.091. It was also estimated that the county's population was 82,92% Non-Hispanic White, 7,96% Hispanic or Latino, 0,70% Non-Hispanic Black, 1,36% Asian, 1,25% Native American, 0,33% Pacific Islander, and 5,48% Multiracial.

Total	Population	Percentage
Non-Hispanic White	44.853	82,92%
Hispanic or Latino	4.307	7,96%
Non-Hispanic Black	376	0,70%
Asian	736	1,36%
Native American	677	1,25%
Pacific Islander	179	0,33%
Non-Hispanic Multiracial	2.963	5,48%

As of the 2020 census, the county had a population of 52,589. Of the residents, 20.7% were under the age of 18 and 20.0% were 65 years of age or older; the median age was 43.4 years. For every 100 females there were 100.4 males, and for every 100 females age 18 and over there were 99.9 males. 58.8% of residents lived in urban areas and 41.2% lived in rural areas.

The racial makeup of the county was 86.0% White, 0.6% Black or African American, 1.4% American Indian and Alaska Native, 1.1% Asian, 0.2% Native Hawaiian and Pacific Islander, 1.9% from some other race, and 8.7% from two or more races. Hispanic or Latino residents of any race comprised 5.8% of the population.

There were 20,457 households in the county, of which 28.5% had children under the age of 18 living with them and 21.7% had a female householder with no spouse or partner present. About 24.0% of all households were made up of individuals and 11.9% had someone living alone who was 65 years of age or older.

There were 21,697 housing units, of which 5.7% were vacant. Among occupied housing units, 75.5% were owner-occupied and 24.5% were renter-occupied. The homeowner vacancy rate was 1.3% and the rental vacancy rate was 4.6%.

=== 2010 census ===
As of the 2010 census, there were 49,351 people, 19,183 households, and 13,516 families living in the county. The population density was 75.1 inhabitants per square mile (29.0/km^{2}). There were 20,698 housing units at an average density of 31.5 units per square mile (12.2 units/km^{2}). The racial makeup of the county was 92.5% white, 1.3% American Indian, 0.9% Asian, 0.4% black or African American, 0.2% Pacific islander, 1.2% from other races, and 3.4% from two or more races. Those of Hispanic or Latino origin made up 4.0% of the population. In terms of ancestry, 26.1% were German, 14.5% were English, 14.4% were Irish, 5.9% were Norwegian, and 4.8% were American.

Of the 19,183 households, 32.0% had children under the age of 18 living with them, 55.5% were married couples living together, 9.8% had a female householder with no husband present, 29.5% were non-families, and 23.3% of all households were made up of individuals. The average household size was 2.55 and the average family size was 2.98. The median age was 41.3 years.

The median income for a household in the county was $55,199 and the median income for a family was $62,728. Males had a median income of $52,989 versus $35,558 for females. The per capita income for the county was $24,613. About 6.5% of families and 10.3% of the population were below the poverty line, including 12.7% of those under age 18 and 6.6% of those age 65 or over.

=== 2000 census ===
As of the 2000 census, there were 43,560 people, 16,375 households, and 12,035 families living in the county. The population density was 66 inhabitants per square mile (25/km^{2}). There were 17,572 housing units at an average density of 27 units per square mile (10 units/km^{2}). The racial makeup of the county was 94.42% White, 0.24% Black or African American, 1.33% Native American, 0.59% Asian, 0.10% Pacific Islander, 0.79% from other races, and 2.53% from two or more races. 2.51% of the population were Hispanic or Latino of any race. 21.2% were of German, 10.8% English, 9.4% American, 9.3% Irish and 5.4% Norwegian ancestry.

There were 16,375 households, out of which 34.40% had children under the age of 18 living with them, 60.50% were married couples living together, 8.70% had a female householder with no husband present, and 26.50% were non-families. 21.10% of all households were made up of individuals, and 8.10% had someone living alone who was 65 years of age or older. The average household size was 2.65 and the average family size was 3.06.

In the county, the population was spread out, with 27.30% under the age of 18, 7.00% from 18 to 24, 28.10% from 25 to 44, 26.00% from 45 to 64, and 11.60% who were 65 years of age or older. The median age was 38 years. For every 100 females, there were 100.00 males. For every 100 females age 18 and over, there were 98.10 males.

The median income for a household in the county was $45,797, and the median income for a family was $51,381. Males had a median income of $42,227 versus $27,216 for females. The per capita income for the county was $20,078. About 6.70% of families and 9.10% of the population were below the poverty line, including 11.60% of those under age 18 and 7.00% of those age 65 or over.

== Communities ==
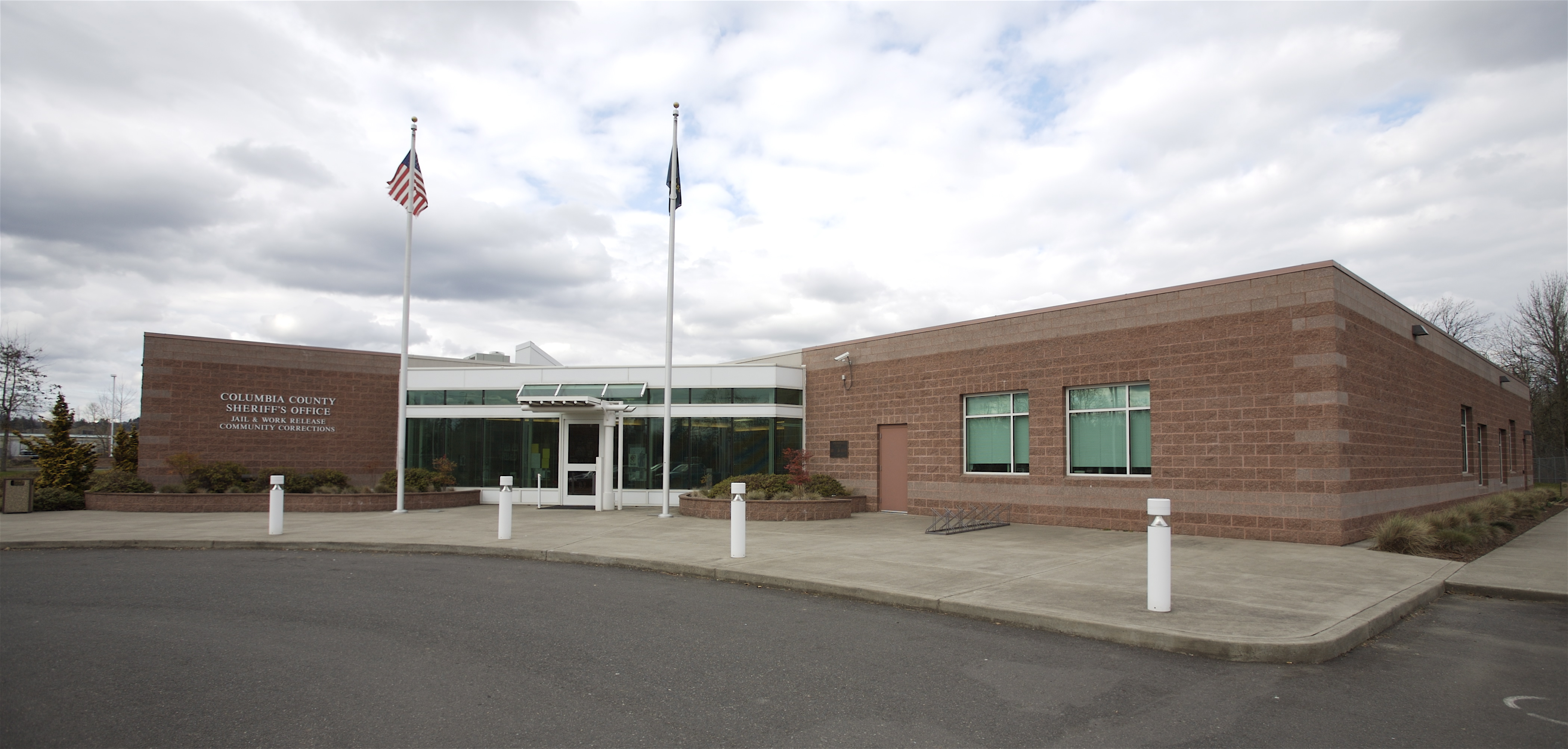
Columbia County Sheriff's Office

=== Cities ===
- Clatskanie
- Columbia City
- Prescott
- Rainier
- St. Helens (county seat)
- Scappoose
- Vernonia

=== Census-designated places ===
- Deer Island
- Warren

=== Unincorporated communities ===
- Alston
- Apiary
- Birkenfeld
- Delena
- Goble
- Inglis
- Keasey
- Kerry
- Lindbergh
- Marshland
- Mayger
- McNulty
- Mist
- Pittsburg
- Quincy
- Woodson
- Yankton

== Media and news ==
Columbia County had newspapers as early as 1891, with the launch of the Clatskanie Chief. The Rainier Review was launched in 1895. The St. Helens Chronicle, which grew out of a series of mergers of the Chronicle, the Sentinel, and the Mist founded in 1881. The Chief and Chronicle merged in December 2023 to form The Columbia County Chronicle & Chief, which served as a newspaper of record for the county. The paper published its final edition on September 25, 2024. The South County Spotlight, launched in 1961, serves the region alone, with a circulation of 3,600. Columbia County has one AM radio station, KOHI AM 1600, which has broadcast continually since 1959. The station is locally owned, with an FCC-estimated weekly listenership of 10,000.

== Emergency Services ==
Columbia River Fire & Rescue provides is one of the providers of emergency services in St.Helens. It's ambulance turned right in front of a bicyclist and ran him over in 2022. CRF&R's ambulance took the victim to the hospital, but billed him $1,862 for the injury they caused. The man filed a lawsuit against the company for nearly a million dollars.

From 2020 to 2026, Columbia County had the highest percentage increase of fatal traffic accidents in Oregon. From 2022 to 2023 it increased by 533%. The majority of those fatalities occurring on Highway 30.

== Government ==
The county is governed by an elected board of three commissioners. Each commissioner is elected to a term of four years. Other elected officials include the sheriff, county clerk, district attorney, treasurer, surveyor, assessor and justice of the peace.

== Politics ==
Between 1932 and 2012, the county was among the most consistently Democratic in the United States in terms of presidential elections. The last Republican to win a majority in Columbia County had been Herbert Hoover in the 1928 presidential election, although before 1932 no Democrat had won a majority in the county since Samuel J. Tilden in 1876. In the 1952 presidential election, Columbia was the only county in Oregon to not back Dwight Eisenhower. However, Columbia County has begun to shift to more conservative politics in recent elections. In 2016, Donald Trump won the county with just under fifty percent of the vote, a break with the tradition of choosing Democrats for president. Trump would repeat his win in the county 4 years later with an absolute majority of the vote.

While Columbia had an 80-year streak of voting for the Democratic nominee, the margin had been as narrow as three percent in 2004 and in 1984.

Columbia County is part of Oregon's 1st congressional district, which is represented by Suzanne Bonamici and has a Cook Partisan Voting Index score of D+18. In the Oregon House of Representatives, nearly all of Columbia County is included within the 31st House District with the northwestern portion in the 32nd District, respectively represented by Republican Brian G. Stout and Democrat Cyrus Javadi. In the Oregon State Senate, Columbia County is in the 16th District, represented by Republican Suzanne Weber.

Columbia County is currently one of 11 counties in Oregon in which therapeutic psilocybin is legal.

United States presidential election results for Columbia County, Oregon
Year	Republican		Democratic		Third party(ies)	
Year	No.	%	No.	%	No.	%
1904	1,301	74.26%	221	12.61%	230	13.13%
1908	1,242	63.69%	454	23.28%	254	13.03%
1912	574	28.05%	507	24.78%	965	47.17%
1916	2,023	53.95%	1,451	38.69%	276	7.36%
1920	2,007	61.53%	970	29.74%	285	8.74%
1924	2,483	56.20%	1,015	22.97%	920	20.82%
1928	3,519	65.21%	1,775	32.89%	102	1.89%
1932	1,975	33.27%	3,643	61.36%	319	5.37%
1936	1,815	23.27%	5,587	71.62%	399	5.11%
1940	2,959	33.72%	5,758	65.63%	57	0.65%
1944	2,696	33.49%	5,213	64.77%	140	1.74%
1948	3,049	36.95%	4,768	57.79%	434	5.26%
1952	4,666	47.45%	5,096	51.82%	72	0.73%
1956	4,275	43.33%	5,592	56.67%	0	0.00%
1960	4,356	43.96%	5,546	55.97%	6	0.06%
1964	2,489	24.24%	7,728	75.26%	51	0.50%
1968	4,208	38.09%	6,064	54.89%	775	7.02%
1972	5,348	43.54%	5,997	48.82%	939	7.64%
1976	5,226	37.71%	8,005	57.76%	628	4.53%
1980	6,623	42.72%	7,124	45.95%	1,758	11.34%
1984	7,811	48.50%	8,219	51.03%	75	0.47%
1988	6,424	40.64%	8,983	56.83%	399	2.52%
1992	5,227	26.94%	8,298	42.77%	5,877	30.29%
1996	6,205	33.58%	9,275	50.20%	2,996	16.22%
2000	9,369	44.20%	10,331	48.74%	1,495	7.05%
2004	11,868	47.63%	12,563	50.42%	486	1.95%
2008	10,413	42.04%	13,390	54.06%	965	3.90%
2012	10,772	45.12%	12,004	50.28%	1,099	4.60%
2016	13,217	49.65%	10,167	38.20%	3,234	12.15%
2020	17,150	53.23%	13,835	42.94%	1,236	3.84%
2024	17,227	54.98%	12,895	41.15%	1,212	3.87%

== Economy ==
The primary industries are wood products and paper manufacturing, trade, construction and horticulture. The extensive stands of old-growth timber, which had attracted many of the early settlers to the area, were completely logged over by the 1950s. Second-growth timber provides the raw material for local lumber and paper mills. About half the county's workforce commutes out of the county to work, most to the nearby Portland, Oregon, metro area. Columbia County's average non-farm employment was 10,740 in 2007. The five largest private employers in Columbia County are Fred Meyer, Cascade Tissue Group, Wal-Mart, OMIC, USIA, and USG.

== Transportation ==
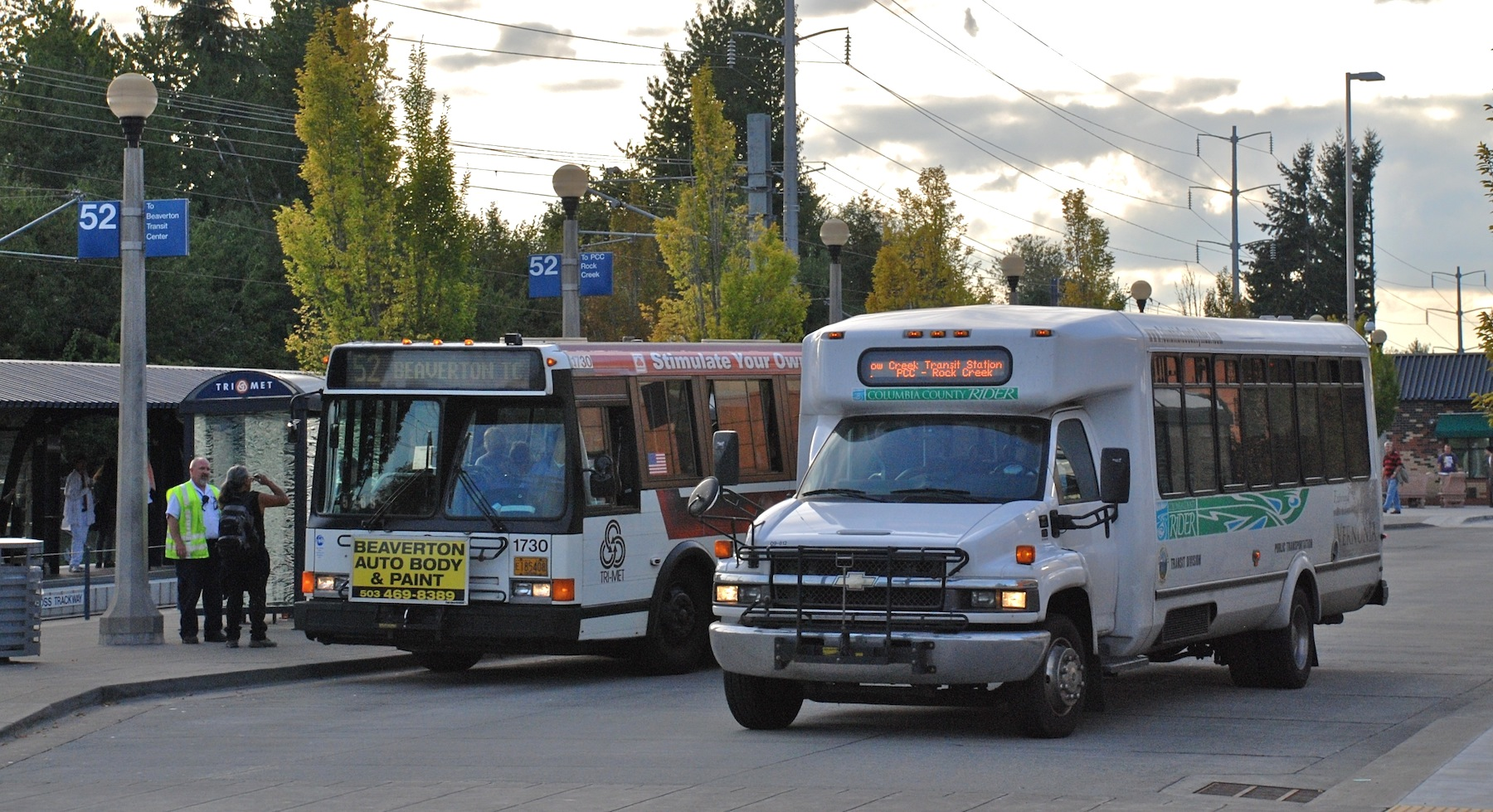
The CC Rider transit service links the county to Portland and points in Washington County, including connecting with TriMet buses and the MAX light rail system in eastern Hillsboro.

=== Public transit ===
Columbia County Rider (CC Rider), a service of the Columbia County Transit Division, provides six intercity bus lines and one "flex route" serving various points of downtown St. Helens and downtown Scappoose. From 2016 to 2022, CC Rider buses were operated by contract drivers supplied by MTR Western, a charter motor coach operator, but since July 2022 the county has operated the service directly.

The transit service is largely funded by grants from the Oregon Department of Transportation and the federal government. Attempts at making CC Rider a separate transit district and to introduce new taxes to fund it have repeatedly failed since 2015. Columbia County and nearby Clatsop County are currently studying options on consolidating the two county's transit services.

Single-ride fares range from $2 to $6 per ride, depending on number of zones traveled. A ride to Astoria costs up to $10 per ride each way.

=== Major highways ===
- US 26
- US 30
- US 30 Bus.
- OR 47
- OR 202

== Education ==
School districts include:

- Clatskanie School District 6J
- Rainier School District 13
- Scappoose School District 1J
- St. Helens School District 502
- Vernonia School District 47J

Most of Columbia County is in the boundary of Portland Community College, while a portion to the north is not in the boundary of any community college district.

== See also ==
- National Register of Historic Places listings in Columbia County, Oregon
