= National Register of Historic Places listings in Clatsop County, Oregon =

Location of Clatsop County in Oregon

This list presents the full set of buildings, structures, objects, sites, or districts designated on the National Register of Historic Places in Clatsop County, Oregon, United States, and offers brief descriptive information about each of them. The National Register recognizes places of national, state, or local historic significance across the United States. Out of over 90,000 National Register sites nationwide, Oregon is home to over 2,000, and 62 of those are found in Clatsop County.

This National Park Service list is complete through NPS recent listings posted September 25, 2026.

== Current listings ==
	Name on the Register	Image	Date listed	Location	City or town	Description
1	Astor Building	Astor Building	September 7, 1984 (#84002938)	1203 Commercial St. 46°11′19″N 123°49′48″W	Astoria	Opened in 1925 amid reconstruction after Astoria's fire of 1922, this theater and commercial building symbolized the city's rebirth. Its Italian Renaissance style was unique in Astoria, and the auditorium features a set of 12 mural-style paintings depicting Venetian canal scenes by local artist Joseph Knowles.
2	John Jacob Astor Hotel	John Jacob Astor Hotel	November 16, 1979 (#79002046)	1401 Commercial St. 46°11′19″N 123°49′42″W	Astoria	Opened in 1924 and was originally named the Hotel Astoria; renamed in 1951 and closed as a hotel in 1968. Now in use as an apartment building.
3	Astoria City Hall	Astoria City Hall	September 7, 1984 (#84002940)	1618 Exchange St. 46°11′18″N 123°49′31″W	Astoria	Served as city hall of Astoria from 1905 to 1939.
4	Astoria Column	Astoria Column	May 2, 1974 (#74001681)	Coxcomb Hill; 46°10′53″N 123°49′03″W	Astoria	
5	Astoria Downtown Historic District	Astoria Downtown Historic District	June 22, 1998 (#98000631)	Boundary roughly from the Columbia R. to Exchange St and from 7th St. to 17th St. 46°11′20″N 123°49′51″W	Astoria	
6	Astoria Elks Building	Astoria Elks Building	June 1, 1990 (#90000843)	453 11th St. 46°11′16″N 123°49′55″W	Astoria	
7	Astoria Fire House No. 2	Astoria Fire House No. 2	September 7, 1984 (#84002946)	2968 Marine Dr. 46°11′26″N 123°48′40″W	Astoria	
8	Astoria Marine Construction Company Historic District	Astoria Marine Construction Company Historic District	January 8, 2014 (#13001058)	92134 Front Rd. 46°08′41″N 123°51′45″W	Astoria vicinity	
9	Astoria Victory Monument	Astoria Victory Monument	November 15, 1984 (#84000466)	Columbia St., Bond and W. Marine Dr. 46°11′23″N 123°50′53″W	Astoria	
10	Astoria Wharf and Warehouse Company	Astoria Wharf and Warehouse Company	June 14, 1984 (#84002949)	Columbia River waterfront between 3rd and 4th Sts. 46°11′29″N 123°50′20″W	Astoria	
11	Bald Point Site (35CLT23)		September 10, 1997 (#97000983)	Address restricted (Note: Federal and state laws and practices restrict general public access to information regarding the specific location of this resource. In some cases, this is to protect archaeological sites from vandalism, while in other cases it is restricted at the request of the owner.)	Cannon Beach vicinity	This archaeological site associated with the Tillamook people features a shell midden and possible house pit, dating to ca. 1550 CE. Parts of the site have been lost to coastal erosion, but the remaining portions appear mostly secure.
12	Robert Rensselaer Bartlett House	Robert Rensselaer Bartlett House	June 5, 1986 (#86001236)	1215 15th St. 46°10′59″N 123°49′36″W	Astoria	
13	Cahill-Nordstrom Farm	Cahill-Nordstrom Farm	October 16, 2023 (#100008331)	85926 Cahill Rd. 45°59′15″N 123°23′05″W	Clatskanie	
14	Peter L. Cherry House	Peter L. Cherry House	September 7, 1984 (#84002952)	836 15th St. 46°11′08″N 123°49′35″W	Astoria	
15	Clatsop County Courthouse	Clatsop County Courthouse	April 5, 1984 (#84002954)	749 Commercial St. 46°11′20″N 123°50′07″W	Astoria	
16	Clatsop County Jail (Old)	Clatsop County Jail (Old)	May 19, 1983 (#83002145)	732 Duane St. 46°11′19″N 123°50′08″W	Astoria	
17	Ecola Point Site (35CLT21)		September 10, 1997 (#97000984)	Address restricted	Cannon Beach vicinity	Remains of a Tillamook village and two dense shell middens at this archaeological site have been dated to span roughly 1100–1700 CE. This large and complex site is mostly intact, and has extensive potential to yield information for future research.
18	Erickson–Larsen Ensemble	Erickson–Larsen Ensemble	February 20, 1991 (#91000055)	3025–3027 Marine Dr. 46°11′26″N 123°48′37″W	Astoria	Consists of two buildings: a house built in 1877 and a small apartment building (the Ludwig Larsen apartments) built c. 1885.
19	Albert W. Ferguson House	Albert W. Ferguson House	September 7, 1984 (#84002955)	1661 Grand Ave. 46°11′09″N 123°49′29″W	Astoria	
20	Ferdinand Fisher House	Ferdinand Fisher House	May 6, 1987 (#87000668)	687 12th St. 46°11′11″N 123°49′50″W	Astoria	
21	Capt. George Flavel House and Carriage House	Capt. George Flavel House and Carriage House	November 28, 1980 (#80003307)	441 8th St. 46°11′17″N 123°50′06″W	Astoria	Queen Anne style house, built in 1885, now a house museum. Featured in The Goonies.
22	Captain George Conrad Flavel House	Captain George Conrad Flavel House	June 5, 1986 (#86001222)	627 15th St. 46°11′12″N 123°49′39″W	Astoria	House built in 1901.
23	George C. and Winona Flavel House	George C. and Winona Flavel House	February 19, 1991 (#91000054)	818 Grand Ave. 46°11′11″N 123°50′04″W	Astoria	House built in 1879.
24	Martin Foard House	Martin Foard House	June 5, 1986 (#86001221)	690 17th St. 46°11′11″N 123°49′26″W	Astoria	
25	Fort Astoria	Fort Astoria	October 15, 1966 (#66000639)	15th and Exchange Sts. 46°11′18″N 123°49′39″W	Astoria	John Jacob Astor attempted to break the British monopoly on the Pacific Northwest fur trade starting with construction of this fortified trading post in 1811. The fort subsequently became an important part of the American territorial claim to the Oregon Country. Astor sold the fort to the British North West Company in 1813.
26	Fort Clatsop National Memorial	Fort Clatsop National Memorial	October 15, 1966 (#66000640)	4.5 miles (7.2 km) south of Astoria; 46°08′03″N 123°52′45″W	Astoria vicinity	
27	Fort Stevens	Fort Stevens	September 22, 1971 (#71000678)	Fort Stevens State Park; 46°12′03″N 123°57′48″W	Hammond	
28	William and Nellie Fullam House	William and Nellie Fullam House	October 25, 1991 (#91001570)	781 S. Promenade; 45°59′22″N 123°55′50″W	Seaside	
29	Rev. William S. Gilbert House	Rev. William S. Gilbert House	June 3, 1993 (#93000457)	725 11th St. 46°11′10″N 123°49′55″W	Astoria	
30	Goodwin–Wilkinson Farmhouse	Goodwin–Wilkinson Farmhouse	March 9, 1992 (#92000128)	US-101 west of Cullaby Lake; 46°05′13″N 123°55′00″W	Warrenton vicinity	
31	Grace Episcopal Church and Rectory (Note: The rectory included in the "Grace Episcopal Church and Rectory" listing and the "Grace Episcopal Church Rectory, Old" are separate and distinct buildings. The "Grace Episcopal Church Rectory, Old" is not included in the "Grace Episcopal Church and Rectory" listing.)	Grace Episcopal Church and Rectory	September 7, 1984 (#84002957)	1545 Franklin Ave. 46°11′13″N 123°49′35″W	Astoria	
32	Grace Episcopal Church Rectory, Old	Grace Episcopal Church Rectory, Old	March 9, 1990 (#90000375)	637 16th St. 46°11′12″N 123°49′33″W	Astoria	
33	Capt. J. H. D. Gray House	Capt. J. H. D. Gray House	September 7, 1984 (#84002958)	1687 Grand Ave. 46°11′09″N 123°49′28″W	Astoria	
34	John N. Griffin House	John N. Griffin House	October 25, 1984 (#84000119)	1643 Grand Ave. 46°11′09″N 123°49′29″W	Astoria	
35	Haller–Black House	Haller–Black House	October 25, 1991 (#91001568)	841 S. Promenade; 45°59′21″N 123°55′51″W	Seaside	
36	Hlilusqahih Site (35CLT37)		April 26, 1984 (#84002959)	Address restricted	Knappa	
37	John Hobson House	John Hobson House	February 17, 1978 (#78002281)	469 Bond St. 46°11′23″N 123°50′17″W	Astoria	
38	Gustavus Holmes House	Gustavus Holmes House	October 25, 1984 (#84000121)	682 34th St. 46°11′26″N 123°48′20″W	Astoria	
39	Indian Creek Village Site (35CLT12)		September 10, 1997 (#97000982)	Address restricted	Cannon Beach vicinity	
40	Indian Point Site (35 CLT 34)		May 9, 1984 (#84002960)	Address restricted	Svensen	
41	Isabella Shipwreck Site and Remains		September 21, 1989 (#89001385)	Address restricted	Astoria vicinity	
42	Peter and Maria Larson House	Peter and Maria Larson House	March 9, 1990 (#90000374)	611 31st St. 46°11′27″N 123°48′34″W	Astoria	
43	Charles David Latourette House	Charles David Latourette House	March 22, 1984 (#84002962)	683 D St. 46°01′16″N 123°55′08″W	Gearhart	
44	Christian Leinenweber House	Christian Leinenweber House	May 20, 1999 (#99000604)	3480 Franklin Ave. 46°11′30″N 123°48′17″W	Astoria	
45	Lightship WAL-604, COLUMBIA	Lightship WAL-604, COLUMBIA	February 17, 1978 (#89002463)	1792 Maritime Dr. 46°11′25″N 123°49′26″W	Astoria	Retired in 1979 as the last lightship to be stationed at the Columbia River Bar — or anywhere on the Pacific coast of the United States — WAL-604 retains the best historic integrity of the last generation of U.S. Coast Guard lightships after 1939. WAL-604, built in 1950, and its relatives closely resembled earlier lightship types in external appearance, but were a distinct departure in their overall design.
46	Noonan–Norblad House	Noonan–Norblad House	March 31, 1988 (#88000303)	1625 Grand Ave. 46°11′09″N 123°49′30″W	Astoria	
47	Judge C. H. Page House	Judge C. H. Page House	June 6, 1985 (#85001177)	1393 Franklin Ave. 46°11′12″N 123°49′43″W	Astoria	
48	Charles Preston House	Charles Preston House	October 25, 1991 (#91001569)	141 Ave. I 45°59′19″N 123°55′46″W	Seaside	
49	Sea Lyft	Sea Lyft	November 14, 2001 (#01000496)	702 D St. 46°01′17″N 123°55′07″W	Gearhart	
50	Shively–McClure Historic District	Shively–McClure Historic District	August 4, 2005 (#05000829)	From Franklin Ave. to Lexington Ave., and from 9th St. to 18th St. 46°11′09″N 123°49′37″W	Astoria	
51	Norris Staples House	Norris Staples House	October 25, 1984 (#84000126)	1031 14th St. 46°11′02″N 123°49′42″W	Astoria	
52	Charles Stevens House	Charles Stevens House	June 6, 1985 (#85001178)	1388 Franklin Ave. 46°11′14″N 123°49′43″W	Astoria	
53	Svenson Blacksmith Shop	Svenson Blacksmith Shop	November 6, 1986 (#86003015)	1769 Exchange St. 46°11′19″N 123°49′23″W	Astoria	
54	Tillamook Rock Lighthouse	Tillamook Rock Lighthouse	December 9, 1981 (#81000480)	SW of Seaside; 45°56′14″N 124°01′09″W	Seaside	
55	Union Fishermen's Cooperative Packing Company Alderbrook Station	Union Fishermen's Cooperative Packing Company Alderbrook Station	February 20, 1991 (#91000053)	4900 Ash St. 46°11′49″N 123°46′57″W	Astoria	
56	Uniontown–Alameda Historic District	Uniontown–Alameda Historic District	August 25, 1988 (#88001311)	Marine Dr. and Alameda Ave., between Hume and Hull Aves. 46°11′18″N 123°50′54″W	Astoria	
57	U.S. Post Office and Custom House	U.S. Post Office and Custom House	March 4, 1985 (#85000542)	750 Commercial St. 46°11′21″N 123°50′07″W	Astoria	
58	Warren Investment Company Housing Group	Warren Investment Company Housing Group	June 5, 1986 (#86001223)	656, 674, and 690 11th St. 46°11′11″N 123°49′54″W	Astoria	
59	Daniel Knight Warren House	Daniel Knight Warren House	September 8, 1988 (#88001521)	107 NE Skipanon Dr. 46°10′06″N 123°55′19″W	Warrenton	
60	Oswald West Coastal Retreat	Oswald West Coastal Retreat	February 26, 1992 (#92000066)	1981 Pacific Ave. 45°52′54″N 123°57′46″W	Cannon Beach	
61	Andrew Young House	Andrew Young House	June 26, 1986 (#86001391)	3720 Duane St. 46°11′34″N 123°48′03″W	Astoria	
62	Benjamin Young House and Carriage House	Benjamin Young House and Carriage House	March 7, 1979 (#79002047)	3652 Duane St. 46°11′34″N 123°48′08″W	Astoria	

== Former listings ==
	Name on the Register	Image	Date listed	Date removed	Location	City or town	Description
1	Samuel Elmore Cannery	Samuel Elmore Cannery	November 13, 1966 (#66000638)	July 16, 1993 (Note: Other sources offer conflicting dates for removal of the Elmore Cannery from the National Register, including October 12, 1993, and August 11, 1993.)	70 W. Marine Drive; 46°11′30″N 123°50′45″W	Astoria	The home of "Bumble Bee" tuna, this was the longest continuously-operated salmon cannery in the U.S., from construction in 1898 until closing in 1980, diversifying into tuna in the 1930s. The cannery was destroyed by fire on January 26, 1993.
2	Allan Herschell Two-Abreast Carousel		August 26, 1987 (#87001382)	May 27, 1998	300 Broadway	Seaside	Oregon Historic Wooden Carousels TR. Moved to California in 1991. Now in storage.
3	Marshall J. Kinney Cannery		June 30, 1989 (#89000515)	September 8, 1997	1 6th St.	Astoria	Destroyed in fire in December 2010

== See also ==
- National Register of Historic Places listings in Oregon
- Listings in neighboring counties: Columbia, Pacific, Tillamook, Wahkiakum
- List of National Historic Landmarks in Oregon
- Historic preservation
- History of Oregon
- Lists of Oregon-related topics
