= Daniel Knight Warren =

- Born: 12 March 1836; Bath, New York
- Died: 3 September 1903 (aged 67); Clatsop County, Oregon
- Occupation: Businessman
- Known for: Development of Warrenton, Oregon

Daniel Knight Warren (March 12, 1836 – September 3, 1903) was an American pioneer, politician, and entrepreneur. He was a native of New York.

== Early life ==
Warren was born in Bath, New York on March 12, 1836. He married Sarah E Eaton in 1863. He lived in Princeton, Illinois before moving to Oregon.

== Oregon ==
Warren was responsible for much of the early development of Warrenton, Oregon. In the early 1870s he had commissioned Chinese laborers to build a 2.5 mile dike that reclaimed a large tract of land. In 1876, Warren served as a senator in the Oregon legislative assembly representing Clatsop, Tillomok, and Columbia Counties. He also served in the Astoria City Council. In 1891 Warren laid out Warrenton, and was also responsible for the completion of its first schoolhouse.

== Death and legacy ==
Warren died in September 1903 and is buried alongside his wife, who died in 1922. There gravestones are located around 1,000 feet from the historical Daniel Knight Warren House. The city of Warrenton, Oregon is named for Warren.
