= Christian Leinenweber House =

Historic house in Oregon, United States

- U.S. National Register of Historic Places
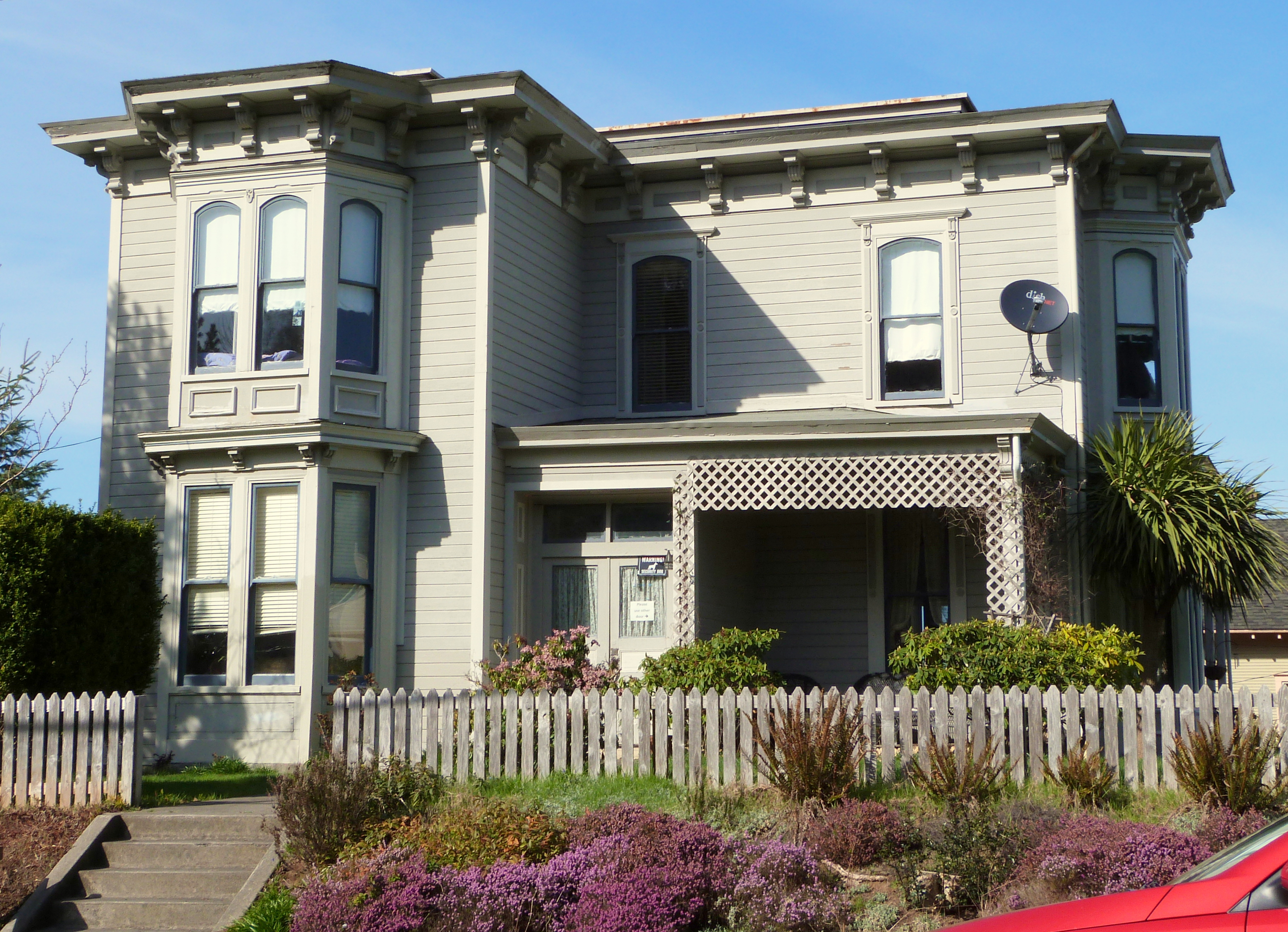
- The Leinenweber House in 2014

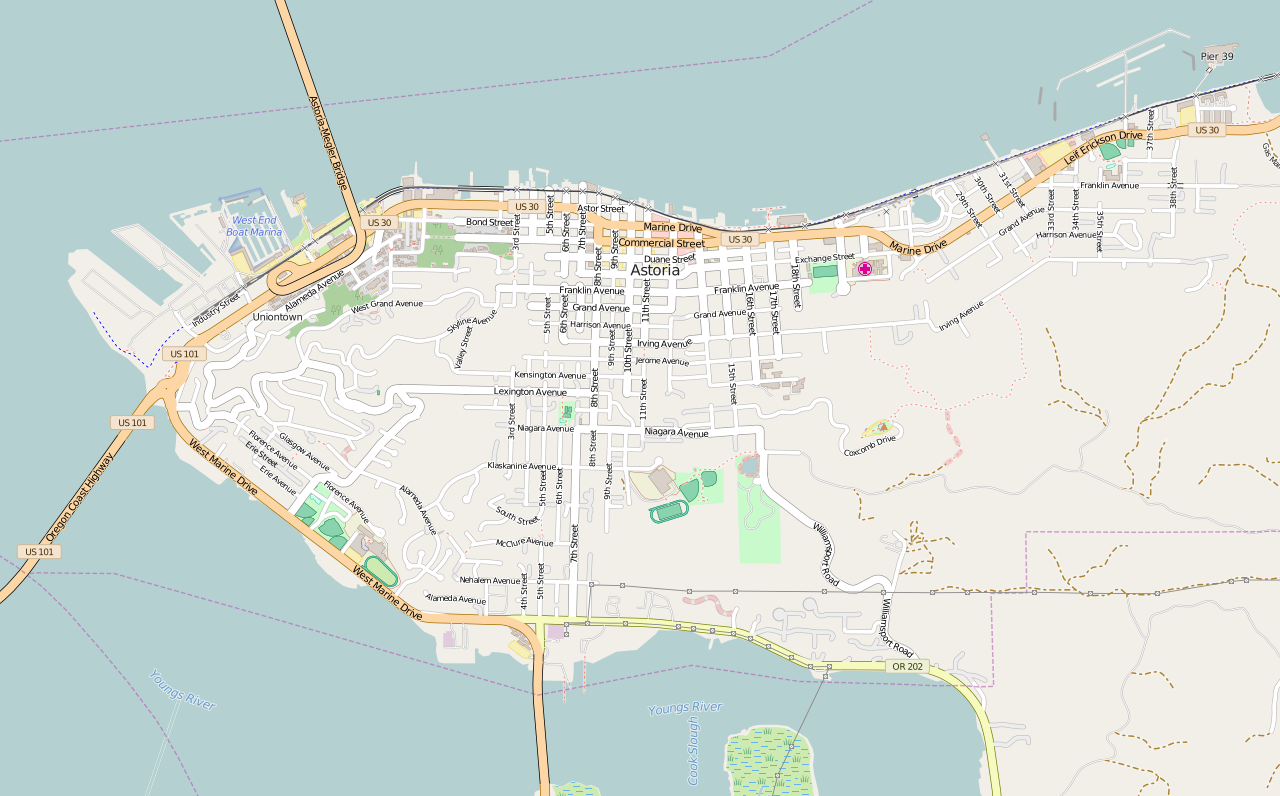
- Location within Astoria OR
- Location: 3480 Franklin Avenue; Astoria, Oregon
- Coordinates: 46°11′30″N 123°48′17″W
- Built: 1874
- Architectural style: Italianate
- NRHP reference No.: 99000604
- Added to NRHP: May 20, 1999

The Christian Leinenweber House is a house located in Astoria, Oregon, United States, listed on the National Register of Historic Places. It was built in 1874 by a local businessman named Christian Leinenweber. It is also known as the Otto Gramms House; Gramms and his family owned it from 1916 to 1965.

The house was built in 1874, but not originally in the Italianate architectural style for which it is known; rather, changes which placed it in this style came in 1883.

Christian Frederick Leinenweber was born in Pirmasens, Bavaria in February 1839. He settled in Astoria, Oregon in February 1866, and married Mary Powers the same year. Leinenweber influenced the growth of Astoria through his business dealings. Leinenweber was the first of five postmasters for the town of Upper Astoria. He served in the Oregon Legislature in 1884–1885, and died several years later in March 1889. At the time of his death, his estate included three partnership companies with Hiram Brown: Tillamock Packing, Nestucca Packing, and Badollet & Co. Leinenweber was also a school district manager at the time of his death.

== See also ==
- National Register of Historic Places listings in Clatsop County, Oregon
