= Captain George Conrad Flavel House =

Historic house in Oregon, United States

- U.S. National Register of Historic Places
- U.S. Historic district – Contributing property
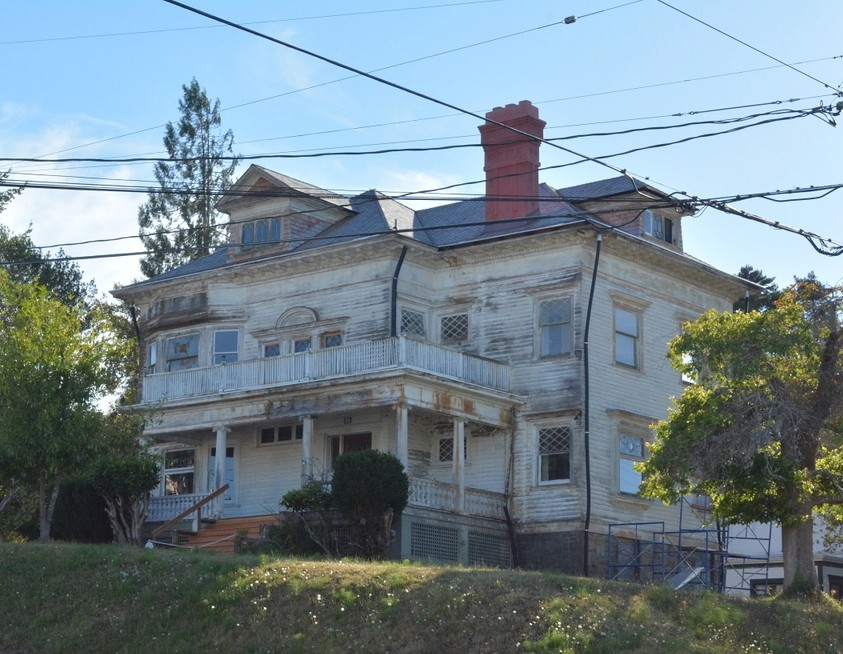
- The house in 2016

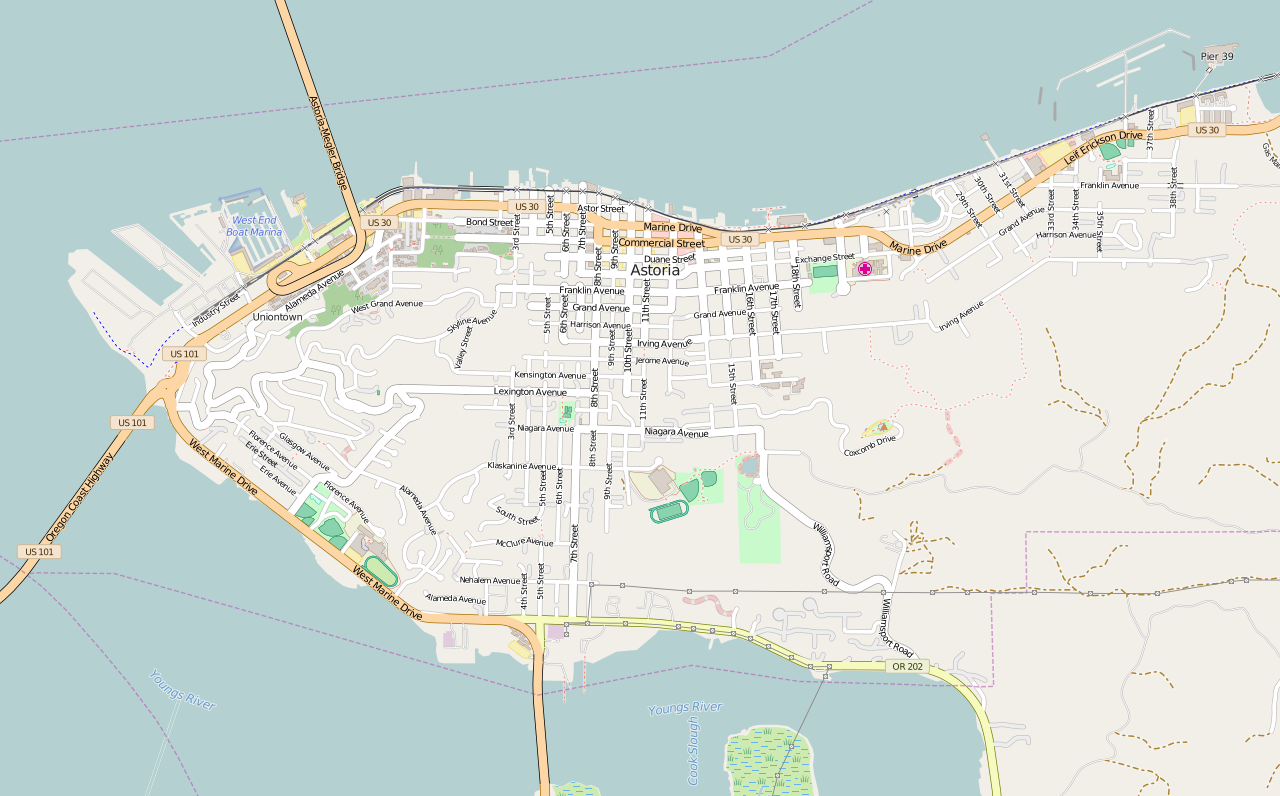
- Location within Astoria OR
- Location: 627 Fifteenth St., Astoria, Oregon
- Coordinates: 46°11′12″N 123°49′39″W
- Built: 1901
- Built by: Joseph W. Suprenant
- Architectural style: Colonial Revival, Queen Anne
- Part of: Shively–McClure Historic District (ID05000829)
- NRHP reference No.: 86001222
- Added to NRHP: June 5, 1986

The Captain George Conrad Flavel House is a house built in 1901 in Astoria, Oregon. It was listed on the National Register of Historic Places in 1986.

== History ==
The house was built by Joseph W. Suprenant, but the identity of the architect is unknown. The Colonial Revival-style house was the second residence of Captain George Conrad Flavel (1855–1923), his wife Winona and their son Harry, after they moved to it in 1901 from their first home, an 1879-built, smaller and more plain house that is also listed on the National Register, as the George C. and Winona Flavel House. George Conrad Flavel was the son of George Flavel (1824–1893), also a captain. George Conrad Flavel lived in the house until his death in 1923, and Winona Callendar Flavel (1861–1944) continued to reside there until her death in 1944. Harry M. Flavel (1886–1951 or 1886–1957) lived in this house as a child and then again from 1924 – after inheriting it from his father – until his death (in 1951 or 1957).

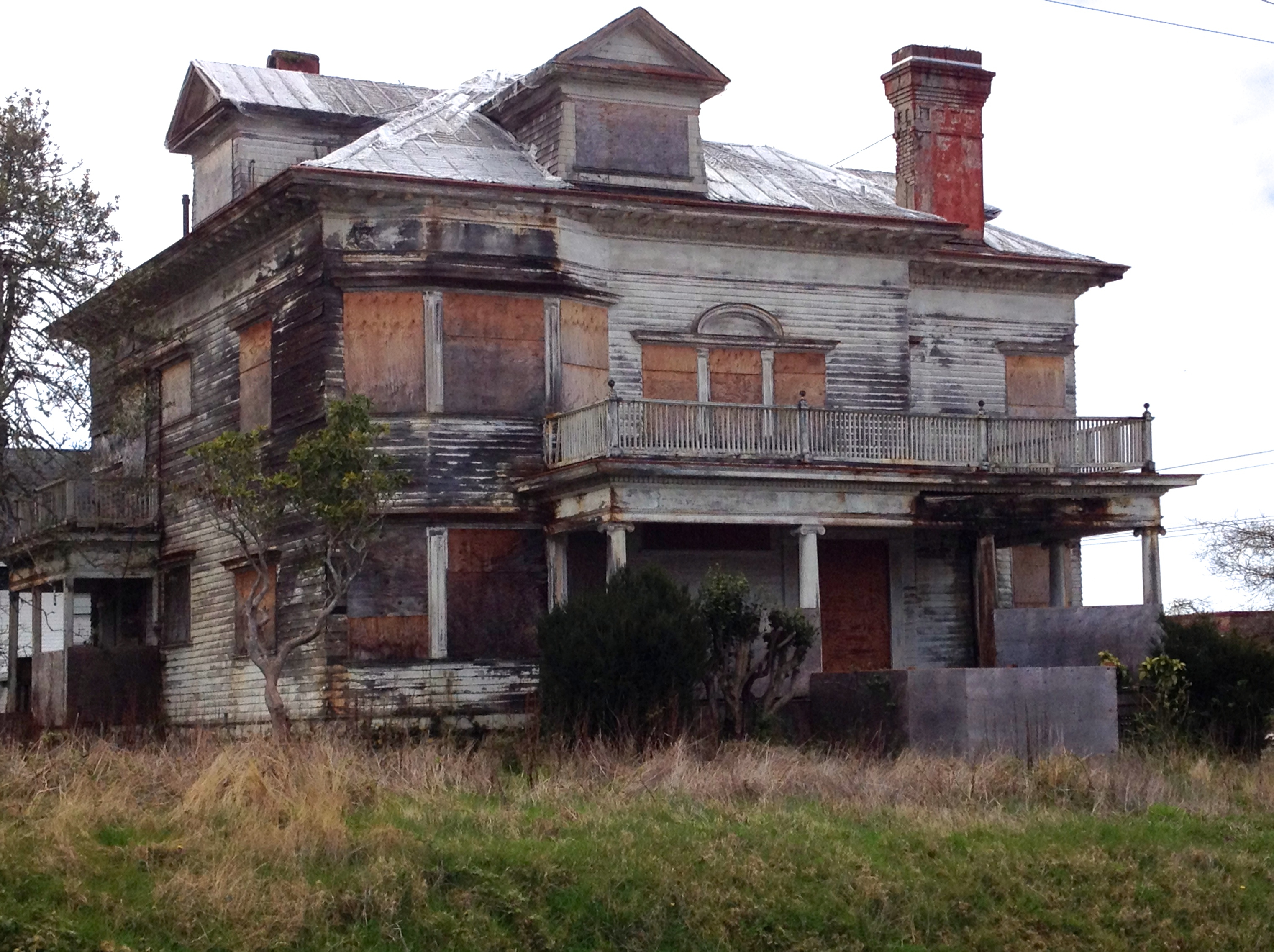
The house in 2014, boarded-up by the city under a derelict-buildings ordinance

After Harry Flavel's death, his wife, Florence (née Sherman) and their two children, Mary Louise and Harry S., were the only residents of the house.

On June 5, 1947, Harry S., at age 20, attacked a neighbor, Fred Fulton, with a hatchet at the family's cottage in Seaside. Fulton had been attempting to free Harry's mother Florence from the attic, in which Harry had locked her. The family became known as recluses in the community after the incident. Harry S. Flavel was indicted over the incident in June 1947, but was ultimately freed in December 1947.

In 1983, Harry S. was imprisoned after hitting a man's car with a chain one evening and then stabbing him. After serving seven years of his sentence, Harry S. was released from prison in 1990, and the Flavel family disappeared from the house shortly after. The home remained uninhabited and derelict for over twenty years until the city of Astoria took control of the property, acting under a derelict-buildings ordinance passed in 2011. The city then proceeded to board-up the house and carry out an inspection. Foreclosure proceedings followed in late 2013.

The house was sold in May 2015 to local Astoria businessman Greg Newenhof. Newenhof said that he planned to restore the house in order to move in and live at the property as his residence. When asked how long the restoration might take he replied, "Probably the rest of my life." Newenhof died unexpectedly in Astoria on January 28, 2018. It is unknown if his heirs will continue with the restoration.

== See also ==
- Capt. George Flavel House and Carriage House, 441 Eighth Street, Astoria, a house museum, also NRHP-listed
- George C. and Winona Flavel House, 818 Grand Ave., Astoria, also NRHP-listed
