= John Hobson House =

Historic house in Oregon, United States

- U.S. National Register of Historic Places
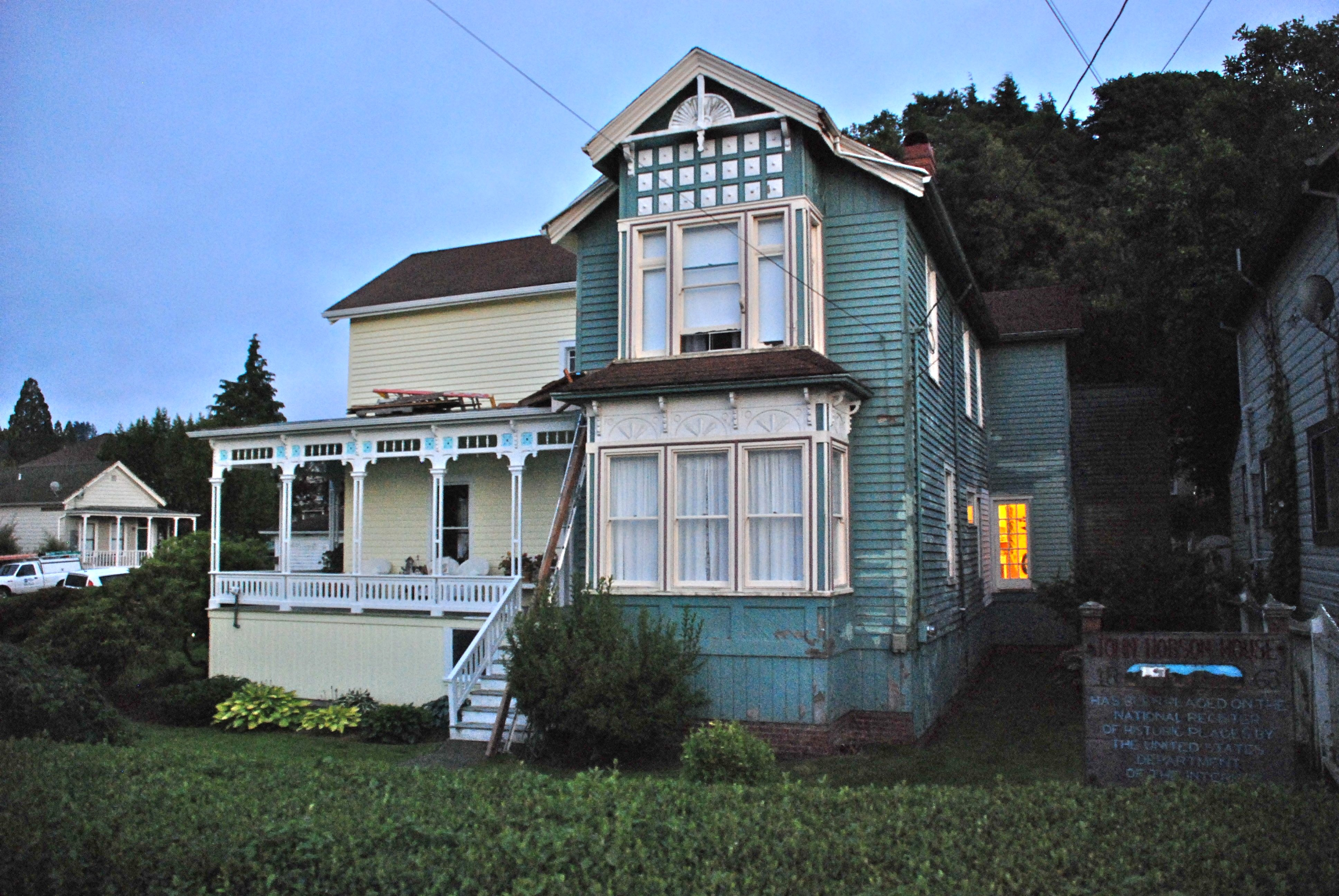
- The John Hobson House in 2012

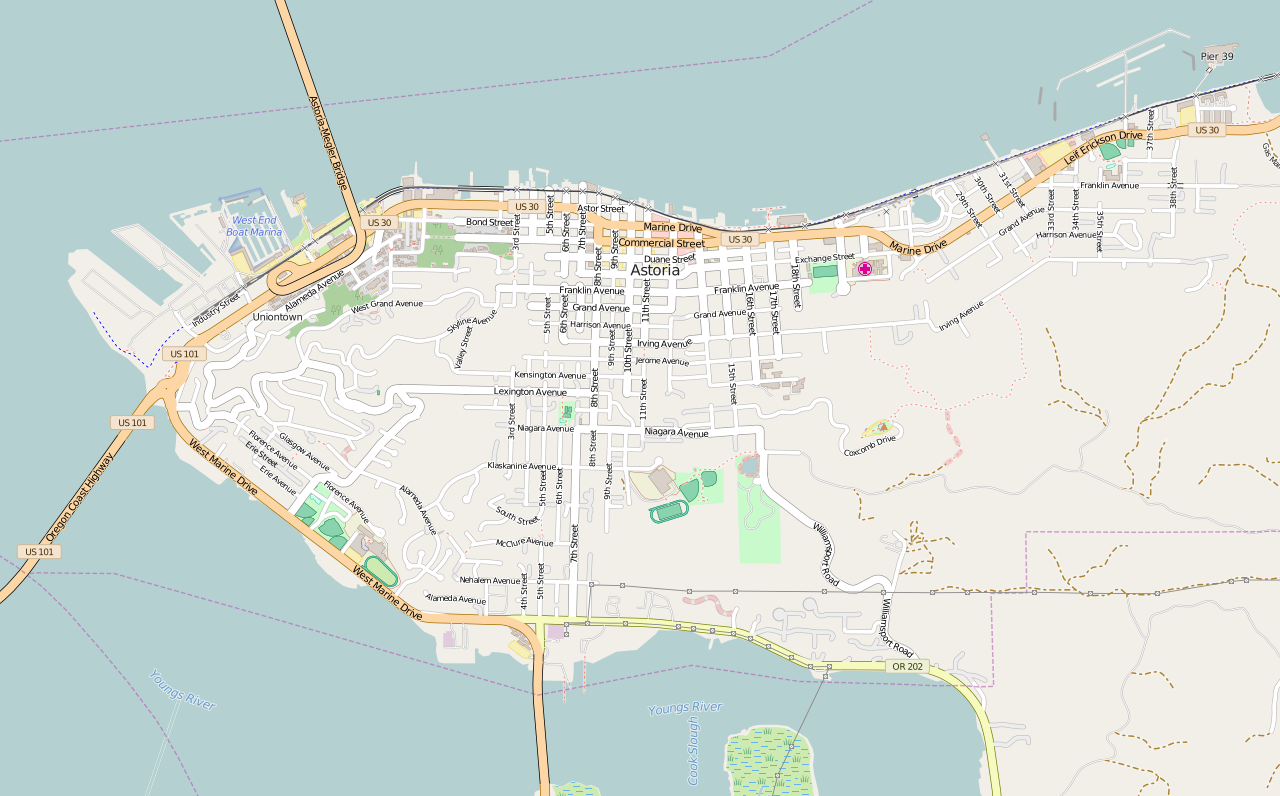
- Location within Astoria OR Location within Oregon Location within the United States
- Location: 469 Bond St., Astoria, Oregon
- Coordinates: 46°11′24″N 123°50′11″W
- Area: less than one acre
- Built: 1863
- Built by: John Hobson
- Architectural style: Stick/eastlake
- NRHP reference No.: 78002281
- Added to NRHP: February 17, 1978

The John Hobson House is a house located in Astoria, Oregon, listed on the National Register of Historic Places. It was built in 1863.

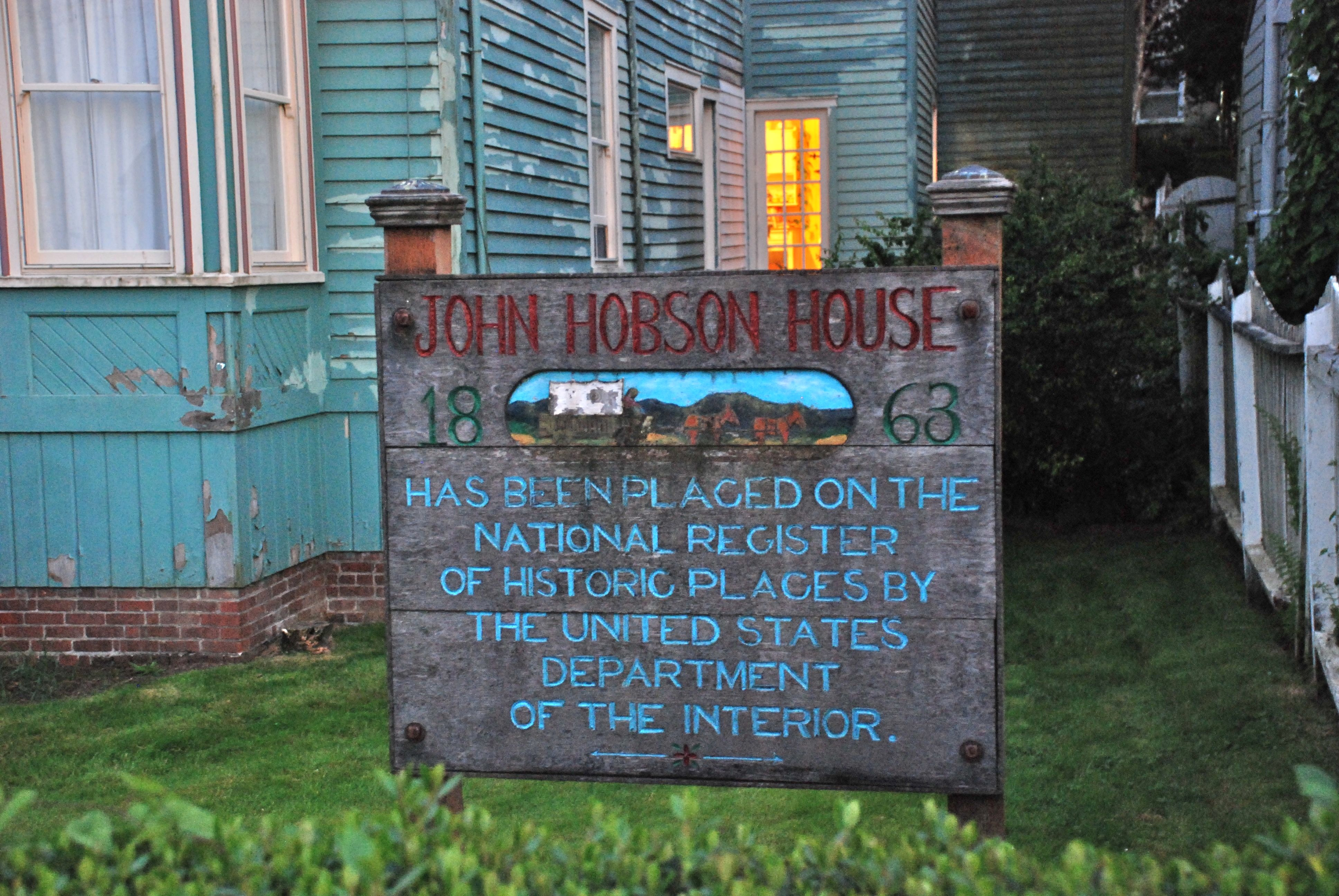
Sign in front of house

== See also ==
- National Register of Historic Places listings in Clatsop County, Oregon
