= Andrew Young House =

Historic house in Oregon, United States

- U.S. National Register of Historic Places
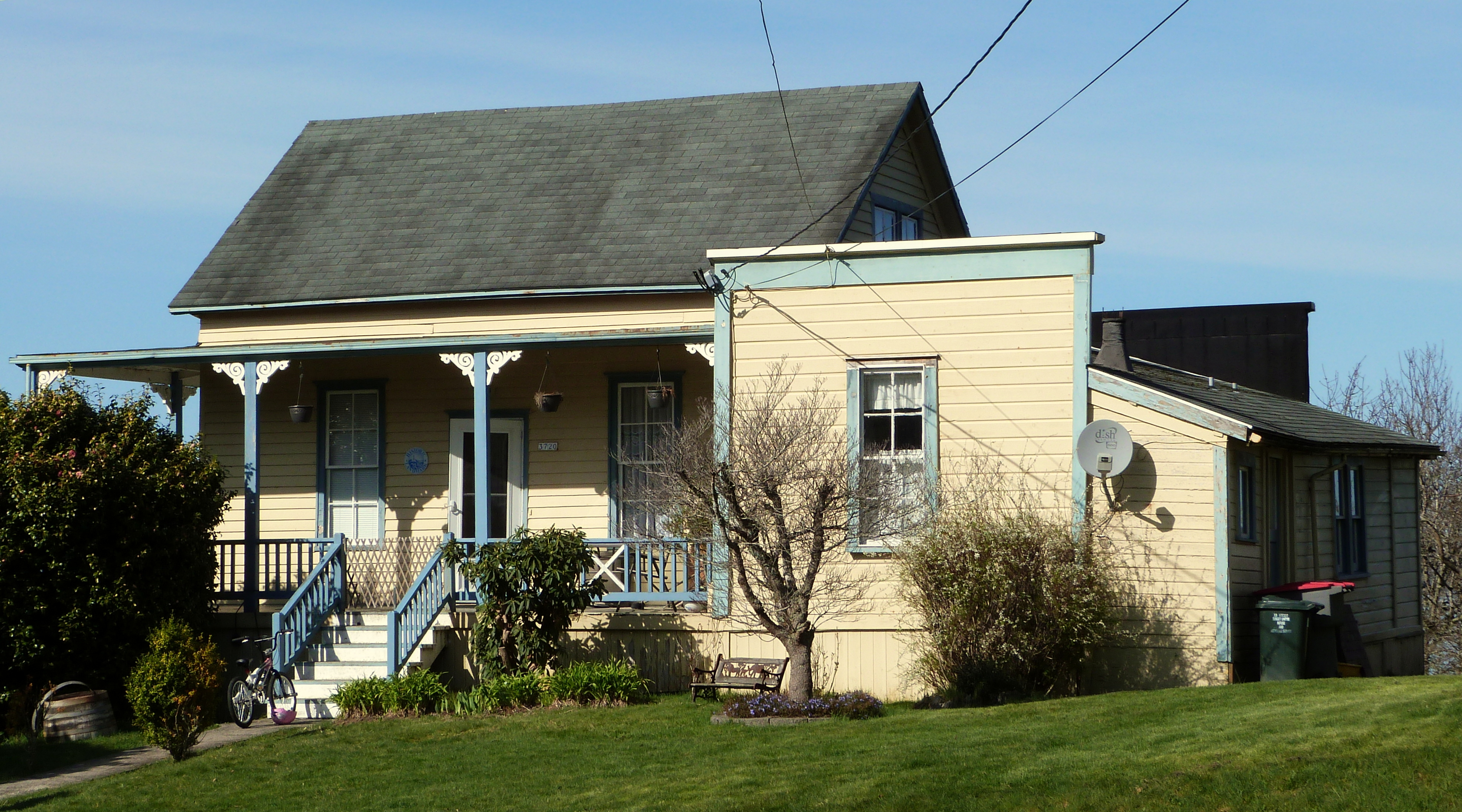
- The Andrew Young House in 2014

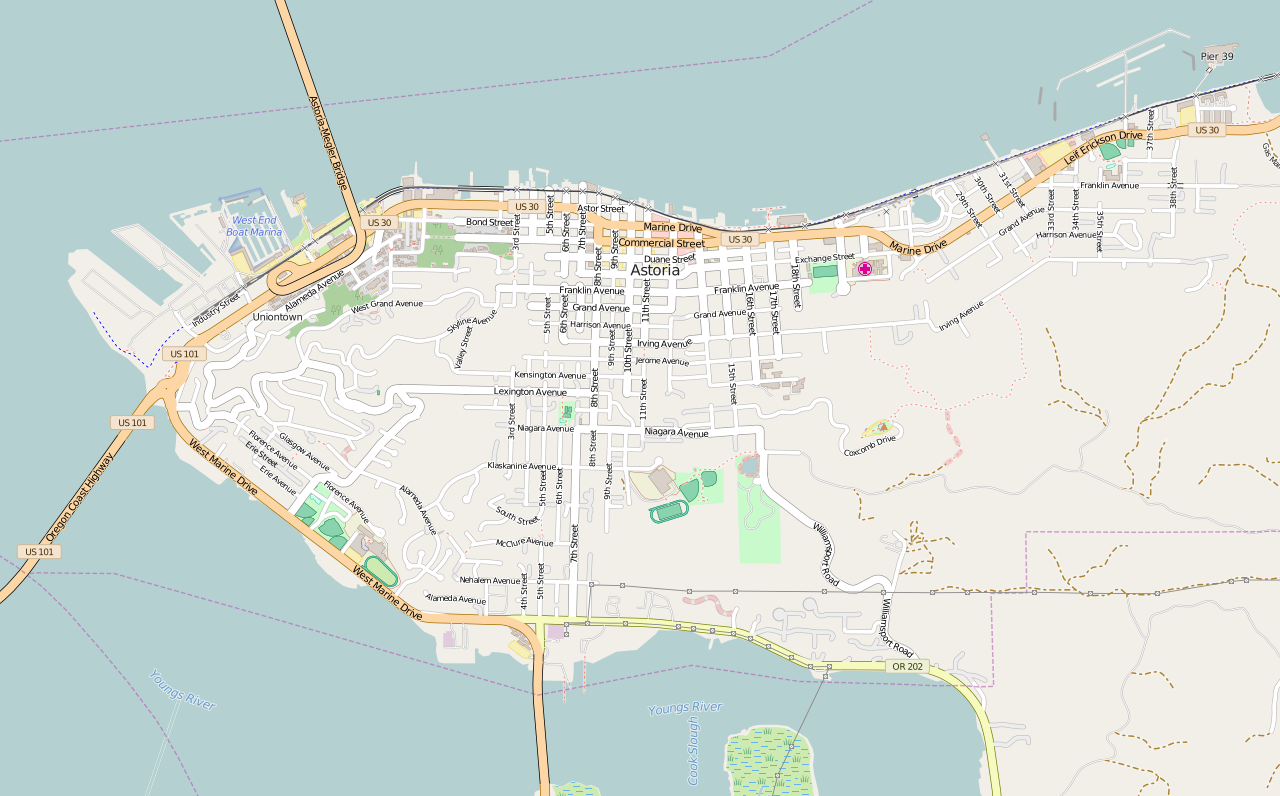
- Location within Astoria OR
- Location: 3720 Duane Street; Astoria, Oregon
- Coordinates: 46°11′34″N 123°48′03″W
- Area: Less than 1 acre (0.40 ha)
- Built: ca. 1875
- Architectural style: Vernacular Gothic Revival
- NRHP reference No.: 86001391
- Added to NRHP: June 26, 1986

The Andrew Young House is a historic house in Astoria, Oregon, United States. It was listed on the National Register of Historic Places in 1986.

== See also ==
- National Register of Historic Places listings in Clatsop County, Oregon
