= Astoria Wharf and Warehouse Company =

- U.S. National Register of Historic Places
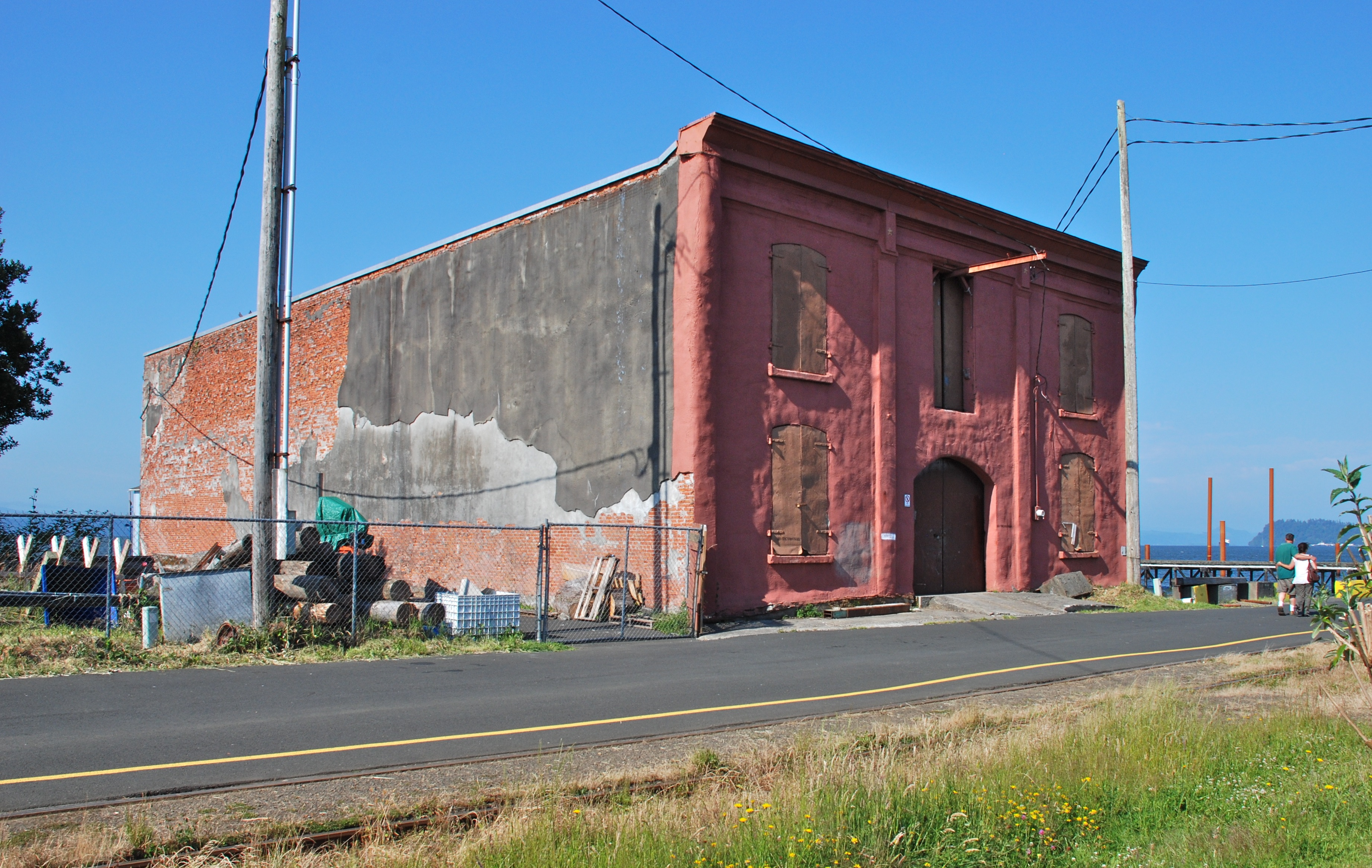
- The Astoria Wharf and Warehouse Company building in 2012

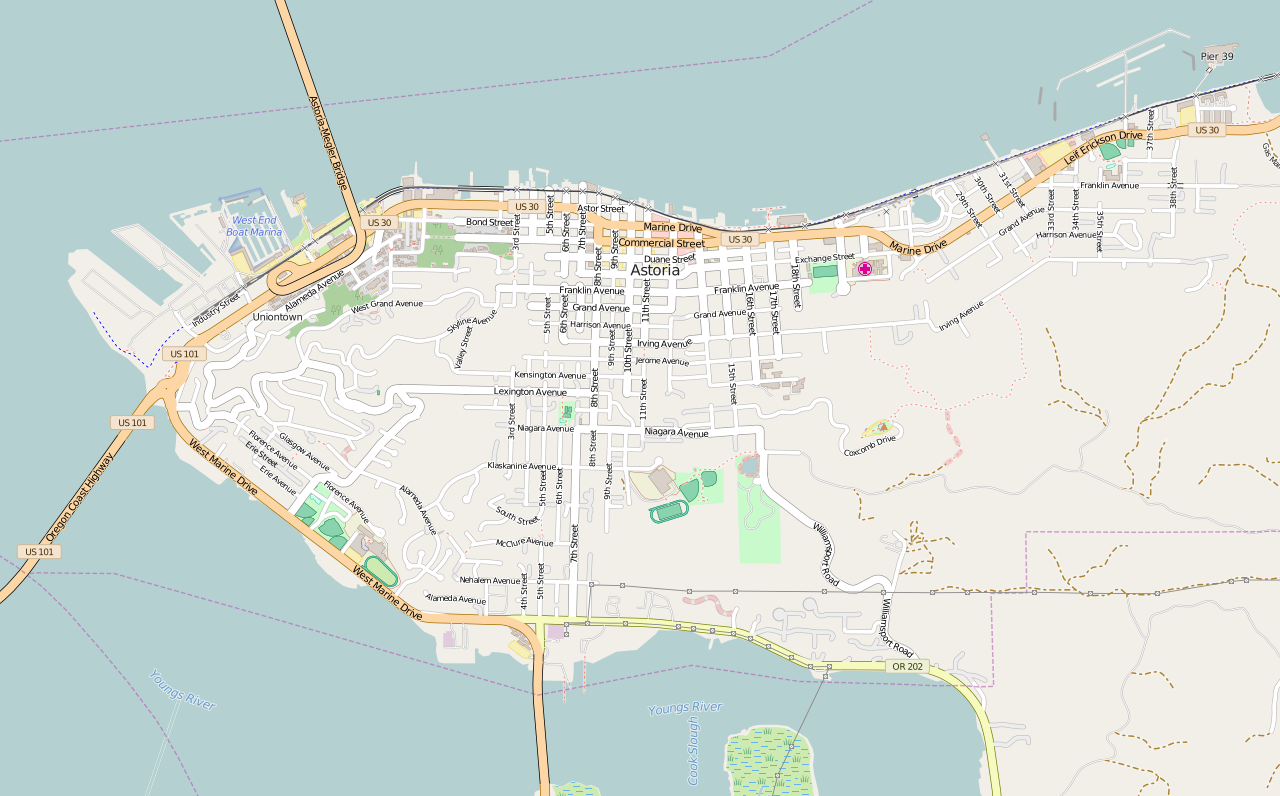
- Location within Astoria OR
- Location: Columbia River waterfront between 3rd & 4th streets Astoria, Oregon
- Coordinates: 46°11′29″N 123°50′20″W
- Area: 0.54 acres (0.22 ha)
- Built: 1892
- Built by: R. Carruthers
- NRHP reference No.: 84002949
- Added to NRHP: June 14, 1984

The Astoria Wharf and Warehouse Company building is a historic warehouse located in Astoria, Oregon, United States. The building was listed on the National Register of Historic Places in 1984.

Local businessman Steve Fick purchased the vacant building in 1989, but did not put it to use immediately. In the early 2020s, his company extensively renovated the building, for use as a distillery and restaurant, and in 2023 the Pacifick Distillery opened in the building.

== See also ==
- National Register of Historic Places listings in Clatsop County, Oregon
