= Isabella (1825 ship) =

History

United Kingdom
- Name: Isabella
- Operator: 1825: Gilmour & Richardson; 1829: Hudson's Bay Company
- Launched: 1825 at Shoreham, Sussex, England
- Fate: Wrecked 1830

General characteristics
- Tons burthen: 195 (bm)
- Length: 90 ft (27 m)
- Beam: 26 ft (7.9 m)
- Sail plan: Snow
- Complement: 15
- Notes: Single deck

Isabella was launched in 1825, at Shoreham. Initially, she traded with Gibraltar and Honduras. The Hudson's Bay Company (HBC) purchased her in 1829, and she was wrecked in 1830, on the Columbia River bar off Clatsop County, Oregon. The site of her remains are on the National Register of Historic Places in Clatsop County, Oregon as #89001385 placed on September 21, 1989. The remains are owned by the State of Oregon, Division of State Lands after being found in 1986. She is a wooden ship with copper sheathing.

== Career ==
Isabella first appeared in Lloyd's Register (LR) in 1827.

She was already trading by then. Lloyd's List reported in that Isabella, Cowle, master, had arrived at Omoa from Gibraltar. She was back at Gibraltar from Honduras on 14 July.

Year	Master	Owner	Trade	Source
1827	Cowl	Gilore & Co.	London–Gibraltar	LR
1828	R.Cowell	Gilmore & Co.	London–Gibraltar	LR
1829	R.Cowell; W.Ryan	Gilmore & Co.	London–Gibraltar	LR
1930	W.Ryan	Hudson's Bay Company	London-Colombia	LR

On 10 October 1829, the Hudson's Bay Company purchased Isabella for £2,900. The company purchased her to replace William and Ann, which had wrecked on the Columbia bar in May with the loss of all hands.

Isabella sailed from Blackwall on 30 October for the Columbia via the Sandwich Islands. On 3 May 1830, she wrecked on the Columbia bar. There was no loss of life; the crew arrived at Fort Vancouver. As it turned out, Isabella was stranded but had not sunk. The HBC factor at Fort Vancouver sent Ryan and his men to salvage what of her cargo and stores they could. They finally abandoned her on 24 May 1830. They reached Fort Vancouver again on 4 June. The news was published in England in April 1831.

== Post script ==
In 1986, researchers thought fisherman Daryl Hughes of Chinook had discovered the wreck of Isabella. It was later determined that the remains were those of the 1879 wreck SS Great Republic, not Isabella.
