= George C. and Winona Flavel House =

Historic house in Oregon, United States

- U.S. National Register of Historic Places
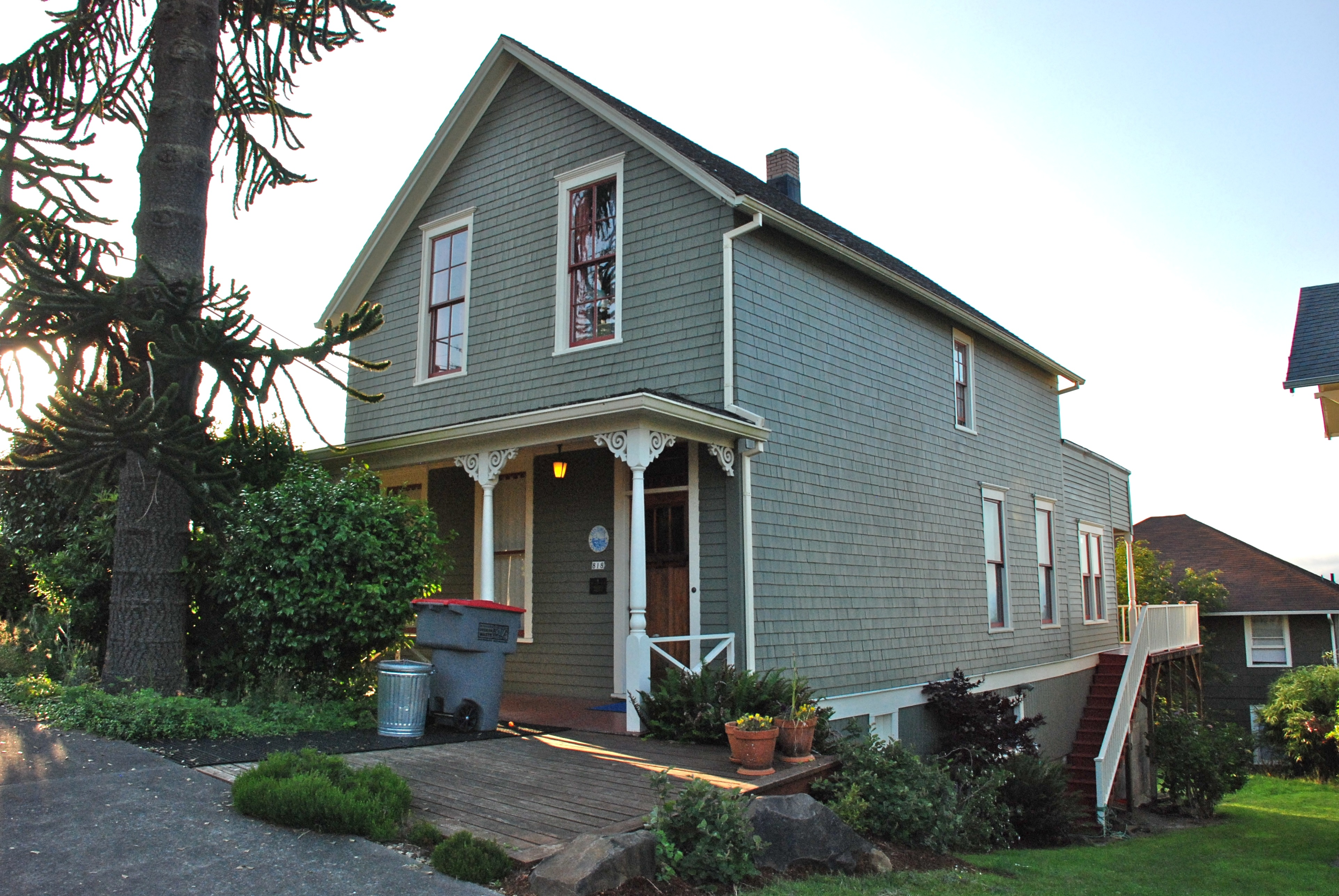

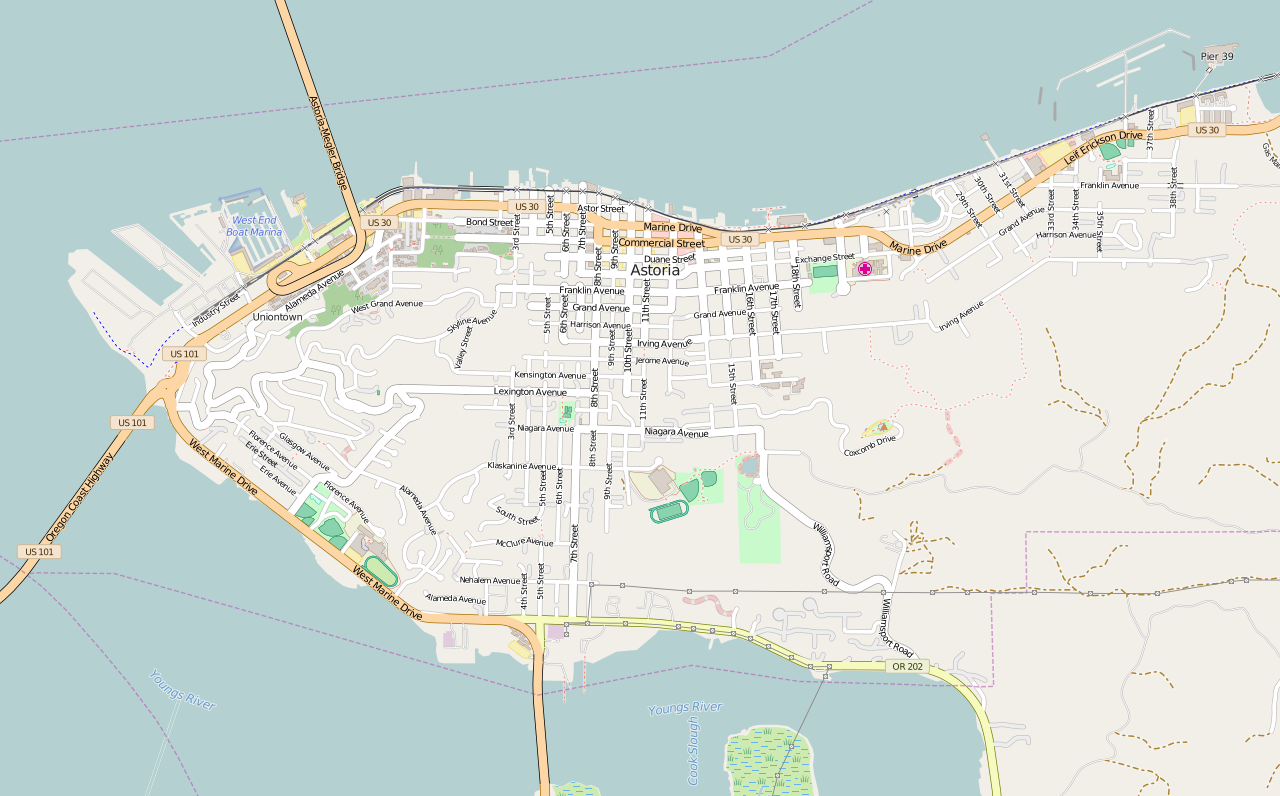
- Location within Astoria OR
- Location: 818 Grand Avenue; Astoria, Oregon
- Coordinates: 46°11′11″N 123°50′04″W
- Built: 1879
- Architectural style: Late Victorian, Gothic Revival, Vernacular Gothic Revival
- NRHP reference No.: 91000054
- Added to NRHP: February 19, 1991

The George C. and Winona Flavel House is a house built in 1879 in Astoria, Oregon. It was listed on the National Register of Historic Places in 1991.

This was the residence of Captain George Conrad Flavel (1855–1923) and his wife Winona from 1879 to 1901. George Conrad Flavel was the son of George Flavel (1824–1893), also a captain. The house was a wedding present to the junior Flavel from his grandfather, Conrad Boelling. George Conrad Flavel married C. Winona Callendar in 1879. An 1893 remodeling included expansion of the house. The couple lived in this house until 1901, at which time they moved to a newly built, larger house at 15th Street and Franklin Avenue (also in Astoria) and sold the 1879 dwelling. Their 1901-built house is also listed on the National Register, as the Captain George Conrad Flavel House.

== See also ==
- Capt. George Flavel House and Carriage House, 441 Eighth Street, Astoria, a house museum, also NRHP-listed
- Captain George Conrad Flavel House, 627 Fifteenth St., Astoria, also NRHP-listed
