= Peter and Maria Larson House =

Historic house in Oregon, United States

- U.S. National Register of Historic Places
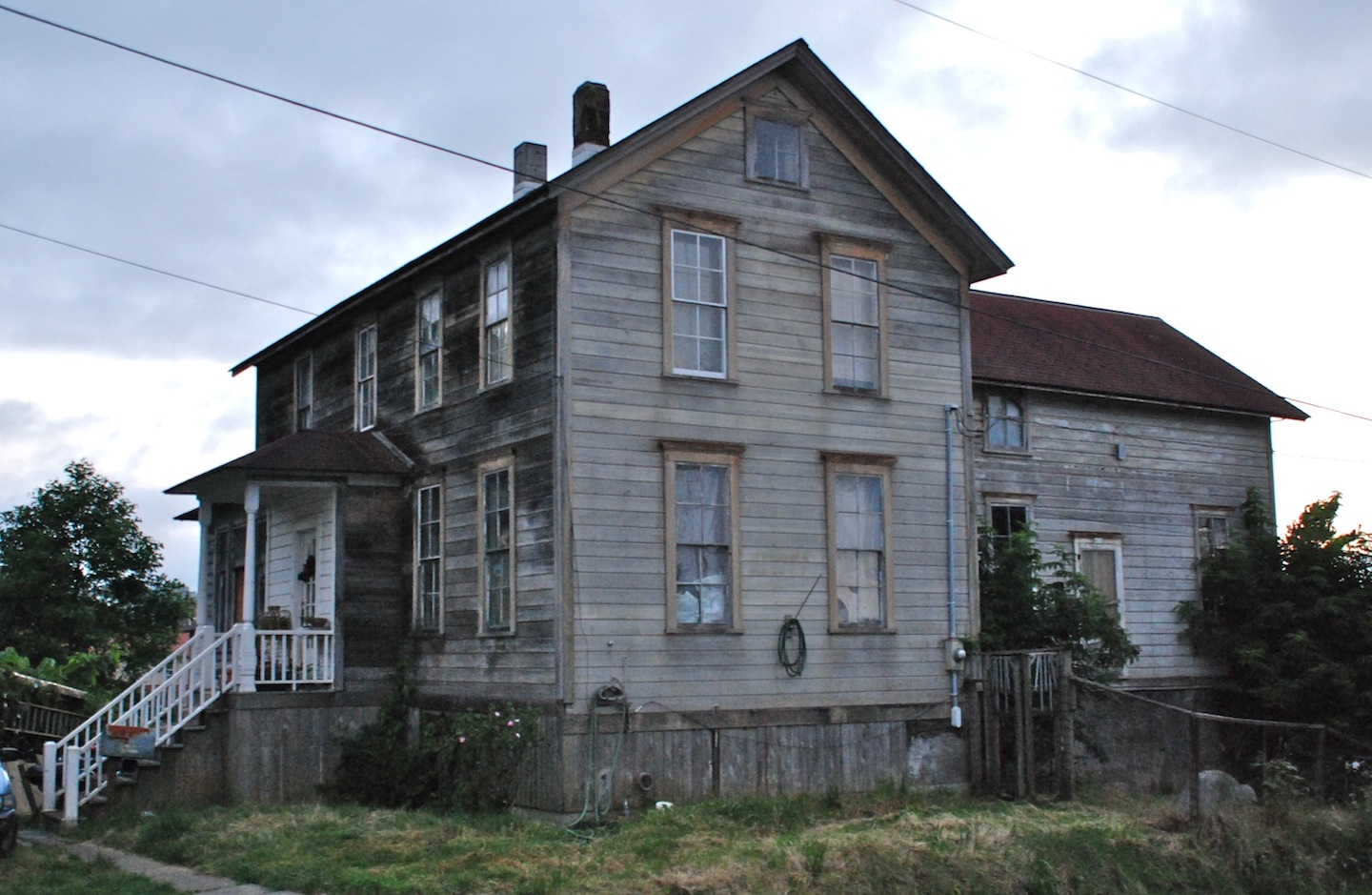
- The house's exterior in 2012

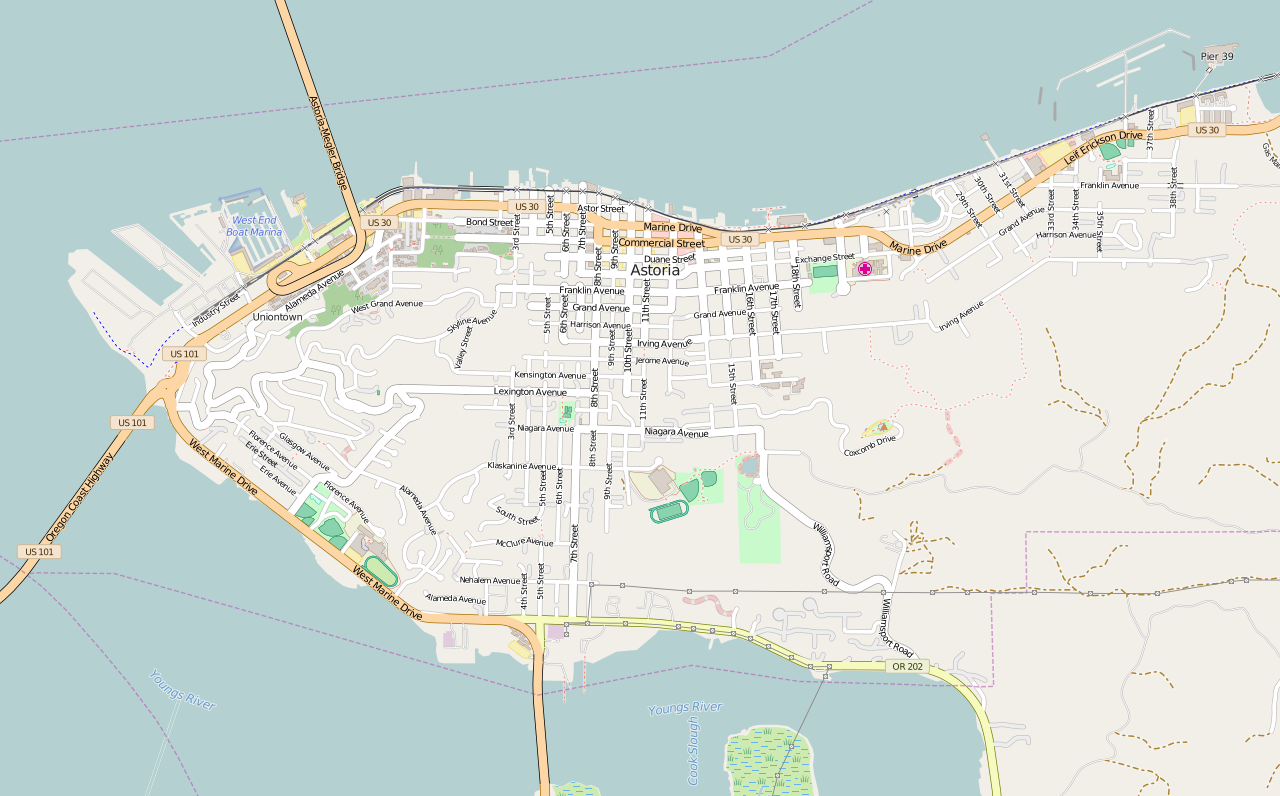
- Location within Astoria OR
- Location: 611 31st Street; Astoria, Oregon
- Coordinates: 46°11′27″N 123°48′34″W
- Area: 5,750 sq ft (534 m^{2})
- Built: c. 1884–1887
- Built by: Peter Larson
- Architectural style: Vernacular Gothic Revival
- NRHP reference No.: 90000374
- Added to NRHP: March 9, 1990

The Peter and Maria Larson House is a historic residence located in Astoria, Oregon, United States.

The house was listed on the National Register of Historic Places in 1990.

== See also ==
- National Register of Historic Places listings in Clatsop County, Oregon
