= Astoria Elks Building =

- U.S. National Register of Historic Places
- U.S. Historic district – Contributing property
- From the southeast in 2026

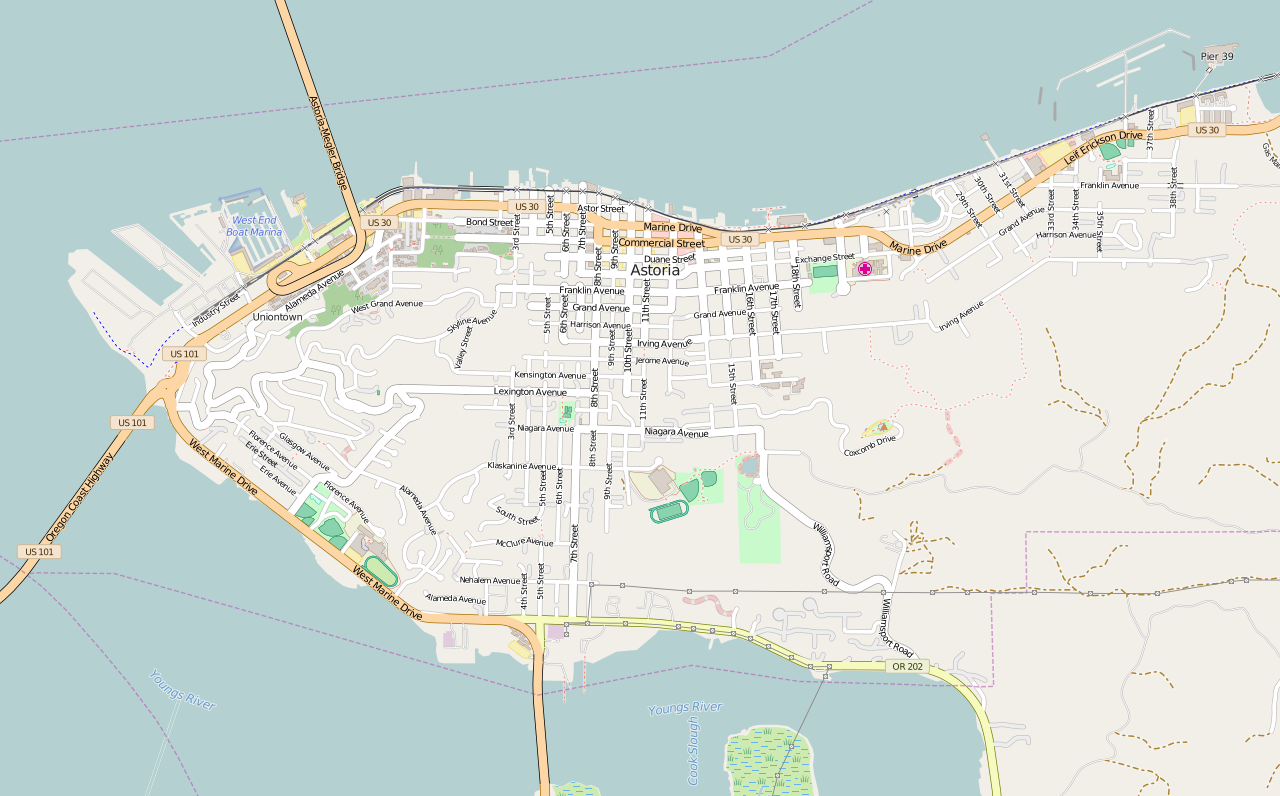
- Location within Astoria OR
- Location: 453 11th Street; Astoria, Oregon
- Coordinates: 46°11′16″N 123°49′55″W
- Area: 0.2 acres (0.081 ha)
- Built: 1923
- Architect: Charles T. Diamond
- Architectural style: Beaux Arts
- Part of: Astoria Downtown Historic District (ID98000631)
- NRHP reference No.: 90000843
- Added to NRHP: June 1, 1990

The Astoria Elks Building, also known as Astoria B.P.O.E. Lodge No. 180 Building, is an Elks building in Astoria, Oregon, that is listed on the National Register of Historic Places. It was built in 1923 and has a Beaux Arts architectural style. It was listed on the National Register in 1990.

It was completed in 1923. It has an "American Renaissance motif". Two sides have a "variegated brick veneer, broken into bays with pilasters and topped by terra cotta and crimped wrought iron." Its lower floor was designed for commercial use, and the upper floors reserved for use by the Elks lodge.

== See also ==
- National Register of Historic Places listings in Clatsop County, Oregon
