= Gustavus Holmes House =

Historic house in Oregon, United States

- U.S. National Register of Historic Places
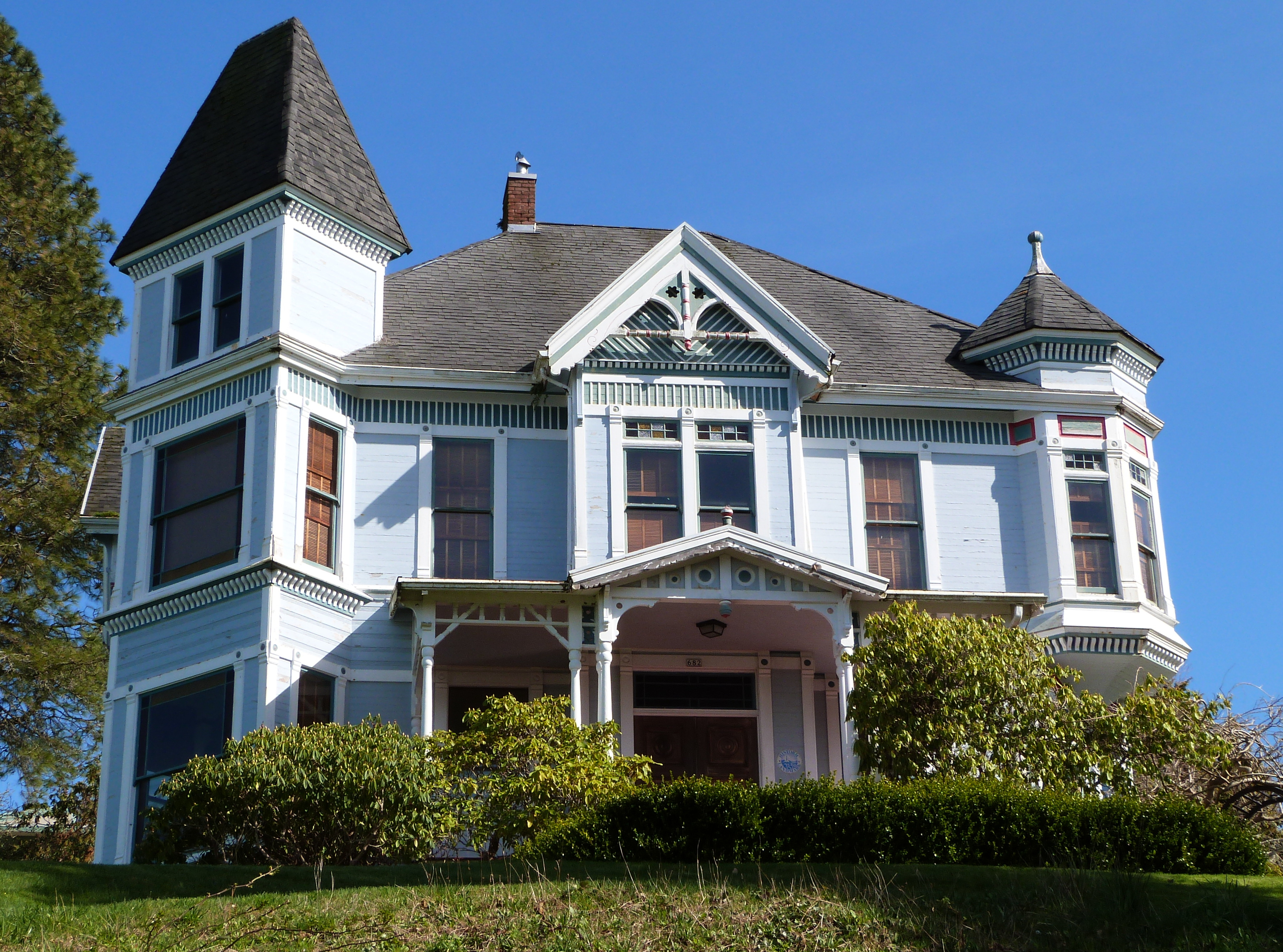
- The Holmes House in 2014

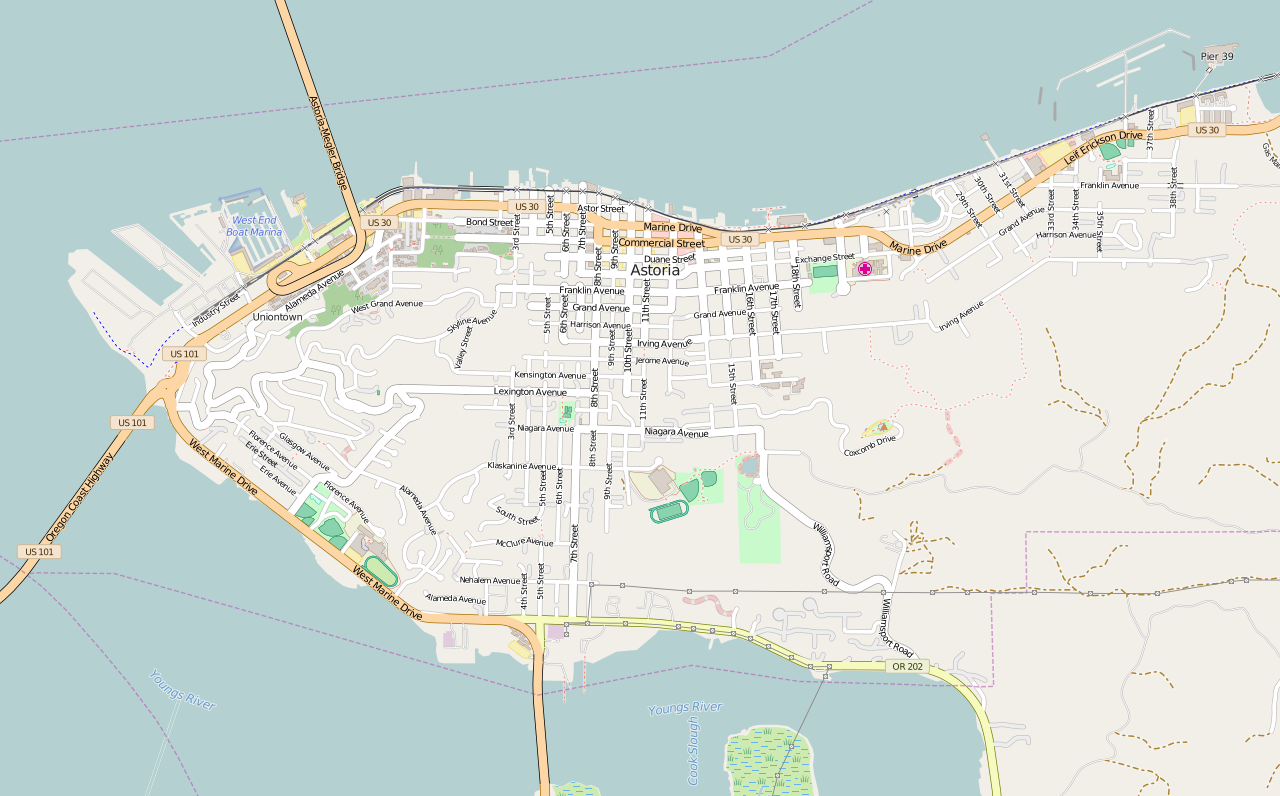
- Location within Astoria OR
- Location: 682 34th Street; Astoria, Oregon
- Coordinates: 46°11′26″N 123°48′20″W
- Area: Less than 1 acre (0.40 ha)
- Built: 1892
- Architectural style: Queen Anne/Eastlake
- NRHP reference No.: 84000121
- Added to NRHP: October 25, 1984

The Gustavus Holmes House is a historic residence in Astoria, Oregon, United States.

It was listed on the National Register of Historic Places in 1984.

== See also ==
- National Register of Historic Places listings in Clatsop County, Oregon
