= Daniel Knight Warren House =

Historic house in Oregon, United States

- U.S. National Register of Historic Places
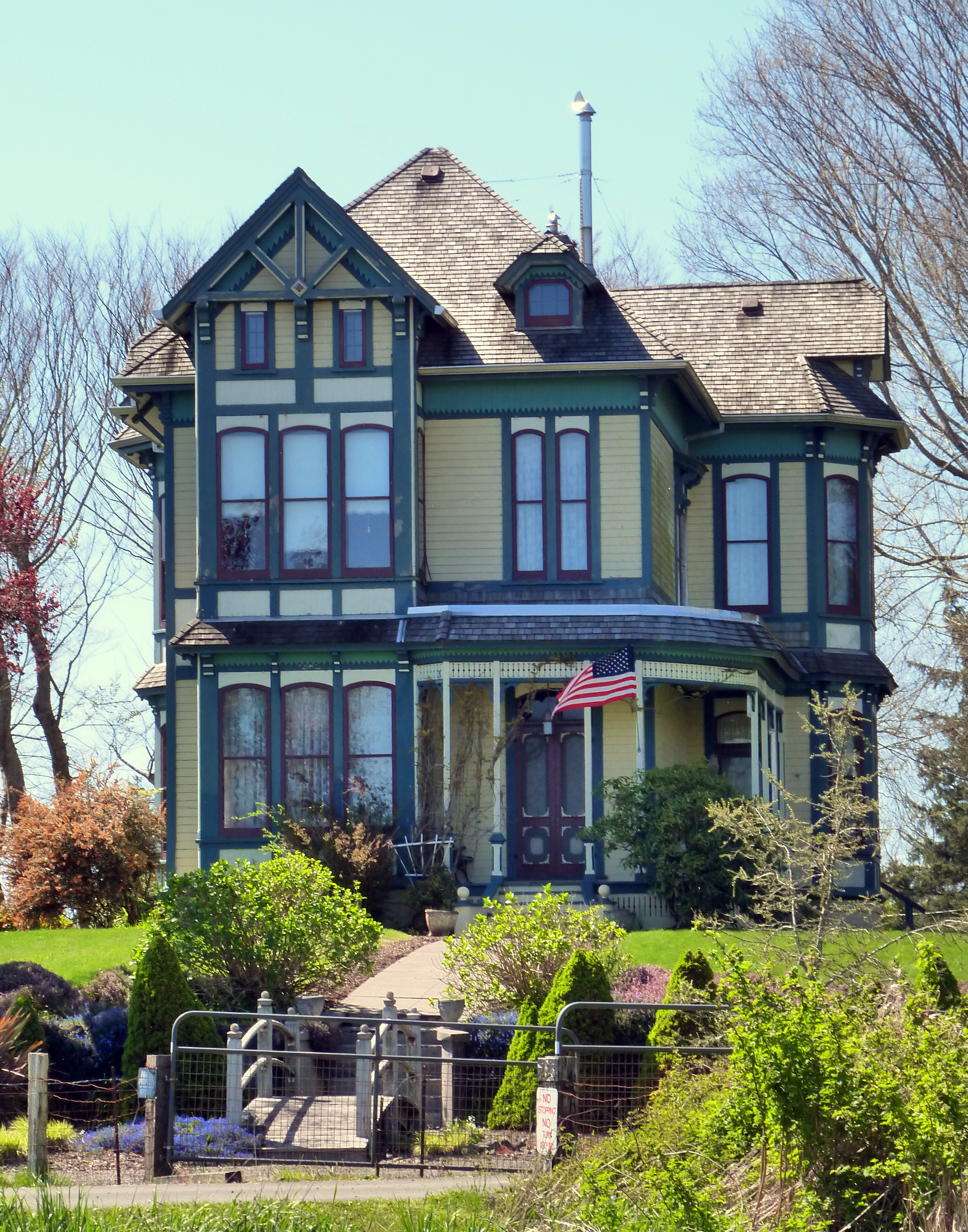
- The house in 2013

- Location within Oregon Location within the United States
- Location: 107 Skipanon Rd., Warrenton, Oregon
- Coordinates: 46°10′8″N 123°55′15″W
- Area: 1.1 acres (0.45 ha)
- Built: 1885
- Architectural style: Late Victorian, Stick/eastlake
- NRHP reference No.: 88001521
- Added to NRHP: September 8, 1988

The Daniel Knight Warren House is a house located in Warrenton, Oregon, that is listed on the National Register of Historic Places. Daniel Knight Warren was an Oregon pioneer born in Bath, New York on March 12, 1836.

== See also ==
- National Register of Historic Places listings in Clatsop County, Oregon
