= United States Post Office (Astoria, Oregon) =

- U.S. Post Office and Custom House
- U.S. National Register of Historic Places
- U.S. Historic district – Contributing property
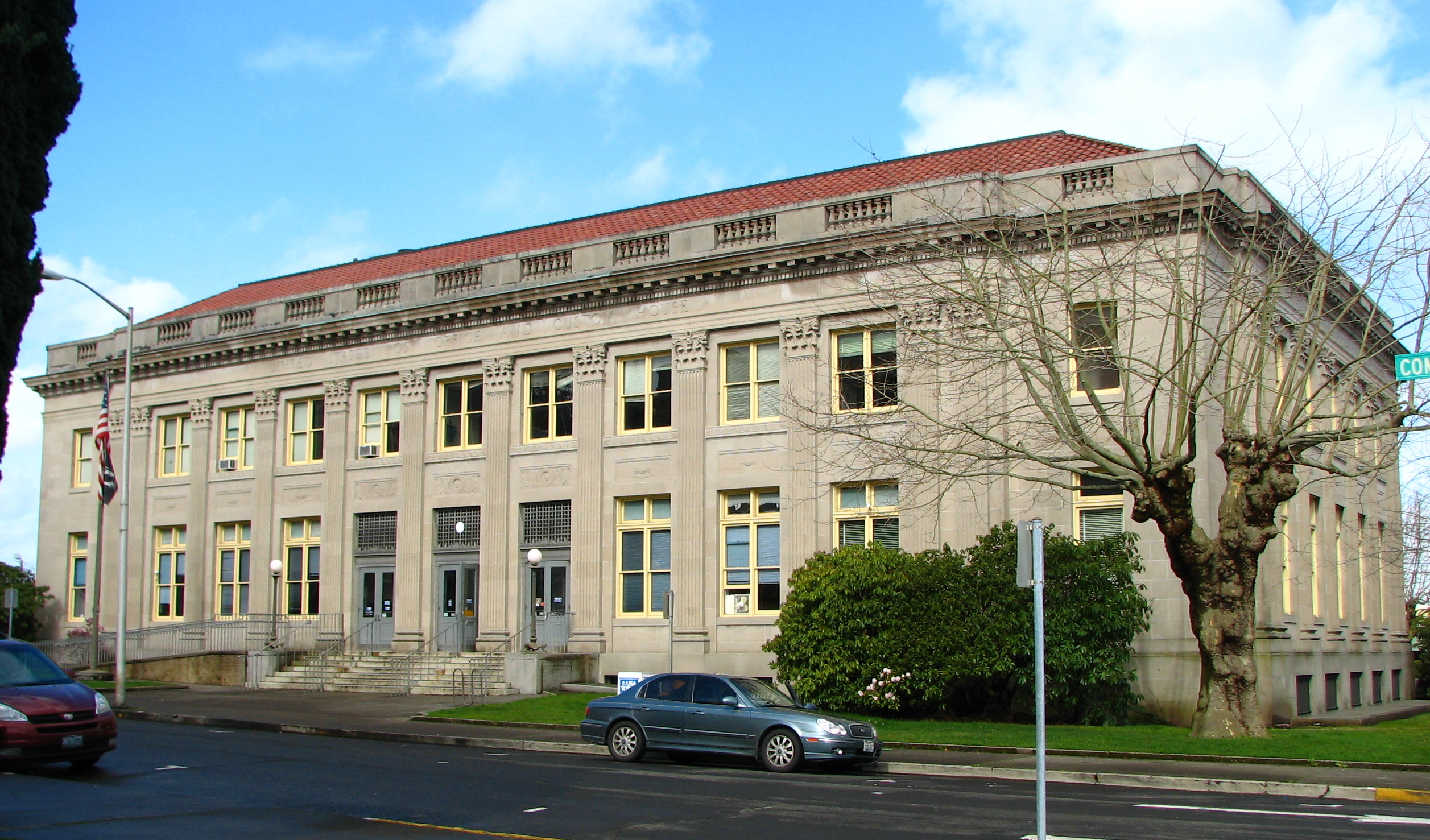
- View from the southeast, across Commercial Street, in 2010

- Location within Oregon Location within the United States
- Interactive map showing the location of U.S. Post Office, Astoria
- Location: 750 Commercial Street; Astoria, Oregon
- Coordinates: 46°11′21″N 123°50′07″W
- Area: 40,000 square feet (3,700 m^{2})
- Built: 1933
- Architectural style: Classical Revival
- Part of: Astoria Downtown Historic District (ID98000631)
- MPS: Significant US Post Offices in Oregon 1900–1941 TR
- NRHP reference No.: 85000542
- Added to NRHP: March 4, 1985

The United States Post Office in Astoria, Oregon, United States, is a historic building constructed in 1933. It is a two-story building on a raised basement. Its exterior dimensions are 79 by 137 feet (24 m × 42 m). Its 11-bay front facade is divided by flat fluted pilasters with Corinthian capitals supporting a full entablature, with a balustraded parapet above, and a red-tiled hipped roof rising behind that. Its foundations had to be blasted by dynamite.

It was listed on the National Register of Historic Places in 1985 under its historic name U.S. Post Office and Custom House.

== See also ==
- National Register of Historic Places listings in Clatsop County, Oregon
