= George Flavel =

American maritime pilot

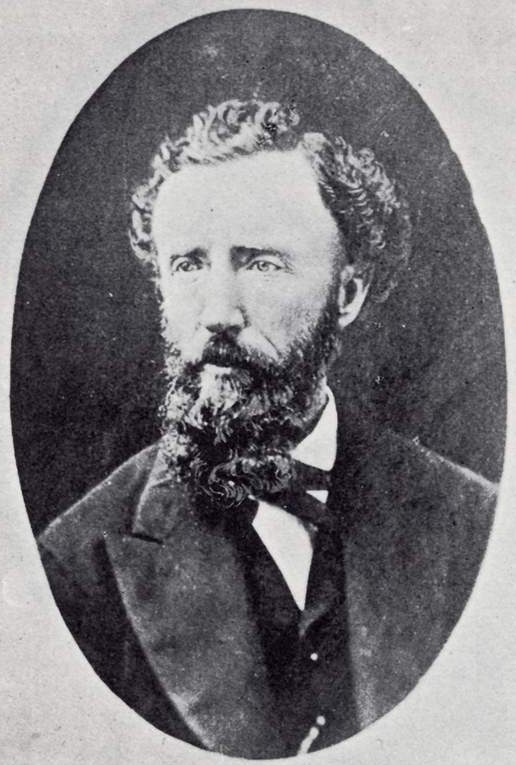
- Undated photo of Flavel (c. 1870)
- Born: November 17, 1823; Portadown, Northern Ireland, or Norfolk, Virginia, U.S. (sources differ) (Note: According to an entry at the International Genealogical Index database, Flavel was born in Portadown, County Armagh, Northern Ireland. However, according to an article published in The Oregonian, as well as in a published 1928 interview with his wife Mary Christina (see Lockley, p. 550), it is noted that Flavel's birthplace was Norfolk, Virginia.)
- Died: July 3, 1893 (aged 69); Astoria, Oregon, U.S.
- Resting place: Ocean View Cemetery, Warrenton, Oregon, U.S. 46.1528°N 123.9393°W
- Occupations: Maritime pilot, businessman
- Spouse: Mary Christina Boelling (m. 1854)

Captain George Edward Flavel (/fləˈvɛl/; November 17, 1823 — July 3, 1893) was an Irish American maritime pilot and entrepreneur. Born in 1823 to Irish parents, Flavel relocated to the West coast of the United States in 1849, working as a tugboat operator between Sacramento and San Francisco, California. In 1851, he settled in the northern coastal port city of Astoria, Oregon, where he became one of the first licensed bar pilots in the state.

Flavel would go on to amass a fortune with a business managing pilot boats on the Columbia River, making him a prominent local figure, and one of the first millionaires in Oregon. In addition to bar piloting, he was involved in several other entrepreneurial endeavors, including operating a wharf in Astoria, and managing a coal business from Australia. At the time of his death in 1893, Flavel had a net worth of nearly US$2 million (equivalent to $71,666,667 in 2025).

His family estate, known as the Captain George Flavel House, was donated to the Clatsop County Historical Society by his great-granddaughter after her inheritance of it in 1933, and contemporarily functions as a museum.

== Biography ==
=== Early life ===
George Flavel was born in 1823. Some sources state he was born in Portadown, County Armagh, Ireland, while others state his birthplace as Norfolk, Virginia, where he had resided in his early life. Flavel was of Irish descent. As a young man in 1849, Flavel relocated by ship to the West coast. He sailed around Cape Horn and also spent time in California during the state's Gold Rush era before relocating to Astoria, Oregon, then a settlement based around John Jacob Astor's American Fur Company. Flavel settled in Astoria after a stint as captain of the brig John Petty.

=== Maritime career ===
Flavel began his career as a sea captain managing ship routes from the Pacific Ocean up the Columbia River and to the Willamette River. In 1850, he was given command of the Goliah, the second tug boat ever built in the United States, driving the boat between Sacramento and San Francisco, California. The following year, in December 1851, he earned his marine piloting license from the state of Oregon.

One of the only mariners in the state to possess a captain's license, Flavel and his partners were able to establish a virtual monopoly on bar piloting and ship tours on the Columbia, which amassed him a great deal of wealth. In January 1852, during a particularly strong gale, the SS General Warren lost its fore-topmast and began to leak near Astoria; Flavel was unable to rescue the ship, and forty-two people aboard died with its sinking. However, Flavel's efforts to save the Warren earned him the reputation of a local hero in the city.

In 1854, Flavel married fourteen-year-old Mary Christina Boelling, whom he met at a hotel in Portland. The couple had three children: George Conrad (1855–1923), Nellie (1858–1933), and Katie (1864–1910). With the continued success of his business enterprise, the family divided their time between Oregon and San Francisco, California, and Flavel was able to afford his children extensive educations in Europe; his daughter, Nellie, became a classically trained pianist and performed with the Organists' Guild of Portland. In 1869, Flavel and his partners built a steam tug, Astoria, and used it as a pilot boat. In addition to his pilot business, Flavel operated a wharf and also purchased and sold coal from Australia as a side business.

=== Later life and death ===
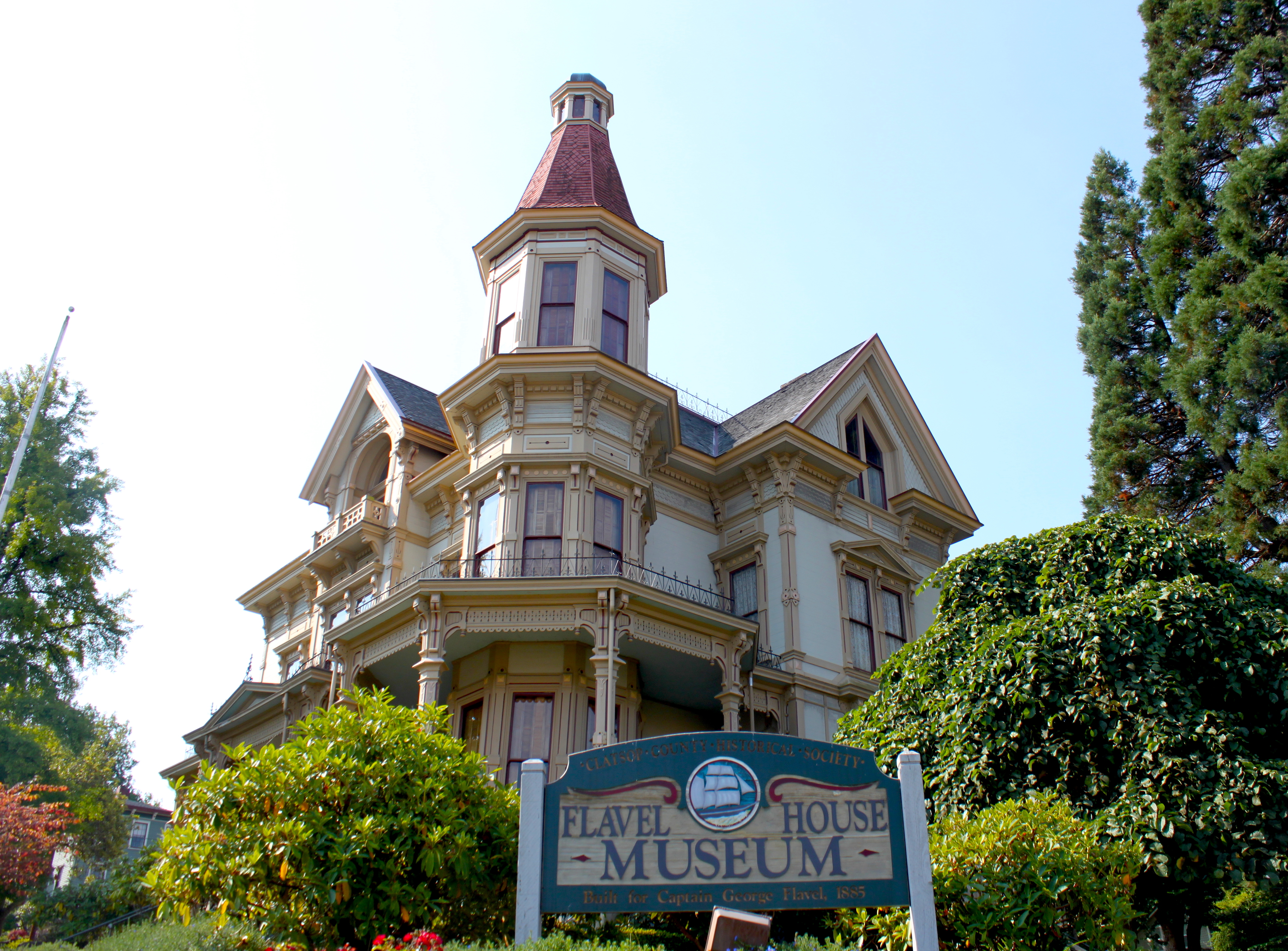
The Flavel residence in Astoria operates as a museum

Flavel built a 11,600-square-foot (1,080 m^{2}) Queen Anne mansion in Astoria in 1886. Built on a lot running an entire city block, the rumored cost of the home was $36,000. Surrounding the house are nine trees planted by the family's gardener, Louis Schultz, which Flavel had acquired from various locations across the world during his voyages. In his later life, Flavel also helped manage the First National Bank of Astoria beginning in 1886; he served as its president until his death.

Flavel died in 1893 with a reported net worth of $1.9 million (equivalent to $68,083,333 in 2025). His funeral procession was one of the largest in the history of Astoria. In 1897, Flavel's body was relocated for interment at Ocean View Cemetery in Warrenton, Oregon.

In a 1922 interview with his widow, Mary Christina, she said of her husband's success: "One of the reasons why my husband made a success as a pilot on the Columbia River bar was that he was not only an able navigator, but he was fearless and was willing to put out in any sort of weather to assist vessels in need of help." The Flavel mansion, known as the Captain George Flavel House, now functions as a museum serving the city of Astoria. Flavel's eldest great-granddaughter, Patricia Jean Flavel, inherited the home from her aunt Nellie Flavel, and donated the property to the Clatsop County Historical Society around 1934. Patricia Jean Flavel died in 2014 at age 101.

== See also ==
- Columbia River Bar Pilots
- List of sea captains
- List of shipwrecks of Oregon

== Works cited ==
- Lockley, Fred (1928). History of the Columbia River Valley From The Dalles to the Sea. Vol. III. Chicago, Illinois: The S. J. Clarke Publishing Company. ISBN 1258824620. OCLC 51721752.
- Marschner, Janice (2013). Oregon 1859: A Snapshot in Time. Timber Press. ISBN 978-1-604-69508-3.
- Miller, Emma Gene (1958). Clatsop County, Oregon: Its History, Legends and Industries. Binfords & Mort.
- Powers, Dennis M. (2009). Taking the Sea: Perilous Waters, Sunken Ships, and the True Story of the Legendary Wrecker Captains. AMACOM. ISBN 978-0-814-41353-1.
- Sims, Norman; Kramer, Mark William (1995). Literary Journalism: A New Collection of the Best American Nonfiction. Ballantine Books. ISBN 978-0-345-38222-1.
- Williams, Greg H. (2014). The Liberty Ships of World War II: A Record of the 2,710 Vessels and Their Builders, Operators and Namesakes, with a History of the Jeremiah O'Brien. McFarland. ISBN 978-0-786-47945-0.
