= Captain George Flavel House Museum =

Historic house in Oregon, United States

- Captain George Flavel House
- U.S. National Register of Historic Places
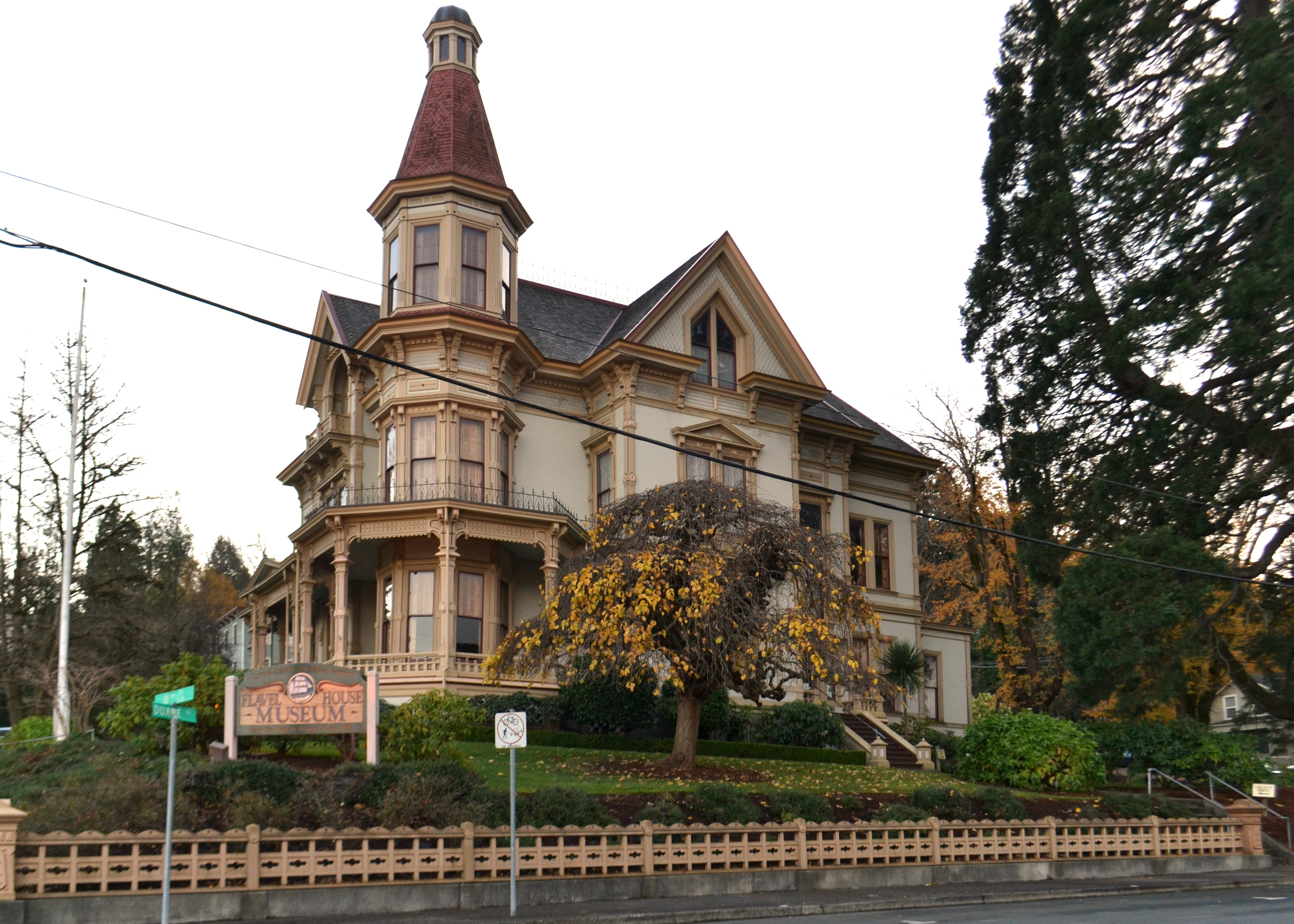
- The main house (and museum) in 2011

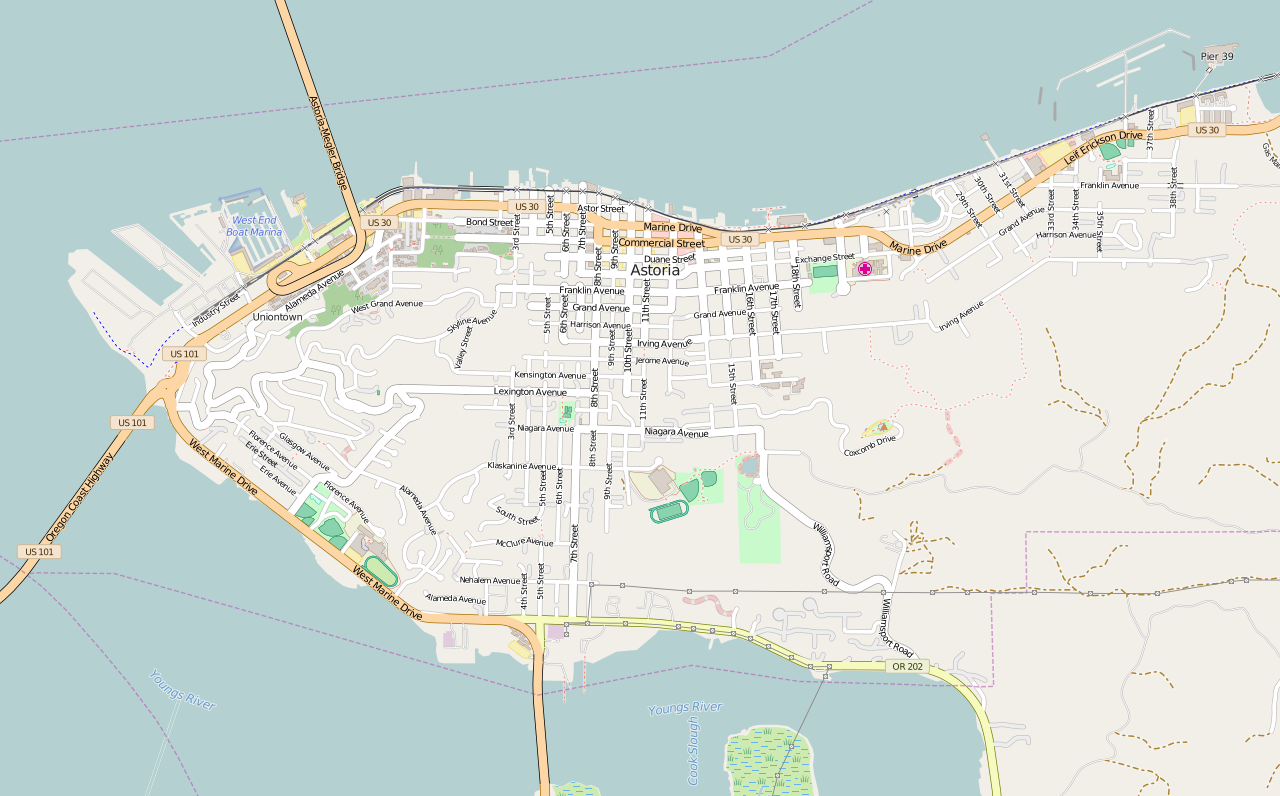
- Location within Astoria OR
- Location: 441 8th Street; Astoria, Oregon, U.S.
- Coordinates: 46.188056°N 123.835°W
- Area: 11,600-square-foot (1,080 m^{2})
- Built: 1885
- Architect: Carl W. Leick
- Architectural style: Queen Anne
- NRHP reference No.: 80003307
- Added to NRHP: November 28, 1980

The Captain George Flavel House Museum (/flʌvɛl/) known also as Capt. George Flavel House and Carriage House or the Flavel Mansion, is now a house museum in Astoria, Oregon. It was built in 1885 in the Queen Anne architectural style, by George Flavel, a Columbia River bar pilot who was one of the area's first millionaires.

== History ==
The house was originally constructed in 1885 by George Flavel, a maritime pilot and entrepreneur who amassed a fortune in his business over the course of thirty years. The 11,600-square-foot (1,080 m^{2}) house, which spans a whole city block, features Queen Anne architecture. After Flavel's death in 1893, his wife, Mary Christina, lived in the house with the couple's daughters, Nellie and Katie, until her death in 1922. Both Katie and Nellie also lived in the home until their deaths in 1910 and 1933, respectively.

The house and its carriage house were listed on the National Register of Historic Places in 1980. The house is owned and operated by the Clatsop County Historical Society.

== In popular culture ==
The museum is well known to fans of the film The Goonies, which was filmed in Astoria. It is featured as the museum where Mikey's father works as a curator. The museum also appeared as the location for the Raven's End Mortuary in The Mortuary Collection.

== Gallery ==
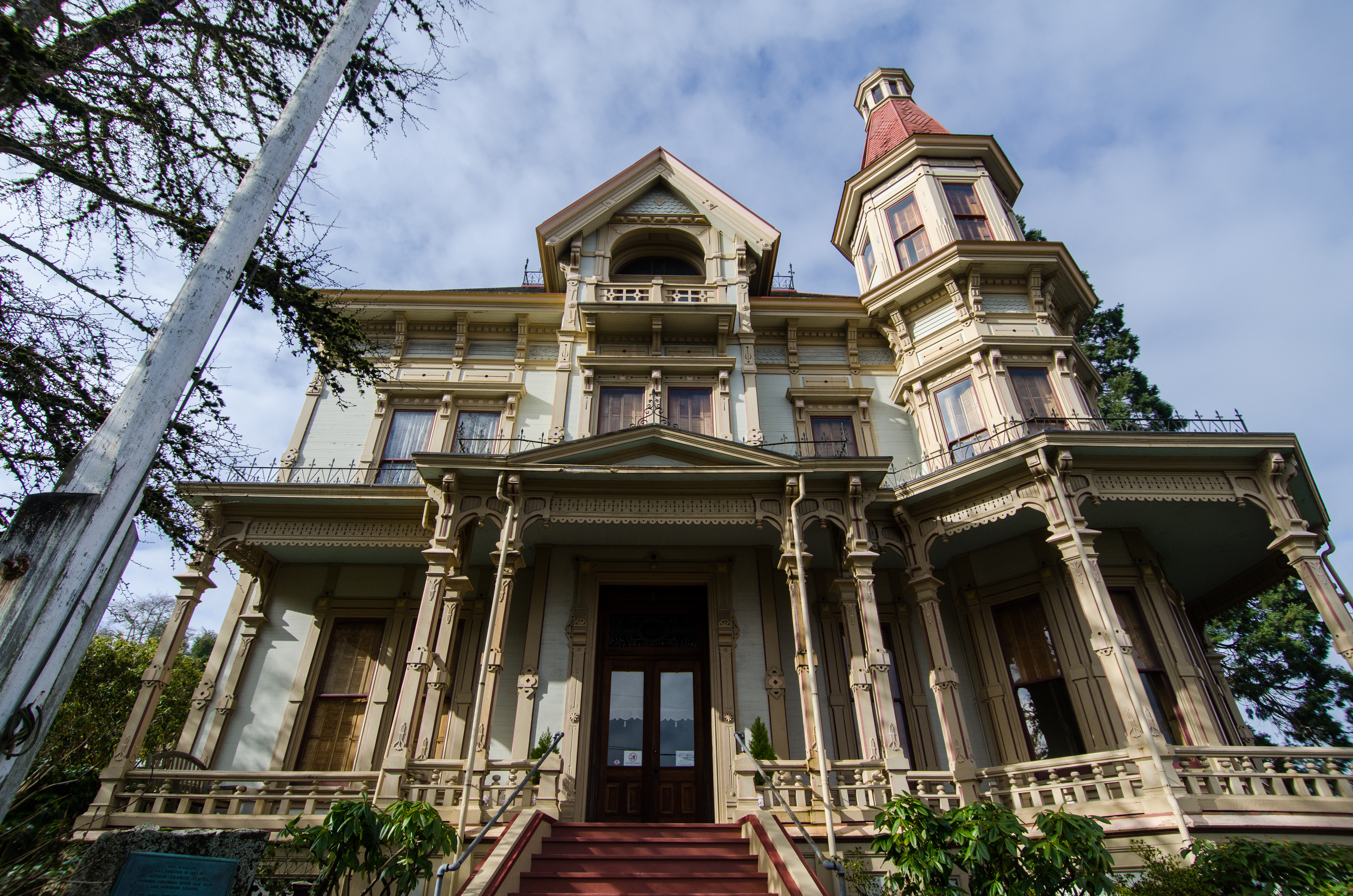
House viewed from steps.

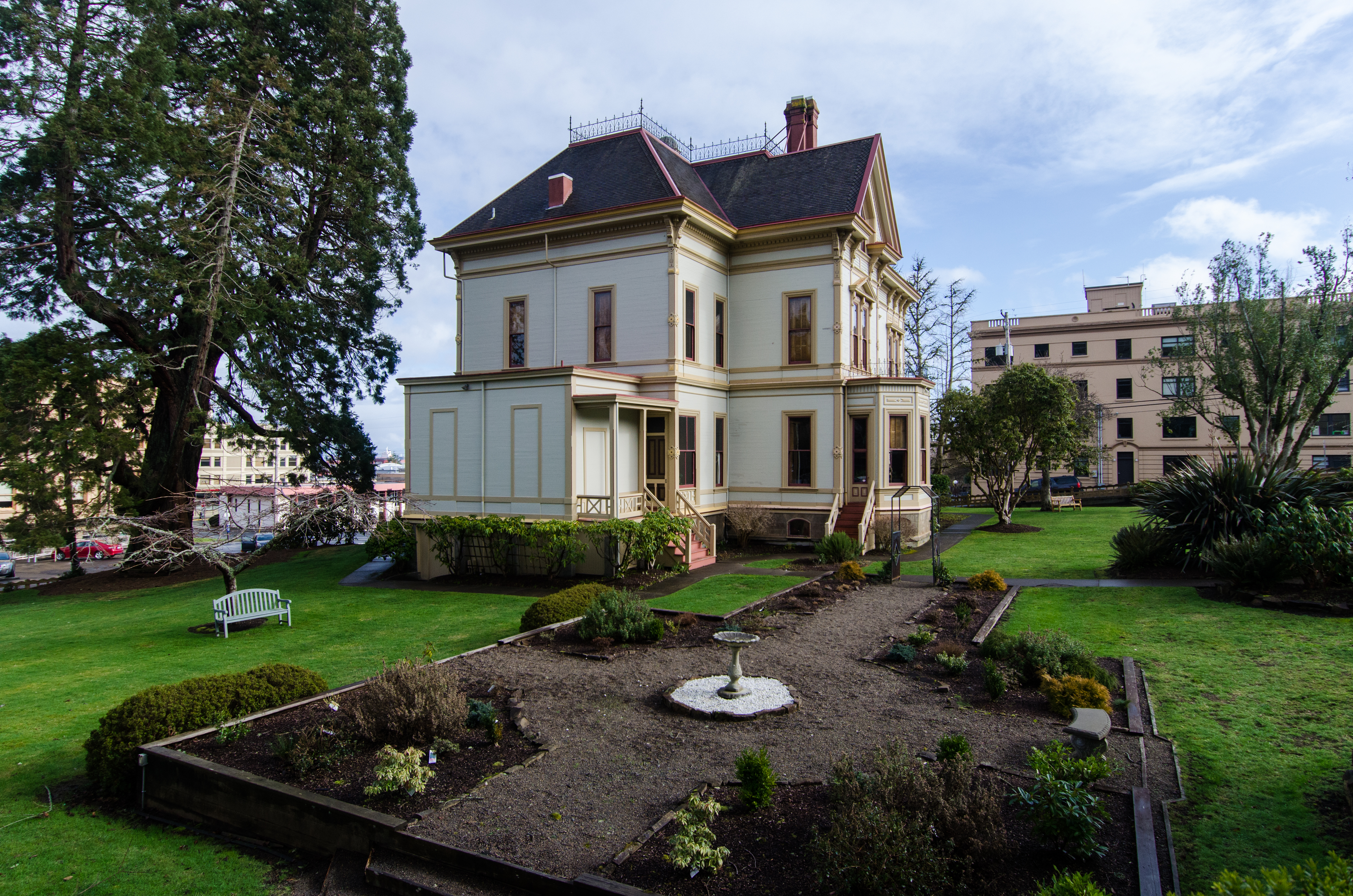
Garden of the house.

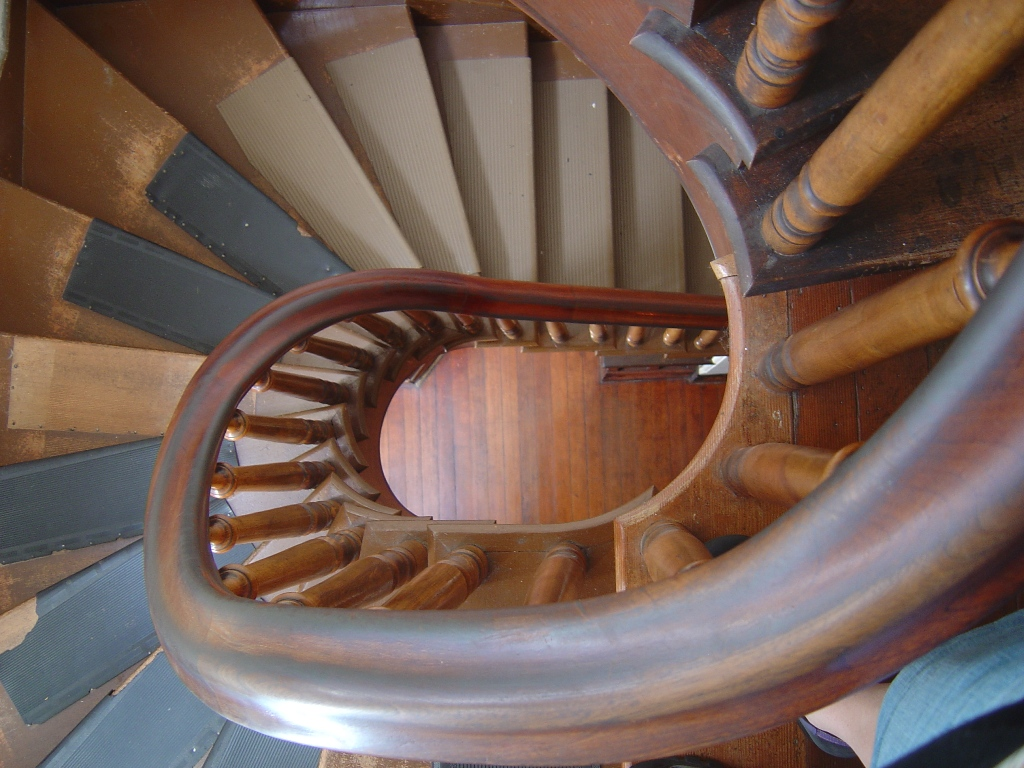
Interior staircase.

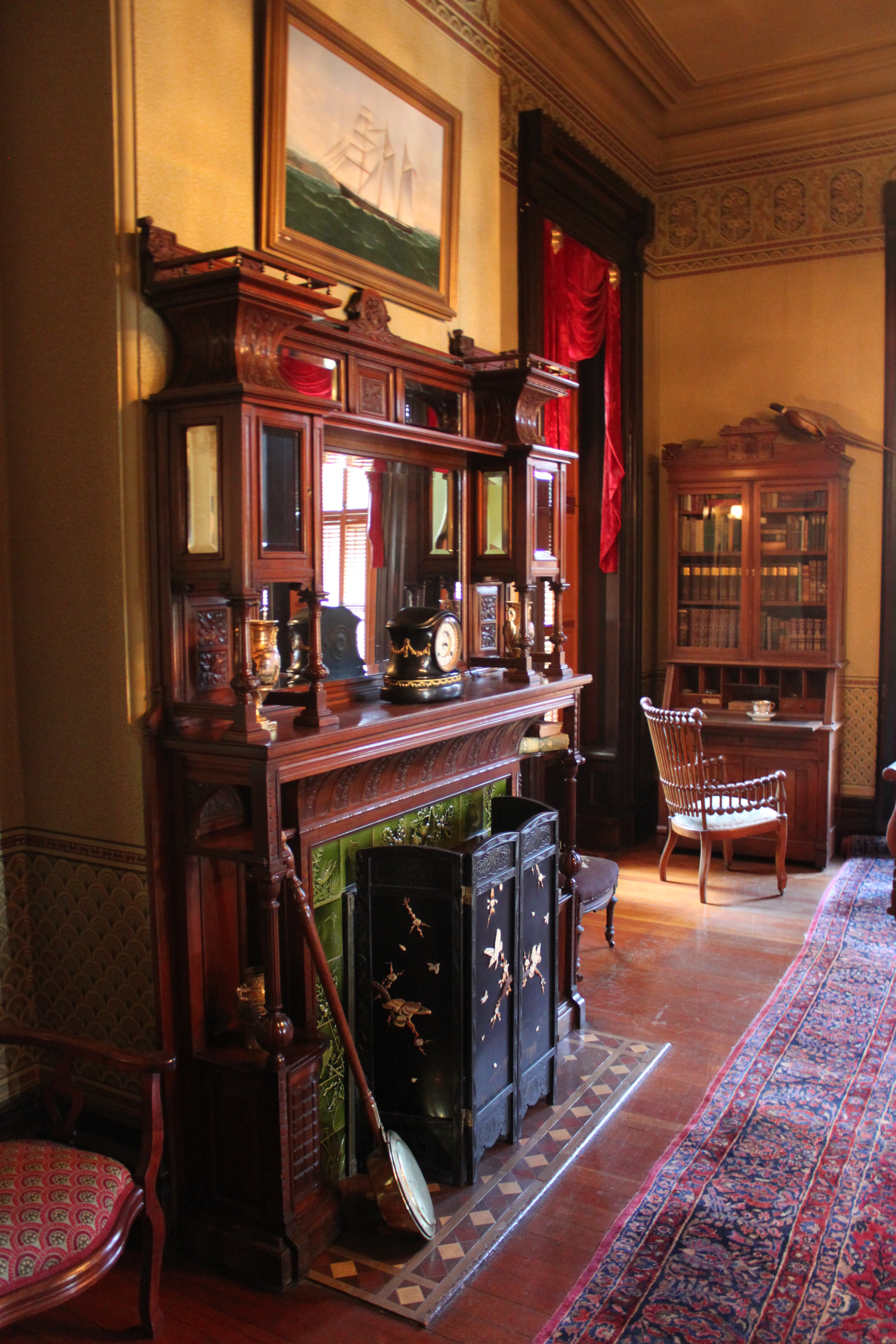
Parlor fireplace.

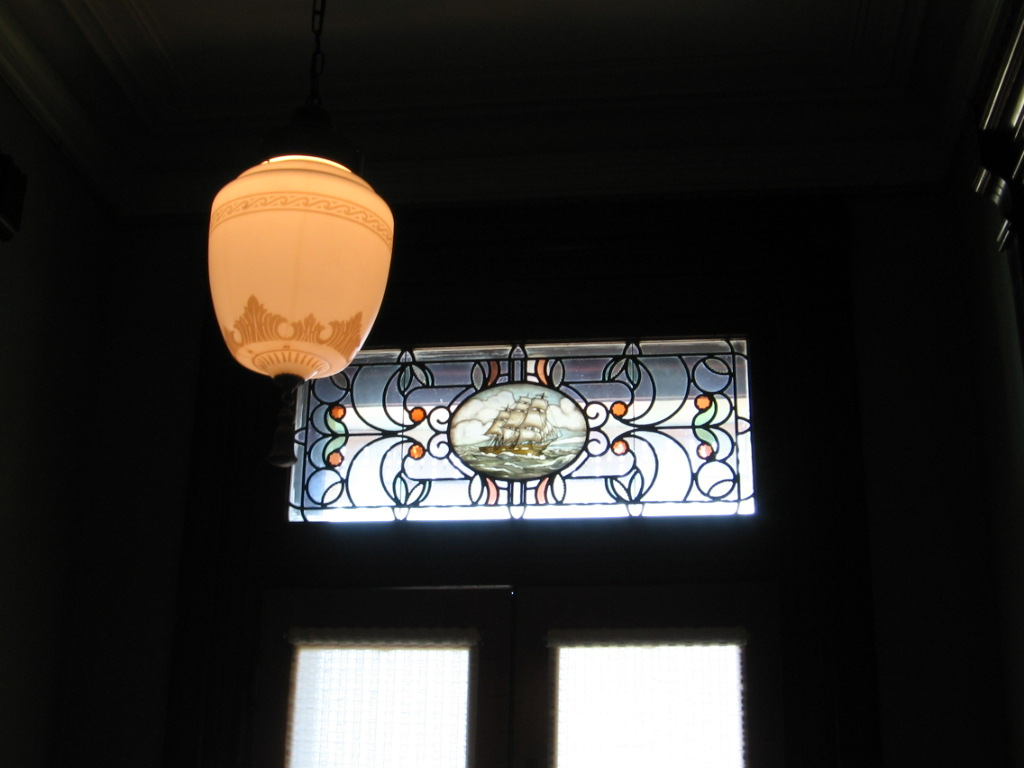
Stained glass window above front door.

== See also ==
- Captain George Conrad Flavel House, 627 Fifteenth St., Astoria, also NRHP-listed
- George C. and Winona Flavel House, 818 Grand Ave., Astoria, also NRHP-listed

== Notes and references ==
=== References ===
- Lockley, Fred (1928). History of the Columbia River Valley From The Dalles to the Sea. Vol. III. The S. J. Clarke Publishing Company.
- Marschner, Janice (2013). Oregon 1859: A Snapshot in Time. Timber Press. ISBN 978-1-604-69508-3.
- Perez, Andrea Larson (2016). Astoria. Arcadia Publishing. ISBN 978-1-467-11647-3.
