= Warrenton, Oregon =

City in Oregon, United States

- City
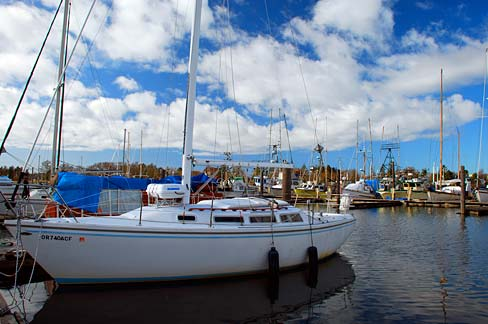
- Warrenton marina
- Motto: "Making a Difference through excellence of service"
- Location in Oregon
- Coordinates: 46°9′54″N 123°54′27″W
- Country: United States
- State: Oregon
- County: Clatsop
- Incorporated: 1899

Government
  - Mayor: Henry Balensifer

Area
  - Total: 17.03 sq mi (44.11 km^{2})
  - Land: 12.66 sq mi (32.78 km^{2})
  - Water: 4.37 sq mi (11.33 km^{2})
- Elevation: 7 ft (2.1 m)

Population (2020)
  - Total: 6,277
  - Density: 496.0/sq mi (191.49/km^{2})
- Time zone: UTC−08:00 (Pacific)
  - Summer (DST): UTC−07:00 (Pacific)
- ZIP code: 97146
- Area codes: 503 and 971
- FIPS code: 41-78900
- GNIS feature ID: 2412184
- Website: www.warrentonoregon.us

Warrenton is a small, coastal city in Clatsop County, Oregon, United States. Named for D.K. (Daniel Knight) Warren, an early settler, the town is primarily a fishing and logging community. The population was 6,277 according to the 2020 US Census. Warrenton is a less urbanized area close to the Clatsop County seat, Astoria.

== History ==
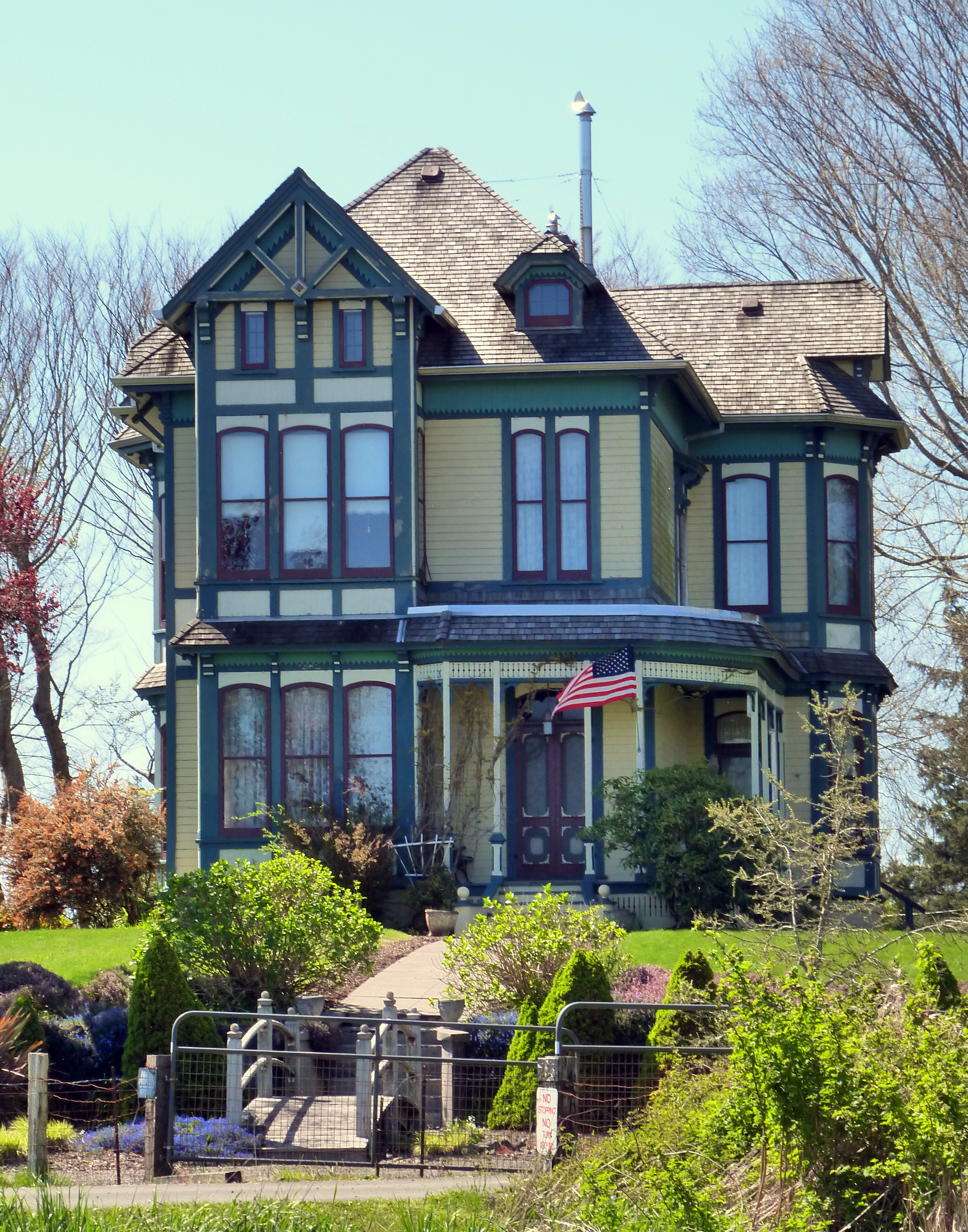
D.K. Warren House, built 1885

Prior to the arrival of the first settlers, this land was inhabited by the Clatsop tribe of Native Americans, whose tribe spanned from the south shore of the Columbia River to Tillamook Head. The county in which Warrenton is located was named after these people, as well as the last encampment that the Lewis and Clark Expedition established. Today, a replica of Fort Clatsop still stands just outside of Warrenton city limits.

The first pioneers who settled on the land that would become Warrenton (between 1845 and the early 1850s) were Jeremiah Gerome Tuller, J. W. Wallace, D. E. Pease, Ninian A. Eberman and George Washington Coffenbury. Coffenbury remains a household name in the town, as a local lake in Fort Stevens was named after him.

The first settlement within Warrenton city limits was Lexington, which was laid out in 1848, and served as the first county seat for Clatsop County. The name fell out of use for a time, and the area became known as Skipanon – a name that is now preserved by the Skipanon River, which flows through the town. A Lexington post office operated intermittently between 1850 and 1857; a Skipanon post office operated continuously from 1871 to 1903.

In 1863, the military battery, Fort Stevens, was built in the Warrenton area near the mouth of the Columbia River. Though military activity ceased in 1947, the remains of the fort are preserved as part of Fort Stevens.

Very few improvements were made to the land until the early 1870s, when D. K. Warren bought out some of the first settlers. With the help of Chinese labor, Warren reclaimed a large tract of the land by constructing a dike about 2.5 miles (4.0 km) in length, which was completed in 1878. Warren laid out the town in about 1891, and in the following year built the first schoolhouse, at a cost of $1,100, and gave it to the school district.

Warrenton was platted in 1889 and incorporated as a city in 1899. Built on tidal flats, it relied on a system of dikes built by Chinese laborers to keep the Columbia River from flooding the town.

== Geography ==
Standing at the northwestern extreme of Oregon, Warrenton is about 5 miles (8.0 km) west of Astoria, across the Youngs Bay bridge, which spans over 4,200 feet (1,300 m) of the Youngs Bay estuary at the mouth of the Columbia River.

According to the United States Census Bureau, the city has a total area of 17.66 square miles (45.74 km^{2}), 12.77 square miles (33.07 km^{2}) of which is land and 4.89 square miles (12.67 km^{2}) is water.

Warrenton has one charter fishing port in Hammond and a major commercial fishing port in downtown Warrenton.

=== Community ===
Warrenton is made up of the previously individual communities of Flavel, Fort Stevens, Hammond, Lexington, and Skipanon. The Fort Stevens post office operated at the Fort Stevens military post from 1899 to 1949. Hammond voted to disincorporate in November 1991 and merged with Warrenton on December 5. Hammond was named for lumberman Andrew B. Hammond, who completed the Astoria and Columbia River Railroad. Hammond, originally the site of a Clatsop village called Ne-ahk-stow, has its own ZIP Code of 97121, but is now technically part of Warrenton.

=== Climate ===
This region experiences mildly warm and dry summers, with no average monthly temperatures above 71.6 °F (22.0 °C). It is typically overcast or rainy due to its proximity to the ocean, but it does have some sunshine. According to the Köppen Climate Classification system, Warrenton has a warm-summer Mediterranean climate, abbreviated Csb on climate maps.

== Demographics ==
Historical population
Census	Pop.	Note	%±
1900	332		—
1910	339		2.1%
1920	730		115.3%
1930	683		−6.4%
1940	1,365		99.9%
1950	1,896		38.9%
1960	1,717		−9.4%
1970	1,825		6.3%
1980	2,493		36.6%
1990	2,681		7.5%
2000	4,096		52.8%
2010	4,989		21.8%
2020	6,277		25.8%

=== 2020 census ===
As of the 2020 census, Warrenton had a population of 6,277. The median age was 38.0 years. 22.9% of residents were under the age of 18 and 17.8% of residents were 65 years of age or older. For every 100 females there were 98.0 males, and for every 100 females age 18 and over there were 96.3 males age 18 and over.

83.0% of residents lived in urban areas, while 17.0% lived in rural areas.

There were 2,497 households in Warrenton, of which 30.5% had children under the age of 18 living in them. Of all households, 43.9% were married-couple households, 19.9% were households with a male householder and no spouse or partner present, and 26.8% were households with a female householder and no spouse or partner present. About 27.3% of all households were made up of individuals and 13.4% had someone living alone who was 65 years of age or older.

There were 2,715 housing units, of which 2,497 were occupied and 218 were vacant, representing an 8.0% vacancy rate. Among occupied housing units, 58.7% were owner-occupied and 41.3% were renter-occupied. The homeowner vacancy rate was 1.7% and the rental vacancy rate was 3.6%.

Racial composition as of the 2020 census
Race	Number	Percent
White	5,157	82.2%
Black or African American	37	0.6%
American Indian and Alaska Native	74	1.2%
Asian	100	1.6%
Native Hawaiian and Other Pacific Islander	25	0.4%
Some other race	258	4.1%
Two or more races	626	10.0%
Hispanic or Latino (of any race)	571	9.1%

=== 2010 census ===
As of the census of 2010, there were 4,989 people, 1,948 households, and 1,287 families residing in the city. The population density was 390.7 inhabitants per square mile (150.9/km^{2}). There were 2,196 housing units at an average density of 172.0 per square mile (66.4/km^{2}). The racial makeup of the city was 91.5% White, 0.6% African American, 1.3% Native American, 1.1% Asian, 0.7% Pacific Islander, 1.8% from other races, and 3.0% from two or more races. Hispanic or Latino of any race were 5.7% of the population.

There were 1,948 households, of which 31.3% had children under the age of 18 living with them, 48.5% were married couples living together, 11.7% had a female householder with no husband present, 5.9% had a male householder with no wife present, and 33.9% were non-families. 26.4% of all households were made up of individuals, and 10% had someone living alone who was 65 years of age or older. The average household size was 2.45 and the average family size was 2.95.

The median age in the city was 37.6 years. 23.8% of residents were under the age of 18; 9.8% were between the ages of 18 and 24; 25.2% were from 25 to 44; 27.4% were from 45 to 64; and 14% were 65 years of age or older. The gender makeup of the city was 51.0% male and 49.0% female.

=== 2000 census ===
At the 2000 census, there were 4,096 people, 1,621 households and 1,087 families residing in the city. The population density was 332.2 inhabitants per square mile (128.3/km^{2}). There were 1,799 housing units at an average density of 145.9 per square mile (56.3/km^{2}). The racial makeup of the city was 92.53% White, 0.22% African American, 1.32% Native American, 1.76% Asian, 0.07% Pacific Islander, 1.27% from other races, and 2.83% from two or more races. Hispanic or Latino of any race were 2.91% of the population. 15.4% were of American, 12.1% German, 9.2% English, 8.9% Irish and 8.1% Norwegian ancestry according to Census 2000.

There were 1,621 households, of which 33.7% had children under the age of 18 living with them, 52.1% were married couples living together, 11.0% had a female householder with no husband present, and 32.9% were non-families. 26.5% of all households were made up of individuals, and 10.2% had someone living alone who was 65 years of age or older. The average household size was 2.49 and the average family size was 3.00.

Age distribution was 26.6% under the age of 18, 8.2% from 18 to 24, 29.8% from 25 to 44, 22.4% from 45 to 64, and 13.1% who were 65 years of age or older. The median age was 37 years. For every 100 females, there were 103.0 males. For every 100 females age 18 and over, there were 100.3 males.

The median household income was $33,472, and the median family income was $42,946. Males had a median income of $31,654 versus $21,133 for females. The per capita income for the city was $16,874. About 11.9% of families and 14.2% of the population were below the poverty line, including 19.4% of those under age 18 and 11.7% of those age 65 or over.

== Education ==
Warrenton High School is a small school with a total enrollment of between 300 and 400. Warrenton Grade School is a K-5 school with a total enrollment of about 700 students. In 2021, Warrenton Middle School opened to the east of Highway 101. Warrenton Grade School now serves about 480 students while the new middle school serves about 250 students. All three schools claim the name “Warrior” as their mascot.

== Notable people ==
- Brian Bruney, Major League Baseball pitcher
- Clara C. Munson, first woman elected mayor in Oregon during the 20th century
- Janet Stevenson, writer

== See also ==
- Daniel Knight Warren House
