= Shanghaied =

Shanghaied may refer to:

- Shanghaiing, or forced conscription
- "Shanghai'd in Shanghai", a song by Scottish rock band Nazareth from their 1974 album Rampant
- Shanghaied (1915 film), a film starring Charlie Chaplin
- Shanghaied (1927 film), a 1927 American silent film
- Shanghaied (1934 film), an animated short film starring Mickey Mouse
- "Shanghaied" (SpongeBob SquarePants), an episode of the animated cartoon series SpongeBob SquarePants
- "Shanghaied", a song by Chinese language R&B singer David Tao from his 2003 album UltraSound
- Shanghaied in Astoria, a 1984 musical melodrama
- Shanghaied Love, a 1931 American film
- Shanghaied Shipmates, a 1936 Looney Tunes animated film
