= Garden of Surging Waves =

Chinese garden and park in Astoria, Oregon, U.S.

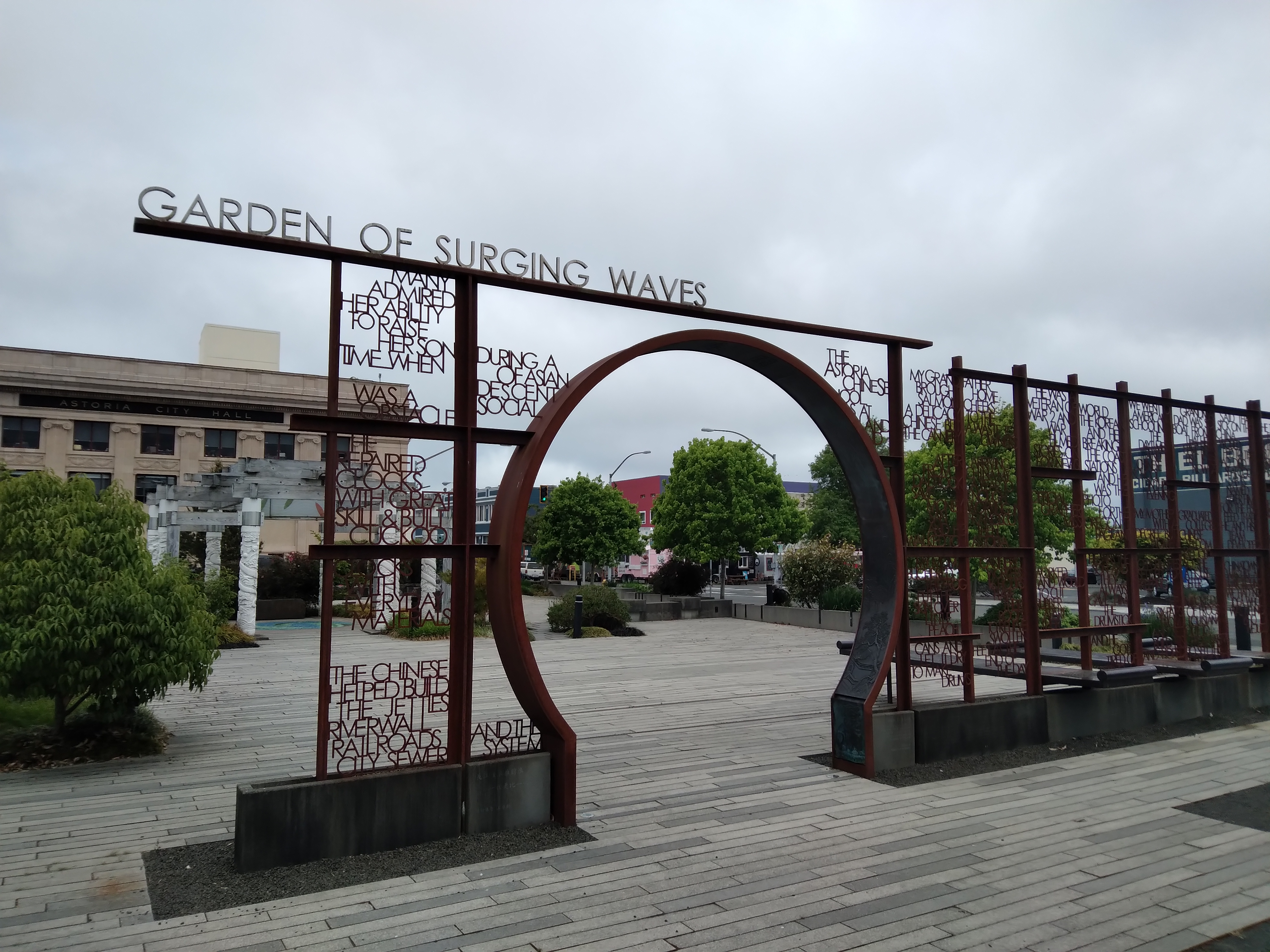
- Entrance dome to the garden
- Interactive map of Garden of Surging Waves
- Location: Astoria, Oregon
- Coordinates: 46°11′17″N 123°49′53″W
- Status: Under construction

The Garden of Surging Waves (simplified Chinese: 沧浪园; traditional Chinese: 滄浪園; pinyin: Cānglàng Yuán; Jyutping: Cong1long4 Jyun4), is a Chinese garden and city park currently under construction in Astoria, Oregon. The Astoria City Council selected the garden as city's bicentennial legacy gift in recognition of Astoria's Chinese heritage.

The Garden of Surging Waves will occupy the northwest corner of Heritage Square — the block bound by Duane, Exchange, 11th and 12th Streets, adjacent to City Hall.

== History ==
The garden's ceremonial ground breaking took place at Heritage Square in front of Astoria City Hall on April 14, 2012.

== See also ==
- List of botanical gardens in the United States
- List of Chinese gardens
