= Astoria City Hall (old) =

- U.S. National Register of Historic Places
- U.S. Historic district – Contributing property
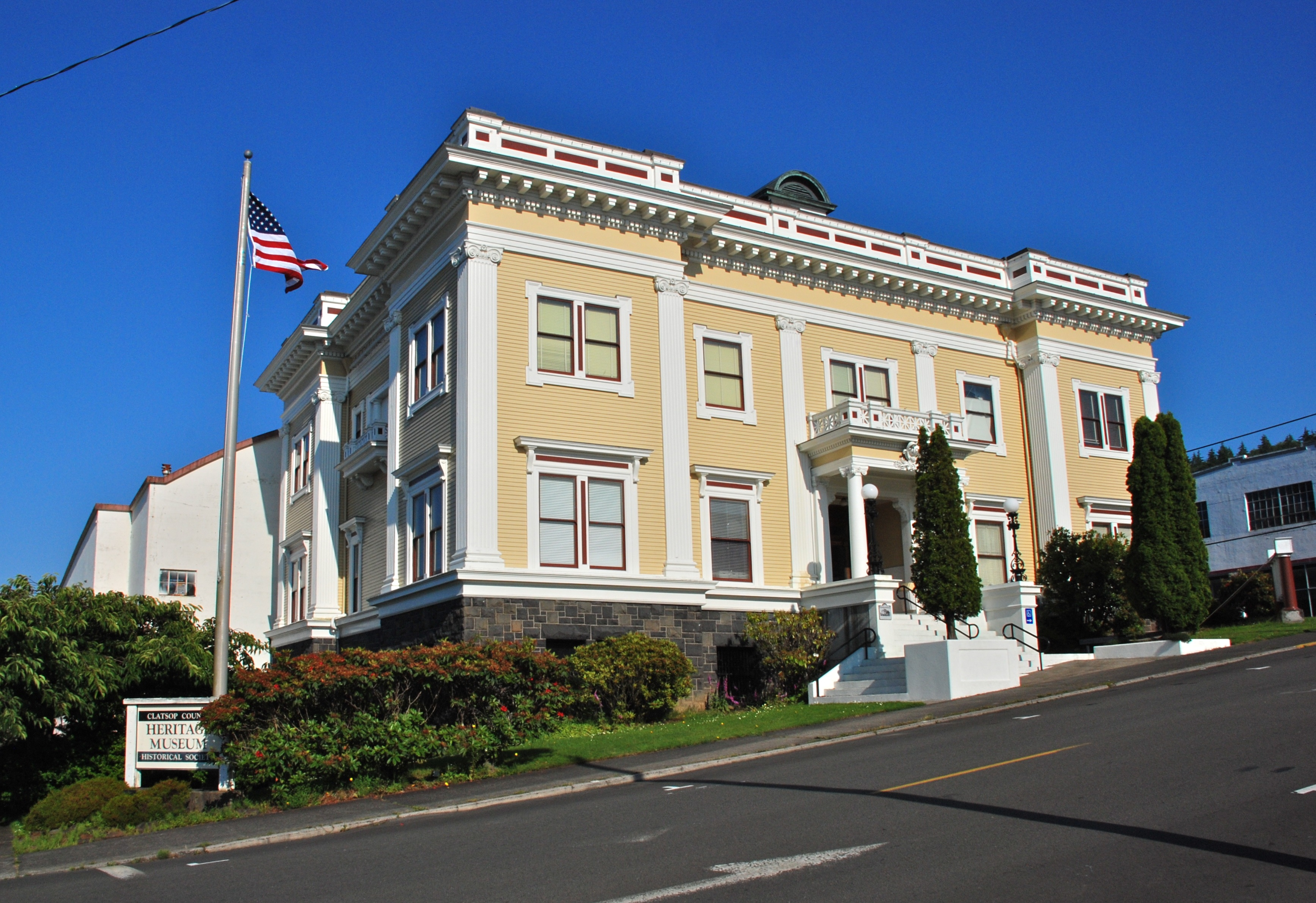
- The Old Astoria City Hall (now the Clatsop County Historical Society Heritage Museum) in 2012

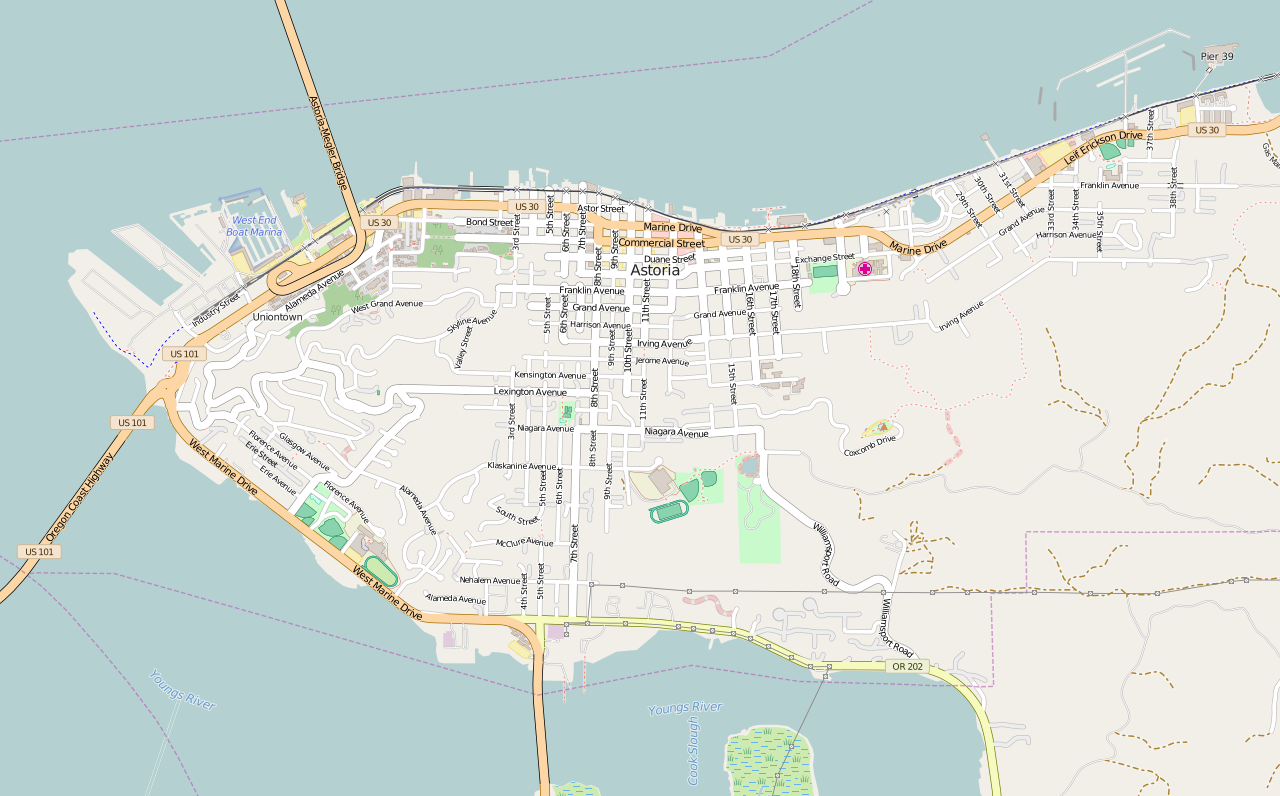
- Location within Astoria OR
- Location: 1618 Exchange Street; Astoria, Oregon
- Coordinates: 46°11′18.1″N 123°49′31.3″W
- Area: less than one acre
- Built: 1904–05
- Architect: Emil Schacht
- Architectural style: Colonial Revival
- Part of: Astoria Downtown Historic District (ID98000631)
- NRHP reference No.: 84002940
- Added to NRHP: September 7, 1984

The Old Astoria City Hall, now known as the Clatsop County Historical Society Heritage Museum, is a historic building located in Astoria, Oregon, United States, that is listed on the National Register of Historic Places. The building served as the city hall of Astoria from 1905 until 1939. It was the first location of the Columbia River Maritime Museum, from 1963 to 1982, and has been the Heritage Museum since 1985.

== History as city hall ==
The first Astoria city hall was designed and built in 1878 by Albert W. Ferguson. His son's firm of Ferguson & Houston also built the second building, located at 16th and Exchange streets, but the building's design was by Emil Schacht. The new building would be larger than its predecessor, as well as more modern. Construction began in 1904 and was completed in June 1905. The second Astoria City Hall was formally dedicated on July 4, 1905. All city offices, as well as the city library, were located in the new building.

In the 1930s, it was decided to move city hall to a location in downtown, as the location at 16th and Exchange streets was rather isolated; the original, 1878 city hall had also been located in downtown Astoria.

The city used a Public Works Administration grant to fund the conversion of a former bank building on Duane Street into a New City Hall. The city offices were moved out of the Old Astoria City Hall on Exchange Street, into the new premises, at the end of March 1939.

== Later use ==
Since the end of its function as city hall, the two-story building has been put to various other uses. In the 1940s, the city allowed the State of Oregon to use it as an annex to an armory built at that time and located just to the east. Later, the U.S.O. used the building as its local headquarters. It moved out in 1960, leaving the building vacant.

In 1963, the building was turned into the first Columbia River Maritime Museum, which opened in August of that year. It served this purpose for almost 20 years, until that museum moved to a new location on the riverfront, in 1982. The building was added to the National Register of Historic Places in 1984, as Astoria City Hall. To avoid confusion with the existing Astoria City Hall, the Oregon Parks and Recreation Department identifies the building as "Astoria City Hall (Old)" in its list of registered historic properties in Oregon.

In 1980, members of the Clatsop County Historical Society voted to purchase the Old City Hall and renovate it for use as a museum. The purchase was completed in 1985, and the first stage of the society's Heritage Museum (originally "Heritage Center") opened in 1985. Interior renovation and exterior restoration were carried out in 1987–88, funded by private grants and donations.

== See also ==
- List of museums in Oregon
- National Register of Historic Places listings in Clatsop County, Oregon
