= 1922 Astoria, Oregon fire =

Coordinates: 46.187°N 123.830°W

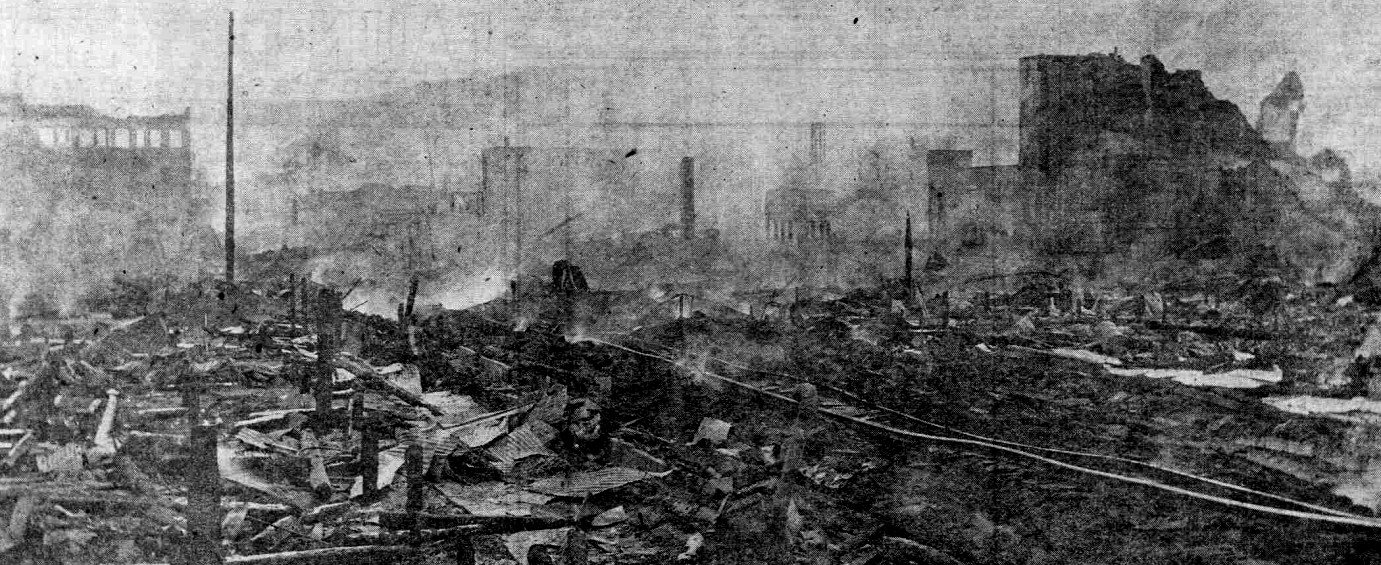
Photograph showing the fire's aftermath

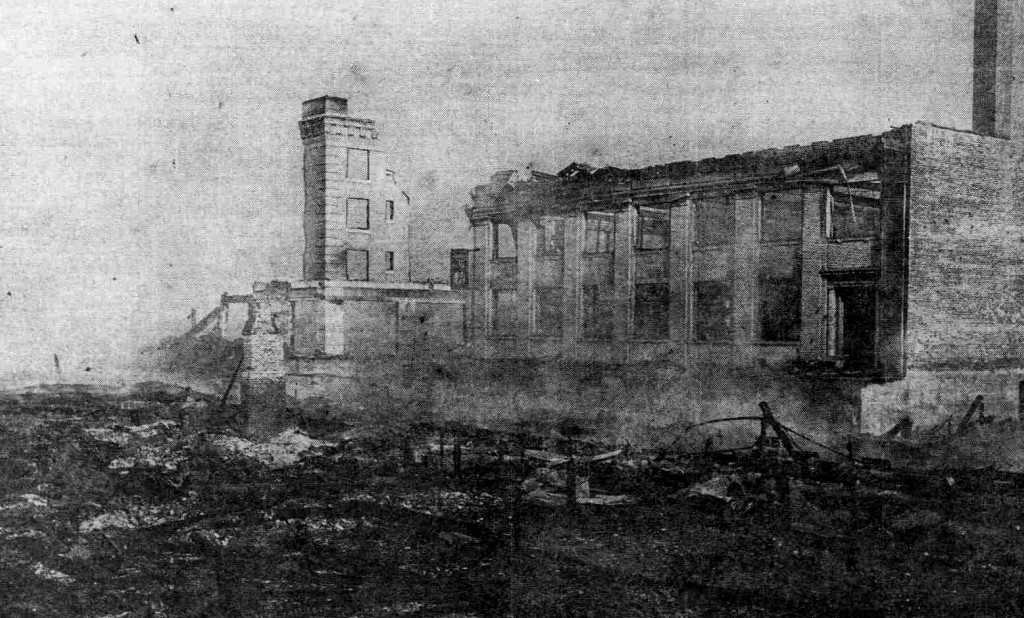
Remnants of the Weinhard Hotel and the Astoria National Bank

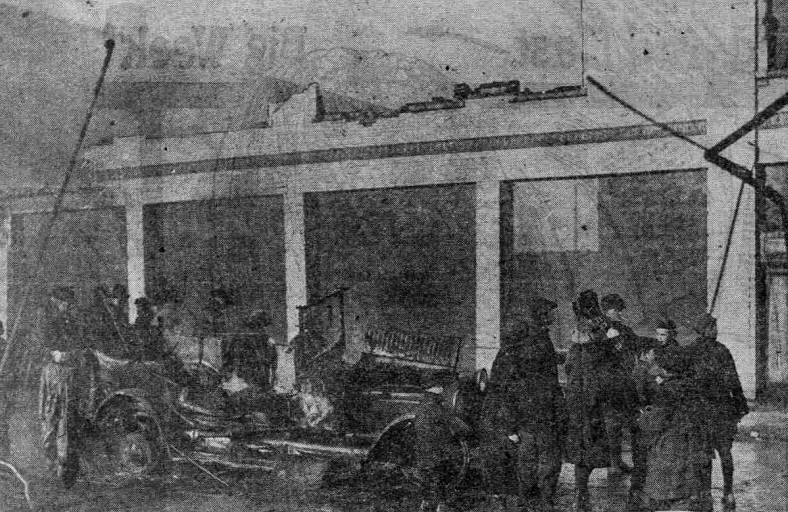
Remnants of the Astoria Furniture Company

At about 2 a.m. on December 8, 1922, a fire began which destroyed up to 30 blocks in central Astoria, Oregon. Approximately 2,500 residents lost their homes, with one death, and damages exceeded hundreds of millions of dollars. The fire is considered to be one of the worst in Oregon's history.

A 1922 report attributed:

... the rapid spread of the fire had been caused by flames eating their way beneath the paved streets, attacking the creosoted pilings which provide the support for the pavement. To this honeycomb ... is attributed the amazing speed with which the flames traveled, breaking through in myriad places.

Astoria had major fires in July 1883 and December 16, 2010.
