= Columbia River Maritime Museum =

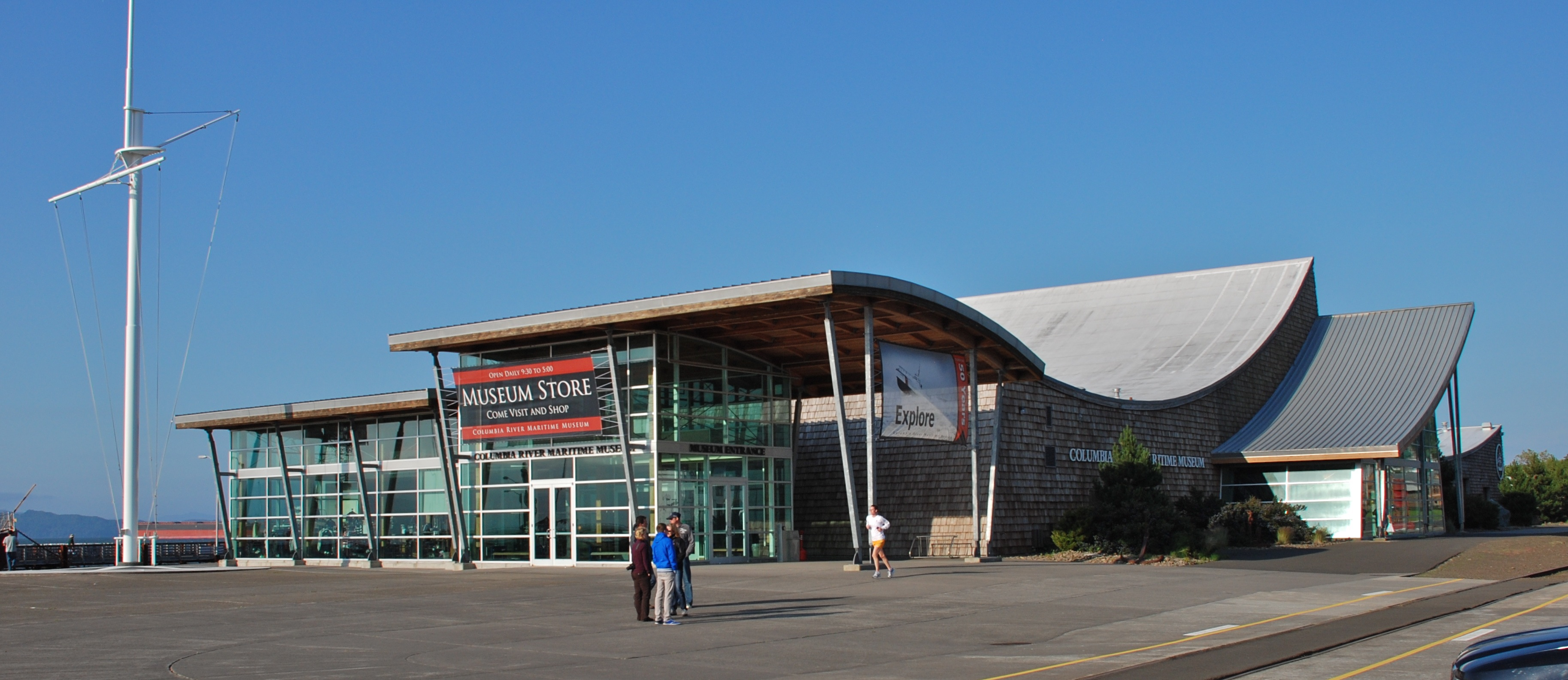
- View from southwest in 2012
- Established: Association: 1962; Museum: 1963
- Location: Astoria, Oregon, U.S.
- Coordinates: 46.19°N 123.824°W
- Type: Maritime museum
- Collection size: 30,000 objects
- Visitors: Approx. 100,000 (annually)
- Website: crmm.org

The Columbia River Maritime Museum is a museum of maritime history in the northwest United States, located about ten miles (16 km) southeast of the mouth of the Columbia River in Astoria, Oregon.

It has a national reputation for the quality of its exhibits and the scope of its collections and was the first museum in Oregon to meet national accreditation standards. The museum is accredited by the American Alliance of Museums. It is the official state maritime museum for Oregon.

The museum opened 63 years ago in August 1963 in the Old Astoria City Hall and in 1982 it moved to its current location, on the waterfront. A remodeling and expansion was undertaken in 2001–02.

== History ==
The Columbia River Maritime Museum Association was founded in 1962 by Rolf Klep, a commercial artist and avid marine artifact collector. After a public fundraising campaign, the group acquired the Old Astoria City Hall from the Oregon Military Department, to house the new museum. The association named its first museum director in January 1963, and the Columbia River Maritime Museum opened to the public in August 1963, in the former city hall, at 1618 Exchange Street.

In the early 1970s, a new fundraising campaign was launched for a planned move to a newly constructed, larger facility on the city's waterfront. As well as providing more space for the growing collection of artifacts, the move would allow the museum's buildings to be adjacent to some of the historic ships moored in Astoria, such as the Lightship Columbia. Construction of the new facilities began in May 1975 and cost $2.75 million. The museum moved to its new waterfront site in May 1982. The new building provided 37,000 square feet (3,440 m^{2}) of space, on a 2.5-acre (1.0 ha) site.

=== 2001–02 expansion ===
The museum's 40th anniversary and a $6 million remodeling and expansion project were celebrated May 11, 2002. The renovation increased exhibit space to 44,200 square feet (4,110 m^{2}) and now houses interactive historical exhibits and museum acquisitions. Visitors may experience what it is like to pilot a tugboat, participate in a Coast Guard rescue on the Columbia River Bar, and live in Astoria during the height of salmon fishing. Huge windows make the Columbia River a living backdrop for exhibits that are interactive and touchable, many accompanied by interviews with people involved in the events depicted.

The Columbia River Maritime Museum collects and exhibits maritime artifacts from the Columbia River and the Pacific Northwest. The Museum's all-donation collection exceeds 30,000 objects, 20,000 photographs, and a 10,000-volume research library.

== Collections ==
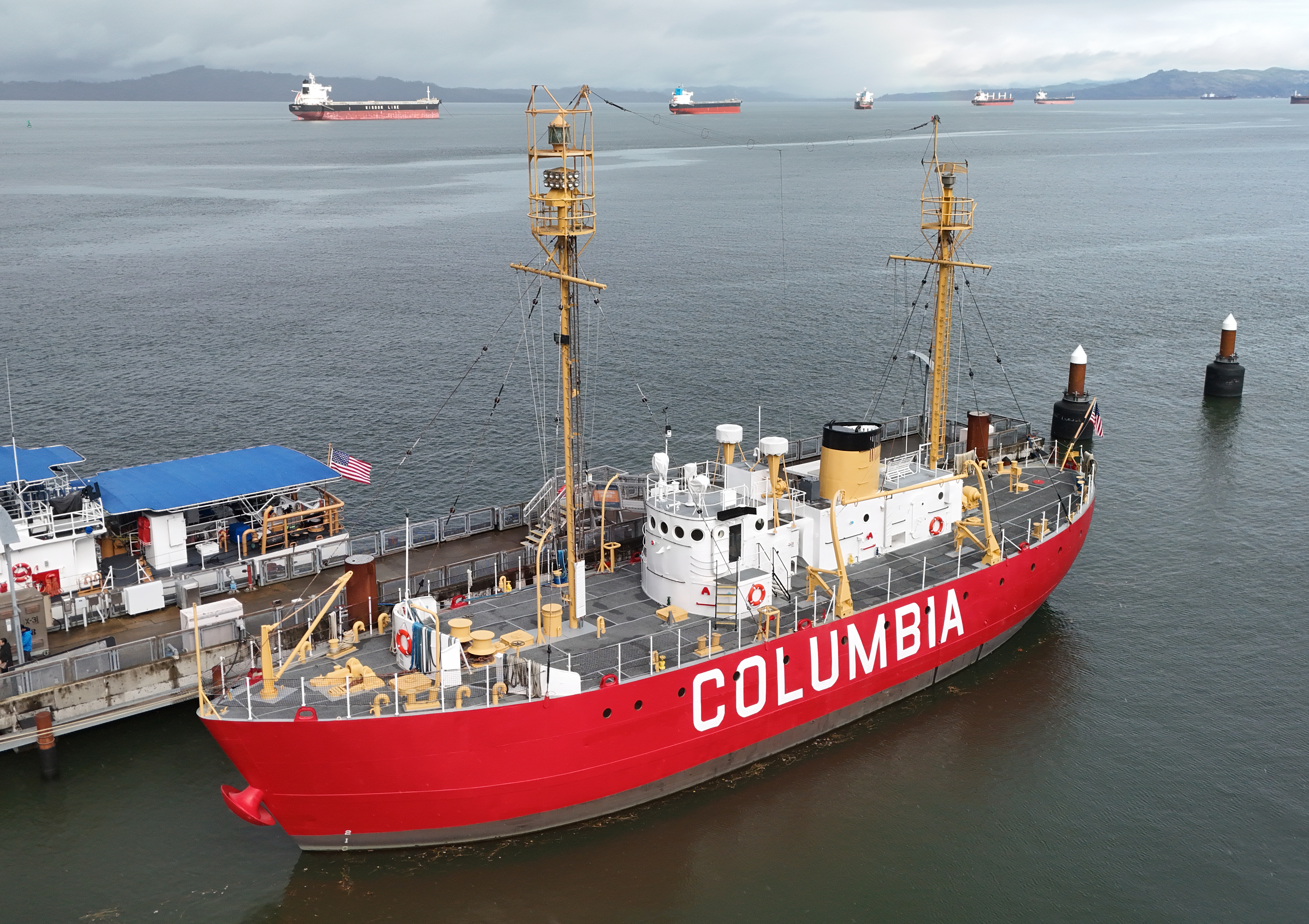
The Lightship Columbia

- The bridge of the WWII era Destroyer USS Knapp
- U.S. Coast Guard 44-foot motor lifeboat CG-44300
- U.S. Coast Guard 36-foot motor lifeboat CG-36474
- 32-foot troller Darle
- Two gillnetter vessels
- The Lightship Columbia, WLV-604
- Sai-shou Maru, a boat from Japan which crossed the Pacific Ocean after being dislodged from its mooring during the 2011 Tōhoku earthquake and tsunami
- The Bar Pilot boat, Peacock
- Third order Fresnel Lens

Maritime collections include models, full-size watercraft, paintings, figureheads, and all manner of gear, wardrobe, weapons, instruments employed in commercial, private and military maritime operations. An orientation film, The Great River of the West, shows the bar pilots working the dangerous Columbia River Bar.

== Barbey Maritime Center ==
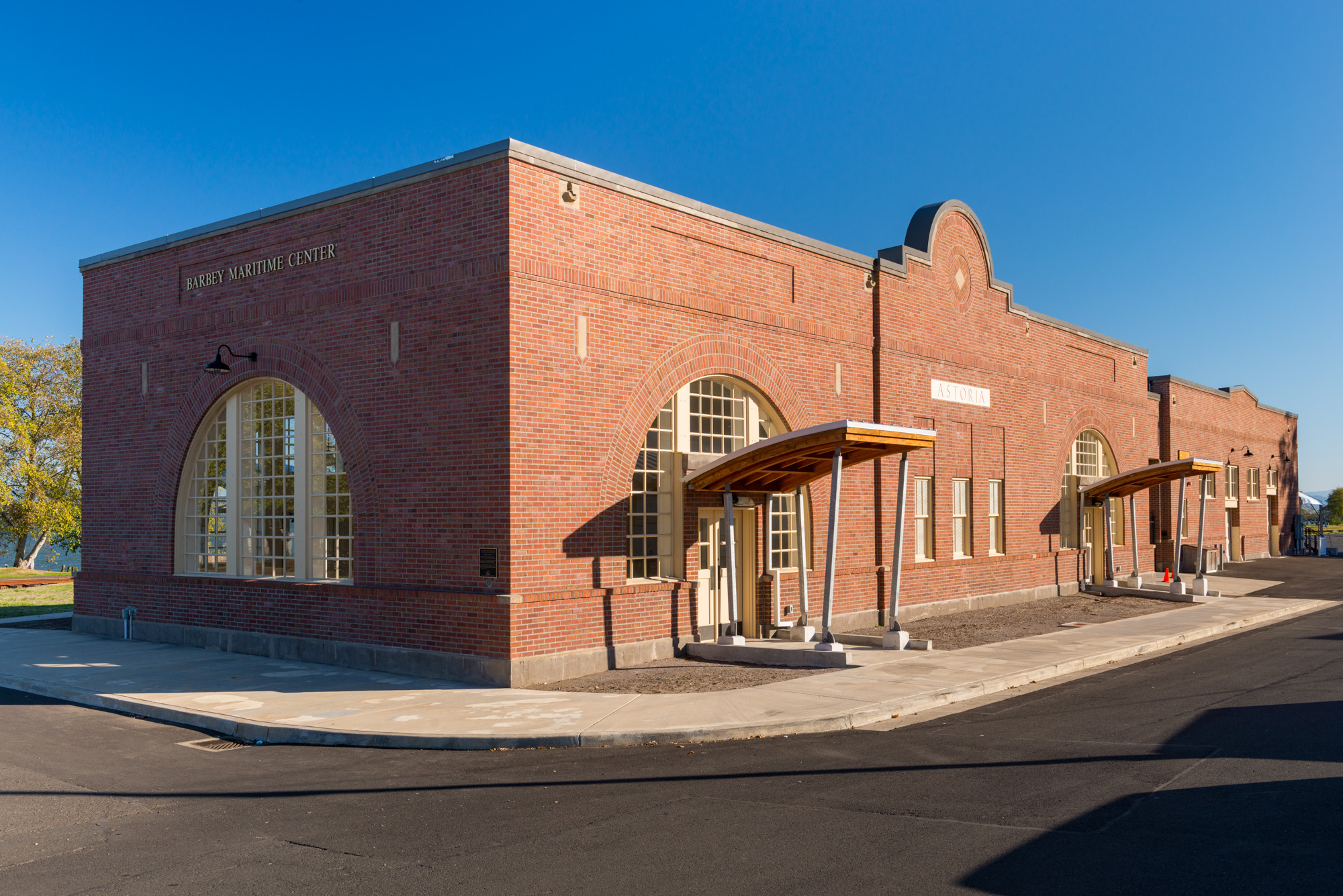
The Barbey Maritime Center in 2015

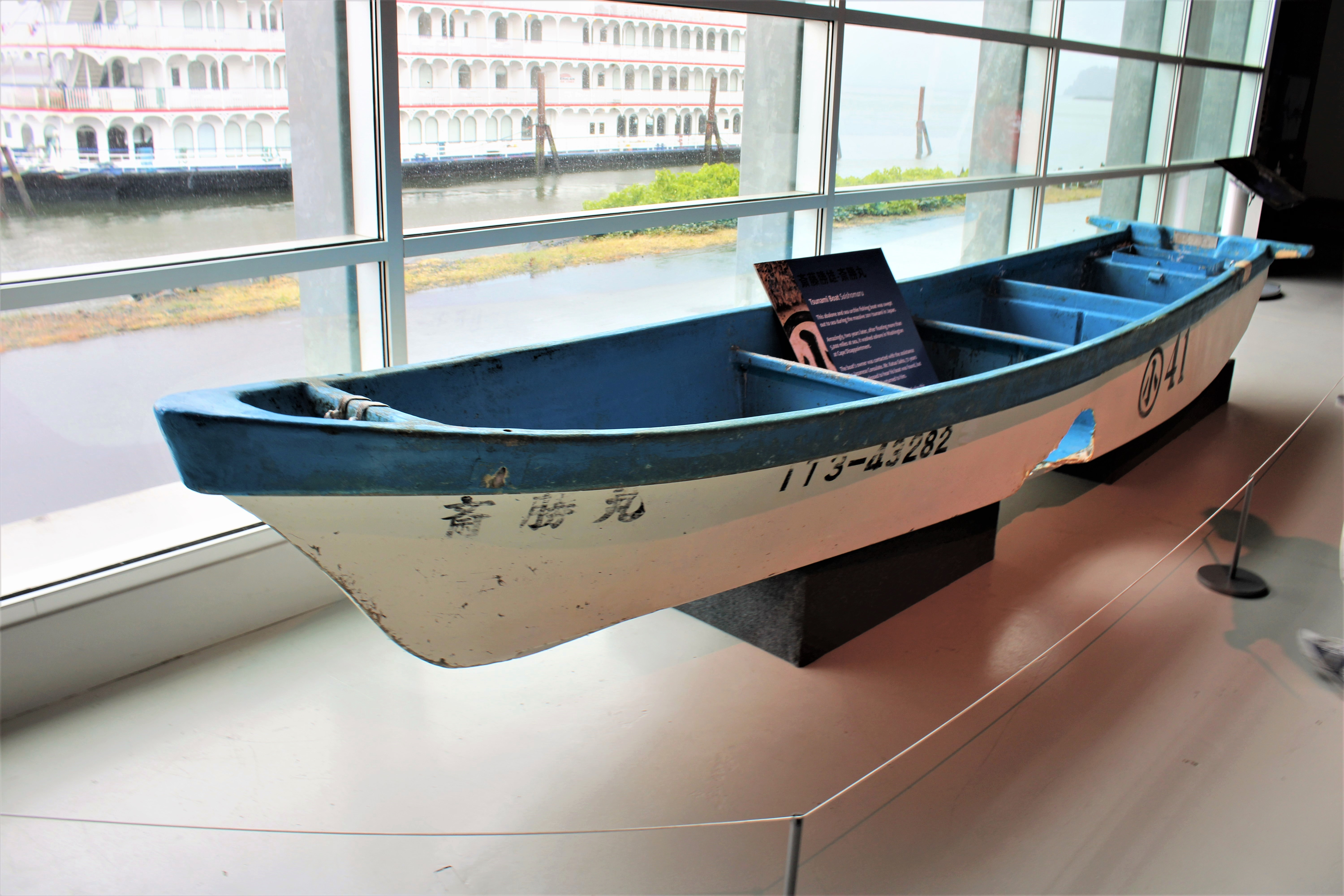
2011 Japanese Tsunami Boat

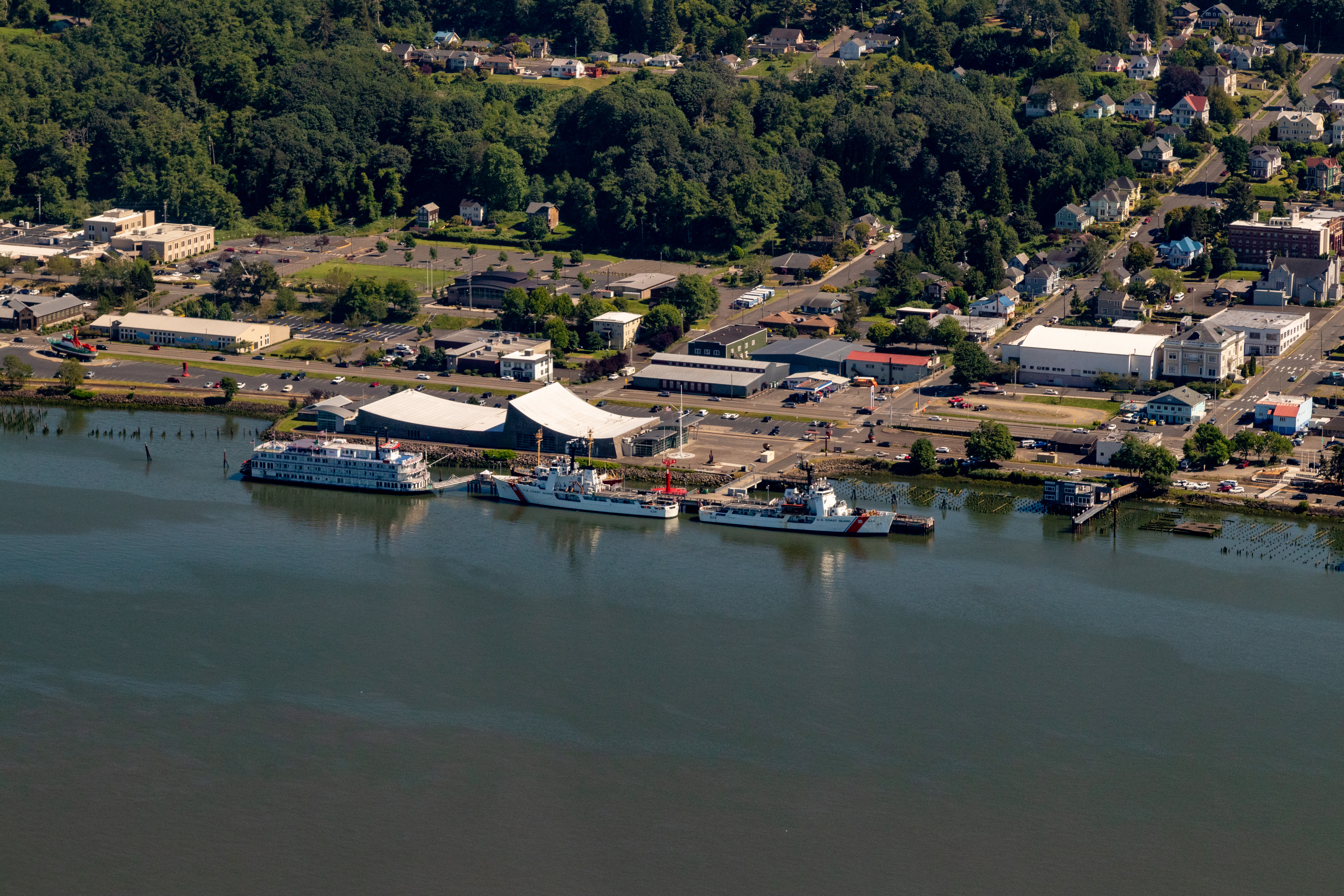
Maritime Museum

A recent addition to CRMM is the Barbey Maritime Center for Research and Industry, which opened in January 2013. It is located in the Astoria Railroad Depot, a former train station located about 600 feet (180 metres) east of the main museum. The 6,000-square-foot (560 m^{2}) structure was designed by architect Thomas D'Arcy McMahon, built in 1925 for the Spokane, Portland & Seattle Railway (SP&S), and was served regularly by passenger trains until 1952. SP&S successor Burlington Northern donated the brick building to the maritime museum in 1987. The city's Historic Landmarks Commission designated the building as historic in 1988. However, the facility continued to be largely unused for many years, and by 2011 it had "fallen into disrepair", as well as incurring minor earthquake damage in 2001. In 2011, plans for its renovation and use began taking shape. Work started in June 2012 and was scheduled to include ADA-related accessibility modifications, seismic retrofits and restoration of historic doors and windows, among other changes. The museum plans to use part of the building for constructing boats, and Clatsop Community College expects to use it as a work space for its classes about historic preservation.

A dedication ceremony for the Barbey Maritime Center was held on January 25, 2013. The center is focused on boatbuilding and its associated local history and is open daily to the public. Various classes and demonstrations were planned to be offered, including actual boat building. The center was named in honor of the Barbey family, pioneers in the local fish packing industry and operator of the last fish cannery in Astoria.

== See also ==
- List of maritime museums in the United States
- List of museum ships
