= Stanley Paul Young =

American biologist (1889–1969)

Stanley Paul Young (October 31, 1889 – May 15, 1969) was an American biologist who spent forty-two years working for the U.S. government in several departments which dealt with wildlife management and research. Also known as an author and ecologist, his primary interests were the predatory mammals of the American West: the wolf, coyote, puma or cougar, and bobcat.

== Early life and education ==
Young was born in Astoria, Oregon, to Benjamin and Christine (née Svenson) Young. He attended the University of Oregon, graduating with a BA in mining engineering in 1911. After working for three years as a mining engineer, he decided to change careers and enrolled at the University of Michigan, earning a master's degree in biology. In an interview in 1961, Young said, "As a boy I earned pin money trapping coon and mink near the mouth of the Columbia. I had a deep interest in animal life. It was this interest that made me decide to become a biologist."

== Career ==
In 1917, Young was hired as a ranger by the U. S. Forest Service in Arizona; a few months later he was working as a hunter of predatory mammals for the Bureau of Biological Survey. (Note: At one point, he crossed the border into Mexico and was captured and held by Pancho Villa for a week before being rescued.) Young continued to work in predatory animal control in the West until 1927, when he moved to Washington, D.C., to become the assistant head of the Division of Predatory Animal and Rodent Control. Young held a number of positions in the Biological Survey. When the Survey was transferred to the Department of Interior in 1939, Young was made senior biologist in the Branch of Wildlife Research, and devoted his career to research.

In 1957, Young was named Director of the Bird and Mammal Laboratories, where he remained until his retirement in 1959. The Department of the Interior awarded him its Distinguished Service Award, the highest honor the agency can bestow.

== Bibliography ==
- Young, Stanley P.; Goldman, Edward A. (1944). The Wolves of North America. Washington, D.C.: The American Wildlife Institute.
- ——; —— (1946). The Puma, Mysterious American Cat. Washington, D.C.: The American Wildlife Institute.
- —— (1946). Sketches of American Wildlife. Baltimore: Monumental Press.
- —— (1946). The Wolf in North American History. Caldwell, Idaho: The Caxton Printers, Ltd.
- ——; Jackson, Hartley H. T. (1978) [Reprint of 1951 ed.]. The Clever Coyote. Lincoln: University of Nebraska Press.
- —— (1978) [Reprint of 1958 ed.]. The Bobcat of North America. Lincoln: University of Nebraska Press.
- —— (1970). The Last of the Loners. New York: Macmillan.

== Sources ==
- "Stanley Paul Young Papers". Smithsonian Institution Archives.
- Tims, Marvin (June 11, 1961). "UO Grad of 1911 Visits Campus". The Eugene Guard. Eugene, Oregon.
