= Shanghaied in Astoria =

Musical melodrama

Shanghaied In Astoria is a musical melodrama that is performed by the Astor Street Opry Company every summer in Astoria, Oregon, United States. It has run since 1984, and has been attended by over 100,000 people. Traditionally the play is performed three to four days a week throughout the summer. It is recommended by a leading travel guide.

The unpaid cast draws from locals, some which are well known, such as the Clatsop County District attorney who plays a bit part as sheriff.

As of August 10, 2023, the show is in its 39th season.

== Summary ==
The story is set in 1900 or 1910 Astoria around the Scandinavian Midsummer Festival. The story is about Eric Olson and his friends Jakko and Eino. Jakko and Eino want to marry Eric's four sisters. Max Krooke, Eric's boss, desires money and wealth. He sends his ambitious henchman, Sneake, to kidnap Eric in an attempt to secure the wealth of Virginia Sweet, Eric's girlfriend. Sneake brings Eric to Lascivious Vivian's saloon, where he sees can-can dancers for the first time. Eric is then taken on a boat by Pat and Mike, two Irish sailors, who also want to marry Eric's sisters. Jakko and Eino rescue Eric through a dance-off. In the end, everyone lives happily ever after except Krooke who goes to jail.
