= Astoria City Hall =

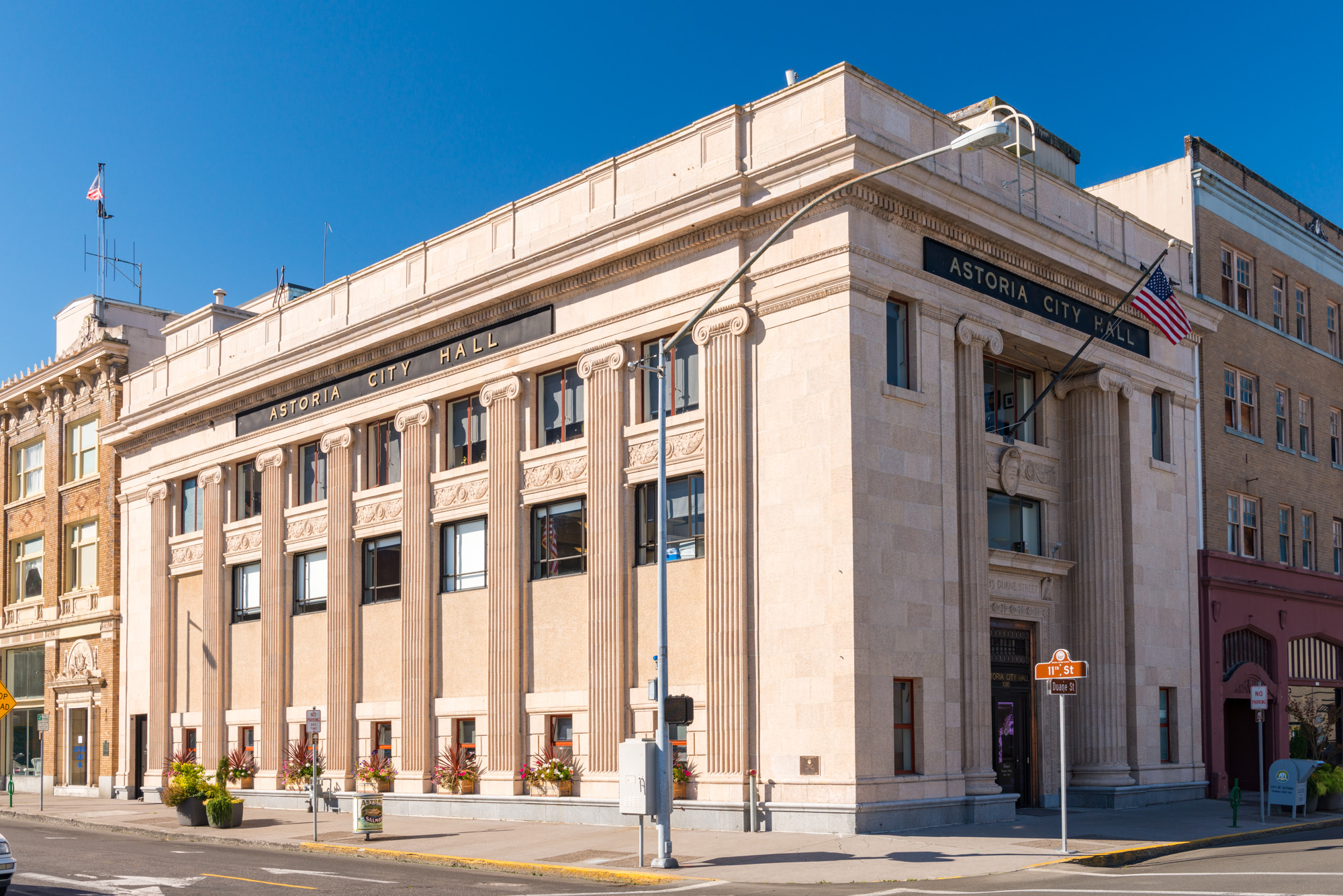
- Astoria City Hall in 2015
- Former names: Astoria Savings Bank

General information
- Type: City hall
- Architectural style: Neoclassical
- Location: 1095 Duane Street; Astoria, Oregon (in Clatsop County), United States
- Completed: 1923
- Owner: City of Astoria

Technical details
- Floor area: 17,000 square feet (1,600 m^{2})

Design and construction
- Architects: John Virginius Bennes; John Hedstrom (builder)
- Astoria Savings Bank
- U.S. Historic district – Contributing property
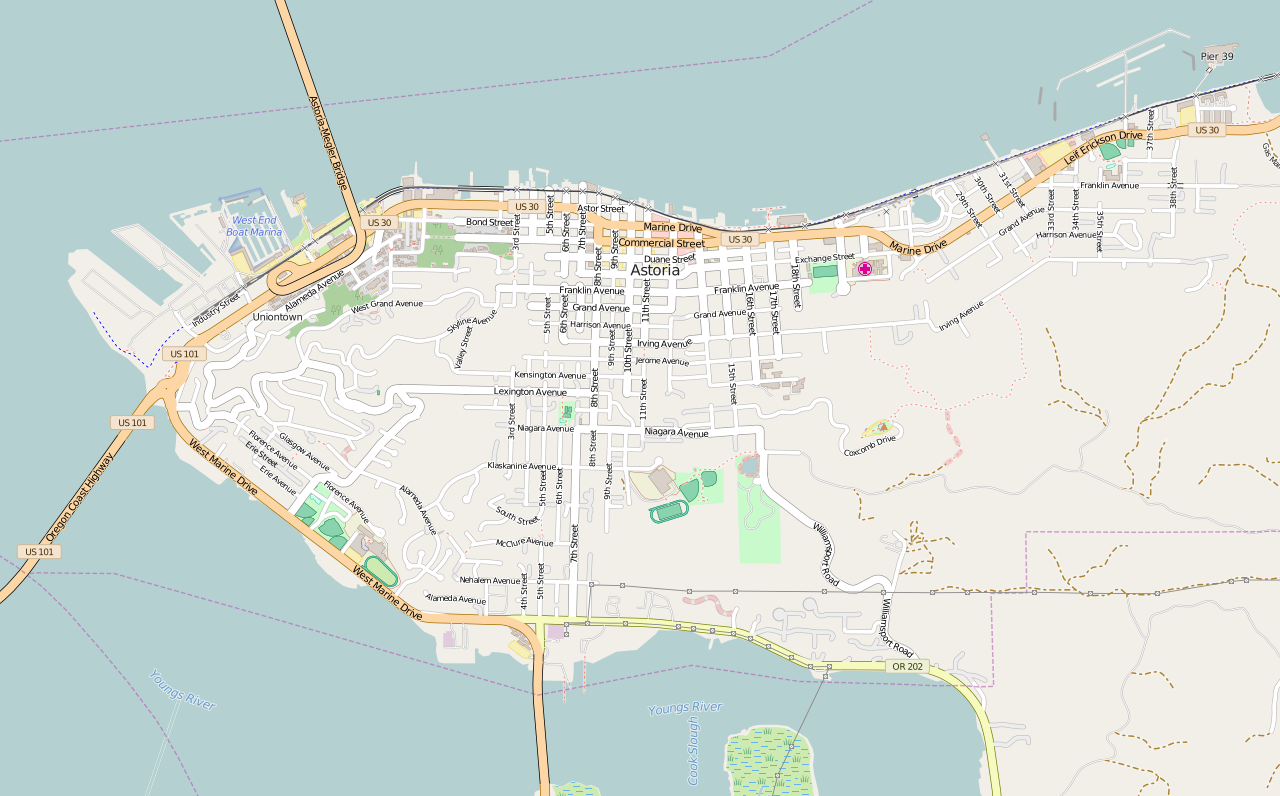
- Location within Astoria OR
- Coordinates: 46°11′17.3″N 123°49′55″W
- Part of: Astoria Downtown Historic District (ID98000631)
- Designated CP: June 22, 1998

Astoria City Hall is the current city hall for the town of Astoria, Oregon, United States. Built in 1923 to house a bank, the building became the city hall in 1939, and it has remained Astoria's seat of government for more than 80 years.

== History ==
The three-story building was constructed in 1923, as the Astoria Savings Bank, to replace that bank's previous building on the same site, destroyed by fire. The bank went out of business in 1929, as a result of the stock-market crash of that year. Clatsop County acquired the building in 1936, and in 1938 the city of Astoria used a Public Works Administration grant to fund the conversion of the building into a new city hall, to replace the Old Astoria City Hall, built in 1904–05. The city offices, as well as those of the Astoria School District, moved into the new city hall at the end of March 1939. The move put Astoria's city hall in downtown, an improvement in public access over the "isolated" previous location at the edge of downtown.

A major modification made in the 1970s was the addition of a second floor, through extension of a mezzanine level. That addition was a new "middle floor", between the original two floors. The city council chambers are located on that second floor, and what then became the third floor is occupied by most of the city staff's offices.

In 1998, the building was designated a contributing property in the Astoria Downtown Historic District, which was listed on the National Register of Historic Places on June 22 of that year.

== 2011 remodeling ==
The building's north end, now the location of the public entrance

A $1.2 million remodeling of the building began in late summer 2011 and was completed in April 2012. During the work, the city offices were temporarily moved to space at the Astoria Yacht Club.

Along with restoration of the building's entrance and open lobby, the work included the addition of fire sprinklers and other safety and lighting improvements. Installation of a new, ADA-compliant elevator was also included in the project, replacing a small, non-compliant elevator. The council chambers were changed from an L-shape, which had made it difficult for people in part of the room to see and hear the activities, to a square shape, expanding the room's capacity from around 60 people to around 80. The chambers were also reoriented to face the Columbia River (north). Windows along that portion of the building's east side, formerly used for a staff lounge, were made part of the council room.

The old bank vaults are still in place, their locks disabled, and the 2011 remodeling included refitting one of them as an office and copy room. Certain period features were restored. These included the return, from the Flavel House Museum, of a vintage chandelier in the lobby. It had adorned that space during the building's years as a bank and remained until 1949, but had hung in the music room of the Flavel museum since then.
