= Astoria High School (Oregon) =

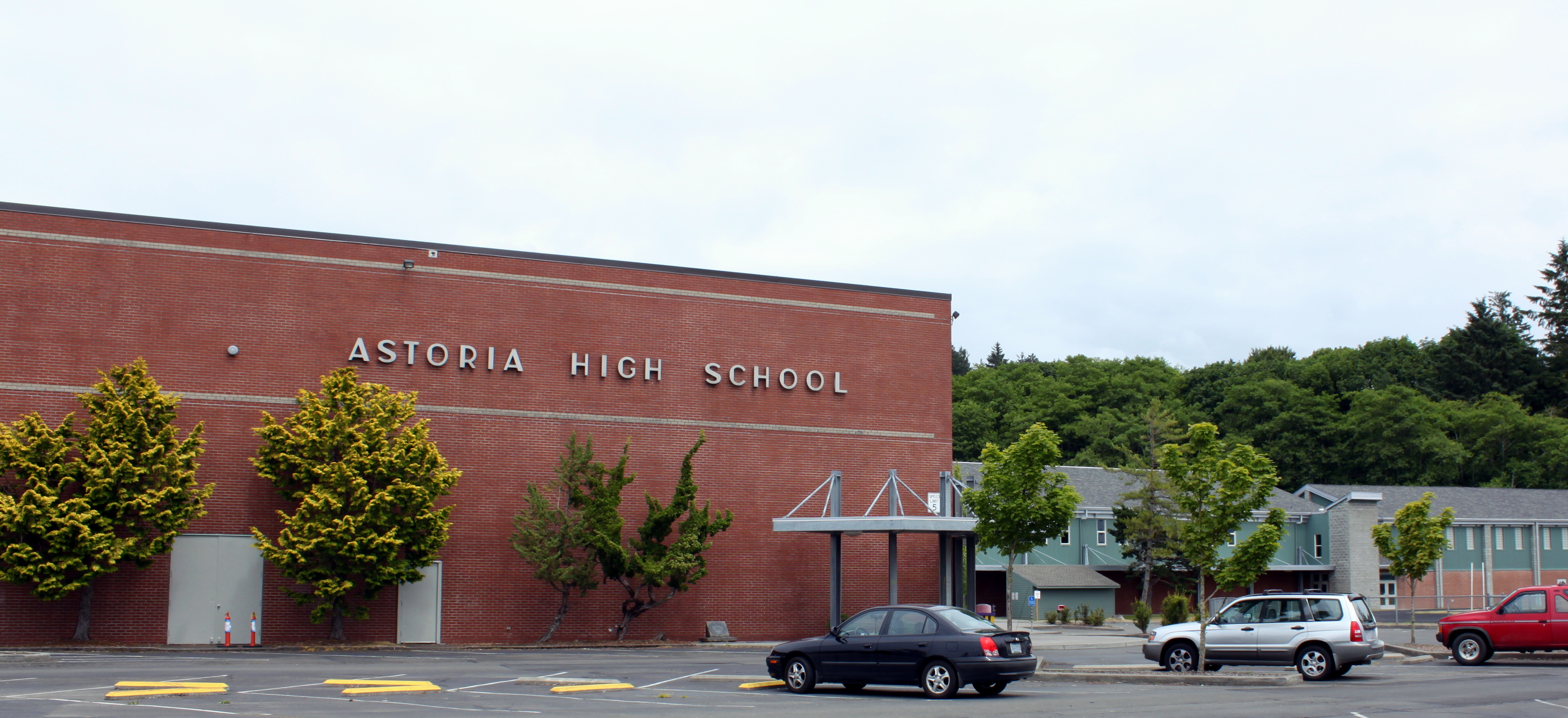

Location
- 1001 West Marine Drive; Astoria, (Clatsop County), Oregon 97103; United States; 46.17622°N 123.84848°W

Information
- Type: Public
- School district: Astoria School District
- Principal: Lynn Jackson
- Teaching staff: 35.85 (FTE)
- Grades: 9–12
- Enrollment: 641 (2023-2024)
- Student to teacher ratio: 17.88
- Colors: Purple and Gold
- Athletics conference: OSAA 4A-1 Cowapa League
- Mascot: Fighting Fisherman
- Team name: Fishermen
- Rival: Seaside High School
- Website: ahs.astoria.k12.or.us

Astoria High School is the only public high school located in Astoria, Oregon. A part of the Astoria School District, it is located on the edge of Youngs Bay, on the south side of town.

In addition to Astoria, the district (of which this is the sole comprehensive high school) includes Jeffers Gardens and River Point.

== Academics ==
In 2022, 82% of the school's seniors received a high school diploma. Of 139 students, 121 graduated and 18 dropped out.

Astoria High School offers two Advanced Placement (AP) courses and 19 opportunities for college credit through both Clatsop Community College and Tillamook Bay Community College.

== Athletics ==
Astoria High School athletic teams compete in the OSAA 4A-1 Cowapa League. The athletic director is Howard Rub and the athletics secretary is Angie Harrington.

State Championships:

- Baseball: 2006, 2009, 2011
- Boys Basketball: 1930, 1932, 1934, 1935, 1941, 1942, 1998
- Boys Cross Country: 1990, 1992
- Dance/Drill: 1991, 1993, 2005, 2015, 2024, 2025, 2026
- Football: 2008
- Girls Golf: 1977
- Girls Track and Field: 1981, 2015, 2016, 2017
- Softball: 2025

== Notable alumni ==
- Maila Nurmi, actress and television personality who created the 1950s character Vampira. Class of 1940.
- Jordan Poyer, is an American football free safety for the Miami Dolphins of the National Football League as of 2024. Class of 2009.
