= Nebeker =

Nebeker is a surname. Notable people with the surname include:

- Aquila Nebeker (1859–1933), American politician, president of the Utah Senate
- Chase Nebeker Peterson (1929–2014), American physician and university administrator
- Enos H. Nebeker (1836-1913), American banker and politician
- Frank Q. Nebeker (1930-2024), American judge
- Royal Nebeker (1945–2014), American painter and print maker
