= Bradley State Scenic Viewpoint =

State park in Oregon

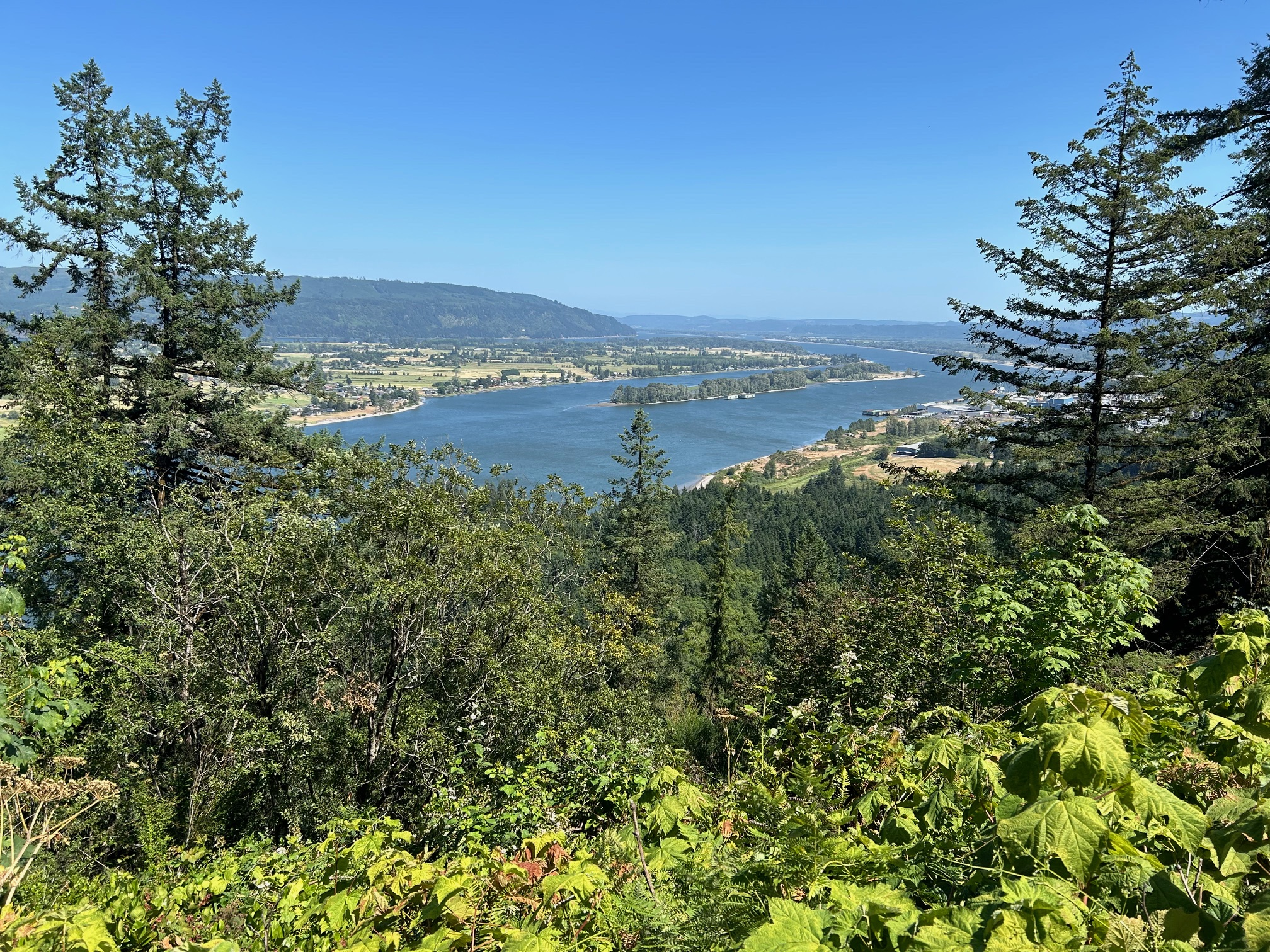
- View of Puget Island and Wauna from Bradley SSV

- Location within Oregon Location within the United States
- Interactive map of Bradley State Scenic Viewpoint
- Type: Public, state
- Location: Clatsop County, Oregon
- Nearest city: Cathlamet, Washington
- Coordinates: 46°10′15″N 123°26′12″W
- Operator: Oregon Parks and Recreation Department

Bradley State Scenic Viewpoint is a state park in the U.S. state of Oregon, administered by the Oregon Parks and Recreation Department. It is located directly north of U.S. Route 30 between Astoria and Portland.

== History ==
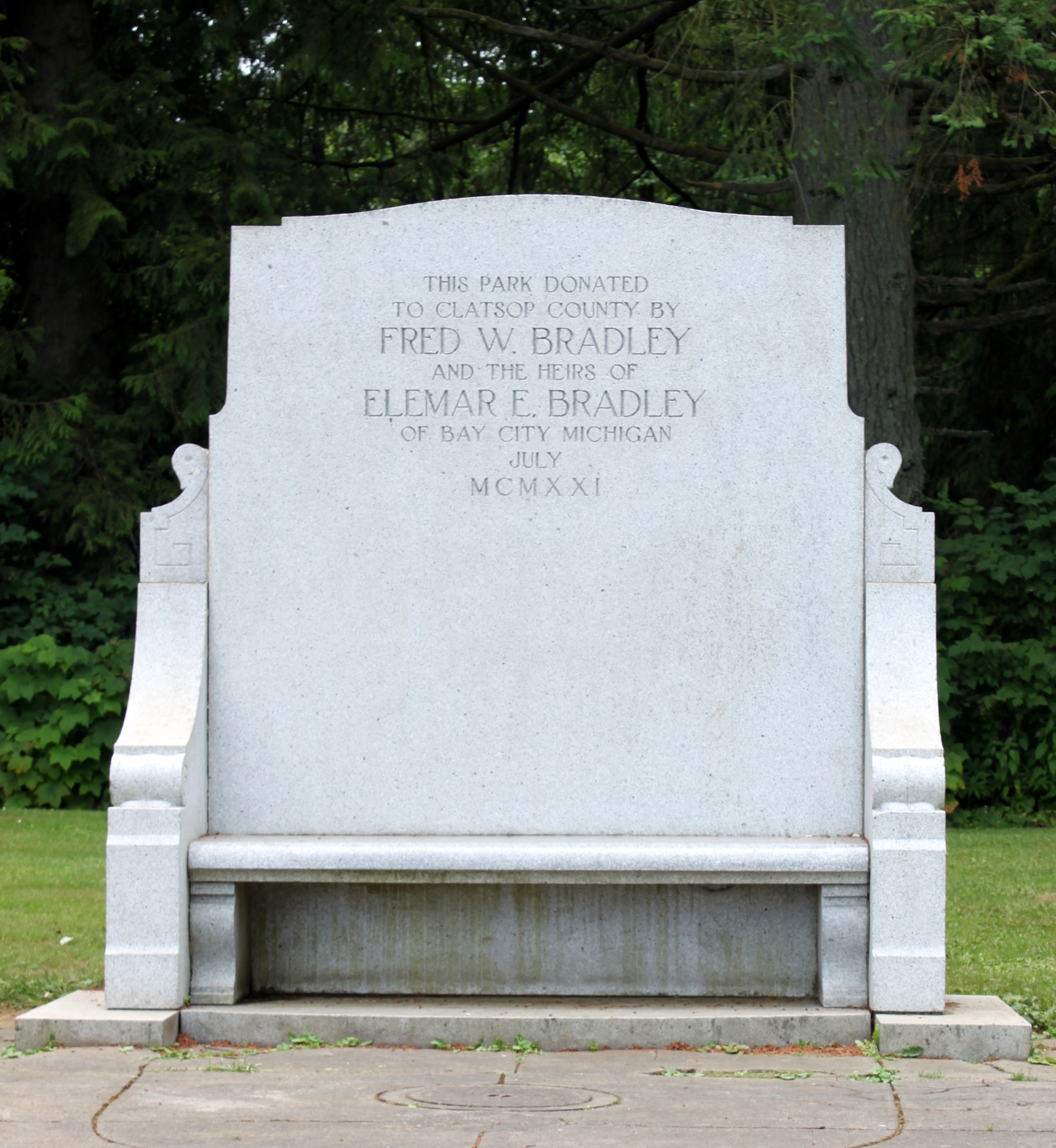
Dedication bench

The land that now makes up Bradley State Scenic Viewpoint was donated to Clatsop County in 1921 by Fred W. Bradley and the other heirs of the estate of Elmar E. Bradley. The Bradley family owned most of the land in the area at the time. In March of the next year, the Oregon Highway Division (now Oregon Department of Transportation) took control of the site, although the deed was not officially signed until 1932.

The site was soon developed into a rest area, and was originally known as Bradley Wayside. Parking areas, picnic benches, and restrooms were added as well as a water system using a source approximately two miles west. The highway at the time went directly through the park, but was reconstructed in the 1960s and bypassed the park to the south. Entrance to the park is now via an entry road.

A concessionaire operated the park in its early years, and the contract was extended multiple times, before eventually being cancelled due to neither the state nor the concessionaire being fully satisfied.

== Amenities ==
The park is for day-use only. It features flush restrooms, a drinking fountain, multiple picnic tables, and a memorial bench. Grassy areas also allow room for pets and games.

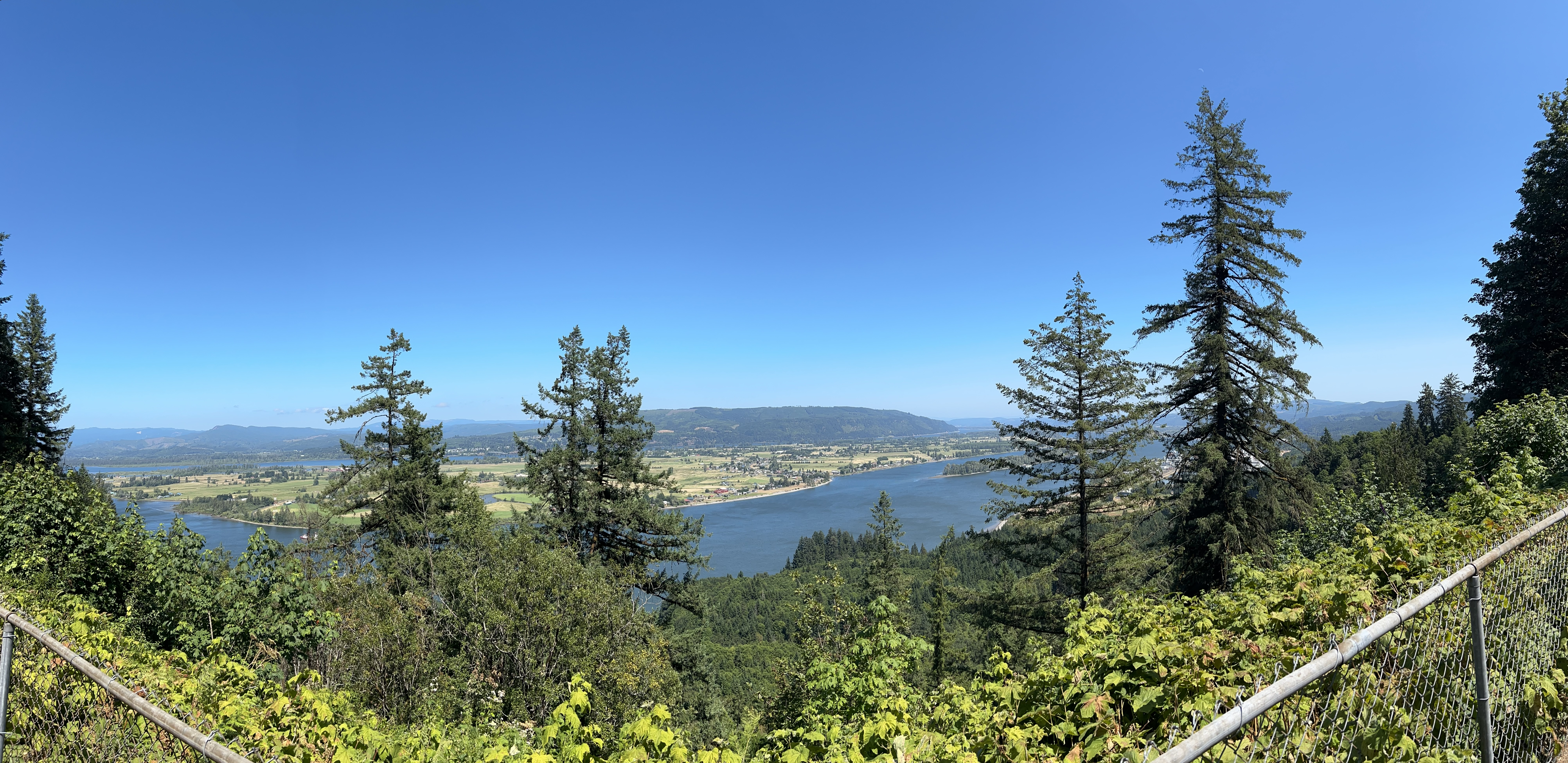
The view from Bradley State Scenic Viewpoint. Puget Island in the middle with the Columbia River. Cathlamet, Washington can be seen center-left and Wauna, Oregon center-right.

== See also ==
- List of Oregon state parks
