= Jeffers Garden, Oregon =

Unincorporated community in the state of Oregon, United States

- Unincorporated community
- Location within Oregon Location within the United States
- Coordinates: 46°09′06″N 123°51′08″W
- Country: United States
- State: Oregon
- County: Clatsop

Area
  - Total: 0.565 sq mi (1.46 km^{2})
  - Land: 0.565 sq mi (1.46 km^{2})
  - Water: 0 sq mi (0 km^{2})
- Elevation: 10 ft (3.0 m)

Population (2010)
  - Total: 368
  - Density: 651/sq mi (251/km^{2})
- Time zone: UTC-8 (Pacific (PST))
  - Summer (DST): UTC-7 (PDT)
- ZIP code: 97103
- Area codes: 503 and 971
- GNIS feature ID: 2611736

Jeffers Garden is an unincorporated community and census-designated place (CDP) in Clatsop County, Oregon, United States. Its population was 368 as of the 2010 census.

Astoria Marine Construction Company a site on the National Register of Historic Places in Clatsop County, Oregon is in Jeffers Garden on the Lewis and Clark River and the Jeffers Slough. Due to its historical importance the site is on the National Register of Historic Places in Clatsop County, Oregon.

== Education ==
It is in the Astoria School District 1. The comprehensive high school of that district is Astoria High School.

Clatsop County is in the boundary of Clatsop Community College.
