= River Point, Oregon =

- Census-designated place
- Location within Oregon Location within the United States
- Coordinates: 46°08′36″N 123°48′15″W
- Country: United States
- State: Oregon
- County: Clatsop

Area
  - Total: 0.60 sq mi (1.56 km^{2})
  - Land: 0.52 sq mi (1.35 km^{2})
  - Water: 0.081 sq mi (0.21 km^{2})
- Elevation: 49 ft (15 m)

Population (2020)
  - Total: 397
  - Density: 762.6/sq mi (294.45/km^{2})
- Time zone: UTC-8 (Pacific (PST))
  - Summer (DST): UTC-7 (PDT)
- ZIP Code: 97103 (Astoria)
- Area codes: 503/971
- FIPS code: 41-62292
- GNIS feature ID: 2812873

River Point is an unincorporated community and census-designated place (CDP) in Clatsop County, Oregon, United States. It was first listed as a CDP prior to the 2020 census. As of the 2020 census, River Point had a population of 397.

The CDP is in northwestern Clatsop County, 4 miles (6 km) south of Astoria along Oregon Route 202, the Nehalem Highway. It sits on the land between two rivers, the Youngs River to the west and the Wallooskee River to the north, extending to their confluence. The Youngs River is a tidal waterway leading to Youngs Bay at Astoria and thence the Columbia River.

== Demographics ==
Historical population
Census	Pop.	Note	%±
2020	397		—
U.S. Decennial Census

== Education ==
It is in the Astoria School District 1. The comprehensive high school of that district is Astoria High School.

Clatsop County is in the boundary of Clatsop Community College.
