= Seaside High School (Oregon) =

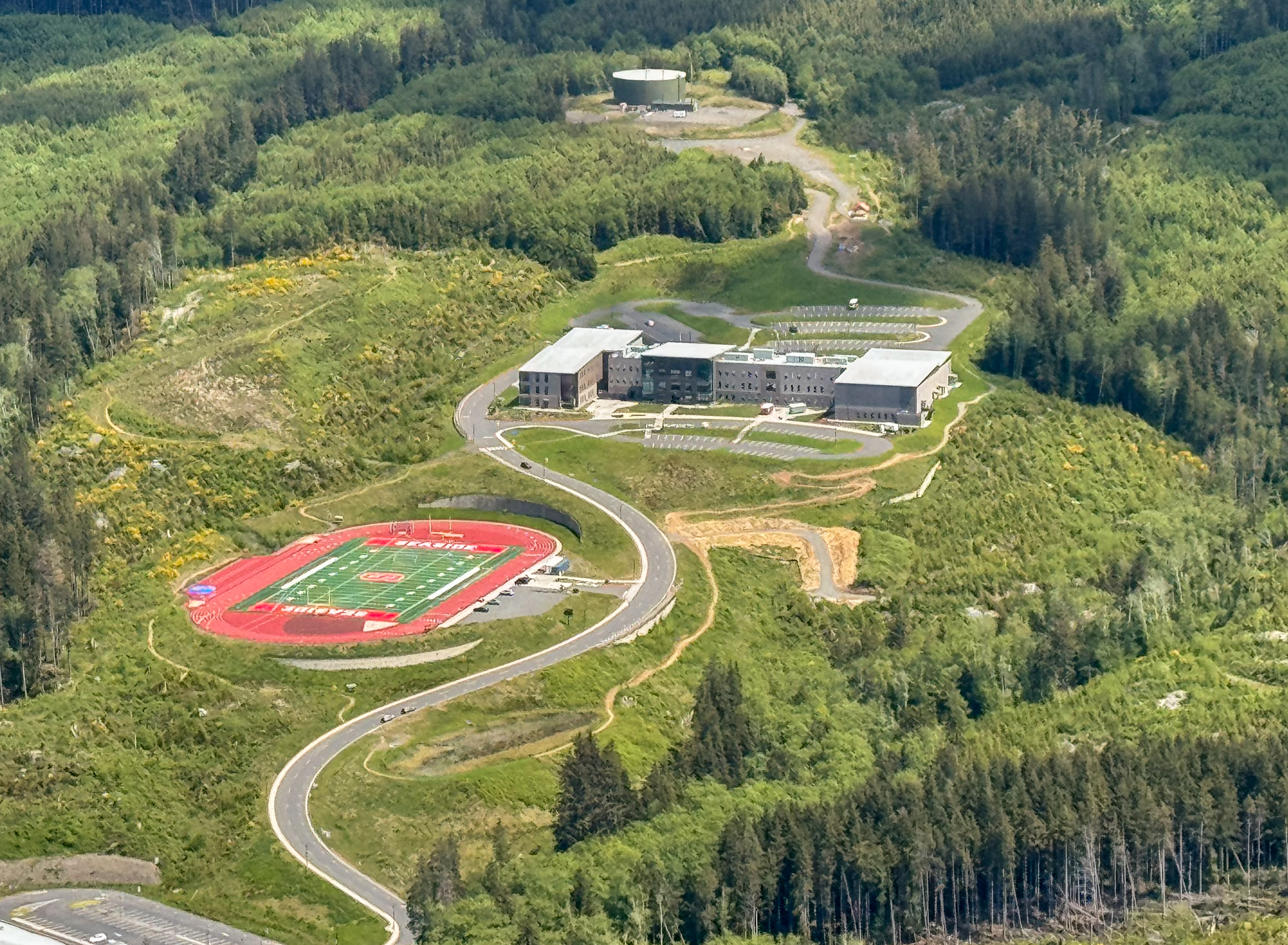
- Seaside High School, built in 2021 outside of a tsunami zone.

Location
- 2600 Spruce dr Seaside, Clatsop County, Oregon 97138; United States; 45.9867324°N 123.900505°W

Information
- Type: Public
- School district: Seaside School District
- Principal: Jeff Roberts
- Teaching staff: 27.50 (FTE)
- Grades: 9-12
- Enrollment: 462 (2023–2024)
- Student to teacher ratio: 16.80
- Colors: Red, white, and Columbia blue
- Athletics conference: OSAA Cowapa League 4A-1
- Mascot: Seagulls
- Rival: Astoria High School
- Website: https://shs.seaside.k12.or.us/

Seaside High School is a public high school in Seaside, Oregon, United States. It is a part of Seaside School District 10. In addition to Seaside, the district (of which this is the sole comprehensive high school) includes Cannon Beach and Gearhart.

A new combined middle and high school was completed in 2021, high up on a ridge, as the old school was in a tsunami zone.

== Academics ==
In 2008, 75% of the school's seniors received their high school diploma. Of 122 students, 92 graduated, 21 dropped out, 1 received a modified diploma, and 8 are still in high school.

In 2023, 77% of the school's seniors received their high school diploma. Of 117 students, 26 dropped out.

== Notable alumni ==
- Ben Archibald, CFL player for the Calgary Stampeders
- Karl Marlantes, author, Rhodes Scholar
