= Vesper, Oregon =

Unincorporated community in the state of Oregon, United States

- Unincorporated community
- Location within the state of Oregon
- Coordinates: 45°58′49″N 123°22′06″W
- Country: United States
- State: Oregon
- County: Clatsop
- Vesper: 1876
- Founder: Clatsop people (before establishment); William Johnston
- Named for: Hesperus
- Elevation: 486 ft (148 m)
- Time zone: UTC-8 (Pacific (PST))
  - Summer (DST): UTC-7 (PDT)
- ZIP code: 97138
- Area codes: 503 and 971

Vesper is an unincorporated community in Clatsop County, Oregon, United States. The Nehalem River flows through the town. Settled in 1876 by William Johnston, a man who would be responsible for the town's first post office and church, Vesper borders Jewell and the Columbia County line. Johnston also served as the town's first postmaster. Before 1901, Vesper was completely isolated from the rest of the county on land; for one to reach the community, it would have been necessary to travel via ferry on the Nehalem River. The county expanded wagon roads to the community, eventually leading to automobile roads being built in 1908. Nowadays, Oregon Route 202 passes through Vesper.

== History ==
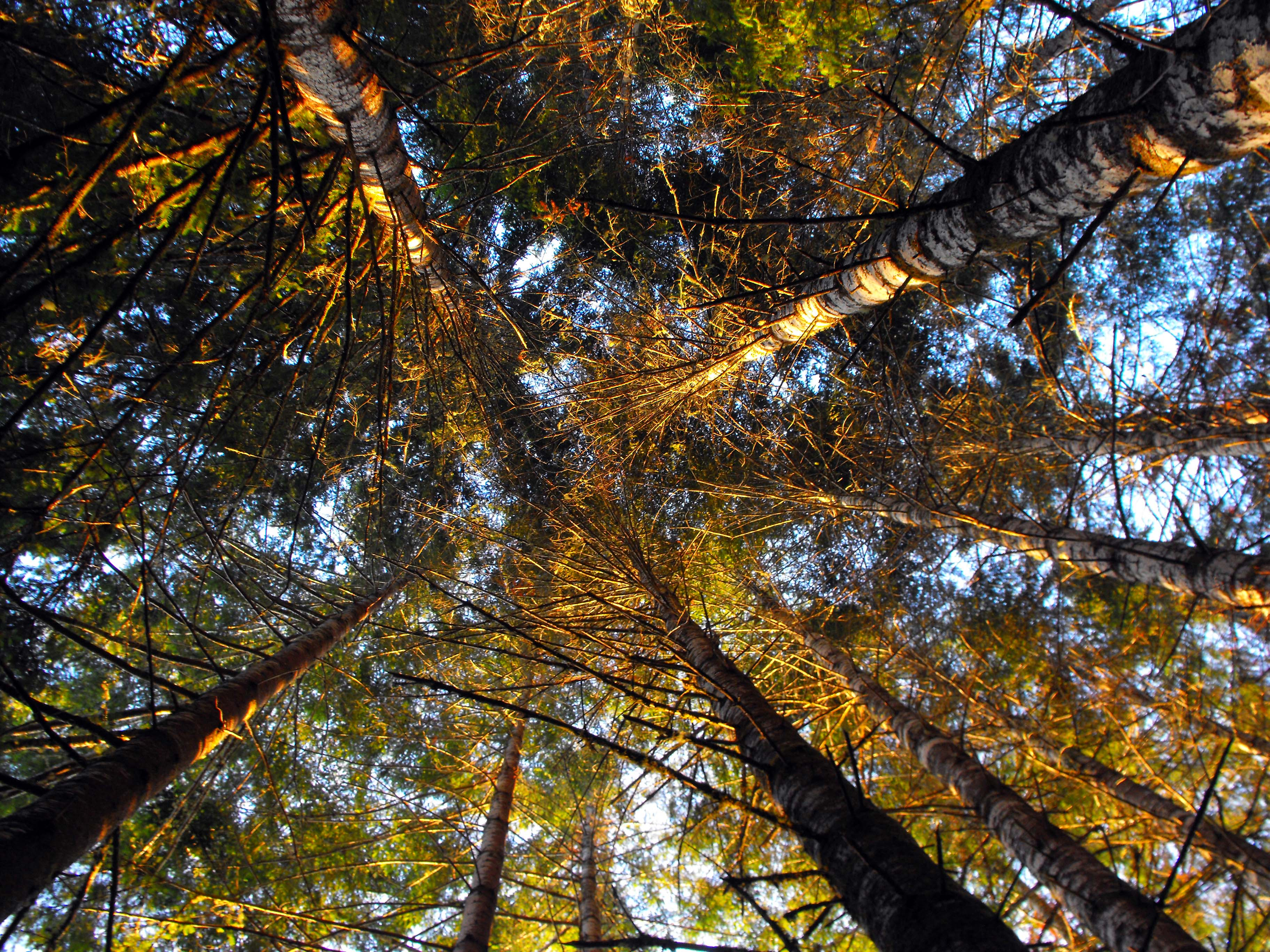
Trees near the Clatsop State Forest in Vesper.

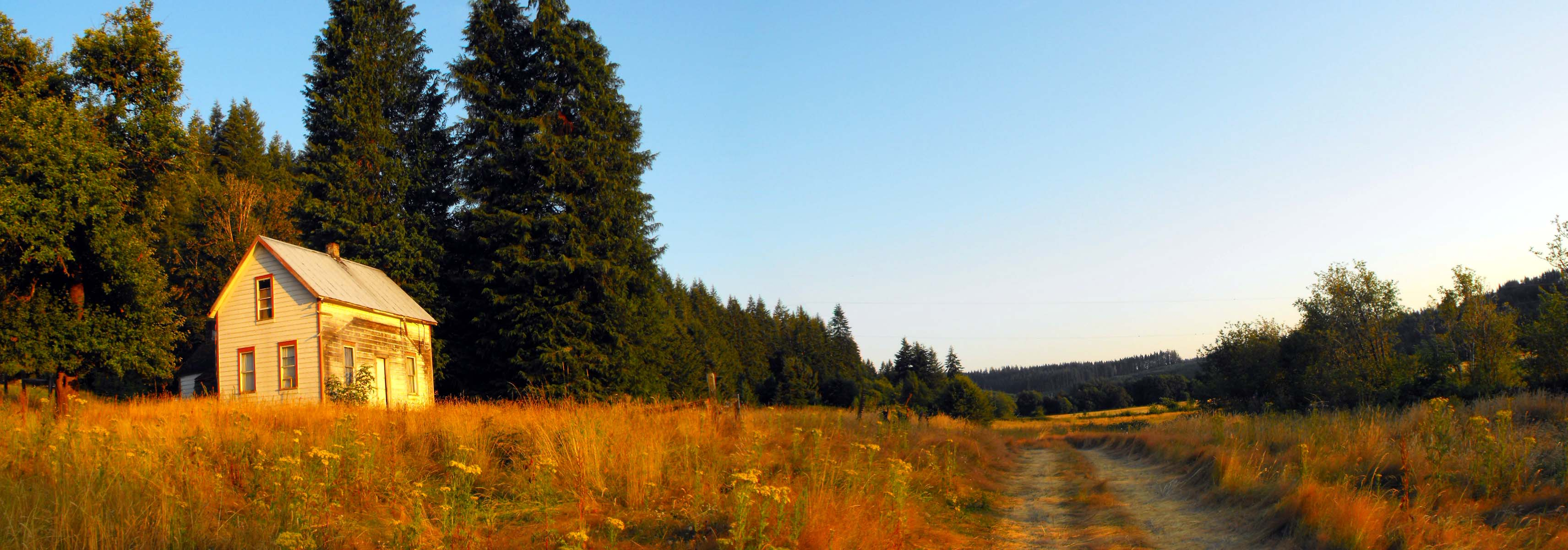
A Vesper farm house in 2009.

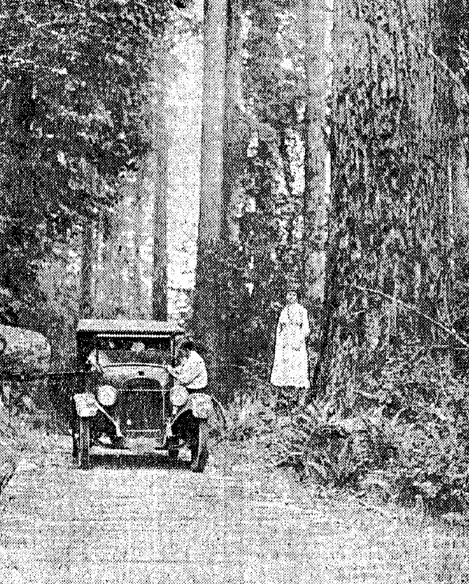
An early automobile road in Vesper.

=== Founding and name ===
Vesper was settled by William Johnston in 1876 with his family, who were from Ireland. The name Vesper is commonly applied to Hesperus, Greek mythology's personification for the planet Venus. The reason Johnston selected the name is unknown. Johnston established the first post office in Vesper during the Winter of 1879. He also served as the town's first postmaster. By 1895, E. A. Carl had taken over the reins as postmaster. Another contribution to the Vesper community by Johnston was the town's first church, which he built with his family. Lumber for the church was supplied by the local Douglas-fir trees. The congregation at Emmanuel Episcopal Church was still meeting at the church until the late-1980s. The church stands to this day.

=== Roads ===
The first wagon road connecting Astoria, Oregon with the Nehalem Valley, ending at Vesper was built in 1901. The road was 42 miles long. Those roads were restored often after that, including 1908, 1911, and 1914. The 1914 reconstruction was the most expensive highway project in the history of Clatsop County at the time with an estimated cost of $542,875. Vesper was host to an early automobile run from Portland, Oregon on July 15, 1915. The 129 mile tour took the duo on the run, Frank L. Parker and C. S. Brown, 13 hours.

The first bridge in Vesper, which spanned the Nehalem River, was built in 1914. Clatsop County approved the building of two additional bridges connecting Vesper and Jewell, Oregon three years later. The two steel bridges consisted of a single truss. Presently, Oregon Route 202 goes through the town of Vesper. Another notable road in the town is Old 77 Vesper Lane, which is a gravel road built alongside the Nehalem River.

=== Natural history and agriculture ===
Much of Vesper is forested timberland and agriculture. During the 1920s, a Vesper resident by the name of H. A. Scullen operated an apiary.
