= Lewis and Clark National Wildlife Refuge =

Wildlife refuge in Clatsop County, Oregon

- IUCN category IV (habitat/species management area)
- Location within the United States
- Location: Clatsop County, Oregon
- Nearest city: Astoria
- Coordinates: 46°12′59″N 123°38′04″W
- Area: 12,167 acres (4,924 ha)
- Established: 1972
- Governing body: U.S. Fish and Wildlife Service
- Website: Lewis and Clark NWR

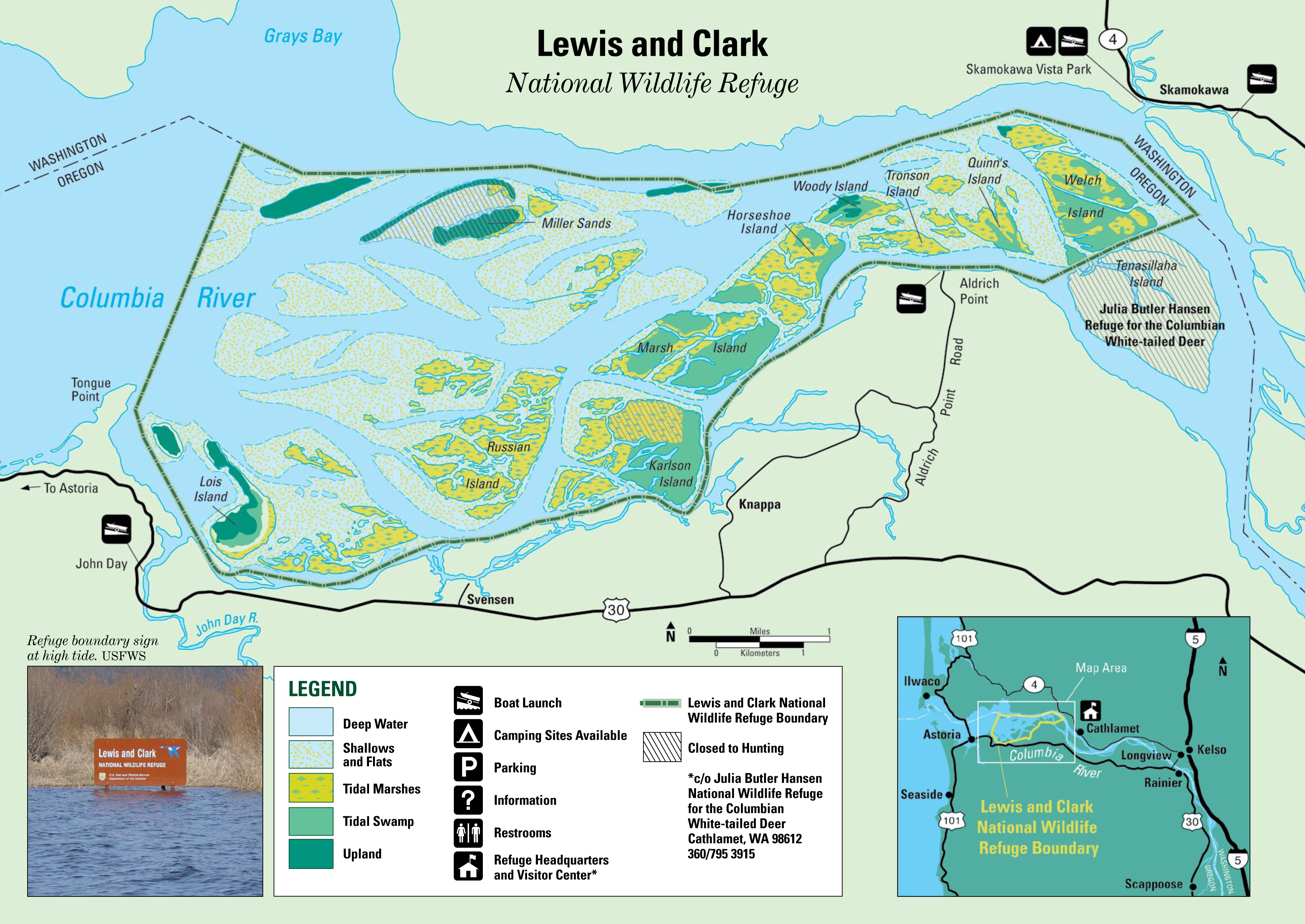
Refuge map

Lewis and Clark National Wildlife Refuge, near the mouth of the Columbia River, provides wintering and resting areas for an estimated 1,000 tundra swans, 5,000 geese, and 30,000 ducks. Other species include shorebirds and bald eagles.

Estuary waters provide vital food resources for juvenile salmon as they pause to become acclimated to salt water before entering the Pacific Ocean. Bald eagles are present year-round; there are 30 to 35 active nest sites.

Other fish species using the estuary include American shad, smelt, perch, starry flounder, bass, catfish, and Pacific lamprey. Harbor seals use sandbars and mud flats as resting sites at low tides, while seals and California sea lions feed on fish in the estuary. Beaver, raccoon, weasel, mink, muskrat, river otter, Columbian white-tailed deer and invasive nutria also live on the islands.

== Gallery ==
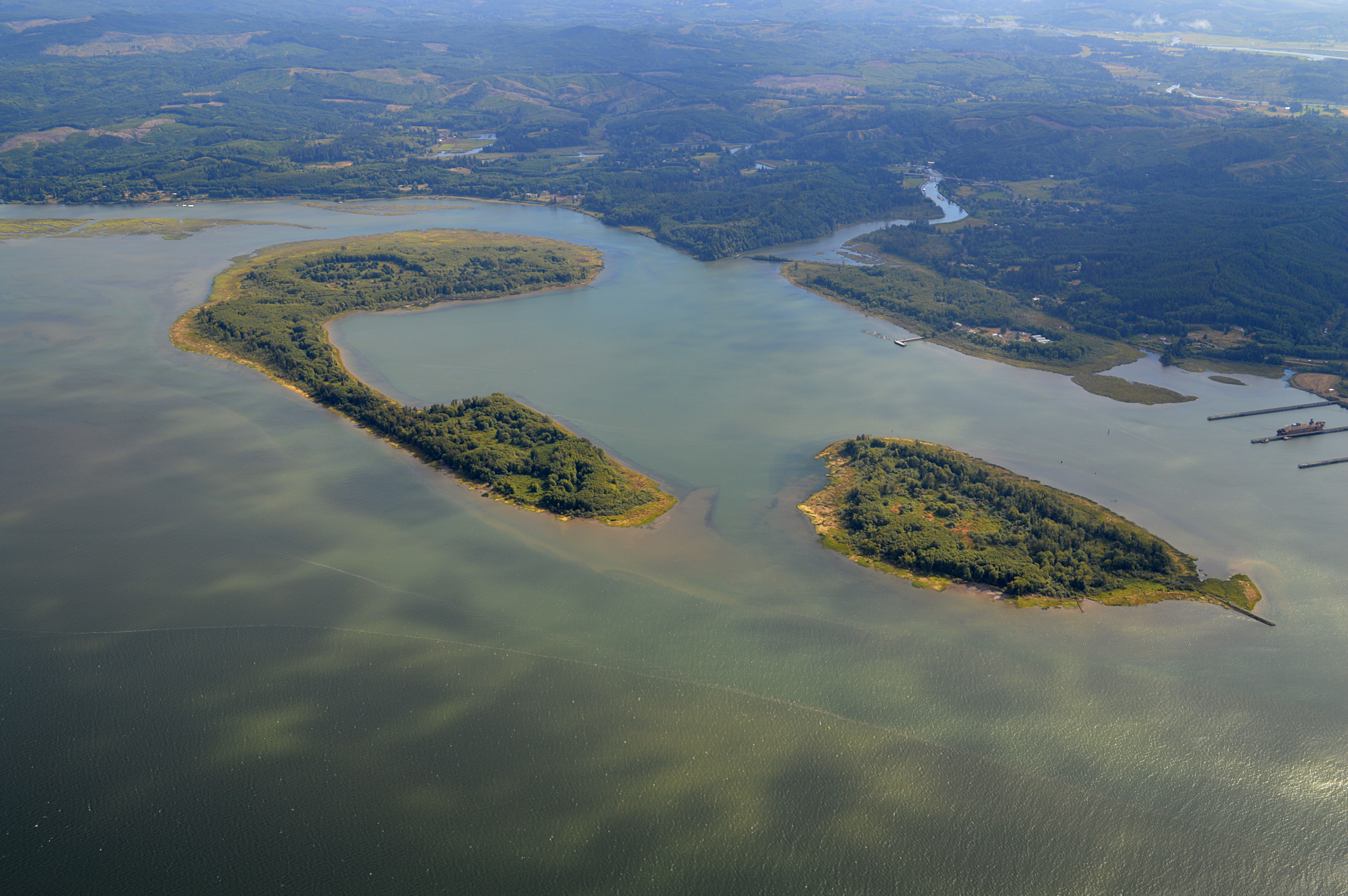
Aerial view of Lois Island

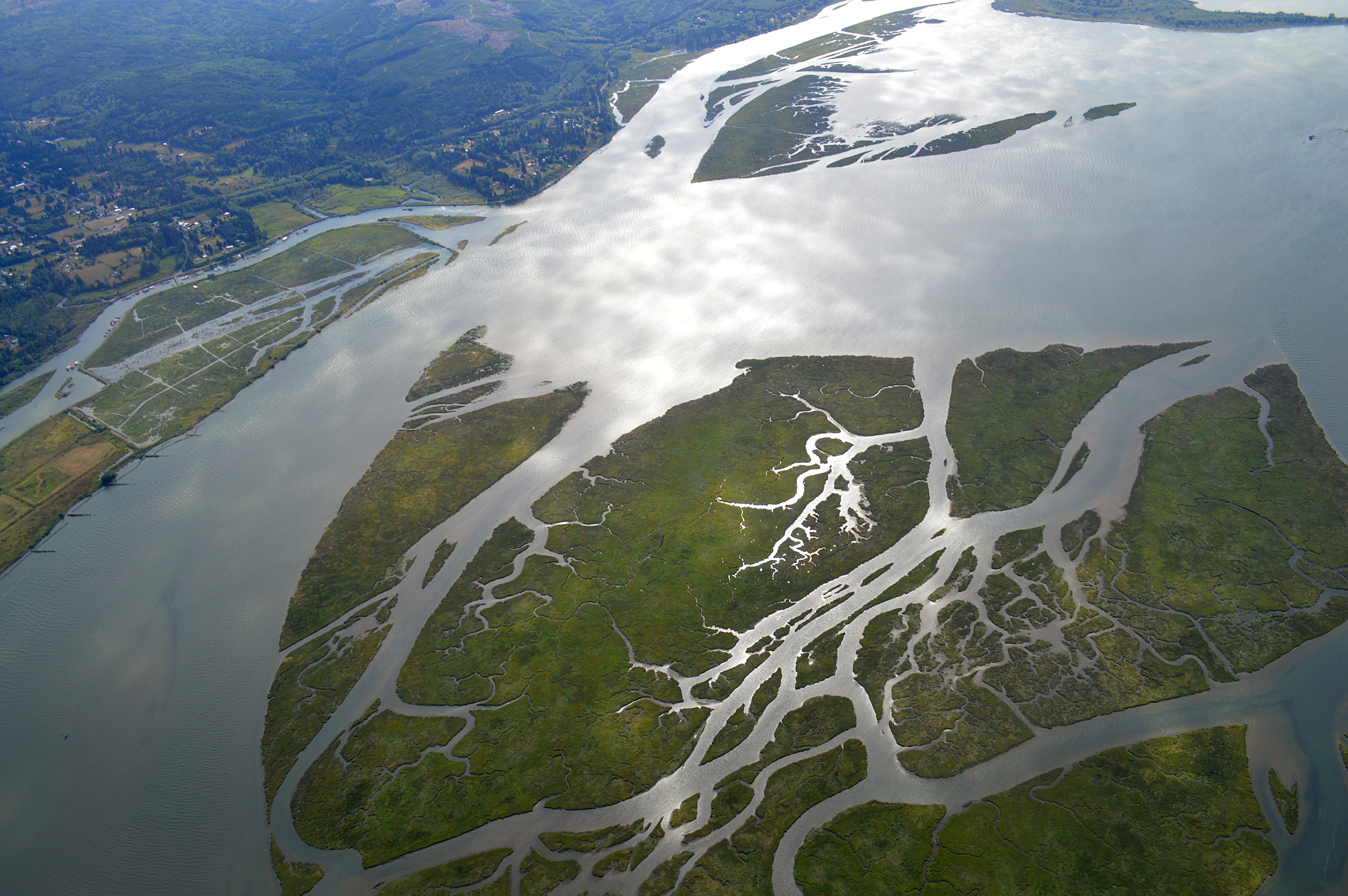
Aerial view of Russian Island

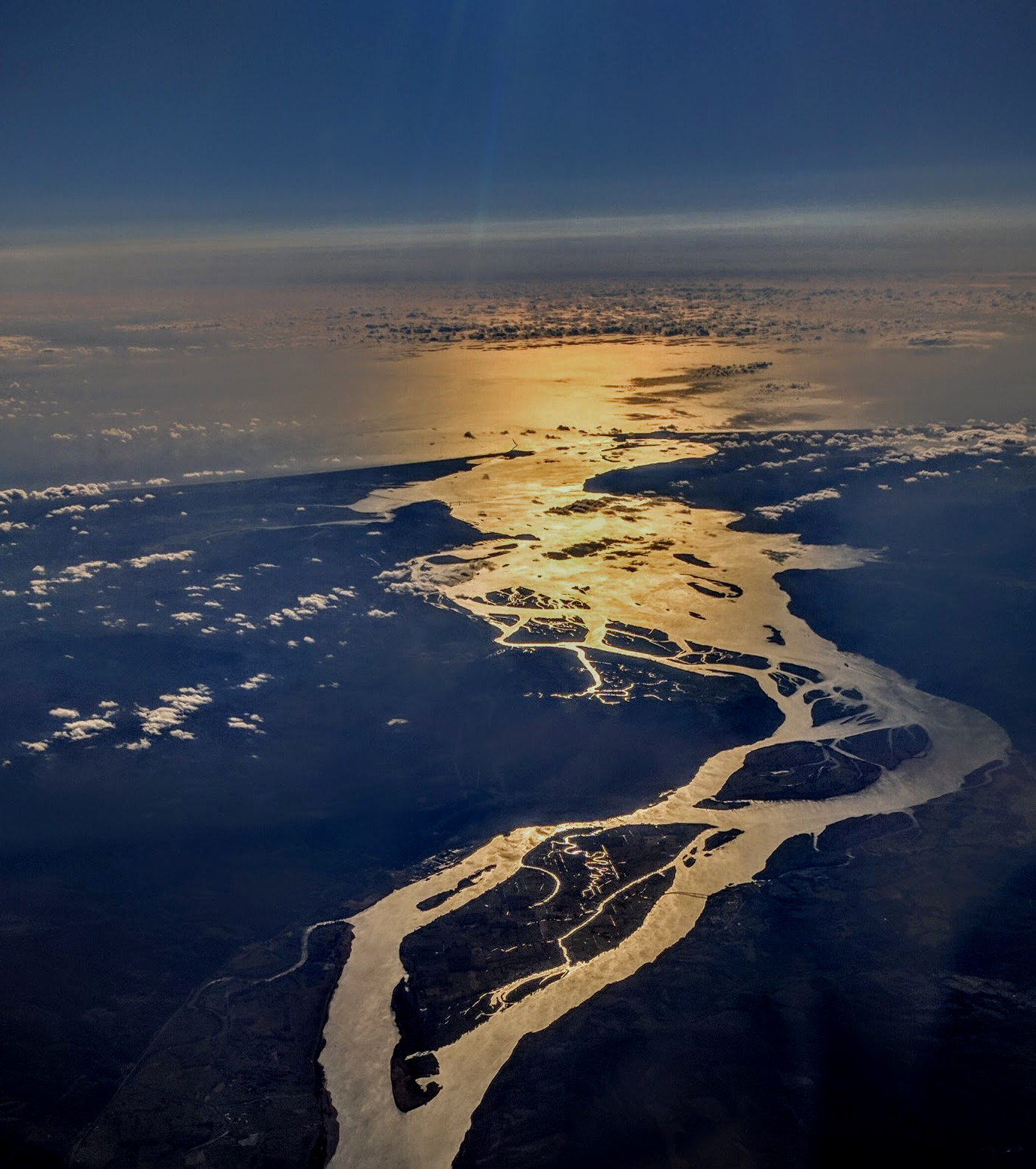
Aerial view of the Columbia River estuary including the refuge
