= Gearhart, Oregon =

- City
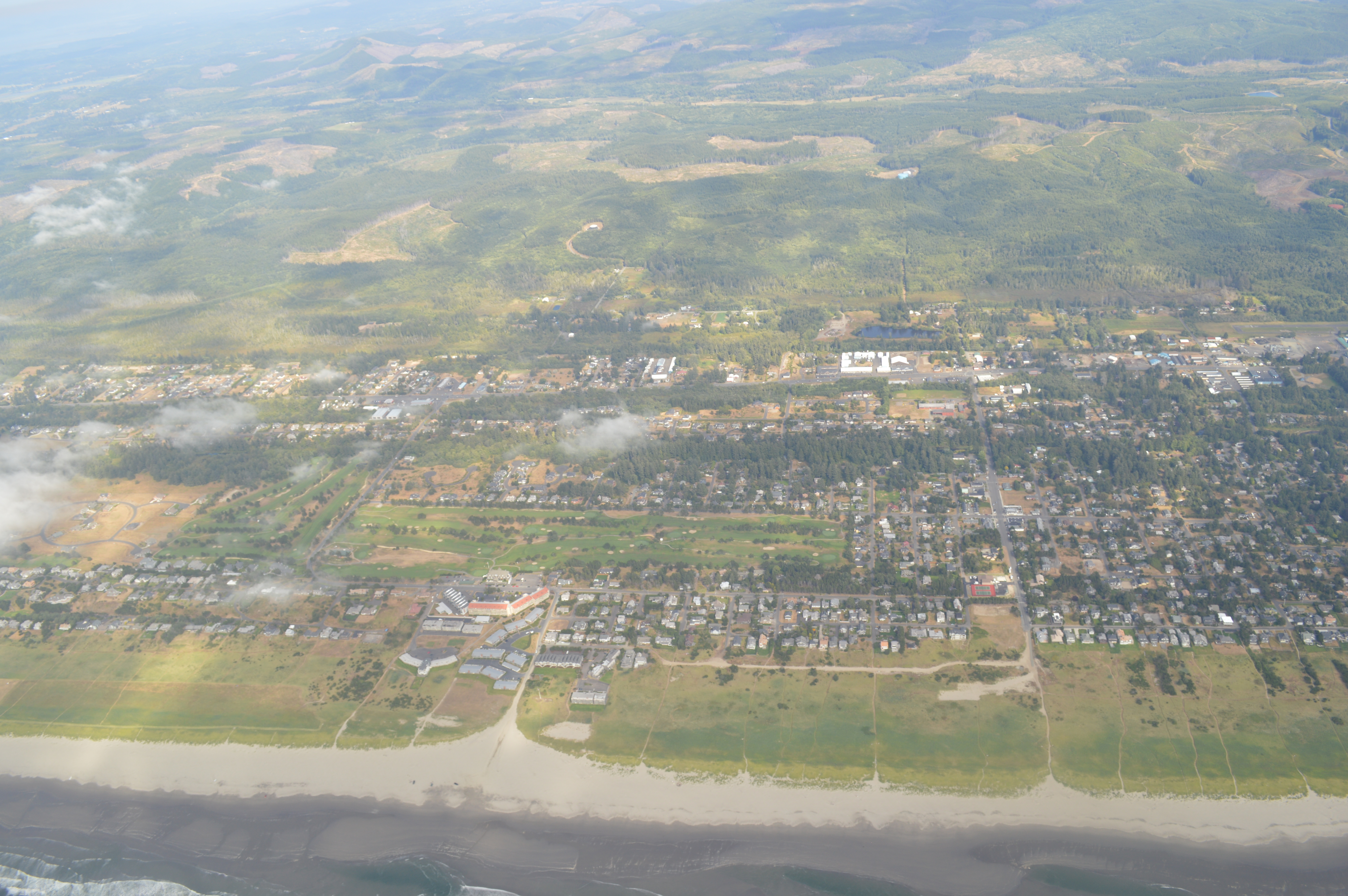
- Aerial view of Gearhart

- Location in Oregon
- Coordinates: 46°01′44″N 123°55′02″W
- Country: United States
- State: Oregon
- County: Clatsop
- Incorporated: 1918

Government
  - Mayor: Paulina Cockrum

Area
  - Total: 1.88 sq mi (4.86 km^{2})
  - Land: 1.85 sq mi (4.79 km^{2})
  - Water: 0.023 sq mi (0.06 km^{2})
- Elevation: 10 ft (3.0 m)

Population (2020)
  - Total: 1,793
  - Density: 968.5/sq mi (373.95/km^{2})
- Time zone: UTC-8 (Pacific)
  - Summer (DST): UTC-7 (Pacific)
- ZIP code: 97138
- Area codes: 503 and 971
- FIPS code: 41-28450
- GNIS feature ID: 2410578
- Website: www.cityofgearhart.com

Gearhart is a city in Clatsop County, Oregon, United States. As of the 2020 census, Gearhart had a population of 1,793.

== Geography ==
According to the United States Census Bureau, the city has a total area of 1.91 square miles (4.95 km^{2}), of which 1.90 square miles (4.92 km^{2}) is land and 0.01 square miles (0.03 km^{2}) is water.

== History ==
The city is named for Phillip Gearhart, a settler who in 1848 set out from Independence, Missouri, with his family and arrived in Oregon City in October of that year. He rented a log cabin on Clatsop Plains. At that time, other farmers had already settled primarily on the northern Plains. The first farmer to settle there was Solomon Smith. In 1851, Gearhart bought a squatter's right in the south Plains for $1,000. He used it to create a 640-acre (2.6 km^{2}) donation land claim; the US patent was granted in 1874. Gearhart increased his holdings by 537 acres (2.17 km^{2}) in 1859 through a purchase from Obadiah C. Motley, and again in 1863 by 571 acres (2.31 km^{2}) purchased from Jefferson J. Louk. The entire parcel encompassed all of what is now called Gearhart, as well as a portion of Seaside across the Necanicum River estuary. Gearhart built a home and farm for his family near a grist mill by Mill Creek, in a sheltered area north and east of the estuary.

In 1889, a railroad was built between Astoria and Seaside. It became a means of transportation to Seaside not only for Astorians but for Portlanders disembarking from the ferry in Astoria. Gearhart began to draw attention as a pleasant landscape for wandering and picnicking. Early settlers were attracted to the Ridge Path through the dune meadows of the Phillip Gearhart land claim.

== Demographics ==
Historical population
Census	Pop.	Note	%±
1910	75		—
1920	127		69.3%
1930	125		−1.6%
1940	319		155.2%
1950	568		78.1%
1960	725		27.6%
1970	829		14.3%
1980	967		16.6%
1990	1,027		6.2%
2000	995		−3.1%
2010	1,462		46.9%
2020	1,793		22.6%

=== 2020 census ===
As of the 2020 census, Gearhart had a population of 1,793. The median age was 53.4 years. 17.2% of residents were under the age of 18 and 31.1% of residents were 65 years of age or older. For every 100 females there were 93.2 males, and for every 100 females age 18 and over there were 89.9 males age 18 and over.

99.6% of residents lived in urban areas, while 0.4% lived in rural areas.

There were 767 households in Gearhart, of which 21.8% had children under the age of 18 living in them. Of all households, 57.2% were married-couple households, 12.0% were households with a male householder and no spouse or partner present, and 22.8% were households with a female householder and no spouse or partner present. About 23.5% of all households were made up of individuals and 14.0% had someone living alone who was 65 years of age or older.

There were 1,513 housing units, of which 49.3% were vacant. Among occupied housing units, 80.6% were owner-occupied and 19.4% were renter-occupied. The homeowner vacancy rate was 4.1% and the rental vacancy rate was 16.9%.

Racial composition as of the 2020 census
Race	Number	Percent
White	1,578	88.0%
Black or African American	5	0.3%
American Indian and Alaska Native	22	1.2%
Asian	21	1.2%
Native Hawaiian and Other Pacific Islander	3	0.2%
Some other race	26	1.5%
Two or more races	138	7.7%
Hispanic or Latino (of any race)	111	6.2%

=== 2010 census ===
As of the census of 2010, there were 1,462 people, 649 households, and 429 families residing in the city. The population density was 769.5 inhabitants per square mile (297.1/km^{2}). There were 1,450 housing units at an average density of 763.2 per square mile (294.7/km^{2}). The racial makeup of the city was 94.6% White, 0.3% African American, 0.4% Native American, 0.8% Asian, 0.2% Pacific Islander, 1.7% from other races, and 2.0% from two or more races. Hispanic or Latino of any race were 4.0% of the population.

There were 649 households, of which 22.3% had children under the age of 18 living with them, 54.2% were married couples living together, 8.3% had a female householder with no husband present, 3.5% had a male householder with no wife present, and 33.9% were non-families. 26.2% of all households were made up of individuals, and 10.7% had someone living alone who was 65 years of age or older. The average household size was 2.25 and the average family size was 2.69.

The median age in the city was 49 years. 17.4% of residents were under the age of 18; 6.2% were between the ages of 18 and 24; 20.3% were from 25 to 44; 37.8% were from 45 to 64; and 18.4% were 65 years of age or older. The gender makeup of the city was 48.9% male and 51.1% female.

=== 2000 census ===
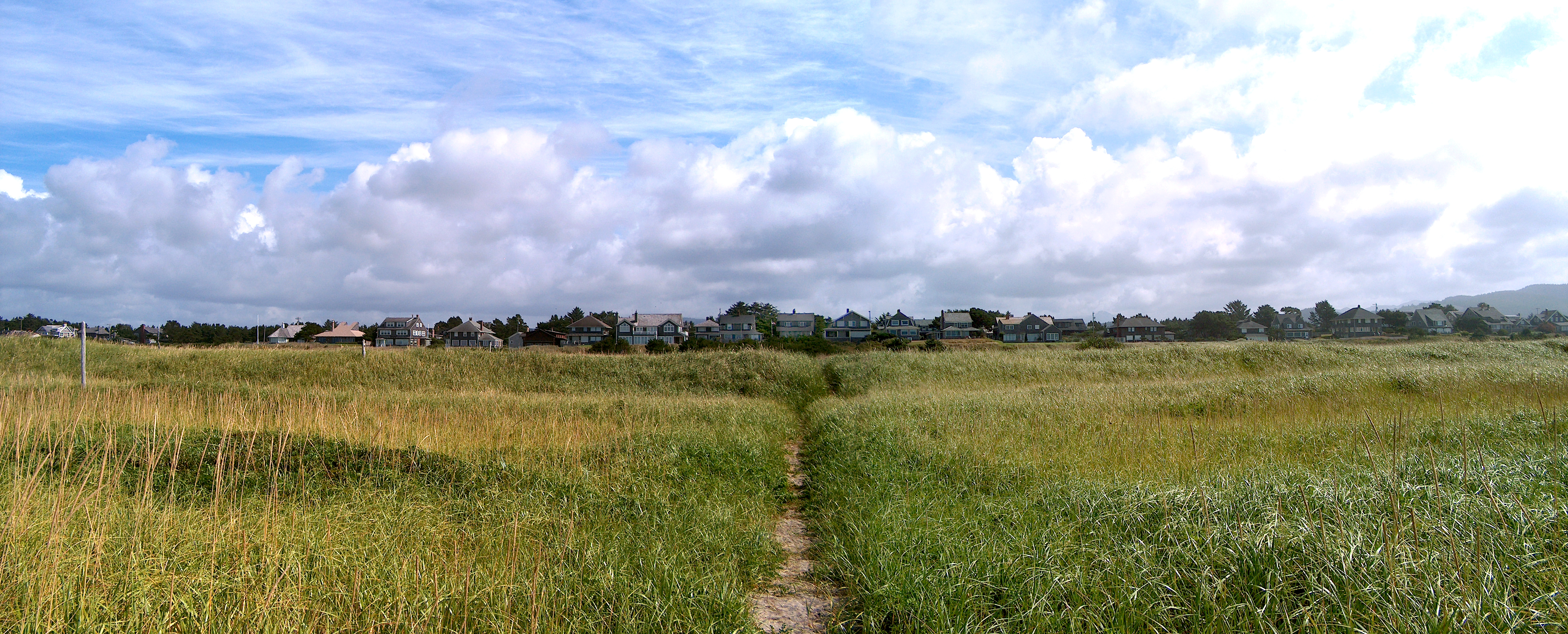
Homes on Gin Ridge

As of the census of 2000, there were 995 people, 450 households, and 282 families residing in the city. The population density was 804.2 inhabitants per square mile (310.5/km^{2}). There were 1,055 housing units at an average density of 852.7 per square mile (329.2/km^{2}). The racial makeup of the city was 98.39% White, 0.30% Native American, 0.30% Asian, and 1.01% from two or more races. Hispanic or Latino of any race were 0.50% of the population. 16.0% were German, 15.7% English, 10.2% Irish, 7.4% American, 5.7% Norwegian and 5.2% Swedish ancestry according to Census 2000.

There were 450 households, out of which 22.7% had children under the age of 18 living with them, 52.9% were married couples living together, 6.4% had a female householder with no husband present, and 37.3% were non-families. 32.4% of all households were made up of individuals, and 12.2% had someone living alone who was 65 years of age or older. The average household size was 2.21 and the average family size was 2.76.

In the city, the population was spread out, with 19.9% under the age of 18, 4.5% from 18 to 24, 21.3% from 25 to 44, 35.6% from 45 to 64, and 18.7% who were 65 years of age or older. The median age was 47 years. For every 100 females, there were 95.9 males. For every 100 females aged 18 and over, there were 93.4 males.

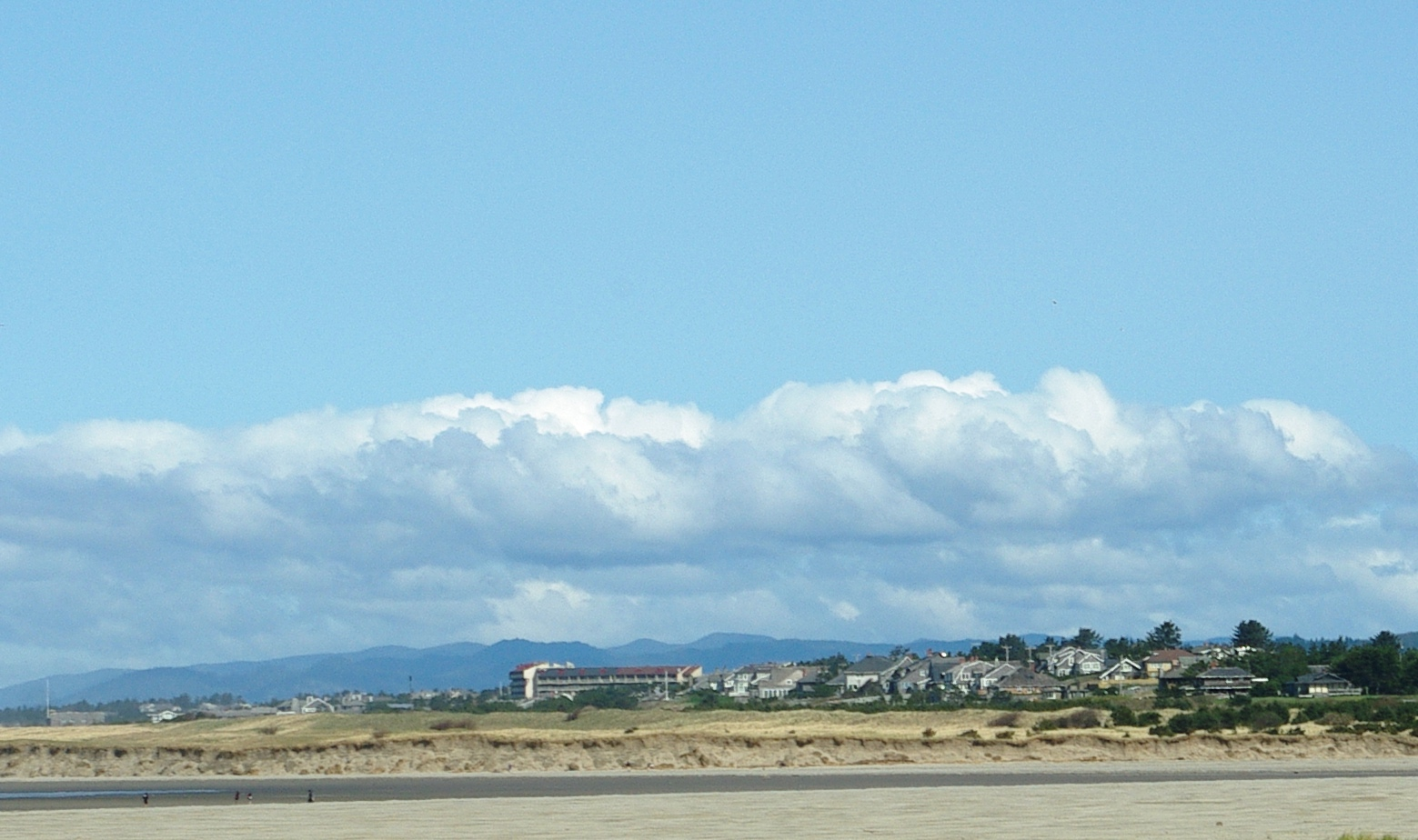
Gearhart, looking north from Seaside with Necanicum River outlet in foreground

The median income for a household in the city was $43,047, and the median income for a family was $49,583. Males had a median income of $32,500 versus $23,636 for females. The per capita income for the city was $25,224. About 4.7% of families and 6.4% of the population were below the poverty line, including 4.8% of those under age 18 and 6.8% of those aged 65 or over.

== Topography ==
The city lies on flat land along the coast. The Oregon geology department determined the city lacks viable options for high ground, leaving it vulnerable to tsunamis.

== Education ==
It is in the Seaside School District 10. The comprehensive high school of that district is Seaside High School.

Clatsop County is in the boundary of Clatsop Community College.

== Notable people ==
- Charles Royer, journalist and former Mayor of Seattle
