= Hamlet, Oregon =

Unincorporated community in Oregon, US

Coordinates: 45°50′46″N 123°42′02″W

Hamlet is an unincorporated community in Clatsop County, Oregon, United States. It is located approximately six miles southeast of Necanicum, in the Northern Oregon Coast Range near the confluence of the North Fork Nehalem River and the Little North Fork Nehalem River. It is surrounded by units of the Clatsop State Forest.

The town was founded by Finns and according to author Ralph Friedman, the place never had a store, church, post office, or village center. Oregon Geographic Names however, says that Hamlet post office was established circa 1905, and was named because it was a small community, or hamlet. The Hamlet post office was located at 5 or more locations over the years, as each new postmaster would build a new shed to serve as one on their homestead. The post office closed in 1953, with mail going to Seaside. Hamlet did have a school, which currently serves as a community center. The original schoolhouse burned down in 1910, and a new one was constructed about 1/2 mile away in 1911 There is also a cemetery. A later Friedman book gives the history of the post office and the Finnish founders of the town.
