= Melville, Oregon =

Unincorporated community in the state of Oregon, United States

- Unincorporated community
- Location within Oregon Location within the United States
- Coordinates: 46°03′36″N 123°50′37″W
- Country: United States
- State: Oregon
- County: Clatsop
- Elevation: 26 ft (7.9 m)
- Time zone: UTC-8 (Pacific (PST))
  - Summer (DST): UTC-7 (PDT)
- ZIP code: 97103
- Area codes: 503 and 971
- GNIS feature ID: 1136532

Melville is an unincorporated community in Clatsop County, Oregon, United States, on the Lewis and Clark River. Its post office was established in February 1891, with Wilthea S. Ingalls postmaster. The post office closed in November 1922.
