= Lukarilla, Oregon =

Unincorporated community in the state of Oregon, United States

- Unincorporated community
- Location within Oregon Location within the United States
- Coordinates: 45°49′38″N 123°36′06″W
- Country: United States
- State: Oregon
- County: Clatsop
- Elevation: 387 ft (118 m)
- Time zone: UTC−08:00 (Pacific (PST))
  - Summer (DST): UTC−07:00 (PDT)
- ZIP code: 97138
- Area codes: 503 and 971
- GNIS feature ID: 1136504

Lukarilla is an unincorporated community on the Nehalem River in Clatsop County, Oregon, United States
