= Miles Crossing, Oregon =

Unincorporated community in the state of Oregon, United States

- Unincorporated community
- Location within Oregon Location within the United States
- Coordinates: 46°09′08″N 123°50′23″W
- Country: United States
- State: Oregon
- County: Clatsop
- Elevation: 10 ft (3.0 m)
- Time zone: UTC-8 (Pacific (PST))
  - Summer (DST): UTC-7 (PDT)
- ZIP code: 97103
- Area codes: 503 and 971
- GNIS feature ID: 1124138

Miles Crossing is an unincorporated community in Clatsop County, Oregon, United States.
