= Wauna, Oregon =

Unincorporated community in the state of Oregon, United States

- Unincorporated community
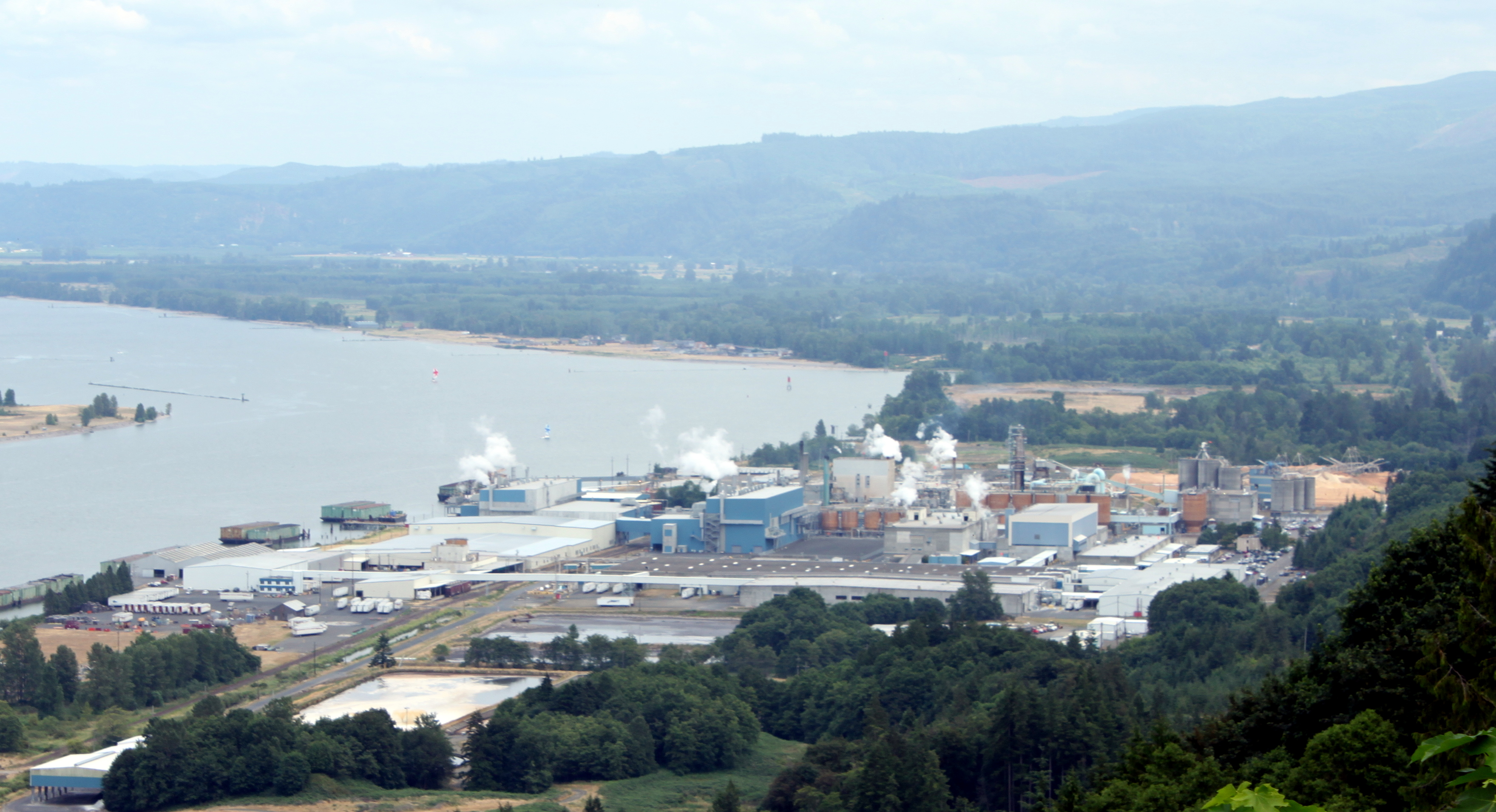
- Paper mill from Bradley State Scenic Viewpoint

- Location within the state of Oregon Wauna (the United States)
- Coordinates: 46°09′25″N 123°24′22″W
- Country: United States
- State: Oregon
- County: Clatsop
- Elevation: 20 ft (6.1 m)
- Time zone: UTC-8 (Pacific (PST))
  - Summer (DST): UTC-7 (PDT)
- ZIP code: 97016
- Area codes: 503 and 971
- GNIS feature ID: 1128740

Wauna is an unincorporated community on the Columbia River in Clatsop County, Oregon, United States. According to Oregon Geographic Names, it names a Native American mythological being associated with the Columbia River. There was a post office in Wauna from January 21, 1911, to circa 1980. Wauna is best known as the home of a Georgia-Pacific paper mill.
