= Jordan Poyer =

American football player (born 1991)

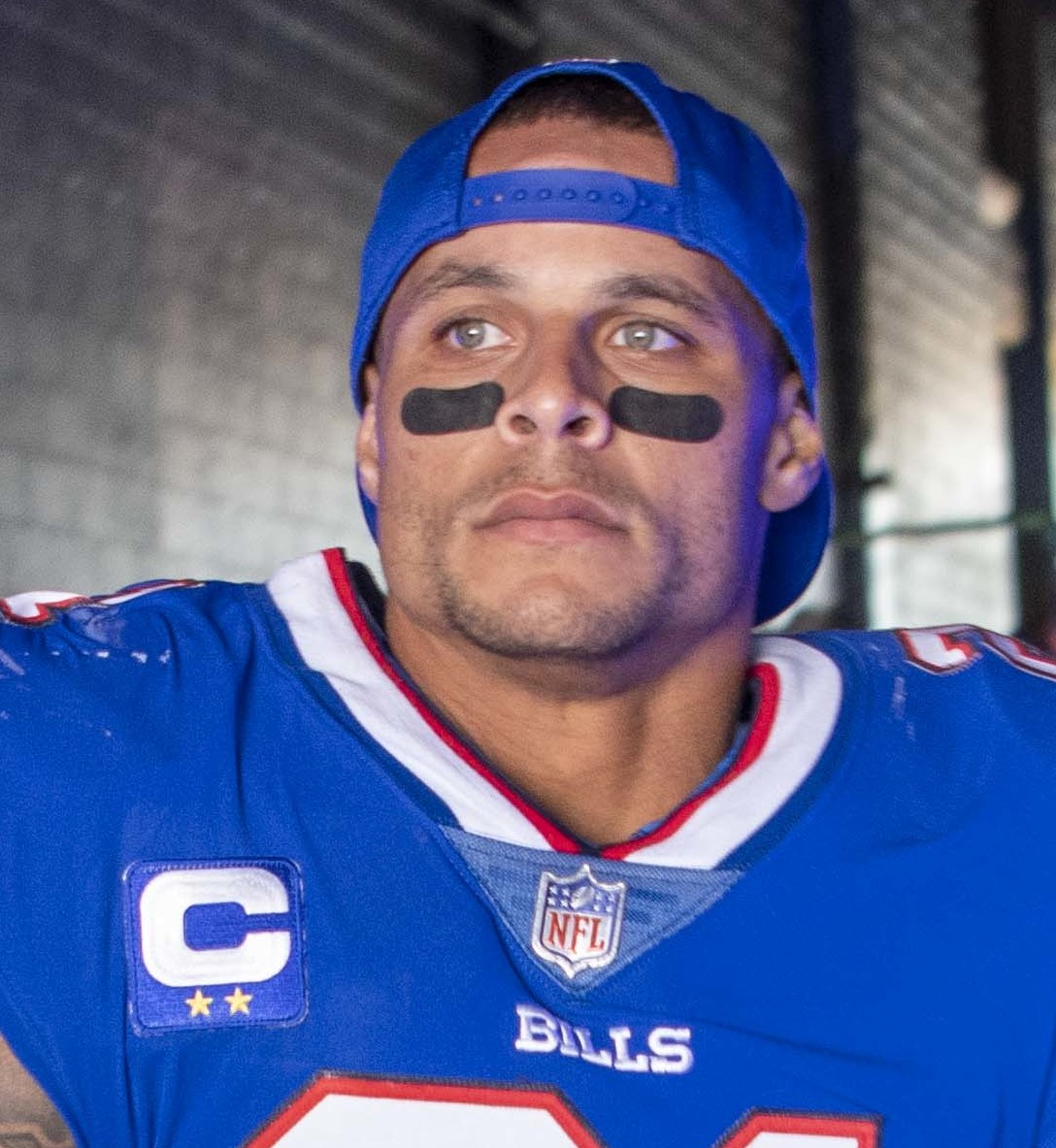
- Poyer with the Buffalo Bills in 2021

Profile
- Position: Safety

Personal information
- Born: April 25, 1991 (age 35); Dallas, Oregon, U.S.
- Listed height: 6 ft 0 in (1.83 m)
- Listed weight: 191 lb (87 kg)

Career information
- High school: Astoria (Astoria, Oregon)
- College: Oregon State (2009–2012)
- NFL draft: 2013: 7th round, 218th overall pick

Career history
- Philadelphia Eagles (2013); Cleveland Browns (2013–2016); Buffalo Bills (2017–2023); Miami Dolphins (2024); Buffalo Bills (2025)

Awards and highlights
- First-team All-Pro (2021); Pro Bowl (2022); Consensus All-American (2012); First-team All-Pac-12 (2012); Second-team All-Pac-12 (2011)

Career NFL statistics as of 2025
- Total tackles: 974
- Sacks: 12.5
- Forced fumbles: 9
- Fumble recoveries: 7
- Pass deflections: 60
- Interceptions: 25
- Defensive touchdowns: 1
- Stats at Pro Football Reference

Jordan Lynn-Baxter Poyer (born April 25, 1991) is an American professional football safety. He played college football for the Oregon State Beavers, where he was a consensus All-American. Poyer was selected by the Philadelphia Eagles in the 2013 NFL draft, but was waived only a few months into his rookie season. After becoming a backup safety for the Cleveland Browns, Poyer later became a starter for the Buffalo Bills, where he formed one of the league's top safety tandems alongside Micah Hyde. Poyer earned All-Pro and Pro Bowl accolades while on the Bills. He has also played for the Miami Dolphins.

== Early life ==
Poyer played baseball, basketball, and football at Astoria High School. As a freshman, he helped the baseball team win the state championship and as a senior he helped the football team win the state championship. As a senior, he was named Oregon's player of the year and was drafted by the Florida Marlins in the 42nd round of the 2009 Major League Baseball Draft. In 2009, Poyer was named the baseball Cowapa League Player of the Year. He was a quarterback and safety on the football team and had 123 touchdowns in three years. In his senior season, he was the state's player of the year on offense and defense.

== College career ==
=== Football ===
Poyer attended Oregon State University and played for the Oregon State Beavers football team from 2009 to 2012. As a true freshman in 2009, he played in 13 games and had 11 tackles. The following season, he had 1,109 all-purpose yards and 34 tackles at the cornerback position.

Poyer started 12 games in 2011. He was the team's primary punt returner and averaged 14.1 yards per return. His four interceptions ranked first in the Pac-12, and he also had 57 tackles. In 2012, Poyer had 51 tackles. He again led the Pac-12 in interceptions, with seven. That season, he was named to the All-Pac-12 first-team and was also a consensus All-American.

=== Baseball ===
Poyer did not play college baseball in his first two years at Oregon State. In 2010, he played collegiate summer baseball for the Corvallis Knights and decided to join the 2011 Oregon State Beavers baseball team in the spring. However, by April, he found the workload to be too much and decided to quit the team. He described it as "definitely one of the hardest decisions [he had] ever had to make." All told, he appeared in seven games for the Beavers and had three hits and two walks in fourteen plate appearances.

== Professional career ==
External videos
- Jordan Poyer's NFL Combine Workout
- Jordan Poyer's 40-yard dash

Pre-draft measurables
Height	Weight	Arm length	Hand span	40-yard dash	10-yard split	20-yard split	20-yard shuttle	Three-cone drill	Vertical jump	Broad jump	Bench press
5 ft 11 7/8 in (1.83 m)	191 lb (87 kg)	31 3/4 in (0.81 m)	9 3/4 in (0.25 m)	4.54 s	1.51 s	2.59 s	4.18 s	6.87 s	30.5 in (0.77 m)	9 ft 10 in (3.00 m)	20 reps
All values from NFL Combine/Pro Day

=== Philadelphia Eagles ===
External videos
- Titans draft Jordan Poyer 218th overall

The Philadelphia Eagles selected Poyer in the seventh round (218th overall) of the 2013 NFL draft. On May 9, 2013, the Eagles signed Poyer to a four-year, $2.22 million contract that includes a signing bonus of $60,256.

Throughout training camp, he competed for a roster spot as a backup cornerback against Brandon Boykin, Curtis Marsh Jr., Trevard Lindley, and Brandon Hughes. Head coach Chip Kelly named Poyer the fourth cornerback on the depth chart, behind Cary Williams, Bradley Fletcher, and Brandon Boykin.

He made his professional regular season debut in the Philadelphia Eagles' season-opener at the Washington Redskins and recorded three combined tackles in their 33–27 victory. He made his first career tackle with teammate Nate Allen on tight end Fred Davis after Davis caught a ten-yard pass in the third quarter. Poyer was relegated to special teams after he was surpassed on the depth chart by Shaun Prater and Roc Carmichael. On October 19, 2013, the Philadelphia Eagles released Poyer after he was a healthy scratch in their last two games (Weeks 5–6).

=== Cleveland Browns ===
==== 2013 ====
On October 21, 2013, the Cleveland Browns claimed Poyer off of waivers. Upon arrival, head coach Rob Chudzinski named Poyer the backup strong safety behind T. J. Ward after Josh Aubrey was placed on injured reserve due to injuries to his ankle and knee.

On December 8, 2013, Poyer recorded a season-high six solo tackles during a 27–26 loss at the New England Patriots in Week 14. On December 30, 2013, the Cleveland Browns fired head coach Rob Chudzinski after they finished with a 4–12 record. He finished his rookie season with 21 combined tackles (20 solo) in 12 games and zero starts. He also served as a backup punt returner, returning eight punts for 114 yards.

==== 2014 ====
During training camp, he competed for a roster spot as a backup safety against Jim Leonhard, Johnson Bademosi, Josh Aubrey, Robert Nelson, and Darwin Cook. Head coach Mike Pettine named Poyer the backup free safety, behind Tashaun Gipson, to start the regular season.

On September 14, 2014, Poyer forced a fumble by running back Khiry Robinson during a 30-yard kickoff return by Robinson as time expired during a 26–24 victory against the New Orleans Saints in Week 2. It marked the first forced fumble of Poyer's career. On December 14, 2014, Poyer recorded a season-high four combined tackles in the Browns' 30–0 loss to the Cincinnati Bengals in Week 15. In Week 17, he made a season-high three solo tackles and assisted on a tackle during a 20–10 loss to the Baltimore Ravens. He finished the season with 21 combined tackles (15 solo) in 16 games and zero starts.

==== 2015 ====
Poyer returned as the backup free safety behind Tashaun Gipson to begin the regular season in 2015. On October 18, 2015, Poyer earned his first career start in place of Gipson, who suffered an ankle injury the previous week. He recorded three solo tackles, as the Browns lost 26–23 to the Denver Broncos. The following week, he made his second consecutive start and collected a season-high 11 combined tackles (five solo) during a 24–6 loss at the St. Louis Rams in Week 7. He was inactive for two games (Weeks 8–9) after sustaining a shoulder injury. On November 15, 2015, Poyer recorded four combined tackles, broke up a pass, and made his first career interception by Ben Roethlisberger during a 30–9 loss at the Pittsburgh Steelers in Week 10. In Week 14, he recorded two solo tackles and made his first career sack on quarterback Blaine Gabbert during a 24–10 victory against the San Francisco 49ers. On January 3, 2016, Poyer made his fourth career start and made four combined tackles, a season-high two pass deflections, and intercepted Ben Roethlisberger during a 28–12 loss to the Steelers. Following the game, head coach Mike Pettine was officially relieved of his duties by general manager Ray Farmer after the Cleveland Browns finished the season with a 3–13 record. He finished the 2015 season with 43 combined tackles (28 solo), four pass deflections, two interceptions, and a sack in 14 games and four starts.

==== 2016 ====
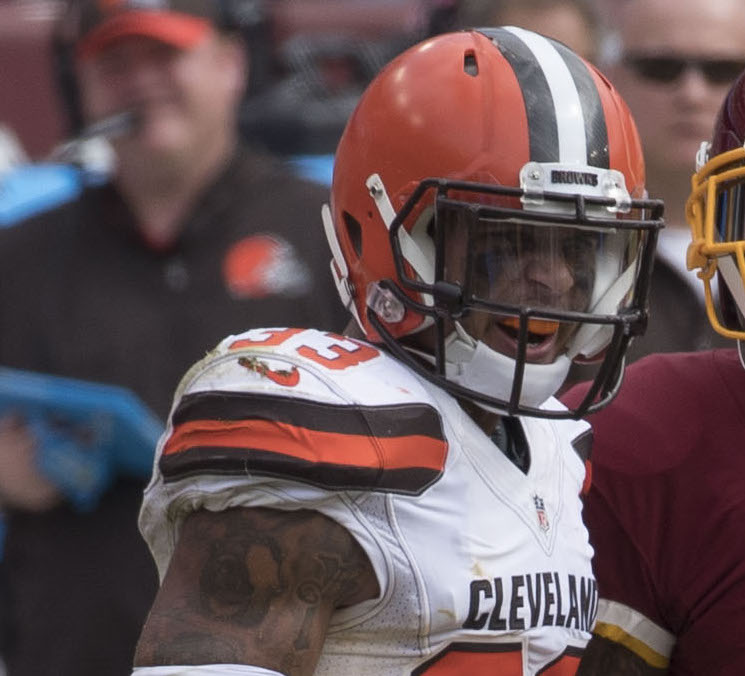
Poyer in a game against the Washington Redskins

Throughout training camp, Poyer competed against Rahim Moore for the job as the starting free safety after Tashaun Gipson departed in free agency. Head coach Hue Jackson named Poyer the starting free safety to start the regular season, alongside Ibraheim Campbell.

He started the Browns' season-opener at the Eagles and made six solo tackles in their 29–10 loss. On September 25, 2016, Poyer collected a career-high 13 combined tackles (ten solo) and deflected a pass during a 30–24 loss at the Miami Dolphins in Week 3. On October 16, 2016, Poyer collected three solo tackles before exiting the Browns' 28–26 loss at the Tennessee Titans due to an injury. During the second quarter, Poyer was in the midst of covering a punt when he was hit by an illegal blindside block by running back Antonio Andrews. The Titans were penalized 15 yards for unnecessary roughness, and Poyer was immediately rushed to the hospital, where he was diagnosed with a lacerated kidney and a possible concussion. Andrews received criticism among players and the media due to his decision to glorify the hit by posting the video of it to his social media account. On October 18, 2016, the Cleveland Browns placed Poyer on injured reserve, and he was expected to take up to four months to recover. He finished the 2016 season with 39 combined tackles (29 solo) and two pass deflections in six games and six starts.

=== Buffalo Bills (first stint) ===
==== 2017 ====
On March 9, 2017, the Buffalo Bills signed Poyer to a four-year, $13 million contract that includes $7.40 million guaranteed and a signing bonus of $3.50 million. He immediately signed with the Bills on the first day of free agency and was reunited with the Cleveland Browns' former assistant defensive backs coach, Bobby Babich. Babich originally met Poyer while running defensive back field drills at the 2013 NFL Scouting Combine.

Head coach Sean McDermott named Poyer the starting strong safety to start the regular season, along with free safety Micah Hyde. He started in the Bills' season-opener against the New York Jets and recorded three combined tackles, two pass deflections, a sack, and intercepted a pass by Josh McCown in their 21–12 victory. The following week, he collected a season-high 11 combined tackles (seven solo) and three pass deflections during a 9–3 loss at the Carolina Panthers in Week 2. He was inactive for the Bills' Week 8 victory against the Oakland Raiders due to a knee injury. In Week 11, Poyer recorded a season-high eight solo tackles, three assisted tackles, and deflected a pass in the Bills' 54–24 loss at the Los Angeles Chargers. On December 24, 2017, Poyer recorded six combined tackles, broke up a pass, an interception, and a touchdown during a 37–16 loss at the Patriots in Week 16. He intercepted a pass by Tom Brady that was intended for Kenny Britt and returned it for a 19-yard touchdown in the second quarter to mark the first score of his career. He finished his first season with the Buffalo Bills with a 94 combined tackles (63 solo), 13 pass deflections, five interceptions, two sacks, and a touchdown in 15 games and 15 starts. He had a career-high in all five stat categories.

The Buffalo Bills finished second in the AFC East with a 9–7 record. On January 7, 2018, Poyer started in his first career playoff game and recorded five combined tackles during a 10–3 loss at the Jacksonville Jaguars in the Wild Card Round.

==== 2018 ====
Poyer finished the 2018 season with 100 combined tackles, 4 interceptions, 2 sacks, and 1 forced fumble. Though the Bills missed the playoffs in 2018, their defense, including Poyer and Hyde, remained stout, quietly finishing with the second-fewest passing yards allowed in the league. Notably, Poyer's interception of Aaron Rodgers in a week 4 loss to the Green Bay Packers ended Rodgers' streak of 150 passes without an interception.

==== 2019 ====
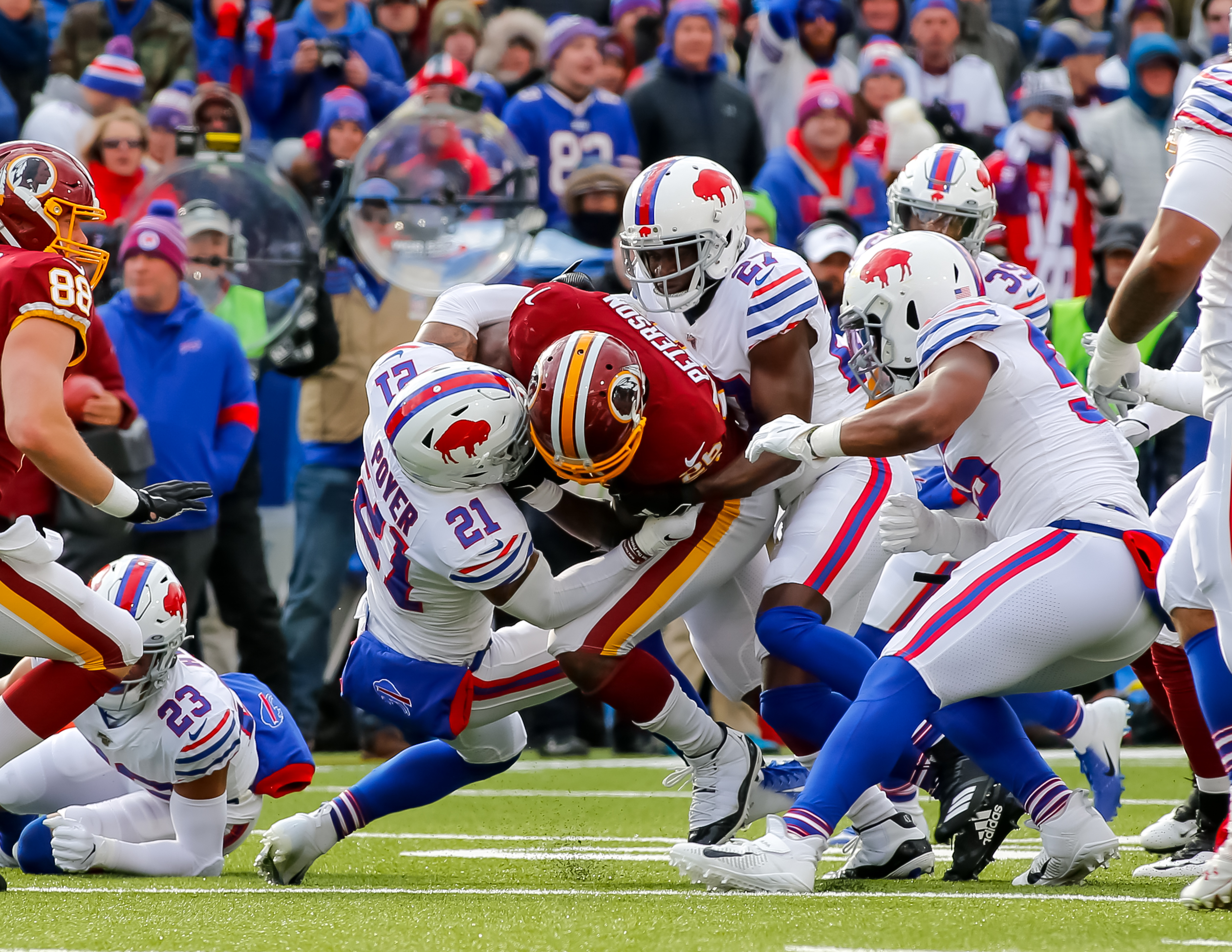
Poyer in a game against the Washington Redskins in 2019

In week 2 against the New York Giants, Poyer recorded his first interception of the season off Eli Manning in the 28–14 win. In week 11 against the Dolphins, Poyer forced a fumble on wide receiver Allen Hurns and recovered the football in the 37–20 win. In week 15 against the Steelers on Sunday Night Football, Poyer intercepted a pass thrown by rookie quarterback Devlin Hodges in the endzone and recovered a fumble forced by teammate Trent Murphy on Diontae Johnson during the 17–10 win. In week 16 against the Patriots, Poyer recorded 11 total tackles and forced fumble on running back Rex Burkhead which was recovered by teammate Micah Hyde in the 24–17 loss.

==== 2020 ====
On March 19, 2020, Poyer signed a two-year contract extension with the Bills.

In Week 2 against the Dolphins, Poyer recorded his first sack of the season on Ryan Fitzpatrick during the 31–28 win. In Week 9 against the Seattle Seahawks, Poyer recorded his first interception of the season off a pass thrown by Russell Wilson during the 44–34 win. He finished the 2020 season with two sacks, 124 total tackles (91 solo), two interceptions, five passes defended, and two forced fumbles in 16 games and starts.

==== 2021 ====
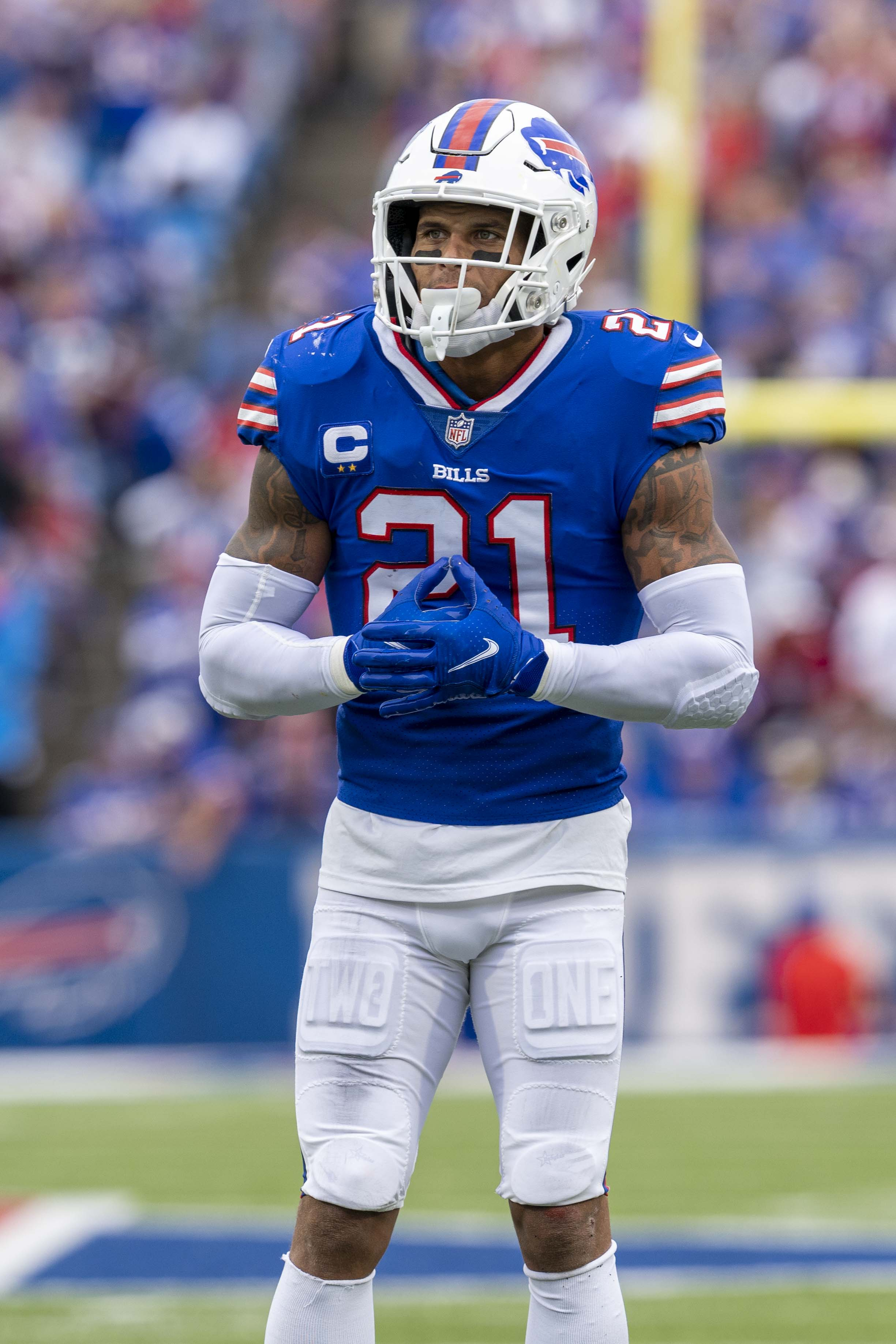
Poyer playing for the Bills in 2021

On January 14, 2022, Poyer was named to the 2021 All-Pro Team, the first of his career. He finished the 2021 season with a career-high three sacks and tied a previous high of five interceptions, becoming the only NFL player to attain at least five interceptions and three sacks that season, as the Bills finished with the league's top defense. He was ranked 45th by his fellow players on the NFL Top 100 Players of 2022.

==== 2022 ====
In Week 4, Poyer had two interceptions, six tackles, and six passes defensed in a 23–20 win over the Ravens, earning AFC Defensive Player of the Week. Throughout the 2022 season, Poyer battled multiple injuries and missed several games but remained a key part of Buffalo's defense. Notably, he rode in a van to the Bills' game against the Kansas City Chiefs as he was unable to fly due to a collapsed lung. He was voted to his first Pro Bowl appearance at the end of the season. He was ranked 57th by his fellow players on the NFL Top 100 Players of 2023.

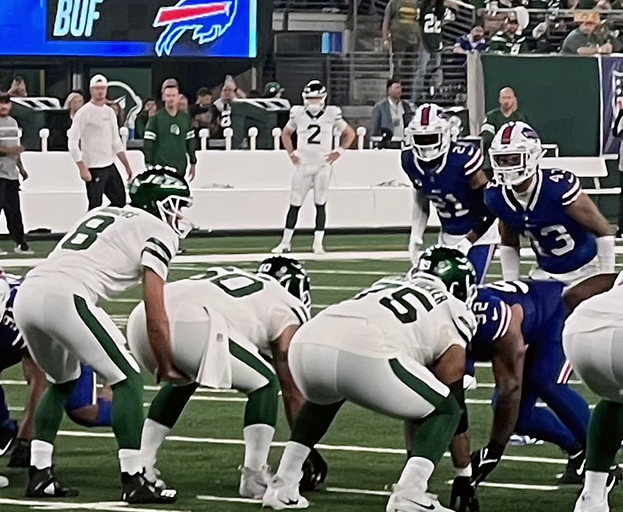
Poyer (#21) and teammate Terrel Bernard (#43) against the Aaron Rodgers-led New York Jets in 2023

==== 2023 ====
On March 15, 2023, Poyer signed a two-year contract extension with the Bills.

He finished the 2023 season with 101 total tackles (67 solo tackles), 4 passes defensed, and 1 sack.

On March 6, 2024, Poyer was released by the Bills after seven seasons.

=== Miami Dolphins ===
On March 18, 2024, Poyer signed with the Miami Dolphins. During Miami's week 9 game against his former team, Poyer incurred a personal-foul penalty for a late fourth-quarter helmet-to-helmet hit on Bills receiver Keon Coleman. The hit injured Coleman and resulted in a 15-yard penalty on a third-down play, which set up Buffalo for a game-winning field goal. Poyer started 16 games for the Dolphins in 2024, receiving praise for his leadership in the locker room, though he did not record an interception for the second year in a row. He finished with 98 total tackles (51 solo) and 3 passes defensed on the season.

=== Buffalo Bills (second stint) ===
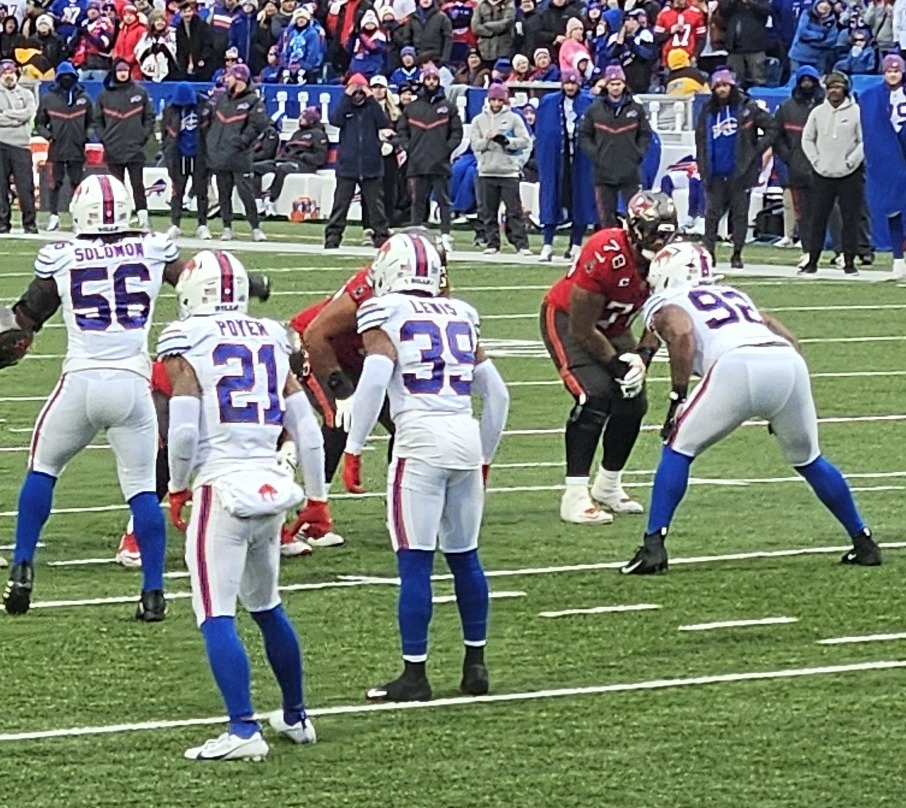
Poyer (#21) in action against the Tampa Bay Buccaneers in 2025

On August 27, 2025, Poyer signed with the Buffalo Bills' practice squad. Following Damar Hamlin being placed on injured reserve, Poyer was elevated to the active roster against the Atlanta Falcons in week 6. He was signed to the active roster on October 28. Becoming a starter once more, Poyer served as a mentor to fellow safeties Cole Bishop and Jordan Hancock, helping his younger teammates improve over the season. In the 2025 season, Poyer finished with a half-sack, 70 total tackles, one interception, and three passes defended.

== NFL career statistics ==
Legend
	Led the league
**Bold**	Career high

=== Regular season ===
Year	Team	Games		Tackles					Interceptions					Fumbles			
Year	Team	GP	GS	Cmb	Solo	Ast	Sck	TFL	Int	Yds	TD	Lng	PD	FF	FR	Yds	TD
2013	PHI	3	0	3	2	1	0.0	0	0	0	0	0	0	0	0	0	0
2013	CLE	9	0	18	18	0	0.0	0	0	0	0	0	0	0	0	0	0
2014	CLE	**16**	0	21	15	6	0.0	0	0	0	0	0	0	1	0	0	0
2015	CLE	14	4	43	28	15	1.0	1	2	24	0	12	4	0	1	4	0
2016	CLE	6	6	39	29	10	0.0	1	0	0	0	0	2	0	0	0	0
2017	BUF	15	15	95	63	32	2.0	4	**5**	33	**1**	19	**13**	0	1	**32**	0
2018	BUF	**16**	**16**	100	73	27	2.0	**9**	4	11	0	11	6	1	1	0	0
2019	BUF	**16**	**16**	107	71	36	1.0	4	2	0	0	0	3	**3**	**4**	31	0
2020	BUF	**16**	**16**	**124**	**91**	33	2.0	4	2	14	0	14	5	2	0	0	0
2021	BUF	**16**	**16**	93	66	27	**3.0**	8	**5**	**87**	0	**26**	9	0	0	0	0
2022	BUF	12	12	63	44	19	0.0	4	4	6	0	6	8	1	0	0	0
2023	BUF	**16**	**16**	100	66	34	1.0	2	0	0	0	0	4	1	0	0	0
2024	MIA	**16**	**16**	98	51	**47**	0.0	0	0	0	0	0	3	0	0	0	0
2025	BUF	10	9	70	31	39	0.5	1	1	10	0	10	3	0	0	0	0
Career		181	142	974	648	326	12.5	38	25	185	1	26	60	9	7	67	0

=== Playoffs ===
Year	Team	Games		Tackles					Interceptions					Fumbles			
Year	Team	GP	GS	Cmb	Solo	Ast	Sck	TFL	Int	Yds	TD	Lng	PD	FF	FR	Yds	TD
2017	BUF	1	1	5	3	2	0.0	0	0	0	0	0	0	0	0	0	0
2019	BUF	1	1	6	1	**5**	0.0	0	0	0	0	0	0	0	0	0	0
2020	BUF	**3**	**3**	**20**	**16**	4	0.0	**1**	0	0	0	0	0	0	0	0	0
2021	BUF	2	2	10	5	**5**	0.0	0	0	0	0	0	0	**1**	0	0	0
2022	BUF	2	2	9	5	4	0.0	0	0	0	0	0	0	0	0	0	0
2023	BUF	2	2	14	9	**5**	0.0	0	0	0	0	0	0	**1**	0	0	0
2025	BUF	1	1	2	2	0	0.0	0	0	0	0	0	0	0	0	0	0
Career		12	12	66	41	25	0.0	1	0	0	0	0	0	2	0	0	0

== Personal life ==
Poyer was raised in Astoria, Oregon, by his mother, Julie Poyer, and stepfather, Fa'alaeo Poyer. He majored in elementary education at Oregon State. His mother and stepfather both attended Eastern New Mexico University. His mother transferred to Eastern New Mexico for volleyball and his stepfather played tight end for their football team. Poyer's grandfather, Lynn Baxter, played basketball for Oregon State.

On December 30, 2016, Poyer and his girlfriend, Rachel Bush, had a baby girl they named Aliyah. Bush is an Instagram model and met Poyer through Twitter. They began dating in 2015 and were married on February 17, 2018, in a ceremony in Jamaica.

Poyer holds the annual "Jordan Poyer Football Camp" in his hometown of Astoria, Oregon, for local youth.

Poyer opened up about his struggles with alcohol with a post on Instagram in March 2021, especially after a bitter loss in the 2019–20 NFL playoffs. He has stayed sober since March 2020 after realizing the effects that his continued drinking would inflict on his family, career, and health. Since then, Poyer has devoted his time off the field to work with others struggling with alcoholism. He followed up with a piece on The Players' Tribune in November 2021.
