= Astoria School District =

School district in Oregon, USA

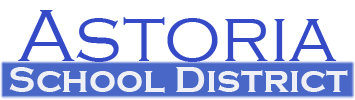

The Astoria School District is a school district in the U.S. state of Oregon that serves the city of Astoria. It has five schools, which each serve a different age group of students.

In addition to Astoria, the district includes Jeffers Gardens and River Point.

== Demographics ==
In the 2009 school year, the district had 41 students classified as homeless by the Department of Education, or 2.2% of students in the district.

== Schools ==
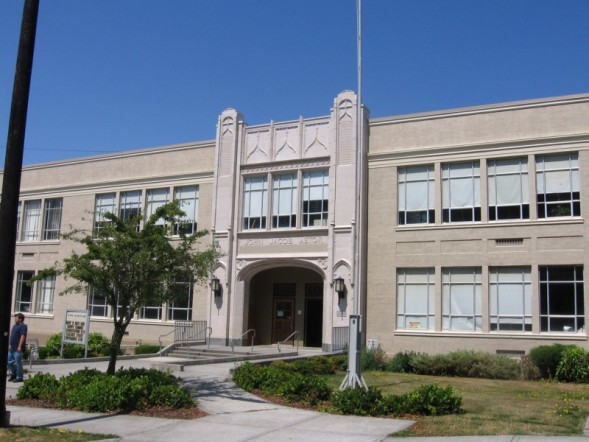
John Jacob Astor Elementary

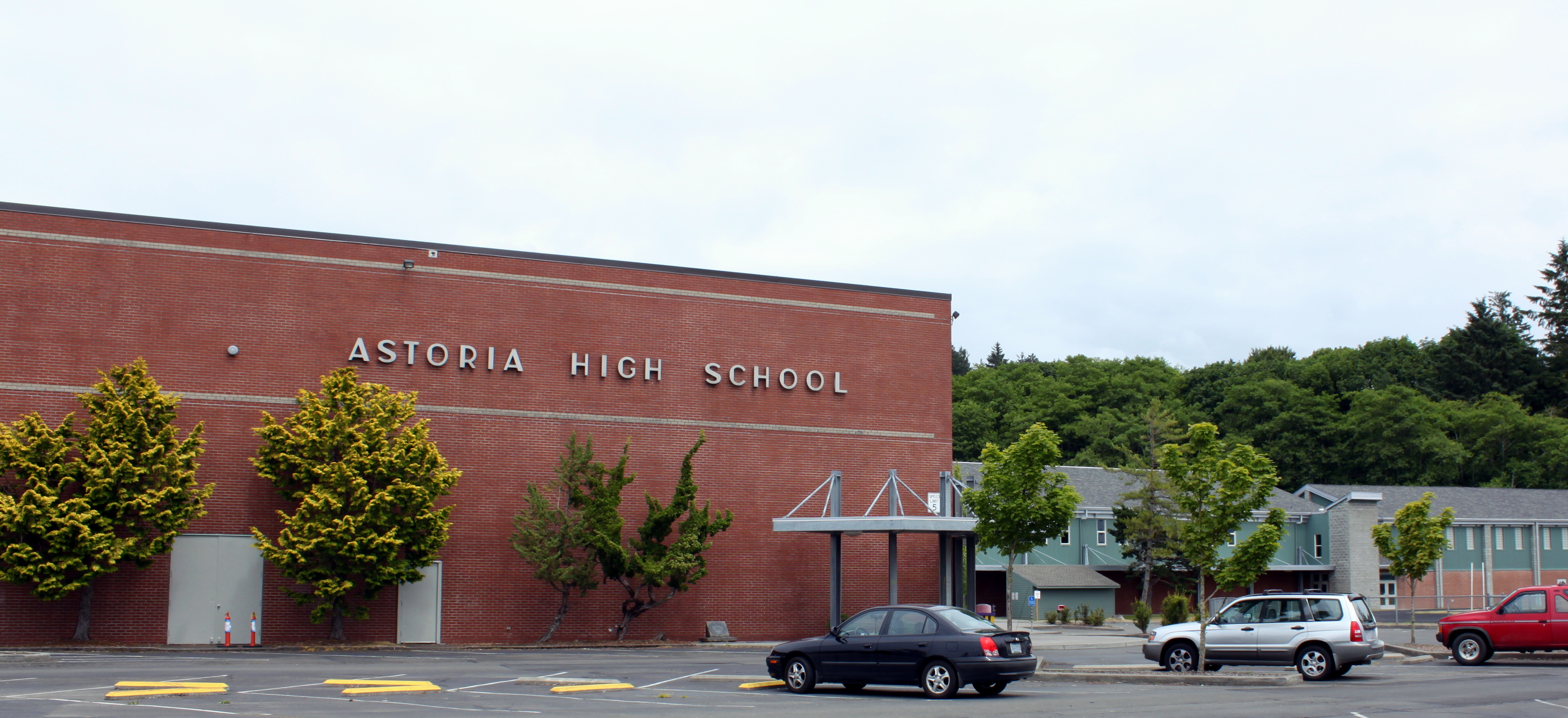
Astoria High School

Gray Elementary

Gray Elementary is the school district's kindergarten school. It was named after Robert Gray, the merchant sea-captain who was the first white man to enter the Columbia River. In 2006 there were approximately 140 students enrolled.

Astor Elementary

Named after John Jacob Astor, who is also the namesake of Astoria, this school serves grades 1-3 and in 2006 had approximately 400 enrolled students. It served as the site for the 1990 film Kindergarten Cop, one of several locations within Astoria which have been used for movies.

Lewis and Clark School

This school is located across Young's Bay from the majority of Astoria. Grades 3-5 are taught here, and in 2006 there were about 400 students in attendance. Lewis and Clark school was in existence the 1950s. Until at least 1980 the school taught kindergarten through 8th grade.

Astoria Middle School

Astoria Middle School contains grades 6-8 and had approximately 292 students as of 2012. Although it does not belong to any sports leagues, its students still participate in club sports such as the Astoria Vikings.

Astoria High School

Astoria High School was built in 1960. Home to 780 students and 39 staff, this school serves 9th through 12th grades. After undergoing renovation in 2003 it added a new Applied Science Center specializing in aquatic biology. This school is also home to the 2006 3A Baseball State Champions.

== See also ==
- List of school districts in Oregon
