= Royal Nebeker =

American painter

Royal Gay Nebeker (February 22, 1945 – September 6, 2014) was an American painter and print maker born in San Francisco whose prints and paintings have been shown widely in Europe and North America including in Art Paris at the Louvre, Gallery Steen in Oslo and the Lisa Harris Gallery in Seattle. His formal education in art included a Masters Diploma from the National School of Arts & Crafts in Oslo, an M.F.A. from Brigham Young University, and a sabbatical with Japanese printmaker Yashi Ishibashi and papermaker Naoaki Sakamoto. Nebeker was friends with Gary Snyder and Robert Redford. His art has been collected by IBM, the National Gallery of Art in Krakow, Poland, the U.C.L.A. print collection and the Seattle Art Museum, among others.

Nebeker's mother emigrated from Norway where Nebeker eventually traveled as a missionary for the Church of Jesus Christ of Latter-day Saints. While there he studied at the National School of Arts & Crafts in Oslo where he felt the influence of Edvard Munch. In 1972, Nebeker received a grant to live and work in Munch's Ekley Studio. Aside from multiple residencies and extended travel to Europe and Asia, from 1974 until his death in 2014, he lived in Gearhart, Oregon, and painted in a studio on pilings over the Columbia River called The Uppertown Net Loft. He stated that Astoria reminded him of Norway.

During The Great Coastal Gale of 2007, the upper floor of the studio was blown off, and Nebeker lost two years worth of his paintings. He and a friend, who broke his arm when the building lost its top, were trapped there for twenty hours in the midst of 160-miles-per-hour winds. They finally escaped by lashing themselves to a ladder and crawling to safety.

Nebeker's paintings include dream-like images (often collaged with posters and handbills from his travels), and quotes from: Kierkegaard, songs, scripture, and Ibsen, among others. His painting themes include pairings of a man and a woman, dream depictions, memories of childhood, bicycles, and boats. Iconic figures like George Washington often appear. There is also frequent depiction of a woman called Blinky in a 19th-century polka dotted bathing dress. According to the art critic Richard V. West, she is both an avatar of Nebeker's wife Sarah and an appropriation of the work of Paul Gavarni.

Nebeker kept a dream journal, a source for some of his work. There is a clear influence from expressionism, but Nebeker is less cynical and more humorous in the treatment of his subjects. In his self portraits, he sometimes portrayed himself as a woman. Asked why he often painted words and phrases in Japanese and Norwegian on his work, Nebeker responded, "I don't like the way English looks, it is so blatant. It is too easy to take literally, too easy to see what it means. I don't intentionally obscure meaning, but I distrust clarity." The last of his painted work often exceeded six foot dimensions. The painting "When We Awaken" at 142 by 104 inches was initially smaller, but Nebeker felt the two figures rising from a tomb needed more sky above them and added a canvas on top which mostly holds more sky.

Nebeker's smaller mixed media watercolors often depict flowers in vases. He was challenged to pursue this work by Horst Janssen when they met in the 1970s.

He is the father of Israel Nebeker, lead singer of the band Blind Pilot.
