= Clatsop County, Oregon =

County in Oregon, United States

- County
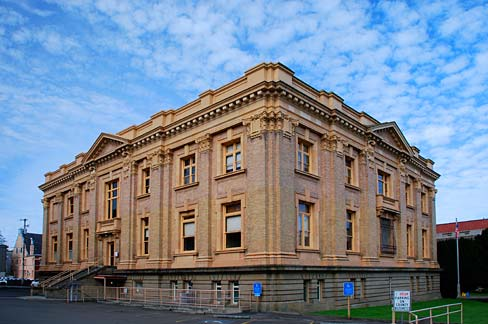
- Clatsop County Courthouse in Astoria

- Seal

- Location within the U.S. state of Oregon
- Coordinates: 46.01°N 123.71°W
- Country: United States
- State: Oregon
- Founded: June 22, 1844
- Named for: Clatsop Tribe
- Seat: Astoria
- Largest city: Astoria

Area
  - Total: 1,084 sq mi (2,810 km^{2})
  - Land: 829 sq mi (2,150 km^{2})
  - Water: 255 sq mi (660 km^{2}) 24%

Population (2020)
  - Total: 41,072
  - Estimate (2025): 40,926 ▼
  - Density: 38/sq mi (15/km^{2})
- Congressional district: 1st
- Website: www.clatsopcounty.gov

Map of Clatsop County

Clatsop County (/ˈklætsəp/) is the northernmost county in the U.S. state of Oregon. As of the 2020 census, the population was 41,072. The county seat is Astoria. The county is named for the Clatsop tribe of Native Americans, who lived along the coast of the Pacific Ocean prior to European settlement. Clatsop County comprises the Astoria, OR Micropolitan Statistical Area, or Sunset Empire, and is located in Northwest Oregon.

== History ==
The Lewis and Clark Expedition stayed for the winter of 1805–06 in the area, establishing Fort Clatsop as one of the earliest American structures on the west coast of North America. Astoria, Oregon's oldest settlement, was established as a fur trading post in 1811 and named after John Jacob Astor.

Clatsop County was created from the northern and western portions of the original Twality District on June 22, 1844. Until the creation of Vancouver District five days later, Clatsop County extended north across the Columbia into present-day Washington. The Provisional and Territorial Legislatures further altered Clatsop County's boundaries in 1845 and 1853.

Before 1850 most of Clatsop County's government activity occurred in Lexington, a community located where Warrenton is now. However, commercial and social activities came to center on Astoria as that city grew, and an election in 1854 chose Astoria to be the new county seat.

Fort Stevens, located near the peninsula formed by the south shore of the Columbia river and the Pacific Ocean, became the only continental US military installation attacked in World War II, when submarine I-25 of the Imperial Japanese Navy fired 17 rounds at the base on June 21, 1942. The submarine escaped when the order was given not to return fire with the 10-inch (250 mm) shore guns. While the damage caused was slight (reportedly only a baseball backstop was damaged and a powerline severed), the presence of the enemy ship sowed panic along the Pacific coast of the United States, and other minor attacks occurred elsewhere in the region, including Vancouver Island.

In 1975, Clatsop County commissioners considered seceding from Oregon and becoming a part of Washington. The movement was based on disagreements residents of the county had with Governor Bob Straub. The movement was created after Alumax Corporation canceled their plans to build a plant in the county. Some residents, including two county commissioners, blamed the Oregon Governor for the relocation of the plant. The State of Washington's Governor, Daniel J. Evans, said the county was not welcome in the state and Clatsop County commissioners later abandoned the idea.

== Geography ==
According to the United States Census Bureau, the county has a total area of 1,084 square miles (2,810 km^{2}), of which 829 square miles (2,150 km^{2}) is land and 255 square miles (660 km^{2}), or 24%, is water. The highest point is Saddle Mountain at 3,283 feet (1,001 m), part of the Northern Oregon Coast Range.

=== Adjacent counties ===
- Pacific County, Washington (north)
- Wahkiakum County, Washington (north/northeast)
- Columbia County (east)
- Washington County (southeast)
- Tillamook County (south)

=== Major highways ===
- U.S. Route 26
- U.S. Route 30
- U.S. Route 101

=== National protected areas ===
- Julia Butler Hansen National Wildlife Refuge (part)
- Lewis and Clark National Historical Park (part)
- Lewis and Clark National Wildlife Refuge
- Oregon Islands National Wildlife Refuge (part)

== Ecology ==
Clatsop County is home to a number of plant species that are rare or endemic, including Agrostis swalalahos, Cardamine pattersonii, Carex macrochaeta, Castilleja chambersii, Erigeron peregrinus var. peregrinus, and Saxifraga hitchcockiana.

== Demographics ==
Historical population
Census	Pop.	Note	%±
1850	462		—
1860	498		7.8%
1870	1,255		152.0%
1880	7,222		475.5%
1890	10,016		38.7%
1900	12,765		27.4%
1910	16,106		26.2%
1920	23,030		43.0%
1930	21,124		−8.3%
1940	24,697		16.9%
1950	30,776		24.6%
1960	27,380		−11.0%
1970	28,473		4.0%
1980	32,489		14.1%
1990	33,301		2.5%
2000	35,630		7.0%
2010	37,039		4.0%
2020	41,072		10.9%
2025 (est.)	40,926	▼	−0.4%
U.S. Decennial Census; 1790–1960 1900–1990; 1990–2000 2010–2020

=== 2020 census ===
As of the 2020 census, the county had a population of 41,072. Of the residents, 19.0% were under the age of 18 and 23.8% were 65 years of age or older; the median age was 44.6 years. For every 100 females there were 97.8 males, and for every 100 females age 18 and over there were 96.2 males. 60.9% of residents lived in urban areas and 39.1% lived in rural areas.

The racial makeup of the county was 84.1% White, 0.6% Black or African American, 1.0% American Indian and Alaska Native, 1.4% Asian, 0.3% Native Hawaiian and Pacific Islander, 4.0% from some other race, and 8.8% from two or more races. Hispanic or Latino residents of any race comprised 9.4% of the population.

There were 17,533 households in the county, of which 24.3% had children under the age of 18 living with them and 26.6% had a female householder with no spouse or partner present. About 30.9% of all households were made up of individuals and 15.6% had someone living alone who was 65 years of age or older.

There were 23,017 housing units, of which 23.8% were vacant. Among occupied housing units, 62.1% were owner-occupied and 37.9% were renter-occupied. The homeowner vacancy rate was 2.0% and the rental vacancy rate was 6.3%.

Clatsop County, Oregon – Racial and ethnic composition Note: the US Census treats Hispanic/Latino as an ethnic category. This table excludes Latinos from the racial categories and assigns them to a separate category. Hispanics/Latinos may be of any race.
Race / Ethnicity (NH = Non-Hispanic)	Pop 1980	Pop 1990	Pop 2000	Pop 2010	Pop 2020	% 1980	% 1990	% 2000	% 2010	% 2020
White alone (NH)	31,078	31,756	32,364	32,295	33,526	95.66%	95.36%	90.83%	87.19%	81.63%
Black or African American alone (NH)	167	99	156	163	224	0.51%	0.30%	0.44%	0.44%	0.55%
Native American or Alaska Native alone (NH)	247	361	342	308	344	0.76%	1.08%	0.96%	0.83%	0.84%
Asian alone (NH)	442	419	423	445	552	1.36%	1.26%	1.19%	1.20%	1.34%
Native Hawaiian or Pacific Islander alone (NH)	x	x	50	84	91	x	x	0.14%	0.23%	0.22%
Other race alone (NH)	109	18	14	48	231	0.34%	0.05%	0.04%	0.13%	0.56%
Mixed race or Multiracial (NH)	x	x	684	858	2,256	x	x	1.92%	2.32%	5.49%
Hispanic or Latino (any race)	446	648	1,597	2,838	3,848	1.37%	1.95%	4.48%	7.66%	9.37%
Total	32,489	33,301	35,630	37,039	41,072	100.00%	100.00%	100.00%	100.00%	100.00%

=== American Community Survey 2025 data ===
The United States Census Bureau estimated that in 2025, Clatsop County’s population was 40.926. It was also estimated that the county's population was 80,18% Non-Hispanic White, 11,71% Hispanic or Latino, 0,66% Non-Hispanic Black, 1,70% Asian, 0,83% Native American, 0,30% Pacific Islander, and 4,62% Multiracial.

Total	Population	Percentage
Non-Hispanic White	32.813	80,18%
Hispanic or Latino	4.791	11,71%
Non-Hispanic Black	272	0,66%
Asian	697	1,70%
Native American	340	0,83%
Pacific Islander	123	0,30%
Non-Hispanic Multiracial	1.890	4,62%

=== 2010 census ===
As of the 2010 census, there were 37,039 people, 15,742 households, and 9,579 families living in the county. The population density was 44.7 inhabitants per square mile (17.3/km^{2}). There were 21,546 housing units at an average density of 26.0 units per square mile (10.0 units/km^{2}). The racial makeup of the county was 90.9% white, 1.2% Asian, 1.0% American Indian, 0.5% black or African American, 0.2% Pacific islander, 3.3% from other races, and 2.8% from two or more races. Those of Hispanic or Latino origin made up 7.7% of the population. In terms of ancestry, 22.8% were German, 15.4% were English, 14.2% were Irish, 8.9% were American, and 7.5% were Norwegian.

Of the 15,742 households, 26.0% had children under the age of 18 living with them, 46.4% were married couples living together, 9.6% had a female householder with no husband present, 39.2% were non-families, and 31.5% of all households were made up of individuals. The average household size was 2.29 and the average family size was 2.85. The median age was 43.2 years.

The median income for a household in the county was $42,223 and the median income for a family was $52,339. Males had a median income of $40,741 versus $28,463 for females. The per capita income for the county was $25,347. About 9.6% of families and 12.8% of the population were below the poverty line, including 20.0% of those under age 18 and 6.6% of those age 65 or over.

=== 2000 census ===
As of the 2000 census, there were 35,630 people, 14,703 households, and 9,454 families living in the county. The population density was 43 people per square mile (17 people/km^{2}). There were 19,685 housing units at an average density of 24 units per square mile (9.3/km^{2}). The racial makeup of the county was 93.14% White or European American, 0.52% Black or African American, 1.03% Native American, 1.21% Asian, 0.17% Pacific Islander, 1.64% from other races, and 2.30% from two or more races. 4.48% of the population were Hispanic or Latino of any race. 15.3% were of German, 10.8% English, 10.4% Irish, 9.3% American and 6.5% Norwegian ancestry.

There were 14,703 households, out of which 28.50% had children under the age of 18 living with them, 50.60% were married couples living together, 9.70% had a female householder with no husband present, and 35.70% were non-families. 29.50% of all households were made up of individuals, and 11.70% had someone living alone who was 65 years of age or older. The average household size was 2.35 and the average family size was 2.88.

In the county, the population was spread out, with 23.70% under the age of 18, 8.90% from 18 to 24, 25.30% from 25 to 44, 26.60% from 45 to 64, and 15.60% who were 65 years of age or older. The median age was 40 years. For every 100 females there were 97.80 males. For every 100 females age 18 and over, there were 95.10 males.

The median income for a household in the county was $36,301, and the median income for a family was $44,575. Males had a median income of $32,153 versus $22,479 for females. The per capita income for the county was $19,515. About 9.10% of families and 13.20% of the population were below the poverty line, including 16.80% of those under age 18 and 8.00% of those age 65 or over.

== Economy ==
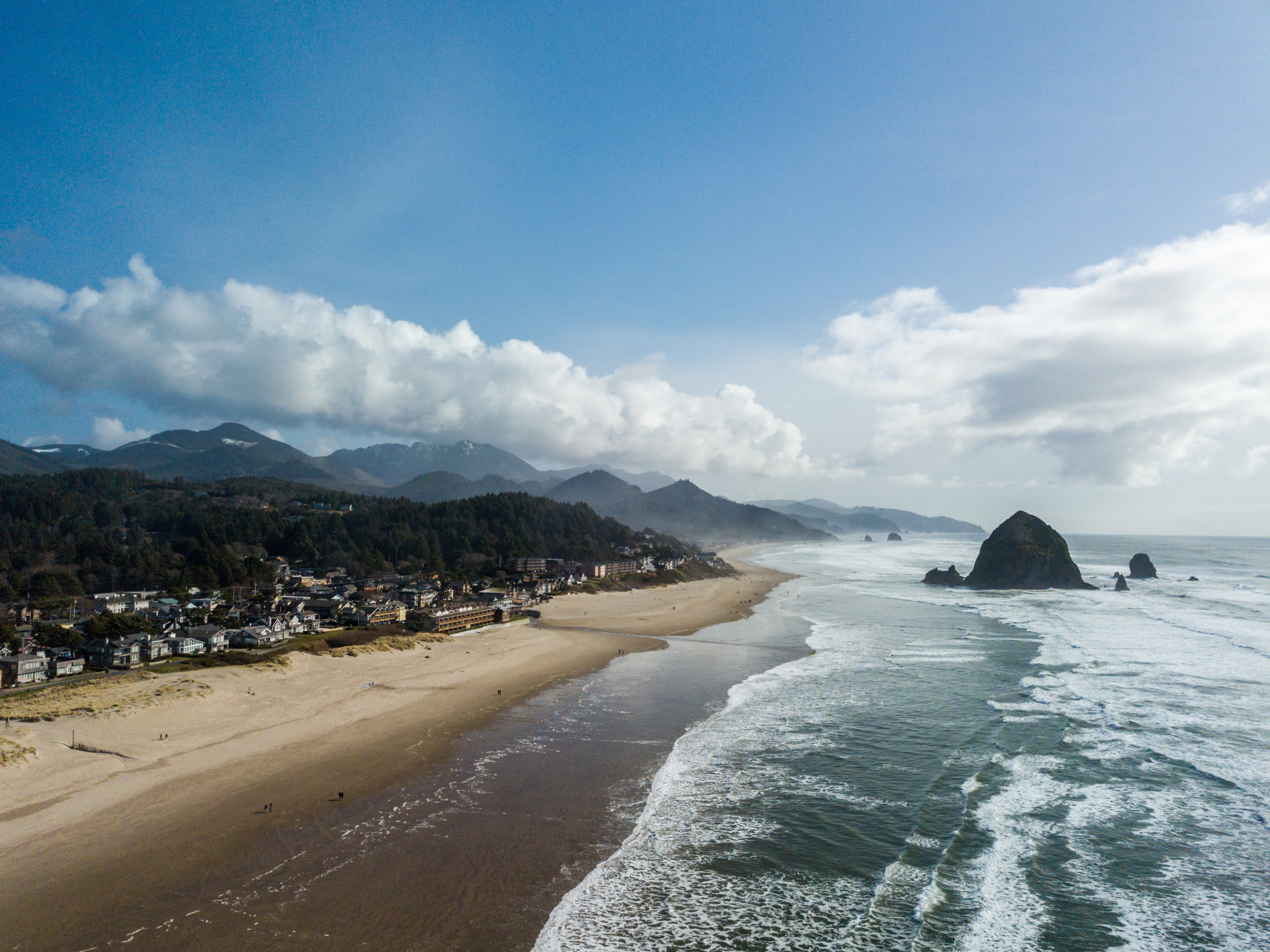
Haystack Rock in Cannon Beach is a popular tourist destination in Oregon.

The principal industries of Clatsop County are manufacturing, travel (primarily tourism), and trade. Fishing and timber are still important but contribute proportionally less to the county's employment and income than they used to. The county's average nonfarm employment was 17,480 in 2007. About 30% of the lands within the county boundaries belong to the state of Oregon, as part of the state forests. The Port of Astoria was created in 1914 to support trade and commerce.

=== Tourism ===
Astoria, Oregon, the county seat, has multiple tourist attractions including the Astoria Riverfront Trolley, Fort Clatsop, the Uppertown Firefighters Museum, and Columbia River Maritime Museum. Seaside, Oregon, noted as Oregon's oldest ocean resort community, also has multiple tourist attractions, including the Seaside Aquarium, and the Seaside Historical Society Museum. Tourism is noted as one of the major forces in Clatsop County's economy.

== Communities ==
=== Cities ===
- Astoria (county seat)
- Cannon Beach
- Gearhart
- Hammond (former)
- Seaside
- Warrenton

=== Census-designated places ===
- Jeffers Garden
- Knappa
- River Point
- Svensen
- Westport

=== Unincorporated communities ===
- Arch Cape
- Bradwood
- Brownsmead
- Carnahan
- Clifton
- Elsie
- Fern Hill
- Fort Stevens
- Grand Rapids
- Hamlet
- Jeffers Garden
- Jewell
- Jewell Junction
- Lukarilla
- Melville
- Miles Crossing
- Mishawaka
- Navy Heights
- Necanicum
- Oklahoma Hill
- Olney
- Sunset Beach
- Surf Pines
- Svensen Junction
- Taylorville
- Tolovana Park
- Tongue Point Village
- Vesper
- Vinemaple
- Wauna

=== Former unincorporated communities ===
- Hammond
- Skipanon

=== Population ranking ===
The population ranking of the following table is based on the 2020 census of Clatsop County.

† county seat

Rank	City/Town/etc.	Municipal type	Population (2020 Census)
1	† Astoria	City	10,181
2	Seaside	City	7,160
3	Warrenton	City	6,277
4	Gearhart	City	1,811
5	Cannon Beach	City	1,489
6	Knappa	CDP	1,007
7	Svensen	CDP	853
8	River Point	CDP	397
9	Westport	CDP	319
10	Jeffers Gardens	CDP	312
11	Barnsdale	CDP	188

== Politics ==
Like all of the northern Oregon coast, Clatsop County was consistently Republican up to and including the 1928 election, except in 1912 when third-party former President Theodore Roosevelt won by one vote with the lowest percentage for a winning candidate in any county since the Civil War. Since Franklin D. Roosevelt won the county in 1932, Clatsop has generally been carried by the Democratic candidate in presidential elections. The only exception to this is Dwight D. Eisenhower, who won the county twice, thereby making this Oregon county the one to have gone the longest without supporting a Republican nominee. However, George McGovern won it by just nineteen votes in 1972, and Walter Mondale by a mere three votes (or 0.02 percent) in 1984.

In gubernatorial elections, the county has been won by the Democratic Party candidate since 1982, starting with a streak of seven consecutive elections with the Democratic Party carrying Clatsop County. That winning streak ended in 2014, with the GOP gubernatorial candidate, Dennis Richardson, unexpectedly carrying Clatsop with a final vote total of 6,550 votes (46.33 percent) for the Republican and 6,449 votes (45.62 percent) cast for the Democrat and future governor-elect John Kitzhaber.

Clatsop County is located in Oregon's 1st congressional district, which has a Cook Partisan Voting Index of D+18 and is represented by Suzanne Bonamici. In the Oregon State Senate, it is represented by Republican Suzanne Weber. In the Oregon House of Representatives, it is represented by Democrat Cyrus Javadi, a former Republican who switched parties in September 2025.

United States presidential election results for Clatsop County, Oregon
Year	Republican		Democratic		Third party(ies)	
Year	No.	%	No.	%	No.	%
1880	536	55.26%	434	44.74%	0	0.00%
1884	872	56.22%	670	43.20%	9	0.58%
1888	1,060	60.30%	647	36.80%	51	2.90%
1892	1,148	48.89%	713	30.37%	487	20.74%
1896	1,849	60.56%	1,135	37.18%	69	2.26%
1900	1,329	62.63%	688	32.42%	105	4.95%
1904	1,408	68.68%	336	16.39%	306	14.93%
1908	1,482	59.78%	658	26.54%	339	13.67%
1912	722	26.98%	728	27.20%	1,226	45.81%
1916	2,568	49.44%	2,239	43.11%	387	7.45%
1920	3,498	61.40%	1,687	29.61%	512	8.99%
1924	3,313	56.33%	1,373	23.35%	1,195	20.32%
1928	4,087	63.33%	2,208	34.21%	159	2.46%
1932	2,570	34.46%	4,473	59.98%	414	5.55%
1936	2,261	25.60%	6,267	70.96%	304	3.44%
1940	3,758	35.74%	6,686	63.59%	70	0.67%
1944	3,921	39.09%	6,038	60.19%	72	0.72%
1948	5,076	44.87%	5,574	49.27%	663	5.86%
1952	7,569	56.02%	5,814	43.03%	128	0.95%
1956	6,616	50.94%	6,372	49.06%	0	0.00%
1960	6,286	48.86%	6,530	50.75%	50	0.39%
1964	4,023	32.41%	8,371	67.44%	19	0.15%
1968	5,810	45.61%	6,243	49.01%	685	5.38%
1972	5,998	47.43%	6,017	47.58%	632	5.00%
1976	6,178	45.37%	6,690	49.13%	748	5.49%
1980	6,124	40.94%	6,482	43.33%	2,353	15.73%
1984	7,522	49.86%	7,525	49.88%	38	0.25%
1988	5,956	41.60%	8,074	56.40%	286	2.00%
1992	4,683	27.86%	7,700	45.80%	4,429	26.34%
1996	5,334	34.63%	7,732	50.19%	2,339	15.18%
2000	6,950	42.19%	8,296	50.36%	1,228	7.45%
2004	8,503	44.04%	10,461	54.18%	345	1.79%
2008	7,192	38.78%	10,701	57.69%	655	3.53%
2012	7,249	40.68%	9,861	55.34%	708	3.97%
2016	8,138	41.39%	9,252	47.05%	2,274	11.56%
2020	10,218	42.74%	12,916	54.02%	776	3.25%
2024	9,913	42.56%	12,533	53.81%	844	3.62%

== Education ==
School districts include:

- Astoria School District 1
- Clatskanie School District 6J
- Jewell School District 8
- Knappa School District 4
- Seaside School District 10
- Warrenton-Hammond School District 30

Clatsop County is in the boundary of Clatsop Community College.

== See also ==
- National Register of Historic Places listings in Clatsop County, Oregon
