= Clatsop Community College =

College in Clatsop County, Oregon, U.S.

- Type: Public community college
- Established: 1958; 68 years ago
- President: Jarrod Hogue
- Location: Astoria, Oregon, U.S. 46.1837°N 123.8246°W
- Nickname: Bandits
- Website: www.clatsopcc.edu

Clatsop Community College (CCC) is a public community college with facilities in Astoria and Seaside, Oregon. The college's service area includes Clatsop County, portions of Columbia and Tillamook counties and Pacific and Wahkiakum counties in Washington state.

== History ==
CCC was established under the direction of the Astoria Board of Education in 1958 and constitutes Oregon's first community college. The original curriculum included two years of classes that could be transferred and two year sequences in Electronics, Business, Automotive and Building Construction. In 1962, Clatsop County residents voted to form a county-wide education district and separate the college from the school district. Renovation of the former Astoria High School began in June 1962 and this facility became the home of CCC.

In October 2008, the college broke ground on the Jerome Campus Redevelopment project. This project, now complete, resulted in the renovation of Towler Hall (the former Astoria High School), renovation of Patriot Hall and the construction of Columbia Hall. .

== Accreditation ==
Clatsop Community College is accredited by the Northwest Commission on Colleges and Universities (NWCCU).

== Facilities ==
CCC's main campus in Astoria is located on a hillside overlooking the Columbia River. The campus includes the Royal Nebeker Art Center Gallery that hosts approximately six exhibits annually. In addition, the college operates a second campus with maritime, fire and technical programs (MERTS), as well as an Industrial & Manufacturing Technology Center (IMTC). The MERTS campus is located east of Astoria and Tongue Point on the Columbia River.

As part of its maritime science program, CCC maintains and operates the training vessel Forerunner.

Small business and economic development services, along with ESL, GED, and vocational classes, are conducted at the South County Center in Seaside.

== See also ==
- List of Oregon community colleges
