= Peter L. Cherry House =

Historic house in Oregon, United States

- U.S. National Register of Historic Places
- U.S. Historic district – Contributing property
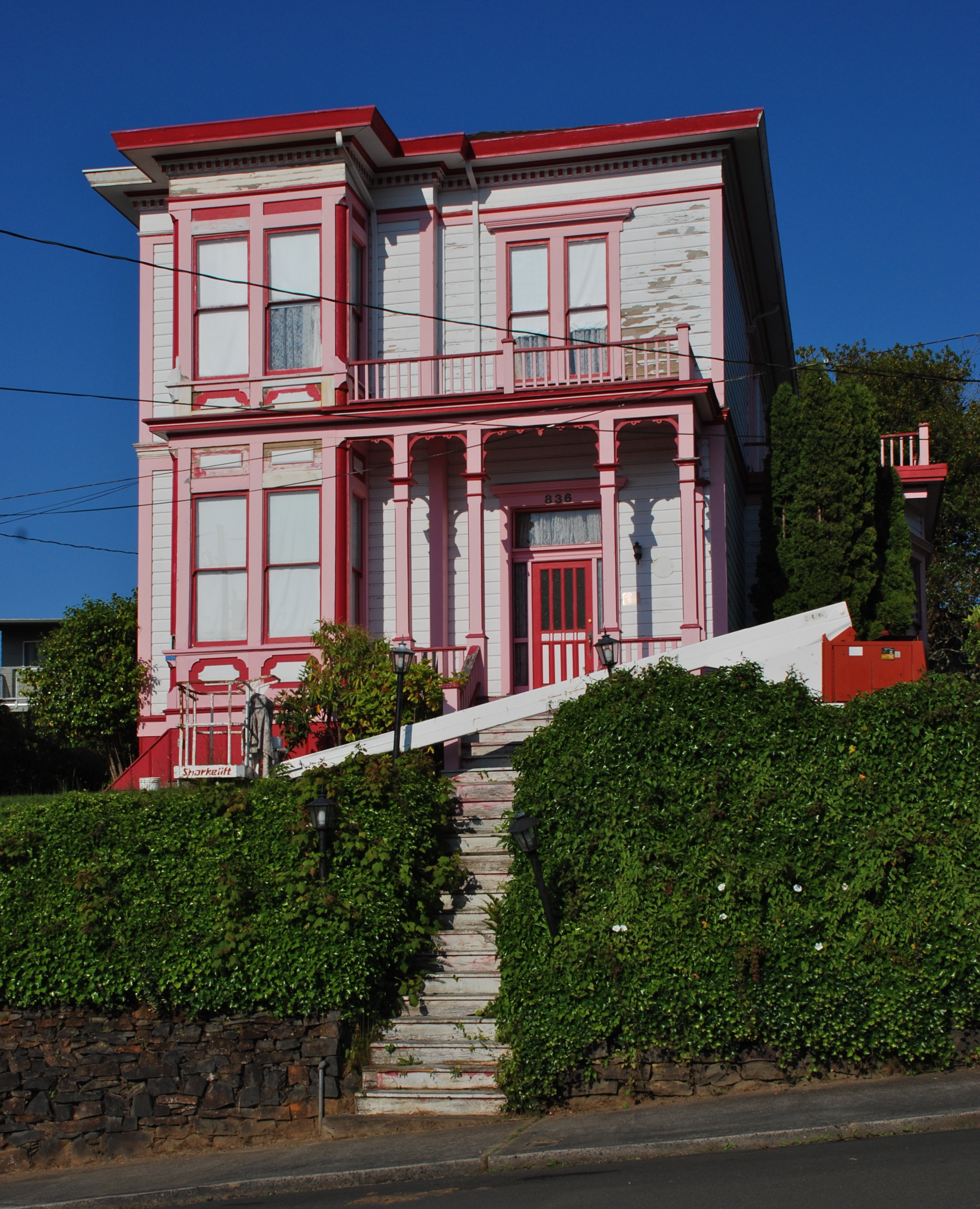
- The Cherry House in 2012.

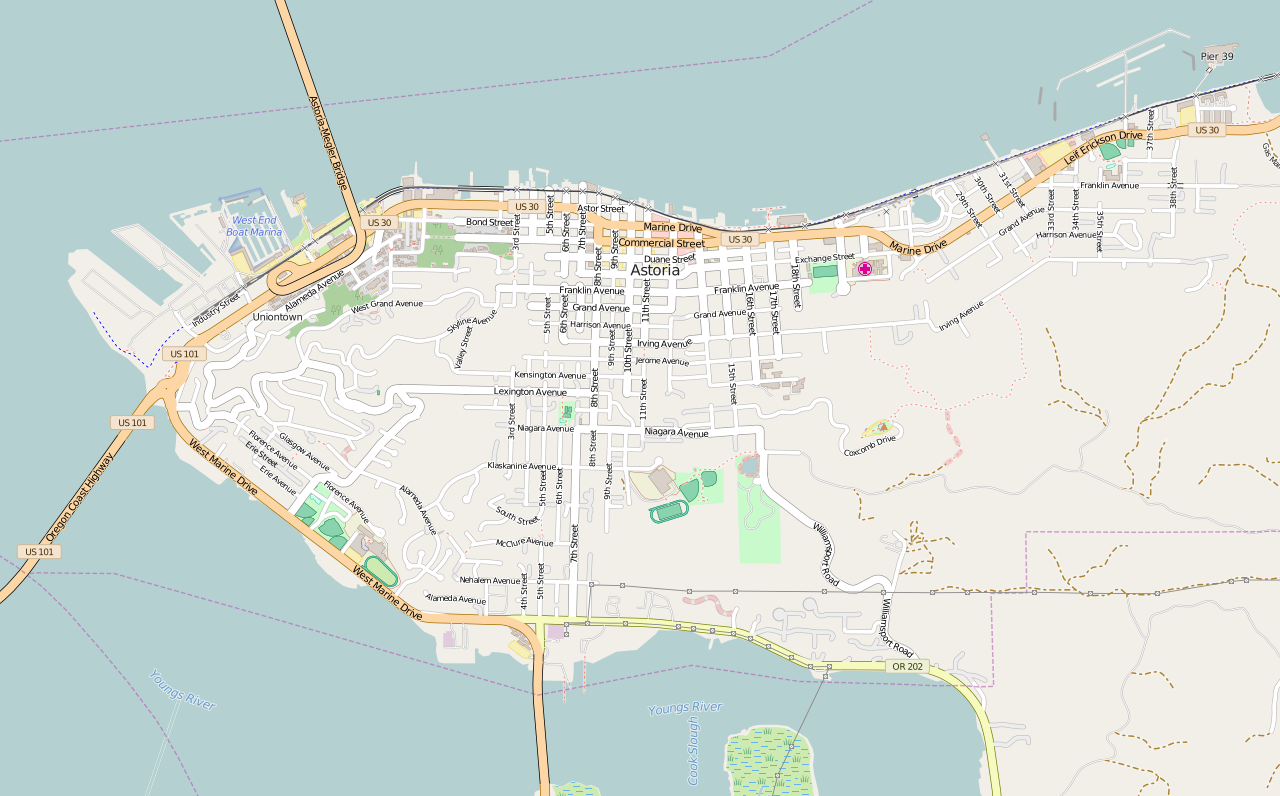
- Location within Astoria OR
- Location: 836 15th Street; Astoria, Oregon
- Coordinates: 46°11′08″N 123°49′35″W
- Built: 1882
- Architectural style: Italianate
- Part of: Shively–McClure Historic District (ID05000829)
- NRHP reference No.: 84002952
- Added to NRHP: September 7, 1984

The Peter L. Cherry House is a house located in Astoria, Oregon, listed on the National Register of Historic Places.

== See also ==
- National Register of Historic Places listings in Clatsop County, Oregon
