= John N. Griffin House =

Historic house in Oregon, United States

- U.S. National Register of Historic Places
- U.S. Historic district – Contributing property
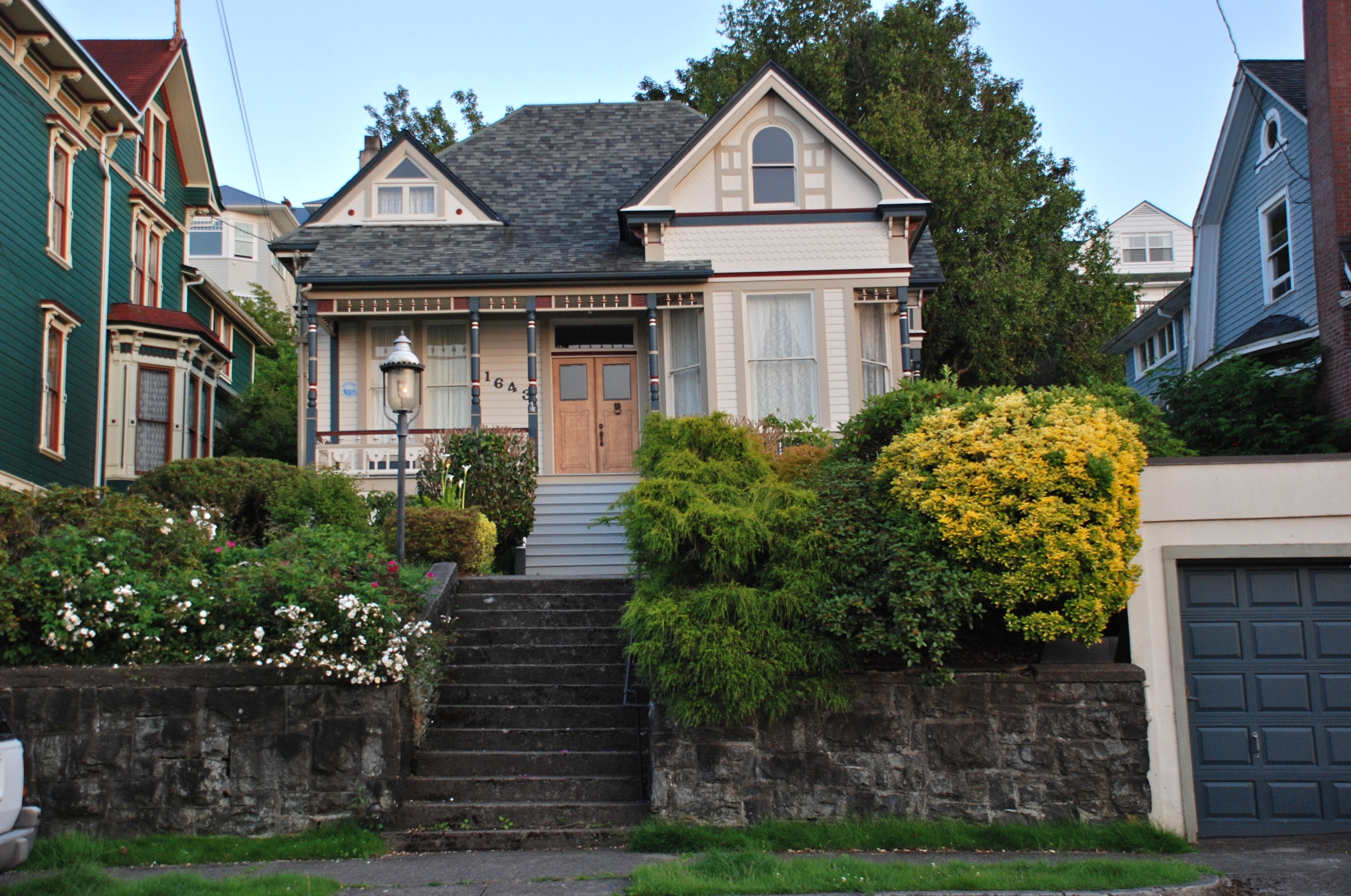
- The Griffin House in 2012

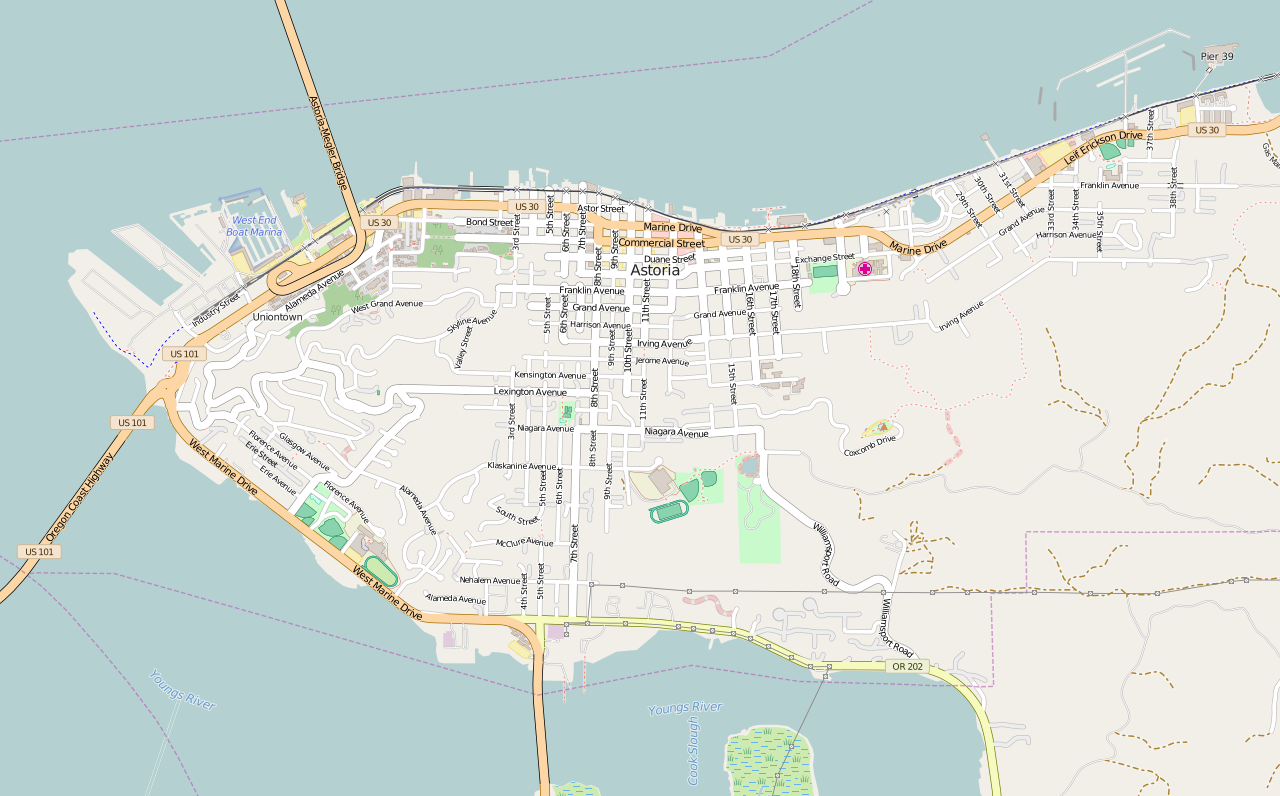
- Location within Astoria OR
- Location: 1643 Grand Avenue; Astoria, Oregon
- Coordinates: 46°11′09″N 123°49′29″W
- Area: Less than 1 acre (0.40 ha)
- Built: 1892
- Built by: James Ernest Ferguson
- Architectural style: Queen Anne/Stick
- Part of: Shively–McClure Historic District (ID05000829)
- NRHP reference No.: 84000119
- Added to NRHP: October 25, 1984

The John N. Griffin House is a historic residence located in Astoria, Oregon, United States.

The house was listed on the National Register of Historic Places in 1984.

== See also ==
- National Register of Historic Places listings in Clatsop County, Oregon
