= Charles Stevens House =

Historic house in Oregon, United States

- U.S. National Register of Historic Places
- U.S. Historic district – Contributing property
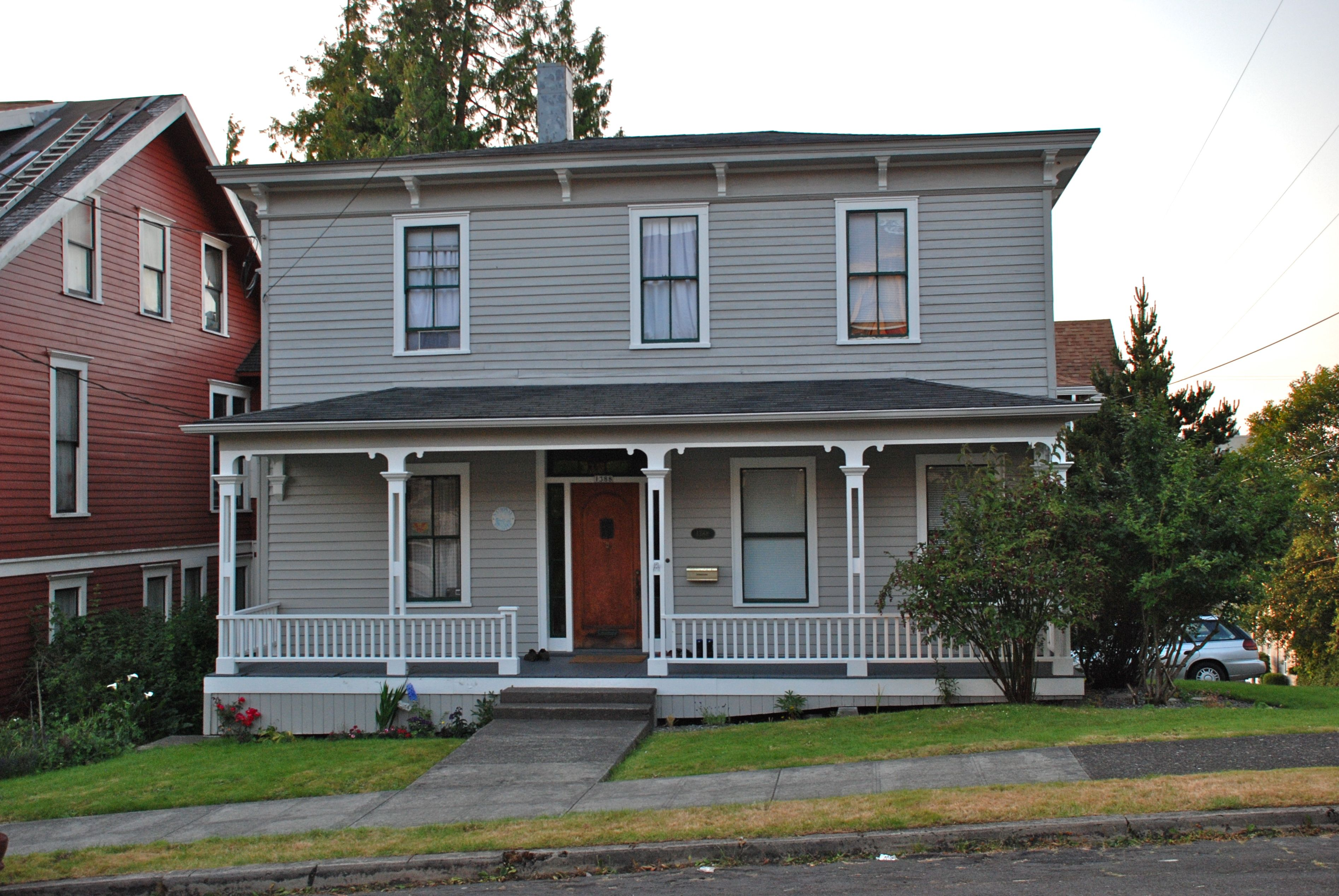
- The house's front exterior in 2012

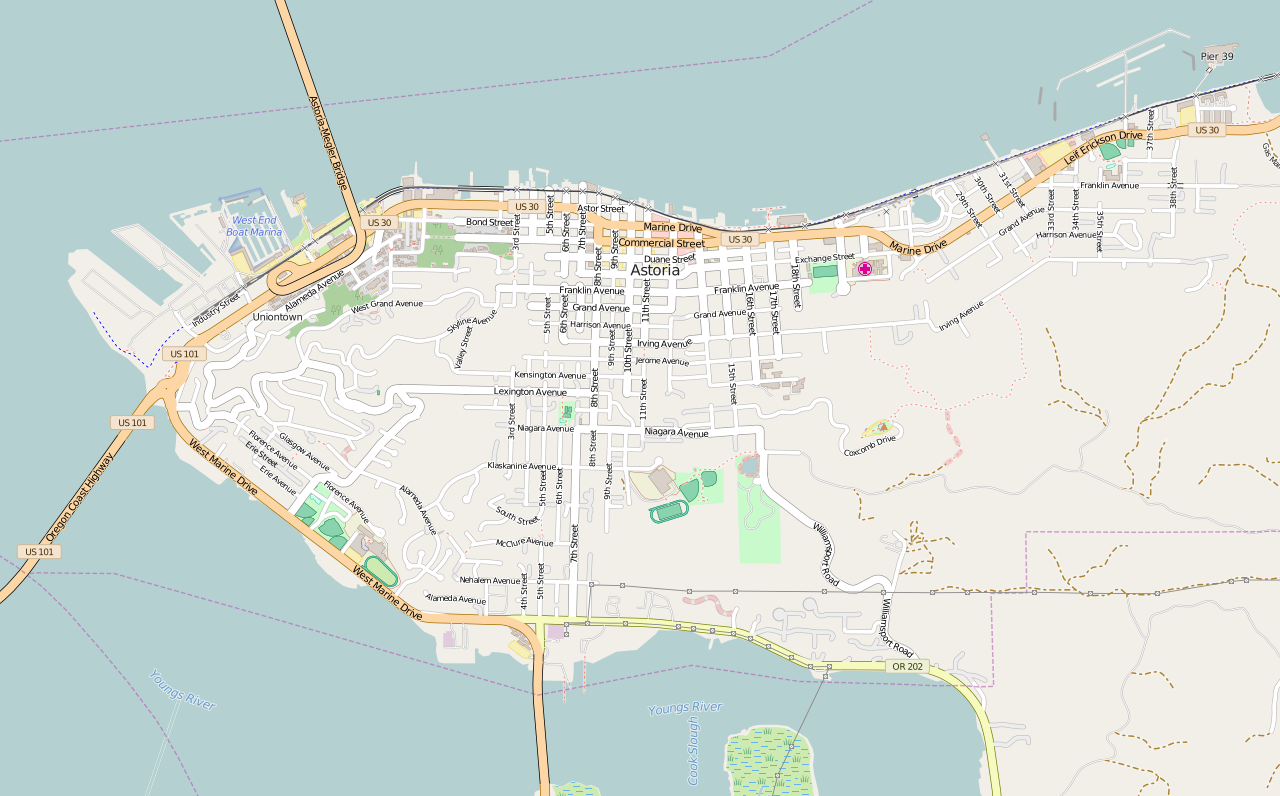
- Location within Astoria OR
- Location: 1388 Franklin Avenue; Astoria, Oregon
- Coordinates: 46°11′14″N 123°49′43″W
- Area: Less than 1 acre (0.40 ha)
- Built: 1867 (enlarged 1885, 1942)
- Built by: Charles Stevens
- Architectural style: Italianate
- Part of: Shively–McClure Historic District (ID05000829)
- NRHP reference No.: 85001178
- Added to NRHP: June 6, 1985

The Charles Stevens House is a historic residence in Astoria, Oregon, United States. The house was entered onto the National Register of Historic Places in 1985.

== History ==
The home is named after Charles Stevens who came to Astoria in 1852 and built this house in 1867. He was tailor by trade, but once settled, became a prominent writer and eventually city recorder and treasurer of the Clatsop chapter of the American Bible Association. In 1875, Charles and his son, Benjamin, opened a bookstore downtown called Charles Stevens & Sons City Bookstore. Charles and his wife, Ann Hopkinson, bore nine total children. Charles retired from his bookstore duties the year his wife Ann died in 1882. While Charles was quite an accomplished man, he was best known for his poetry and letter writing. He died in 1900.

Notably the home was owned by the German Methodist Episcopal South Church from 1894 to 1944. It served as a residence for the church's clergy and likely played a role as a center for pastoral care, meetings, and church functions.

After the death of Stevens, the house was occupied by from 1902 to 1917 by Dr Robert J. Pilkington (a general practitioner and surgeon) and then William E. Tallant (co-owner of the Tallant-Grant Packing Company). In 1917, resident became Samuel and Marie Burkholder Gallagher. Samuel was a restauranteur who owned the former Astoria landmark restaurant, the Imperial Grill which he opened in 1923.

Originally, this was a one and a half story wood framed house built in the Italianate style. There was a gable fronting on Franklin Avenue with only two centered windows. In 1880 a kitchen and breakfast nook were built as additions to the house. The home was eventually converted into a two story in 1885. In 1942 there was another addition enlarging several areas of the home.

The Charles Stevens house was one of few homes of this era which survived the widespread fires of 1883 and 1922.

== See also ==
- National Register of Historic Places listings in Clatsop County, Oregon
