= Norris Staples House =

Historic house in Oregon, United States

- U.S. National Register of Historic Places
- U.S. Historic district – Contributing property
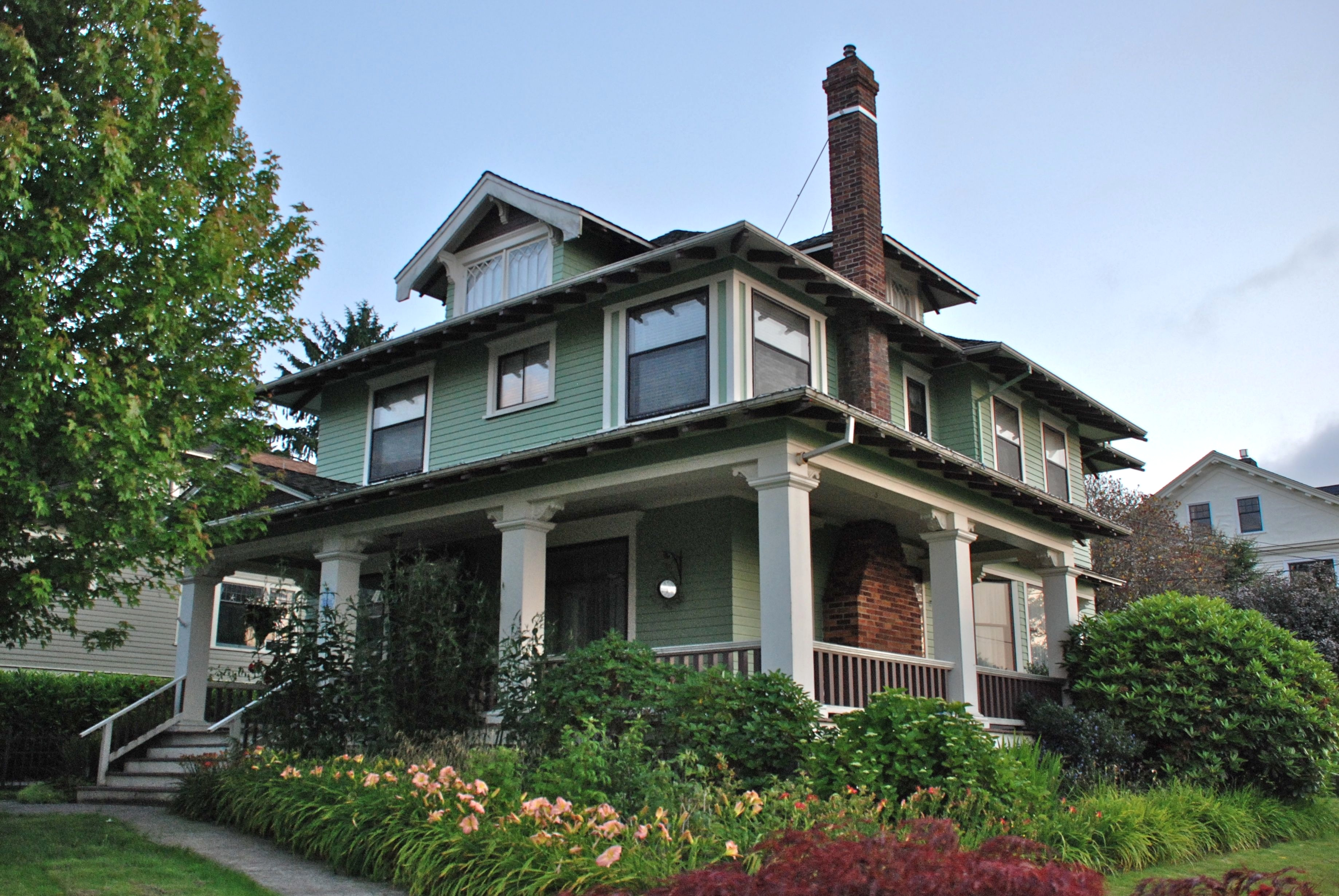
- The Staples House in 2012

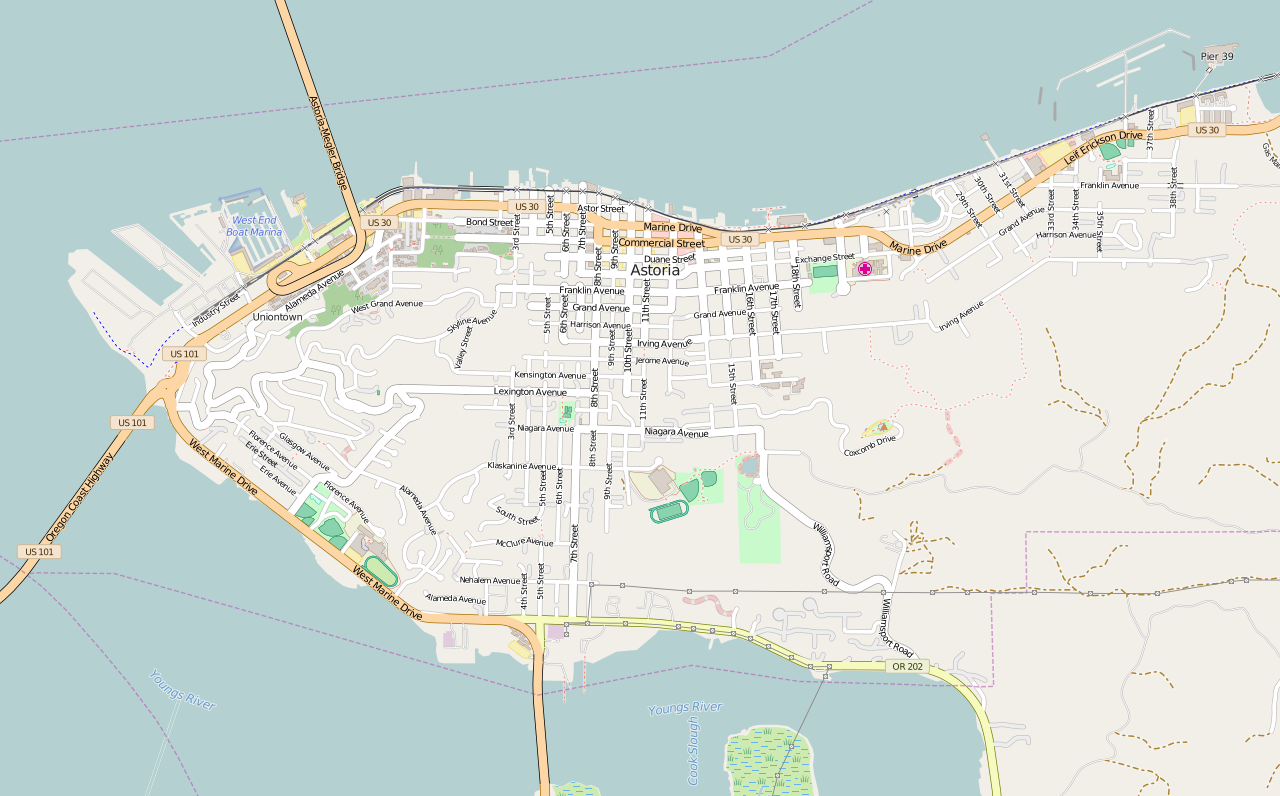
- Location within Astoria OR
- Location: 1031 14th Street; Astoria, Oregon
- Coordinates: 46°11′02″N 123°49′42″W
- Built: 1910
- Architectural style: Bungalow
- Part of: Shively–McClure Historic District (ID05000829)
- NRHP reference No.: 84000126
- Added to NRHP: October 25, 1984

The Norris Staples House is a house located in Astoria, Oregon, listed on the National Register of Historic Places.

== See also ==
- National Register of Historic Places listings in Clatsop County, Oregon
