= Ferdinand Fisher House =

Historic house in Oregon, United States

- U.S. National Register of Historic Places
- U.S. Historic district – Contributing property
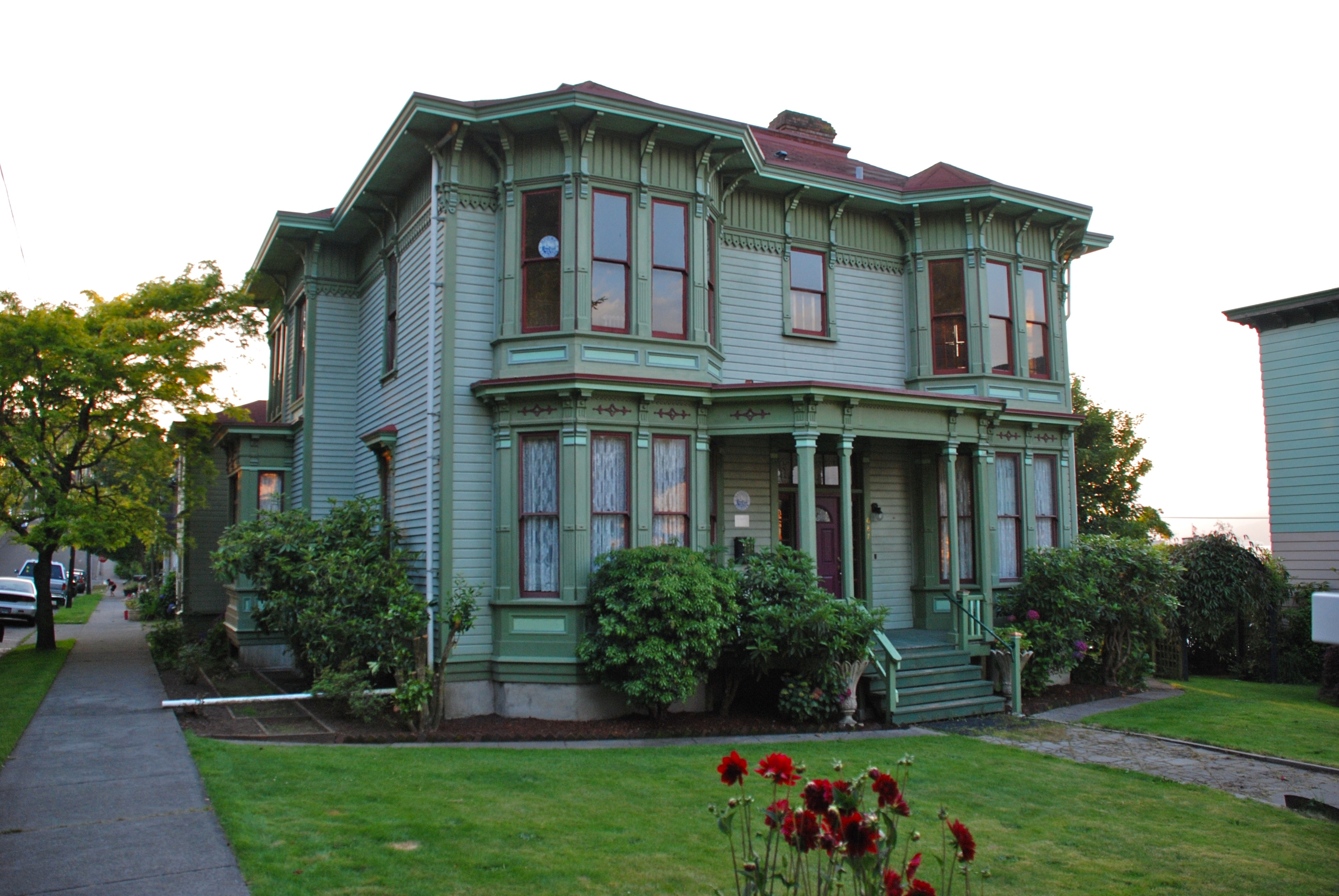
- The Fisher House in 2012

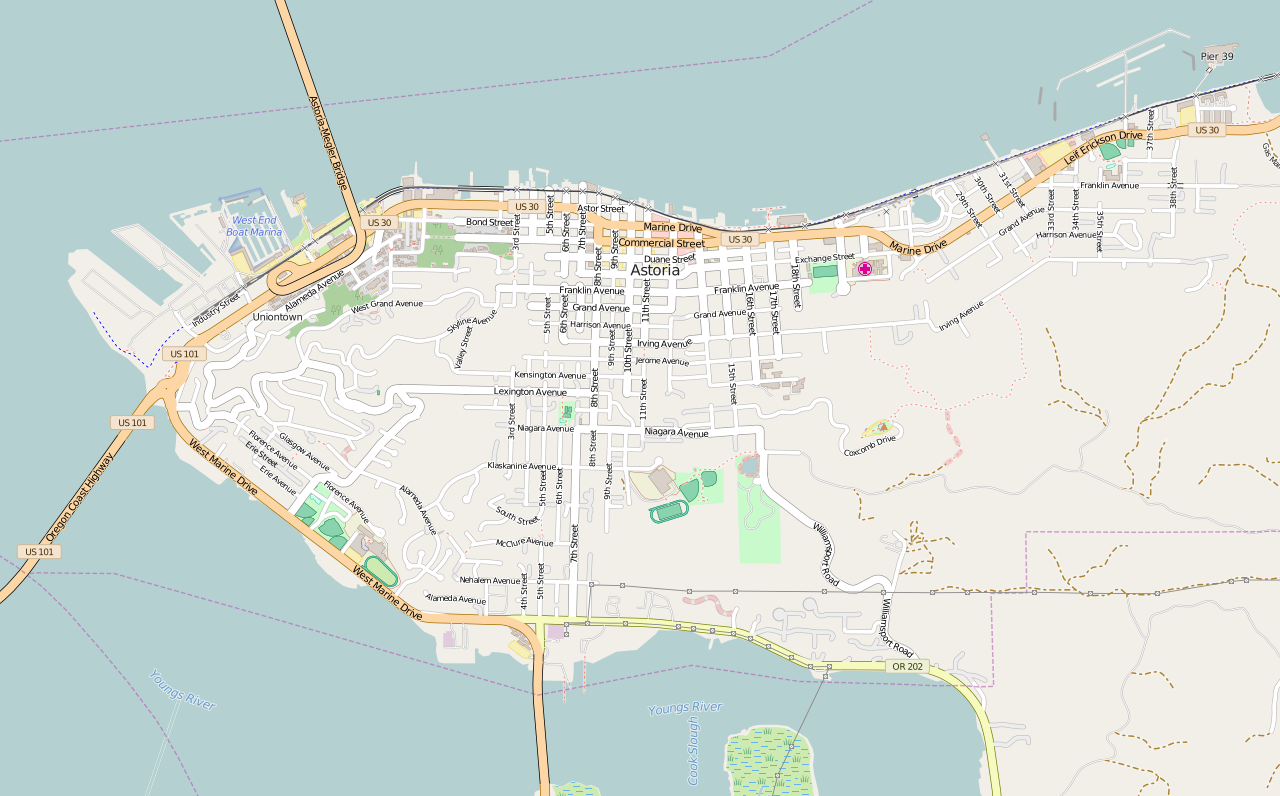
- Location within Astoria OR
- Location: 687 12th Street; Astoria, Oregon
- Coordinates: 46°11′11″N 123°49′50″W
- Built: ca. 1883
- Architectural style: Italianate
- Part of: Shively–McClure Historic District (ID05000829)
- NRHP reference No.: 87000668
- Added to NRHP: May 6, 1987

The Ferdinand Fisher House is a historic house in Astoria, Oregon, listed on the National Register of Historic Places. It was completed circa 1883.

== See also ==
- National Register of Historic Places listings in Clatsop County, Oregon
