= Albert W. Ferguson House =

Historic house in Oregon, United States

- U.S. National Register of Historic Places
- U.S. Historic district – Contributing property
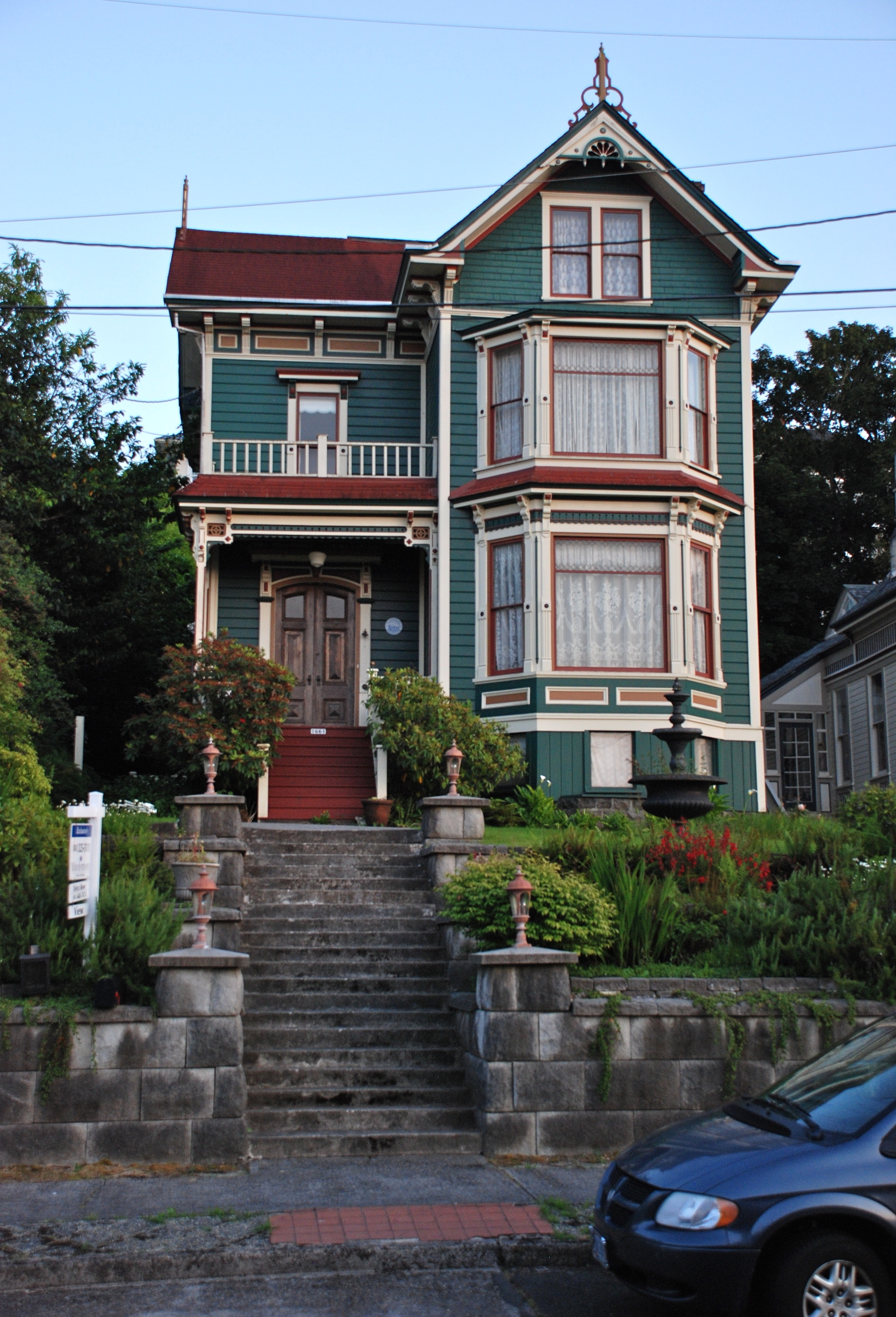
- The Albert W. Ferguson House in 2012.

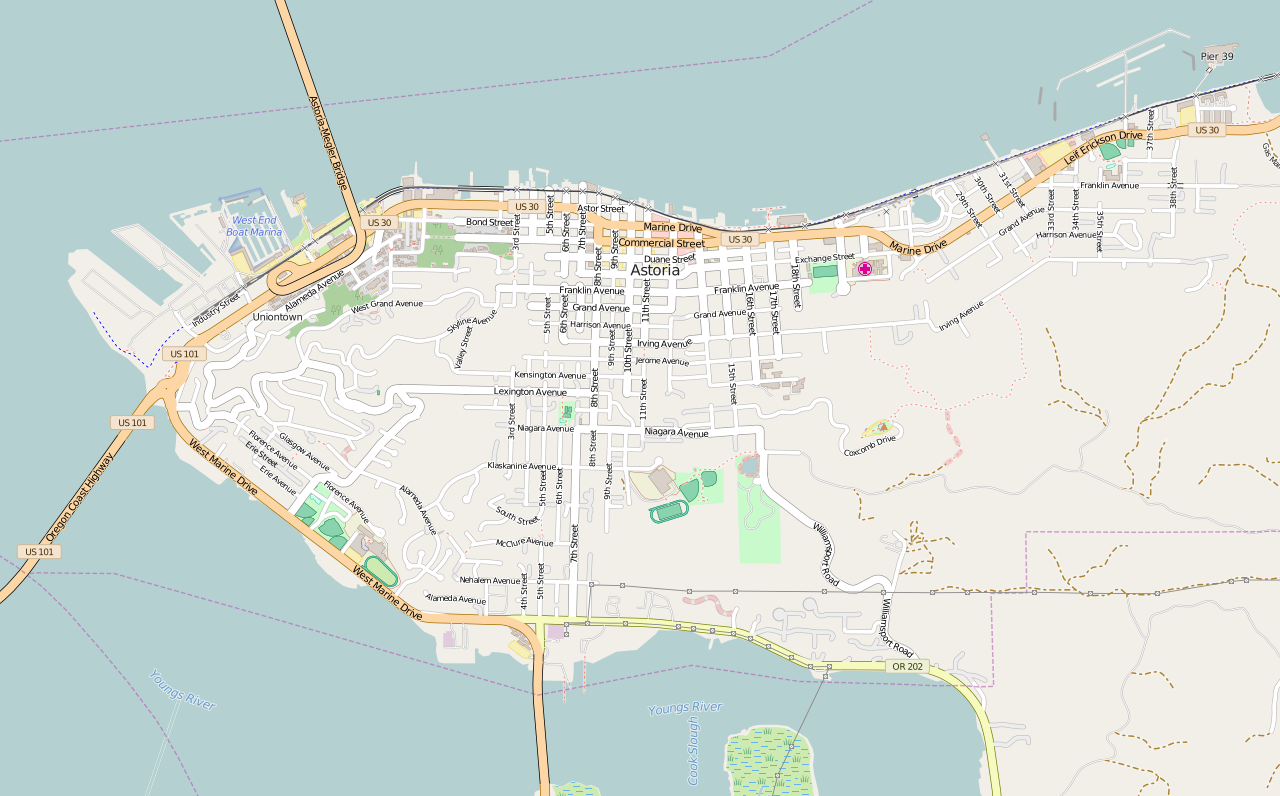
- Location within Astoria OR
- Location: 1661 Grand Avenue; Astoria, Oregon
- Coordinates: 46°11′09″N 123°49′29″W
- Area: less than one acre
- Built: 1886
- Architect: Albert W. and John Ernest Ferguson
- Architectural style: Eastlake-style
- Part of: Shively–McClure Historic District (ID05000829)
- NRHP reference No.: 84002955
- Added to NRHP: September 7, 1984

The Albert W. Ferguson House is a historic house located in Astoria, Oregon. It is listed on the National Register of Historic Places since 1984.

== History ==
Albert W. Ferguson (August 29, 1821–February 21, 1891) was a carpenter and architect in Oregon. He built many now-historic houses and other buildings in Oregon, particularly in Salem and Astoria. He moved to Astoria in 1876. While living in Astoria, he designed and built several homes and other buildings, including the first city hall, built in 1878, and the NRHP-listed Capt. J. H. D. Gray House. His youngest son, James Ernest Ferguson, built his father's house, but Albert W. collaborated with his son on the house's design.

James Ernest Ferguson later partnered with Charles Houston to found Ferguson & Houston, an Astoria architectural and construction firm. The company designed and built many area homes and other buildings, including the Old Astoria City Hall, which was designed by Emil Schacht.

Albert W. Ferguson, who was already ill at the time of the house's construction, resided in the house from its completion in 1886 until his death in 1891 from inflammatory rheumatism. Another son, Edward Z. Ferguson, was living in the house at that time and continued to do so until 1910. Albert's daughter, Ada, moved into the house with her husband, John N. Griffin, in 1910 and resided there until her death in 1937.

The house was added to the National Register of Historic Places in 1984.

== See also ==
- National Register of Historic Places listings in Clatsop County, Oregon
