= Robert Rensselaer Bartlett House =

Historic house in Oregon, United States

- U.S. National Register of Historic Places
- U.S. Historic district – Contributing property
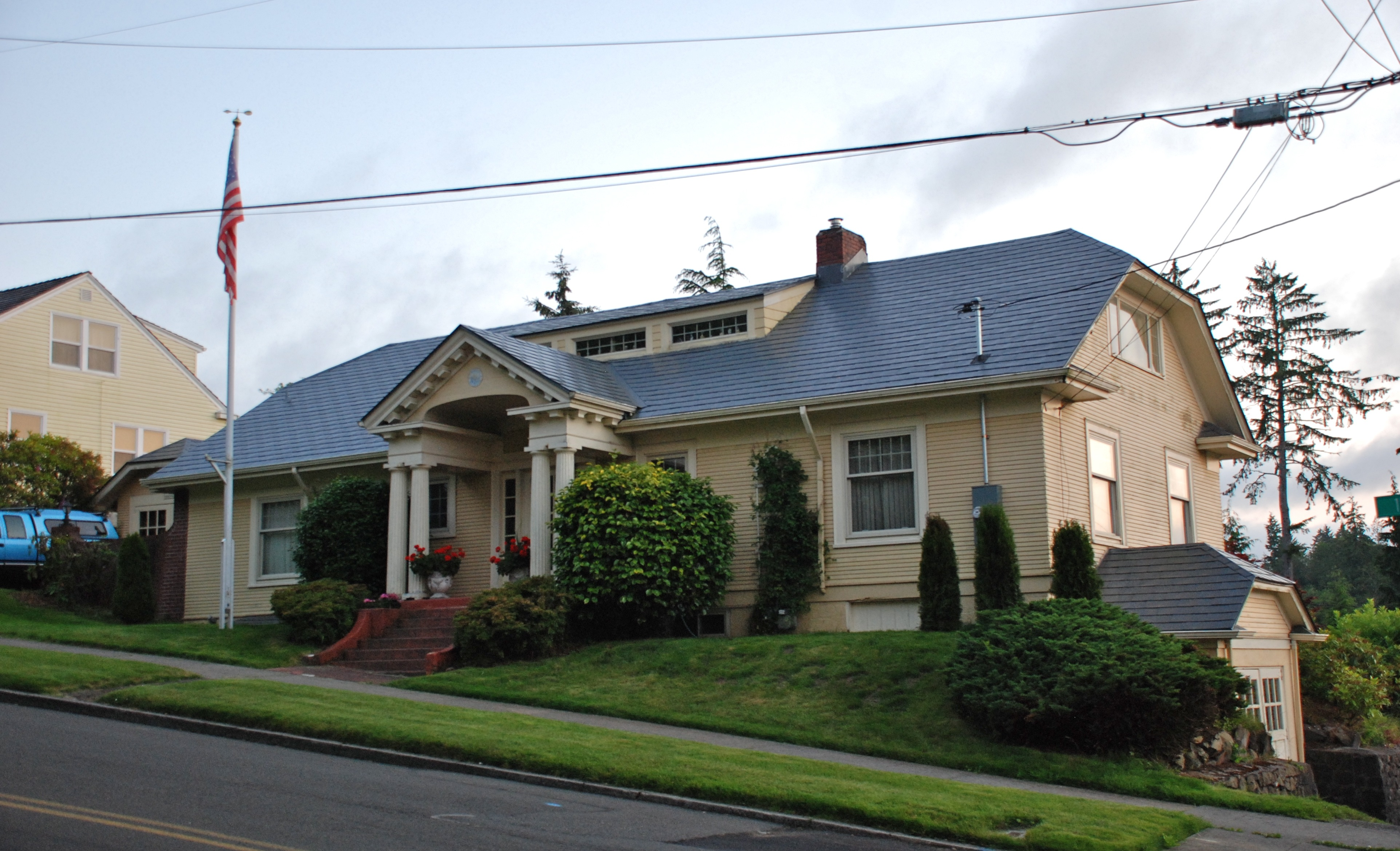
- The Bartlett House in 2012

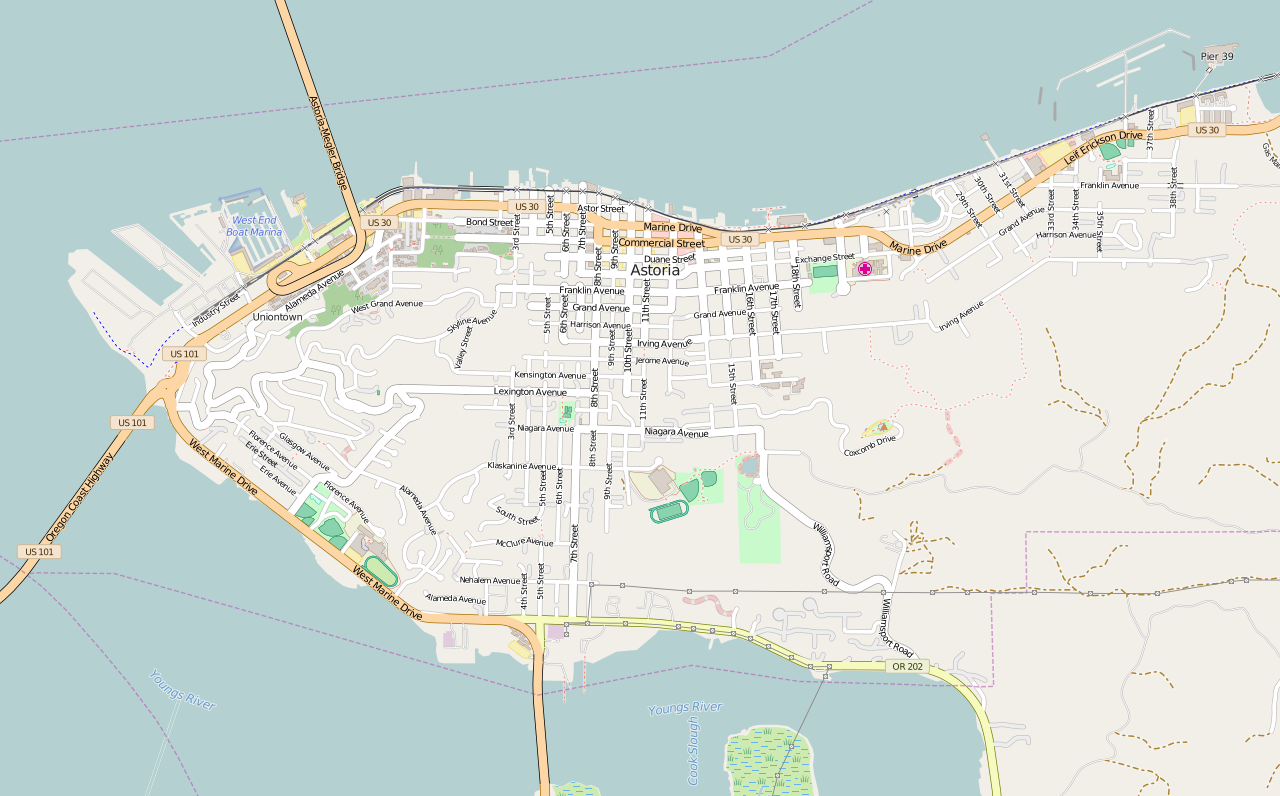
- Location within Astoria OR
- Location: 1215 15th Street; Astoria, Oregon
- Coordinates: 46°10′59″N 123°49′36″W
- Area: Less than 1 acre (0.40 ha)
- Built: 1921
- Architect: Robert Rensselaer Bartlett
- Architectural style: Bungalow, with Colonial Revival details
- Part of: Shively–McClure Historic District (ID05000829)
- NRHP reference No.: 86001236
- Added to NRHP: June 5, 1986

The Robert Rensselaer Bartlett House is a historic residence located in Astoria, Oregon, United States.

The house was listed on the National Register of Historic Places in 1986.

== See also ==
- National Register of Historic Places listings in Clatsop County, Oregon
