= Old Grace Episcopal Church Rectory =

Historic house in Oregon, United States

- Grace Episcopal Church Rectory, Old
- U.S. National Register of Historic Places
- U.S. Historic district – Contributing property
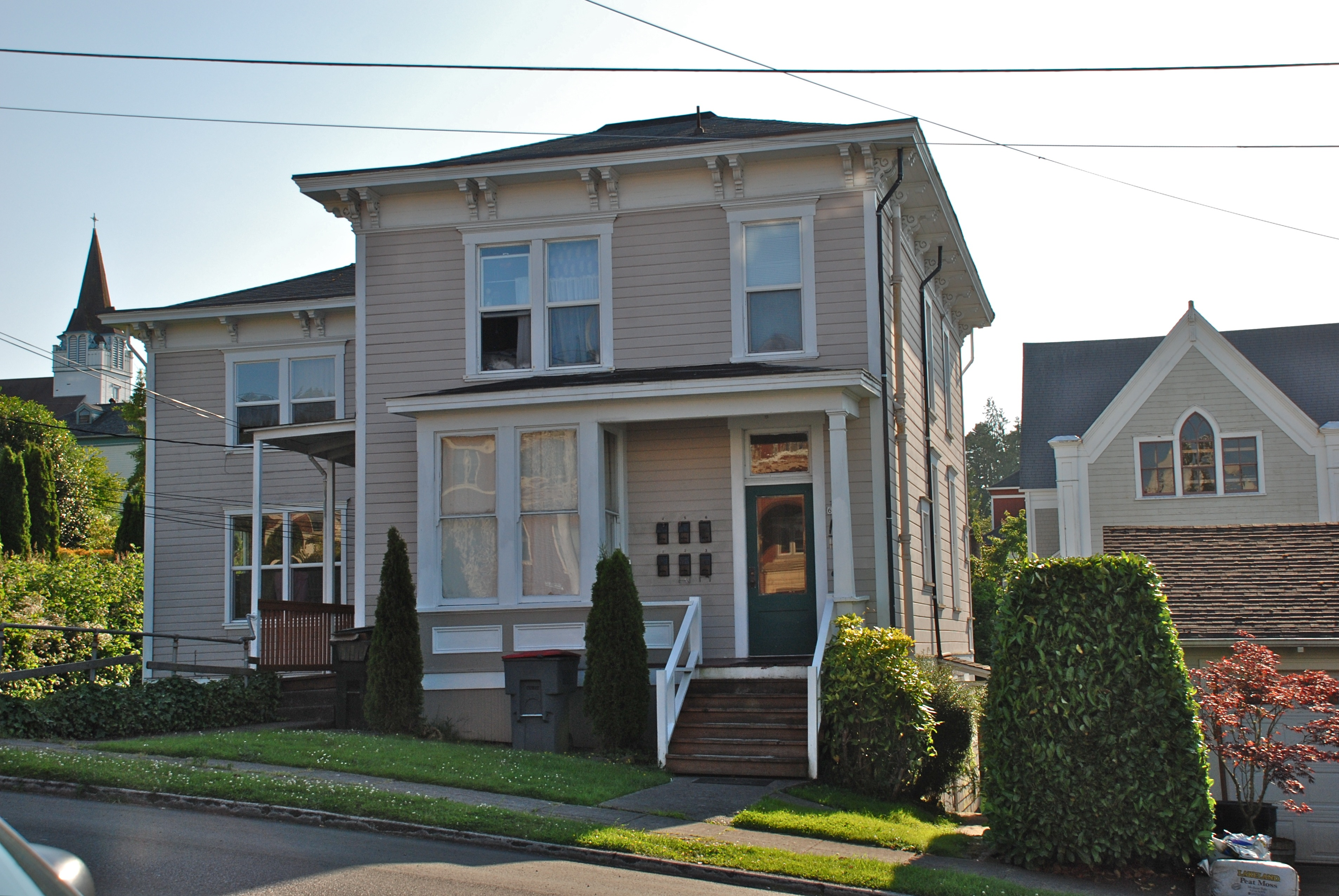
- The rectory in 2012

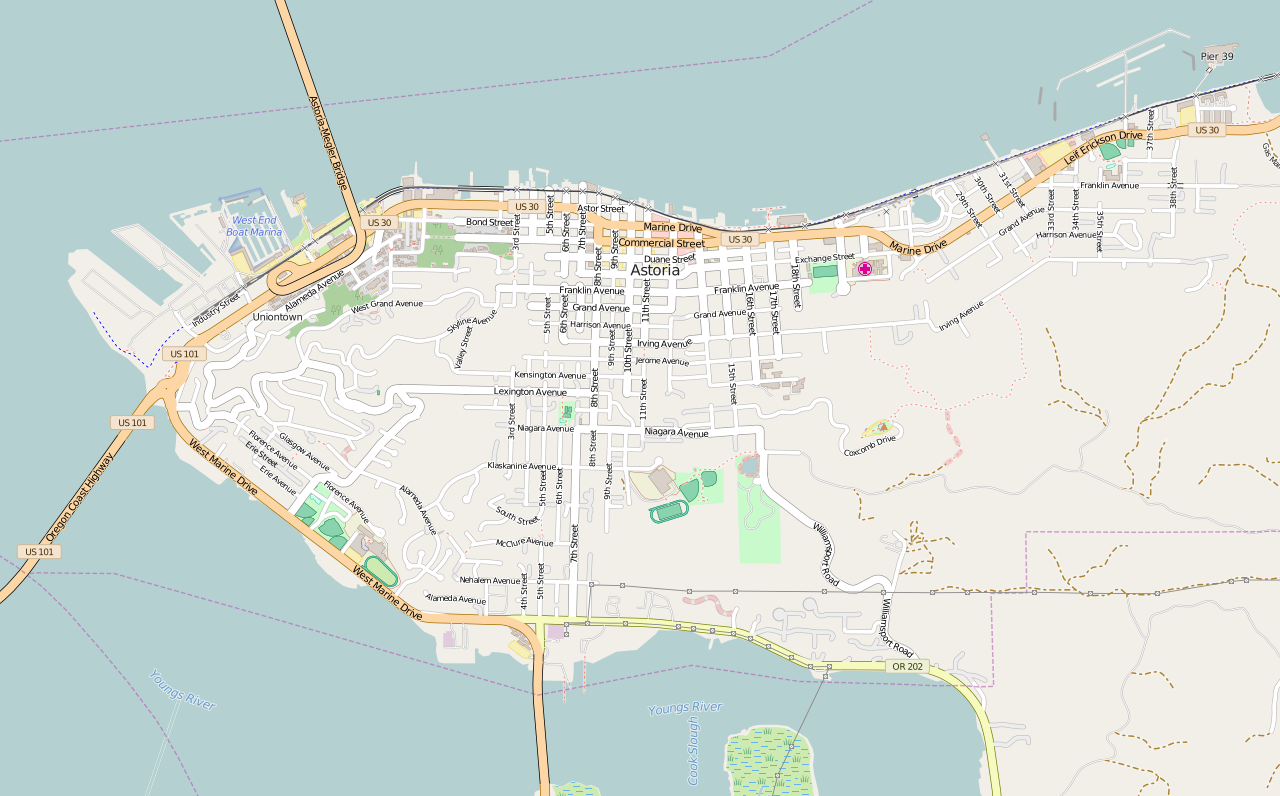
- Location within Astoria OR
- Location: 637 16th Street; Astoria, Oregon
- Coordinates: 46°11′12″N 123°49′33″W
- Area: 5,000 sq ft (460 m^{2})
- Built: 1887 (original); 1901 (addition)
- Built by: J. E. Ferguson (attributed)
- Architectural style: Italianate
- Part of: Shively–McClure Historic District (ID05000829)
- NRHP reference No.: 90000375
- Added to NRHP: March 9, 1990

The Old Grace Episcopal Church Rectory is a historic clergy house in Astoria, Oregon, United States.

The rectory was entered onto the National Register of Historic Places in 1990.

== See also ==
- National Register of Historic Places listings in Clatsop County, Oregon
- Grace Episcopal Church (Astoria, Oregon)
