= Grace Episcopal Church (Astoria, Oregon) =

Historic church in Oregon, United States

- Grace Episcopal Church and Rectory
- U.S. National Register of Historic Places
- U.S. Historic district – Contributing property
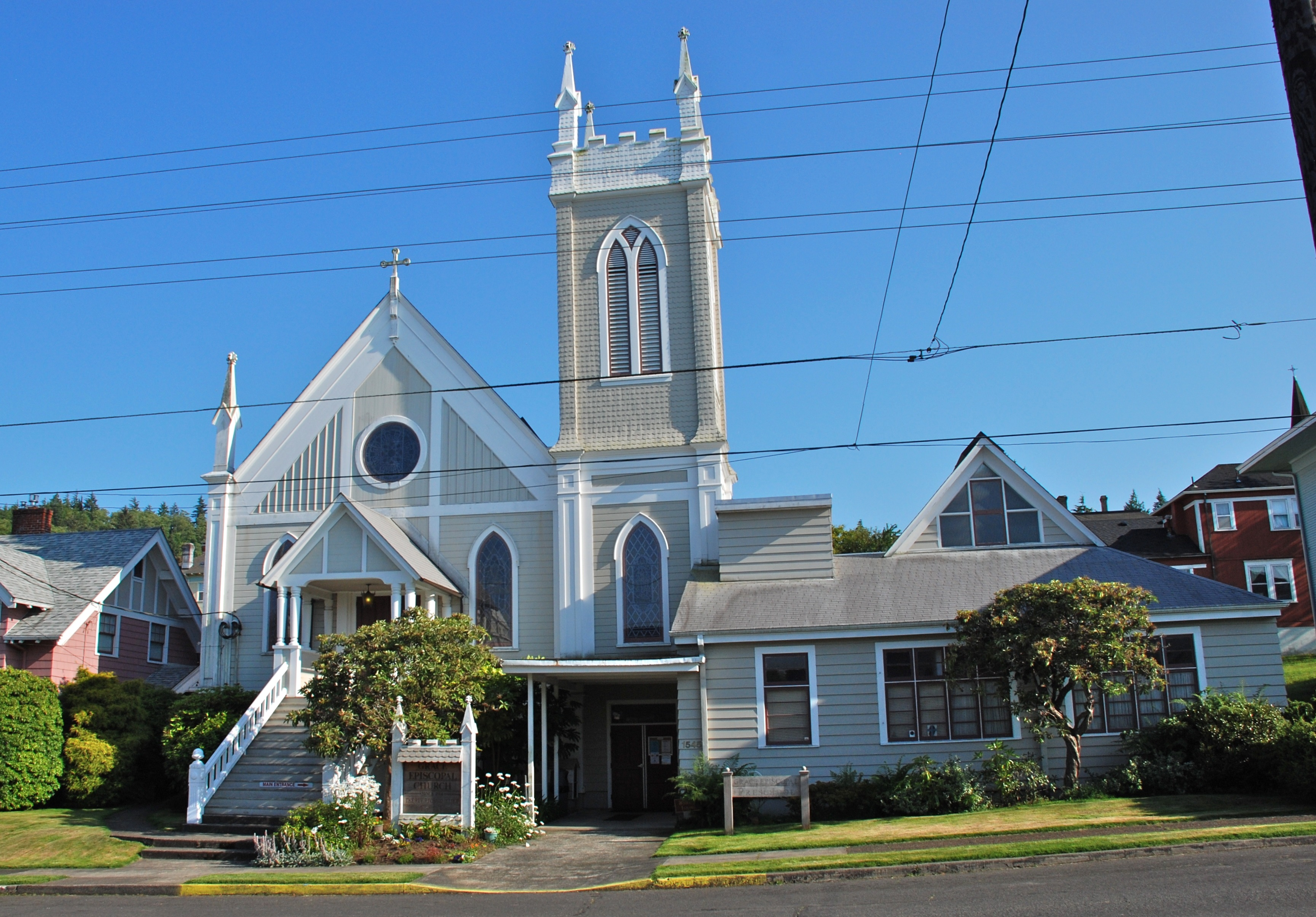
- Grace Episcopal Church in 2012. The rectory is the house visible at the left edge of the photo.

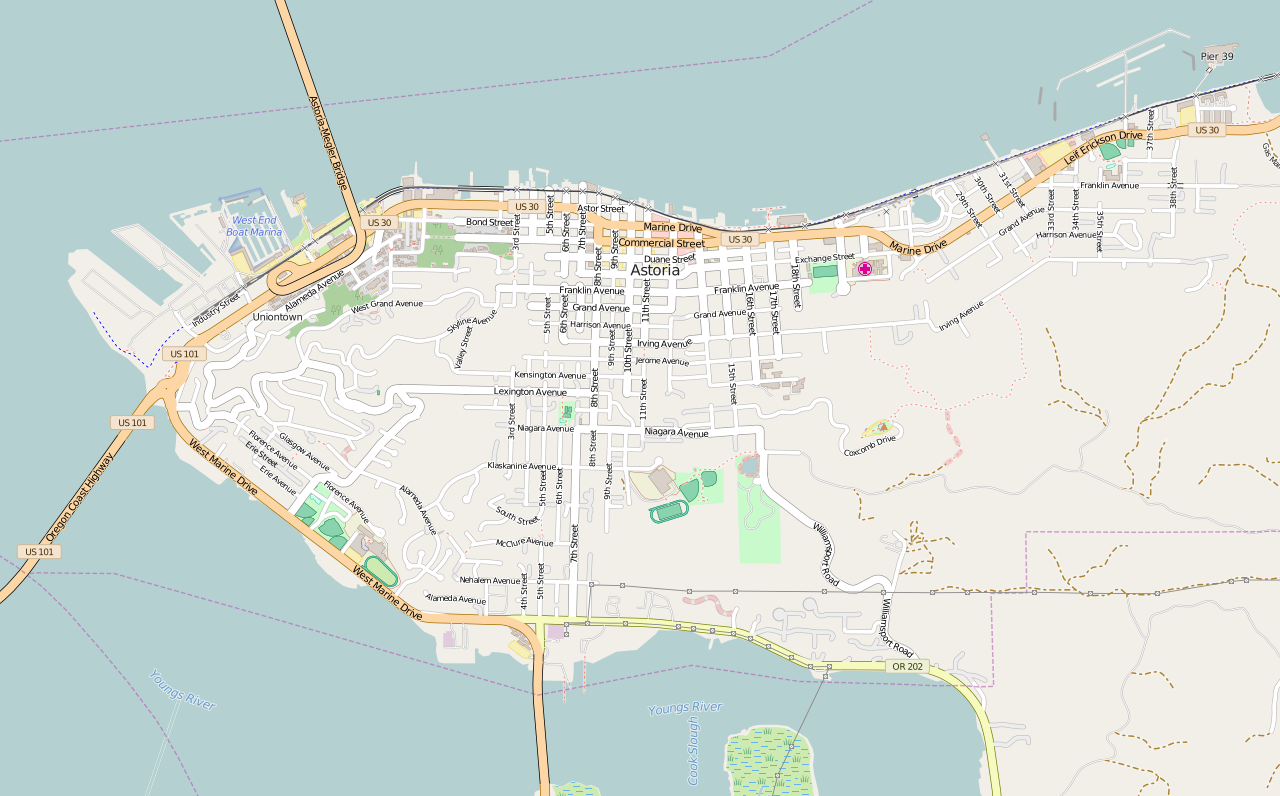
- Location within Astoria OR
- Location: 1545 Franklin Avenue; Astoria, Oregon
- Coordinates: 46°11′13″N 123°49′35″W
- Area: Less than 1 acre (0.40 ha)
- Built: 1885–1886 (church); 1916 (rectory)
- Built by: James Ernest Ferguson and Louis Hartwig (church)
- Architect: C. W. Leich (church); A. D. Gendron (rectory)
- Architectural style: Gothic Revival (church); Arts and Crafts (rectory)
- Part of: Shively–McClure Historic District (ID05000829)
- NRHP reference No.: 84002957
- Added to NRHP: September 7, 1984

Grace Episcopal Church, also referred to as Grace Episcopal Church and Rectory in the context of historic preservation, is a church, historic church building, and accompanying parsonage, all located in Astoria, Oregon, United States.

The church and rectory were listed on the National Register of Historic Places in 1984.

== See also ==
- National Register of Historic Places listings in Clatsop County, Oregon
- Old Grace Episcopal Church Rectory
