= Shively–McClure Historic District =

Historic district in Astoria, Oregon, USA

- U.S. National Register of Historic Places
- U.S. Historic district
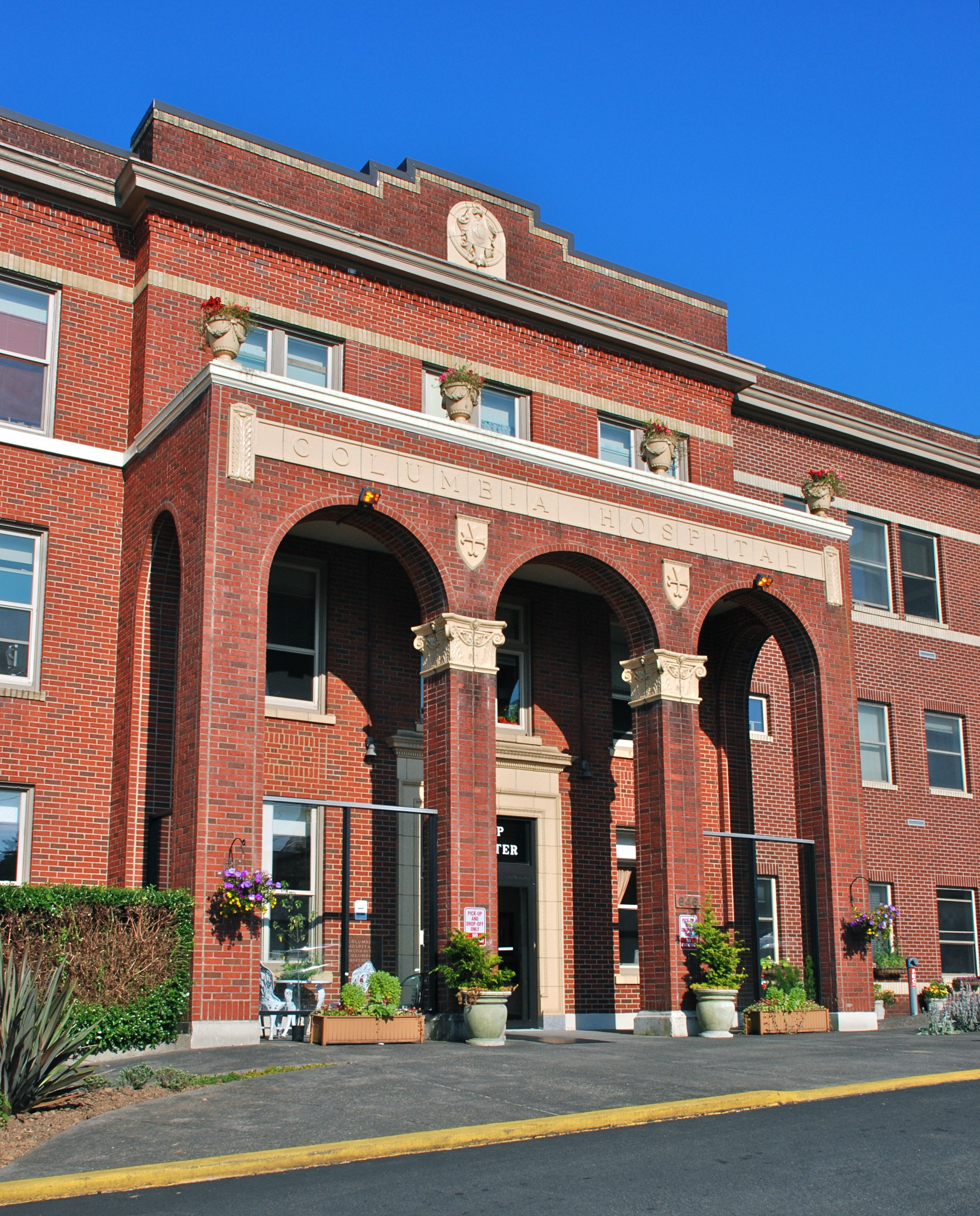
- Columbia Hospital (now Clatsop Care Center)

- Location within Oregon
- Location: From Franklin to Lexington Aves., and from 9th to 18th Sts., Astoria, Oregon, U.S.
- Area: 89 acres (36 ha)
- Built: 1856
- Architect: Albert Ferguson and James Ferguson; et.al.
- Architectural style: Gothic Revival, Late Victorian
- NRHP reference No.: 05000829
- Added to NRHP: August 4, 2005

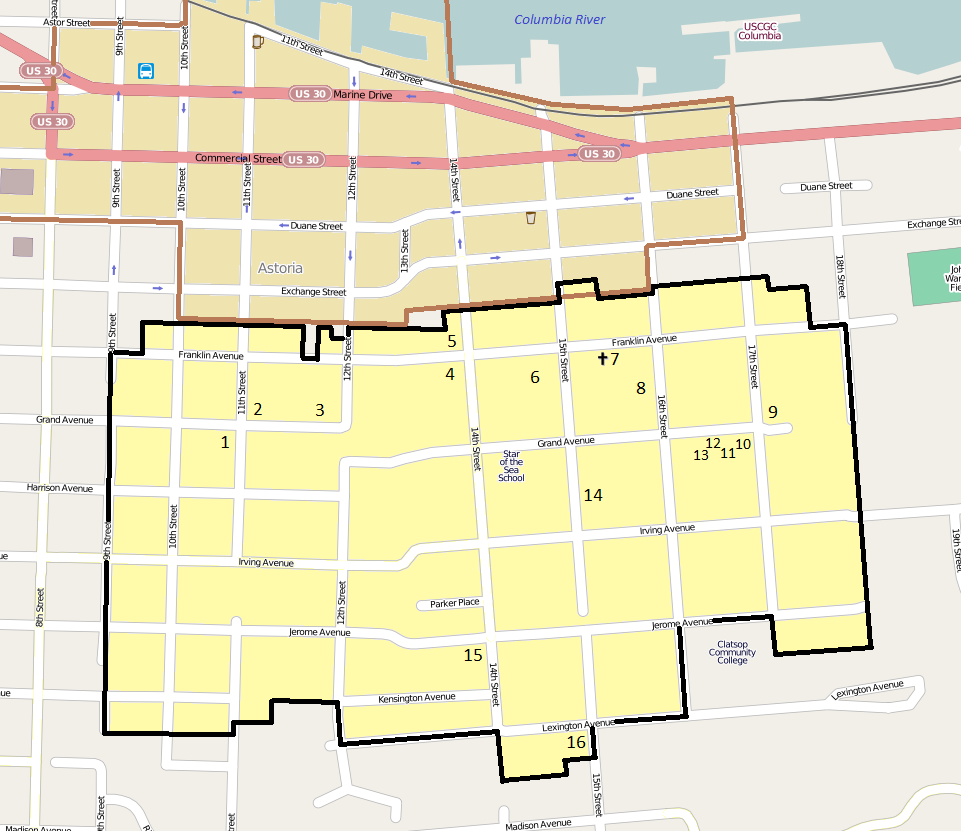
Shively–McClure boundary map (in yellow)

The Shively–McClure Historic District, or Church Hill, is a historic district in Astoria, Oregon, United States. It contains some of the earliest houses in the city, and borders the Astoria Downtown Historic District. It was listed in the National Register of Historic Places in 2005, and it contains a historical marker.

== History ==
Shively–McClure was Astoria's first neighborhood, and was recorded on a map in 1846 by Colonel John McClure and John Shively.

The historic district is bound from Franklin Avenue to Lexington Avenue., and from 9th Street to 18th Street, in Astoria. It contains some 408 buildings, and of which 343 buildings were built before 1939, and the majority are houses. The neighborhood contains diversity of architectural styles from the late 19th century, and early 20th century, with nearly three-quarters of the buildings are represented with three styles: Victorian, Colonial Revival and Craftsman. The Shively–McClure Historic District has 237 contributing buildings, 1 contributing site, and 3 contributing structures. Finnish architect John Erik Wicks (1878–1963) designed some 40 houses in the area.

The neighborhood has one designated historic site, which is marked by a granite obelisk on 15th Street. It was the site of the first U.S. Post Office west of the Rocky Mountains; it was commissioned in 1847, in a small house built by John Shively. The former post office building was destroyed in 1906.

The churches in the neighborhood include: the Grace Episcopal Church (1885; and rectory), Swedish Lutheran Apostolic Church (c. 1885), St. Mary's Catholic Church (1901), First Presbyterian Church (1903), First Methodist Church (1916), First Church of Christ Scientist (1923), Astoria Church of Christ (1923), First Church of Christ Scientist (1951), and the Bible Baptist Church (c. 1958). The Trinity Lutheran Church was designed by John Erik Wicks, and is now a performing arts center for Clatsop Community College.

== List of notable buildings ==
- Hiram Brown House (1852)
- Charles Heilborn Residence (1876), 1546 Franklin Avenue
- Hagestrom Duplex (c. 1880), 915–917 Grand Avenue
- Peter L. Cherry House (1882), 836–15th Street; NRHP-listed
- Albert W. Ferguson House (1886), 1661 Grand Avenue; NRHP-listed
- Ferdinand and Augustus Fisher Residence (1890), 687–12th Street; NRHP-listed
- Martin Foard House (1891), 690–17th Street; NRHP-listed
- J. Me Cue Residence (1890), 934 Irving Avenue
- John N. Griffin House (1892), 1643 Grand Avenue; NRHP-listed
- George H. George Residence (1900), 1720 Irving Avenue
- Charles Fulton House (1900), 922–17th Street
- Captain George Conrad Flavel House (1901), 627–15th Street; NRHP-listed
- Frank Carney Duplex (c. 1910), 1312–1316 Kensington Avenue
- Charles Stevens House (1910), 1289 Franklin Avenue; NRHP-listed
- Norris Staples House (1910), 1031–14th Street; NRHP-listed
- Frank Stipcich House (1913), 1288 Kensington Avenue
- Allen Fulton House (1916), 1120 Irving Avenue
- O. I. Petersen Residence (1917), Grand Avenue
- Charles Wirkkala House (1921), 938 Kensington
- Robert Rensselaer Bartlett House (1921), 1215–15th Street; NRHP-listed
- Columbia Hospital (now Clatsop Care Center), 646–16th Street
Houses in the Shively–McClure Historic District

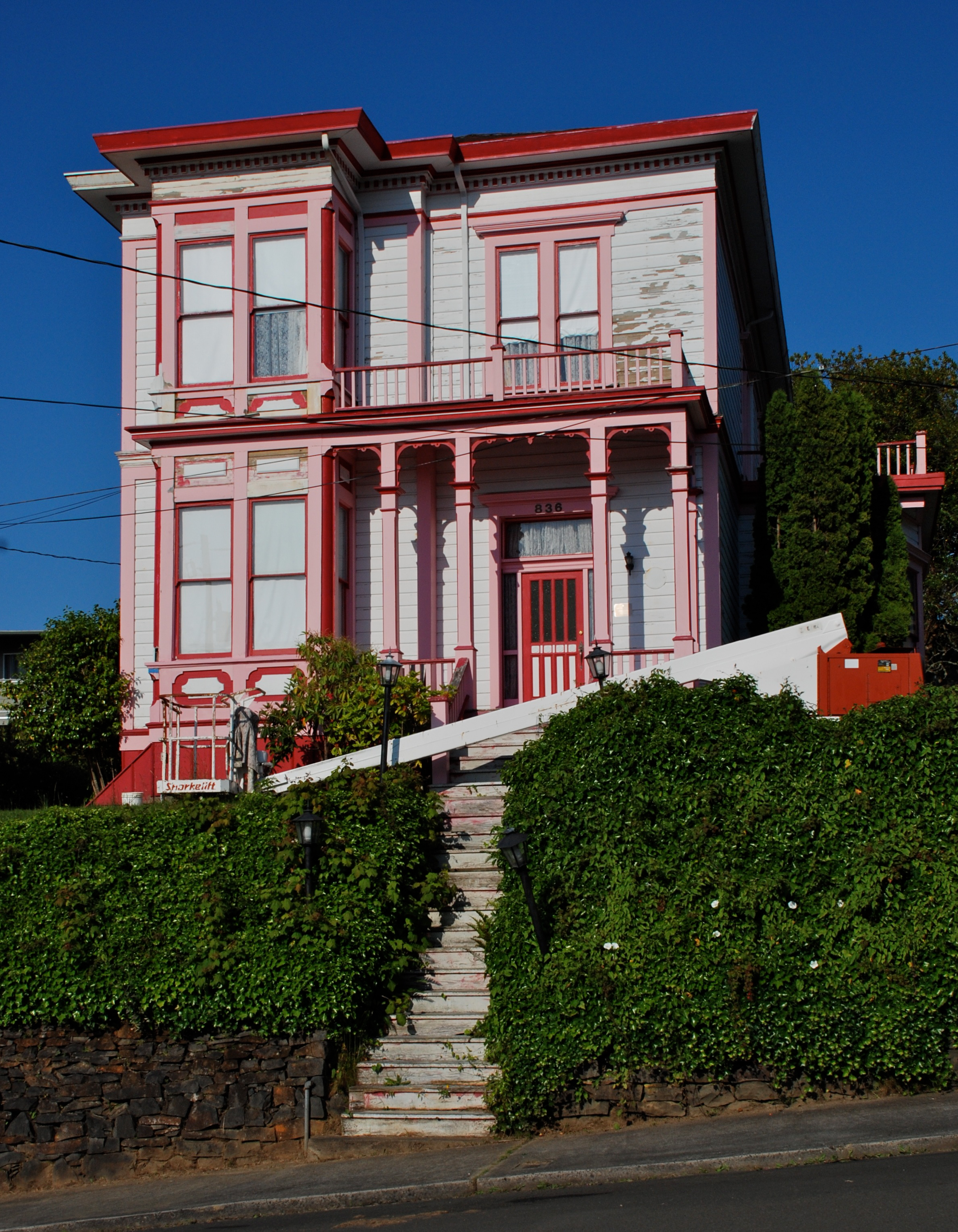
Peter L. Cherry House (1882)

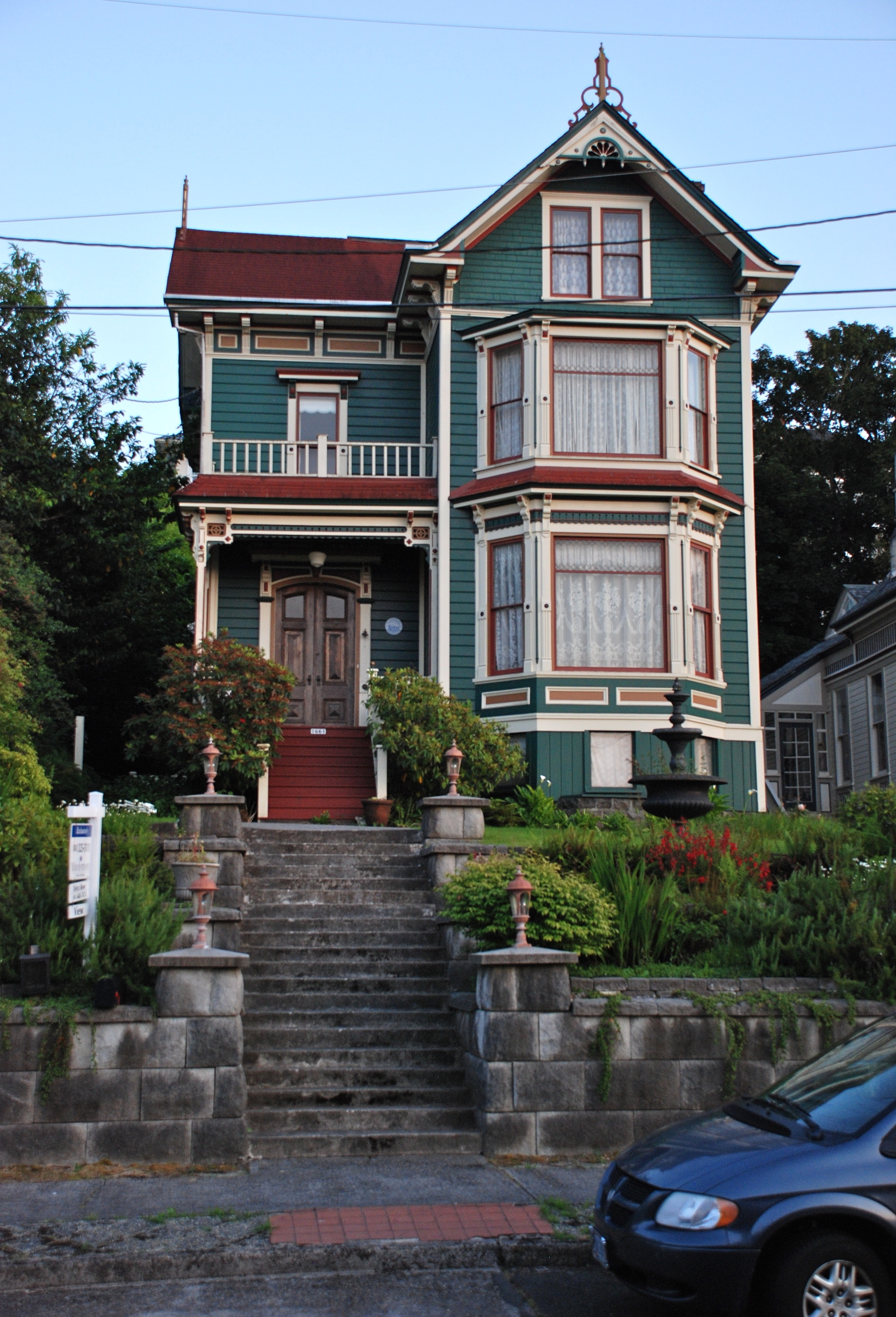
Albert W. Ferguson House (1886)

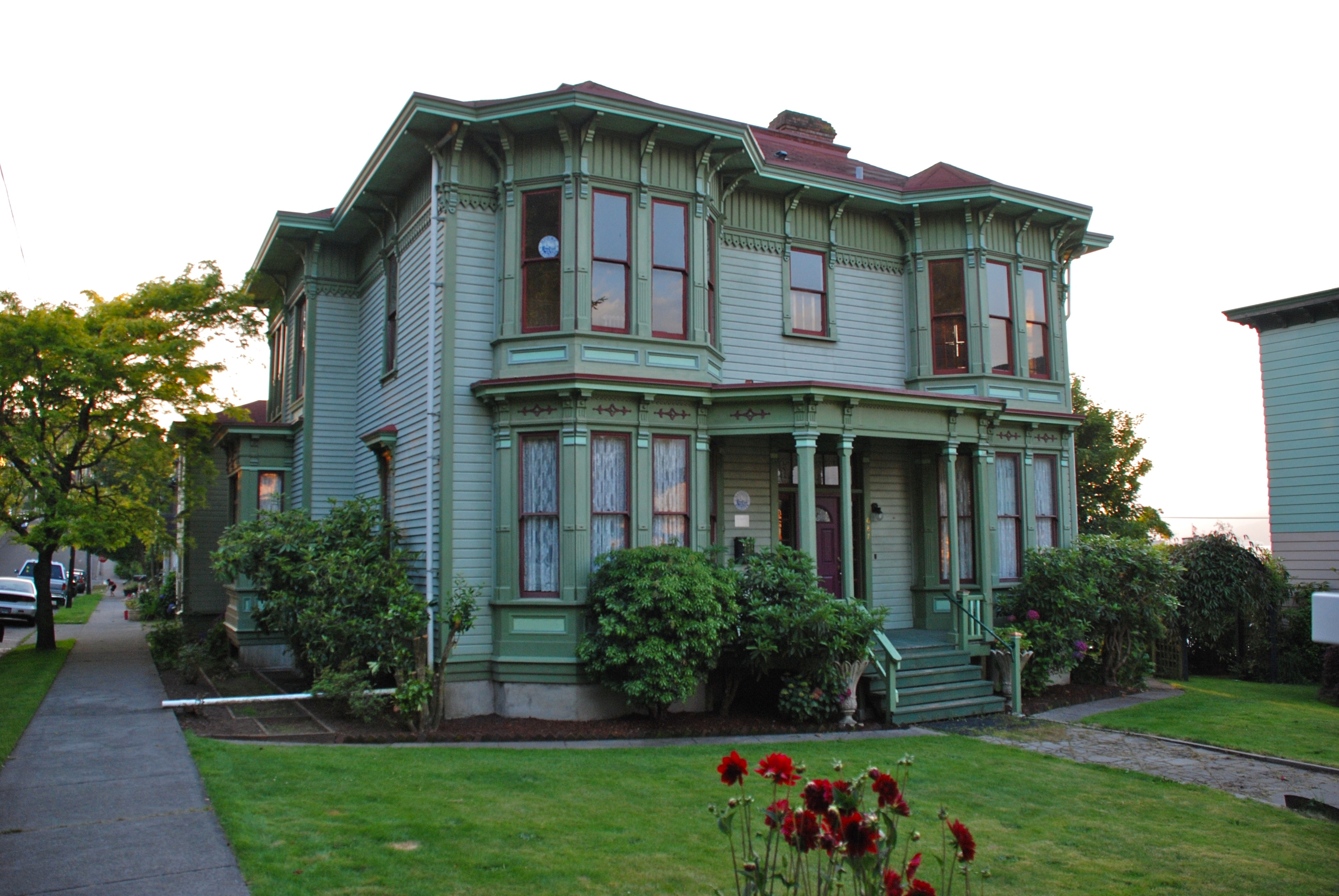
Ferdinand Fisher House (1892)

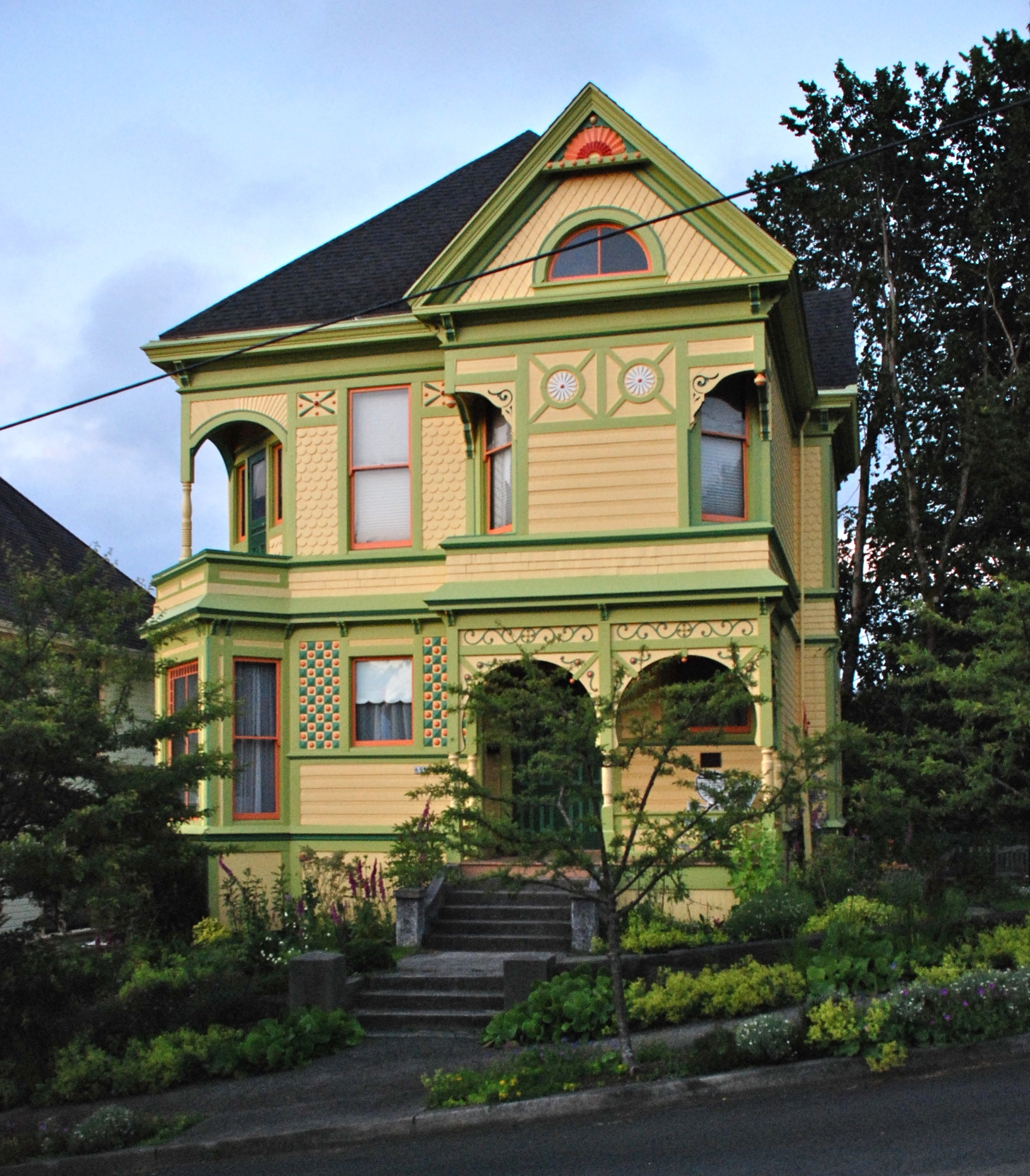
Martin Foard House (1891)

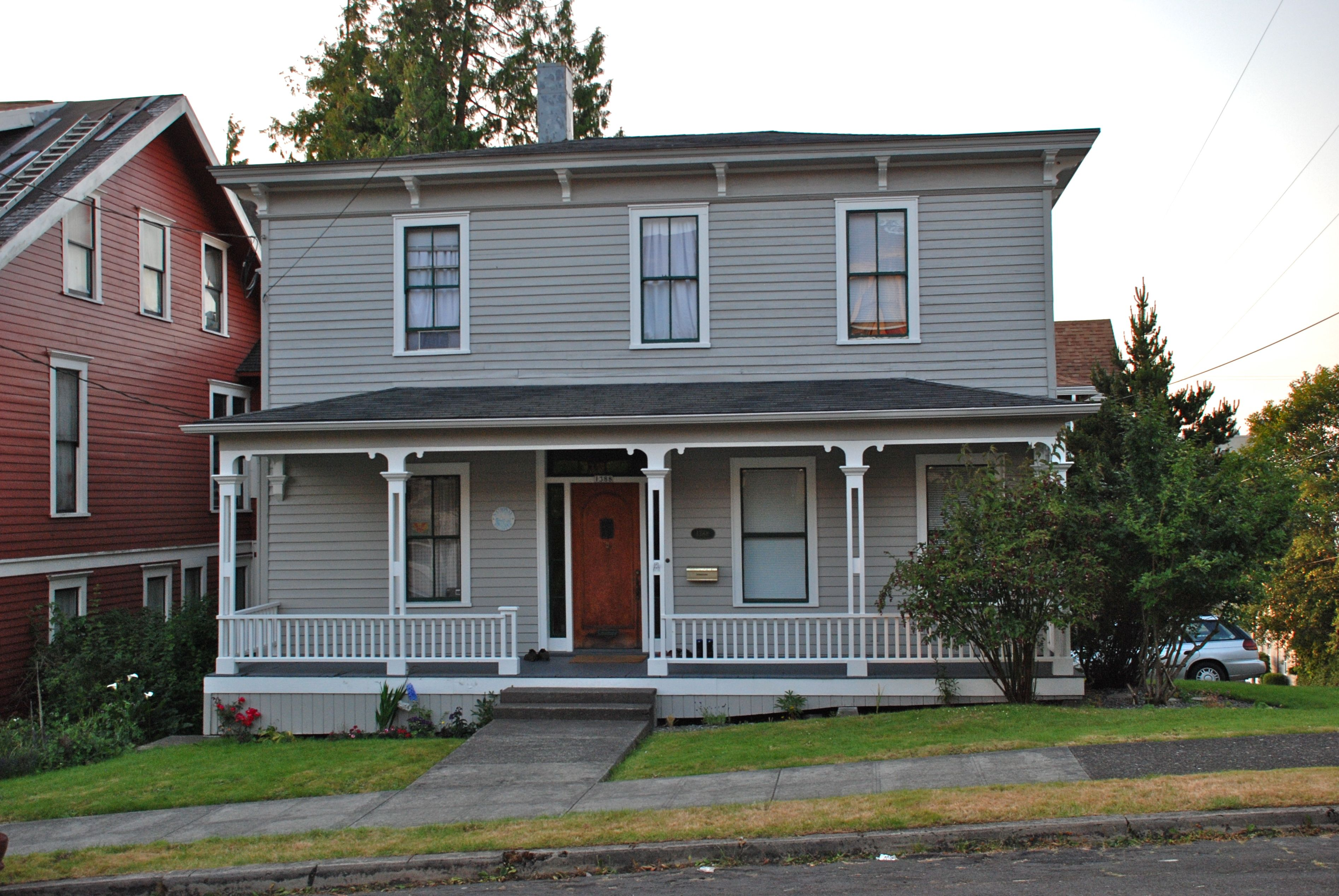
Charles Stevens House (1910)

== See also ==
- National Register of Historic Places listings in Clatsop County, Oregon
