= Martin Foard House =

Historic house in Oregon, United States

- U.S. National Register of Historic Places
- U.S. Historic district – Contributing property
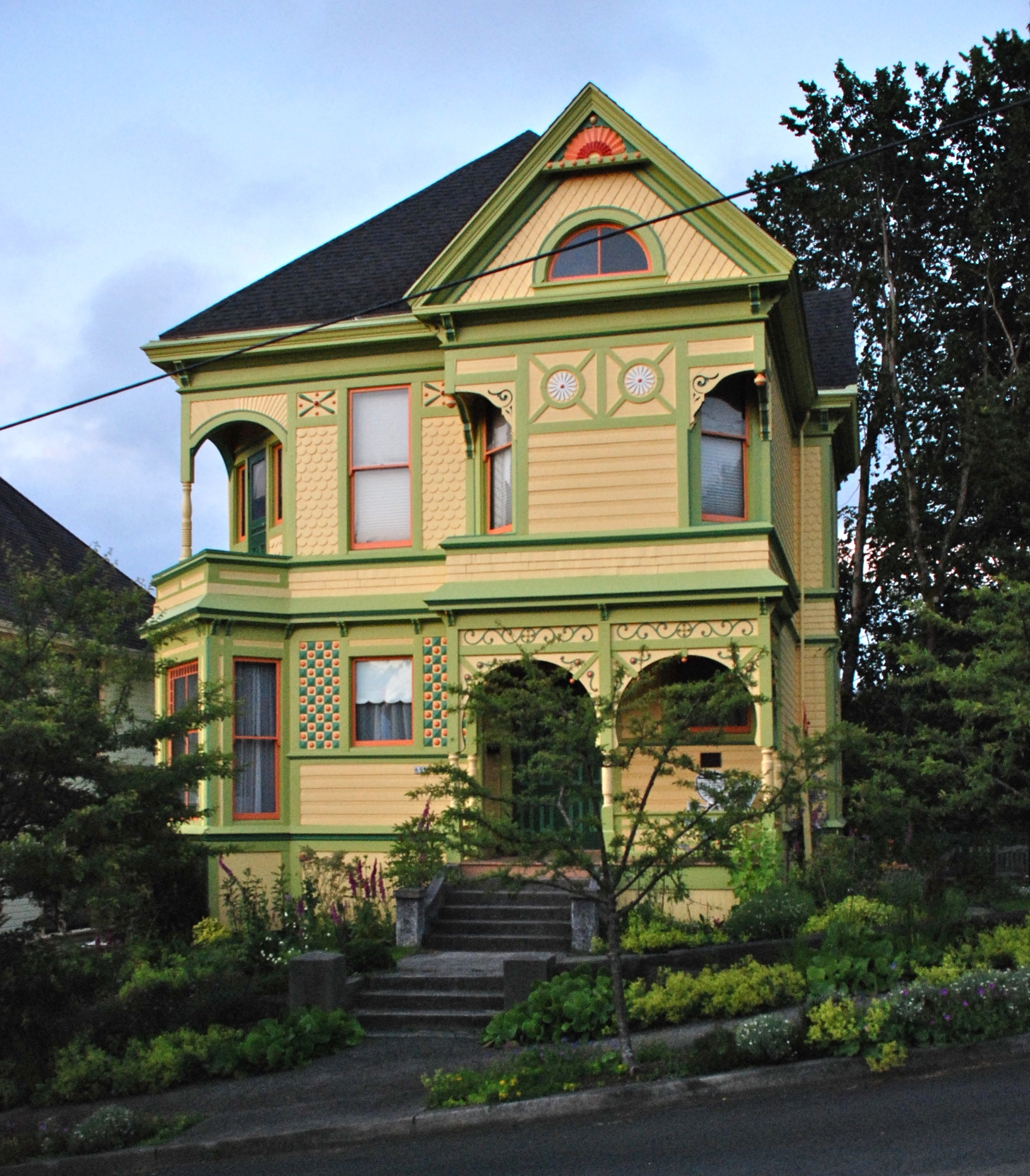
- The house's front exterior in 2012

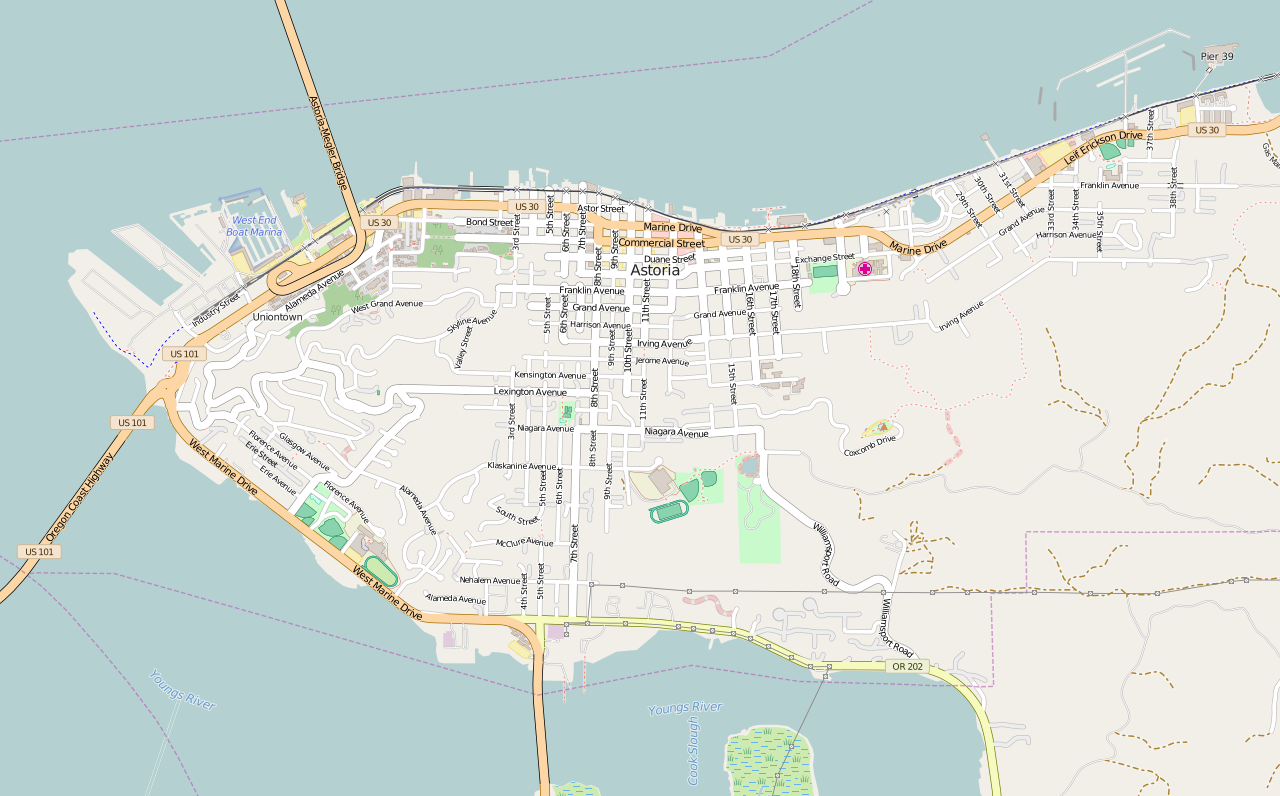
- Location within Astoria OR
- Location: 690 17th Street; Astoria, Oregon
- Coordinates: 46°11′11″N 123°49′26″W
- Built: 1891
- Architectural style: Queen Anne
- Part of: Shively–McClure Historic District (ID05000829)
- NRHP reference No.: 86001221
- Added to NRHP: June 5, 1986

The Martin Foard House is a house located in Astoria, Oregon, listed on the National Register of Historic Places.

== See also ==
- National Register of Historic Places listings in Clatsop County, Oregon
