= Hermiston–Pendleton micropolitan area =

United States census area

Hermiston–Pendleton micropolitan statistical area
- Micropolitan statistical area
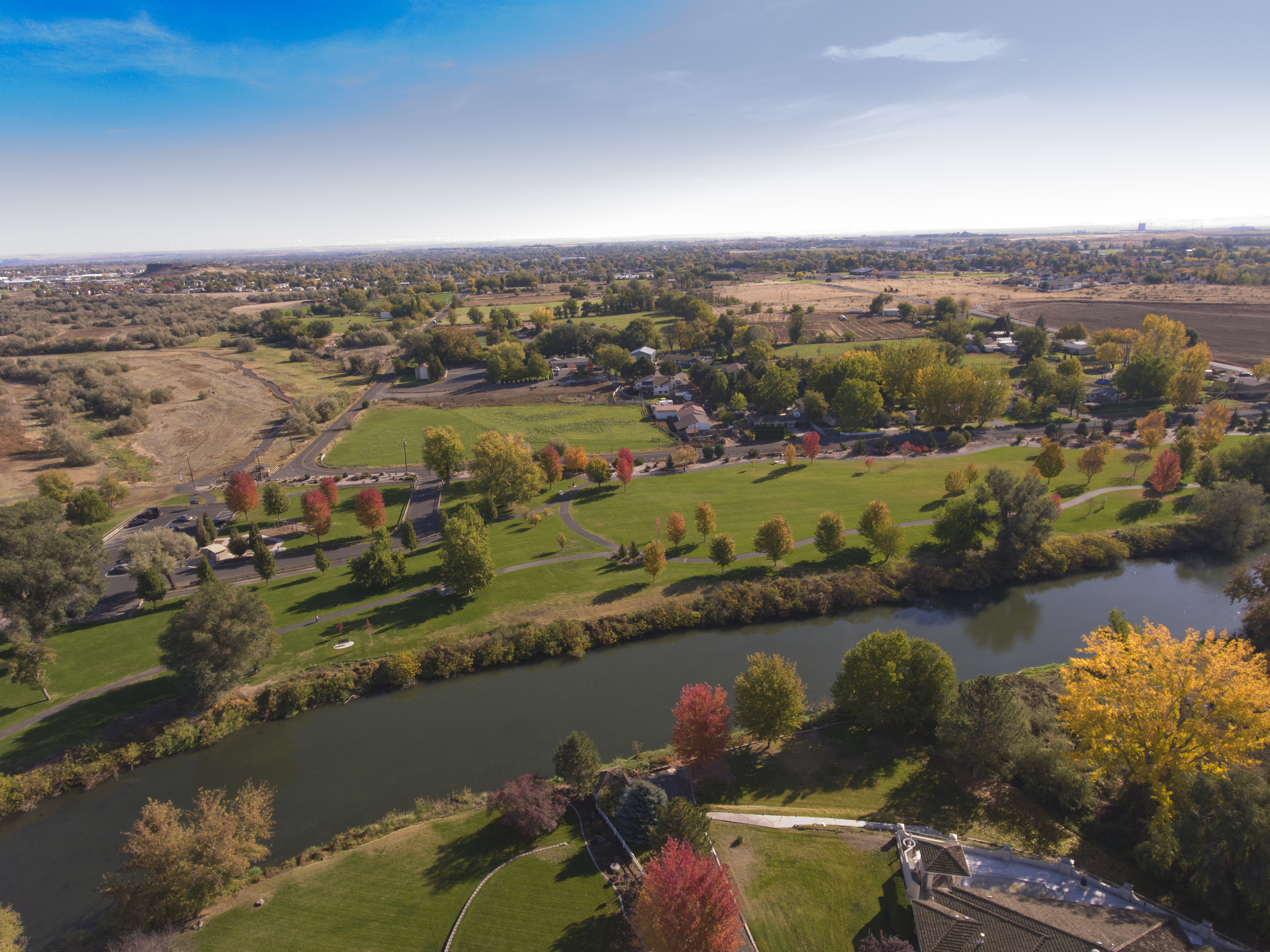
- Riverfront Park & Umatilla River in Hermiston
Map of Hermiston–Pendleton, OR CSA
City of Hermiston
City of Pendleton
Hermiston–Pendleton, OR µSA
- Country: United States
- State: Oregon
- Principal cities: Hermiston; Pendleton
- Time zone: UTC−8 (PST)
  - Summer (DST): UTC−7 (PDT)

The Hermiston–Pendleton micropolitan statistical area, as defined by the United States Census Bureau, is an area consisting of two counties in Oregon anchored by the cities of Hermiston and Pendleton. Although the two communities are generally linked, the Hermiston area has been growing much faster, and is now nearly double the size of the Pendleton area. Portland State University projects that 80% of all growth in the MSA will occur in the immediate Hermiston vicinity between 2016 and 2035.

As of 2023, the area had a population of 94,833, up from 87,062 in 2010. The majority of the population growth over that time period occurred in Umatilla County, with a net increase of 5,937, compared to 1,834 in Morrow County. The area with the most growth centered around Hermiston, which accounted for 3,577 additional residents, along with the city of Umatilla just five miles to the north, which added 904 residents. Combined, the neighboring cities of Hermiston & Umatilla area accounted for 57% of all population growth in the Hermiston-Pendleton Micropolitan Statistical Area.

== Counties ==
- Morrow
- Umatilla

== Communities ==
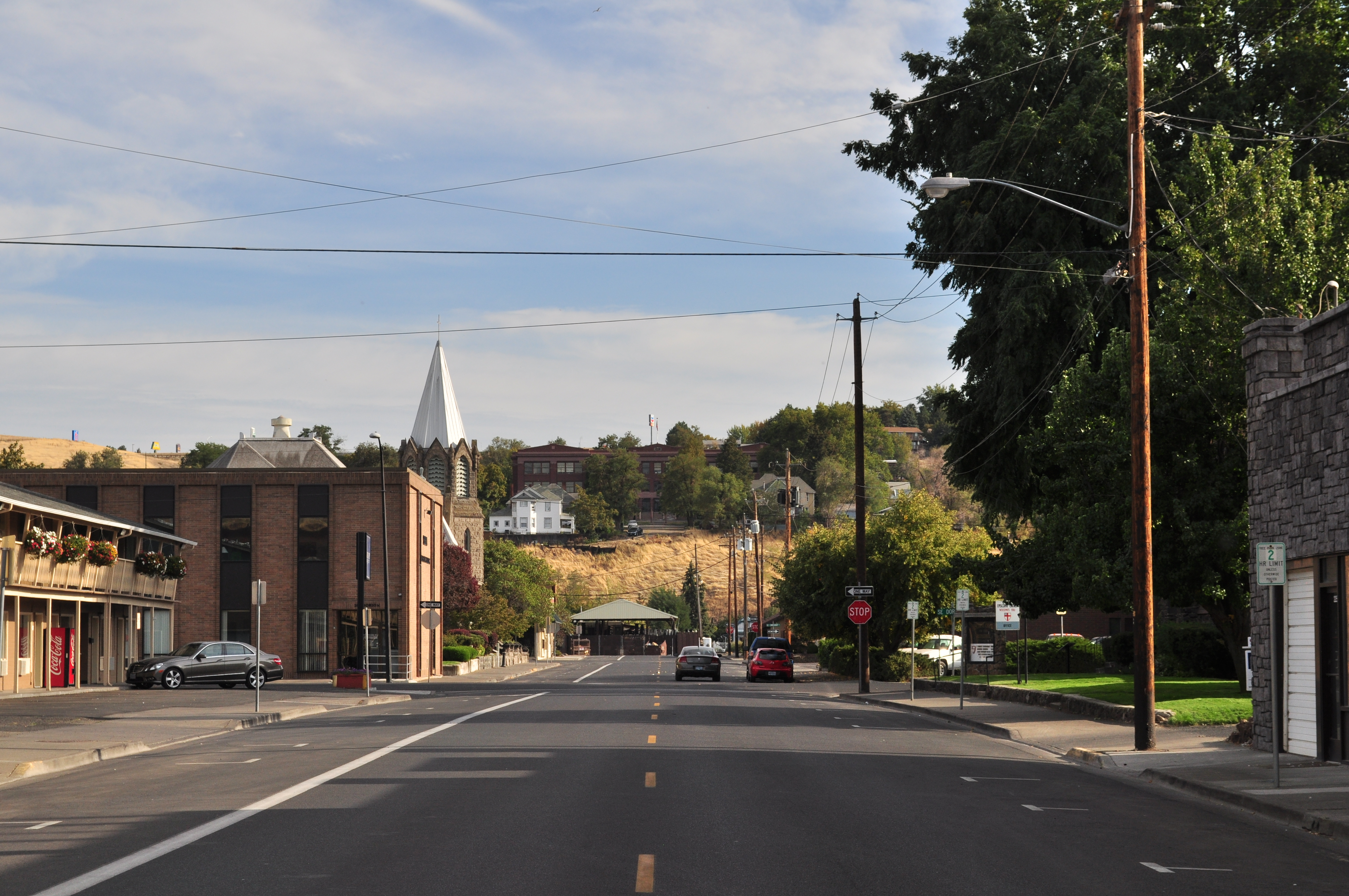
Downtown Pendleton, Umatilla County Seat.

=== With more than 10,000 inhabitants ===
- Hermiston (Principal city and Largest City)
- Pendleton (Principal city and Umatilla County seat)

=== With 1,000 to 10,000 inhabitants ===
- Athena
- Boardman
- Heppner (Morrow County seat)
- Irrigon
- Milton-Freewater
- Mission (census-designated place)
- Pilot Rock
- Stanfield
- Umatilla

=== With fewer than 1,000 inhabitants ===
- Adams
- Cayuse (census-designated place)
- Echo
- Gopher Flats (census-designated place)
- Helix
- Ione
- Kirkpatrick (census-designated place)
- Lexington
- Riverside (census-designated place)
- Tutuilla (census-designated place)
- Ukiah
- Weston

=== Unincorporated ===
- Cecil
- Clarke
- Eightmile
- Ella
- Gooseberry
- Holdman
- Lena
- Meacham
- Morgan
- Nolin
- Pine City
- Rieth
- Ruggs
- Umapine
- Valby

== Demographics ==
As of the census of 2000, there were 81,543 people, 28,971 households, and 20,556 families residing within the μSA. The racial makeup of the μSA was 81.23% White, 0.73% African American, 3.10% Native American, 0.71% Asian, 0.16% Pacific Islander, 11.87% from other races, and 2.20% from two or more races. Hispanic or Latino of any race were 17.23% of the population.

The median income for a household in the μSA was $36,887, and the median income for a family was $41,291. Males had a median income of $31,904 versus $22,606 for females. The per capita income for the μSA was $16,127.

2017 Median Household Incomes Five Largest Cities
Rank	City	Median Income
1	Boardman	$52,348
2	Hermiston	$50,694
3	Pendleton	$47,851
4	Umatilla	$38,796
5	Milton-Freewater	$37,368
