= Morgan, Oregon =

Unincorporated community in the state of Oregon, United States

- Unincorporated community
- Location within Oregon Location within the United States
- Coordinates: 45°33′09″N 119°55′14″W
- Country: United States
- State: Oregon
- County: Morrow
- Elevation: 797 ft (243 m)
- Time zone: UTC-8 (Pacific (PST))
  - Summer (DST): UTC-7 (PDT)
- ZIP code: 97843
- Area codes: 458 and 541
- GNIS feature ID: 1167717

Morgan is an unincorporated community in Morrow County, Oregon, United States. It lies along Oregon Route 74 between Cecil and Ione, northwest of Heppner.

A post office named Saddle, named after nearby Saddle Butte, was established here in 1882. Ozwell T. Douglas was the first postmaster. When the railroad was built through this location in 1889, the railroad station there was named Douglas, after the postmaster, and the post office name was changed to Douglas in 1890. In the first decade of the 20th century, the name of the post office and the railroad station was changed again to Morgan apparently after another local postmaster, Alfred C. Morgan.

== Climate ==
According to the Köppen Climate Classification system, Morgan has a semi-arid climate, abbreviated "BSk" on climate maps.
