= Gooseberry, Oregon =

Former community in the state of Oregon, United States

- Unincorporated community
- Location within Oregon Location within the United States
- Coordinates: 45°17′32″N 119°53′31″W
- Country: United States
- State: Oregon
- County: Morrow
- Elevation: 2,438 ft (743 m)
- Time zone: UTC-8 (Pacific (PST))
  - Summer (DST): UTC-7 (PDT)
- Area codes: 458 and 541
- GNIS feature ID: 1136327

Gooseberry is a former unincorporated community in Morrow County, Oregon, United States. Gooseberry lay along Ione–Gooseberry Road at its intersection with Oregon Route 206 between Heppner to the east and Condon to the west.

== History ==
Cattlemen began referring to the location as Gooseberry Spring as early as 1872. Its name came from a large wild gooseberry bush near the spring. A Gooseberry post office operated in the community from 1884 through 1918.
