= Valby, Oregon =

Unincorporated community in the state of Oregon, United States

- Unincorporated community
- Location within Oregon Location within the United States
- Coordinates: 45°18′59″N 119°50′29″W
- Country: United States
- State: Oregon
- County: Morrow
- Elevation: 2,389 ft (728 m)
- Time zone: UTC-8 (Pacific (PST))
  - Summer (DST): UTC-7 (PDT)
- Area codes: 458 and 541
- GNIS feature ID: 1136860

Valby is an unincorporated community in Morrow County, Oregon, United States. Valby is the site of a Swedish Lutheran church, built in 1897 by settlers of Swedish descent 5 miles (8 km) north of Eightmile. The place name valby or vallby is Swedish for a community of sheepherders. Eightmile is along Oregon Route 206 between Condon and Heppner.

In 1983, an article in The Oregonian described the church and congregation as they were then. About 35 people, many of them descendants of the church founders, were traveling from as far away as 20 miles (32 km) to attend Sunday services conducted by a pastor from Heppner.
