= Valby (disambiguation) =

Valby may refer to:

- Valby, district in comprising the municipality of Copenhagen, Denmark.
- Valby (Gribskov Municipality), village in Gribskov Municipality north of Copenhagen, Denmark
- Valby, Oregon, unincorporated community in the U.S. state of Oregon
- John Valby, musician and comedian
- Valby, former village in Taastrup
