= Times-Journal (Condon) =

Weekly newspaper published in Condon, Oregon

Condon Times-Journal
- Type: Weekly newspaper
- Owner: Bighorn Press
- Founder: H. H. Hendricks
- Publisher: Stephen and Renee Allen
- Editor: Stephen Allen
- Founded: 1886 (as Fossil Journal)
- Language: English
- Headquarters: 19 S. Main St, Condon, OR 97823
- City: Condon, Oregon
- Country: United States
- Website: timesjournal1886.com

The Times-Journal is a newspaper published in Condon in the U.S. state of Oregon. It is a member of the Oregon Newspaper Publishers Association, and reports a circulation of 1,306 to 1,443. The paper is published weekly on Thursdays. The publication is a consolidation of the Fossil Journal (1886), the Condon Globe (1891) and Times (1900). The most recent step in the consolidation between the Journal and the Globe-Times occurred in 1975.

== History ==
=== The Fossil Journal ===
On September 15, 1886, attorney H. H. Hendricks founded the Fossil Journal. At the time Fossil was a town with a population of 300, but Hendricks sought to make money off land-settlement notices. The paper's first editor was Sloan P. Shutt and the paper was printed on a Washington hand-press. Shutt was succeeded by John Hosford followed by Hendricks himself. In 1890, he sold the paper to James S. Stewart. Stewart was a leader in advocating for the formation of a new county, and for naming Fossil its seat. Until at least 1939, the Journal was the only newspaper in Fossil. In 1919, Stewart sold the Journal to Henry J. Simmons. He owned the paper for 33 years until selling to the owners of the Condon Globe-Times.

=== The Condon Globe & The Times ===
In March 1891, Sloan P. Shutt moved the printing plant of the Arlington Advocate to Condon and started The Globe, the city's first newspaper. In February 1898, he sold the paper to S. A. Pattison. Hartshorne & Meresse were publishers in 1909. A year later H. A. Hartshorne was sole owner. In 1900, the Condon Publishing Company founded The Times in Condon with William Christie as editor. In December 1904, Christie sold the paper to Edward Curran, who sold it in 1908 to Maurice Fitzmaurice. In 1919, Fitzmaurice sold the Times to George H. Flagg, who owned the Globe. In the announcement. Fitzmaurice wrote that "the burden of two papers was too much for the town." Flagg merged the two papers to form the Globe-Times. At that time Flagg at once installed a linotype machine and expanded the paper from six to eight pages. Both papers had started with hand-presses with the Times adding a power press in 1906. In 1921, Flagg sold the Globe-Times to N. C. Westcott and W. H Ortman. Westcott, becoming sole owner in 1925. He sold the paper two years later to Lawrence E. Spraker and Burt C. Halsey. A year later Spraker bought out Halsey. In 1937, he sold the paper to Stewart Hardie and Genevieve Dunlop.

=== The Times-Journal ===
In 1951, Stewart Hardie purchased the Fossil Journal from Henry J. Simmons. The papers were sold by Hardie's widow to Richard Zita in January 1959, who then sold them again in 1963 to Clay Brown Hill. In 1974, Andrew Leckie, a Wheeler county judge, sold the two papers to Mac Stinchfield and Rocky Wilson. At that time the paper was printed in two editions, one for Fossil in Wheeler County and one for Condon in Gilliam County. The high cost of printing led the new owners to discontinue the Fossil edition in 1975 and rename the paper to The Times-Journal. In 2019, Macro Graphics Condon, owned by McLaren "Mac" and Janet Stinchfield, sold the Times-Journal to Stephen and Renee Allen.
