= Silas A. Rice Log House =

Historic house in Oregon, United States

- U.S. National Register of Historic Places
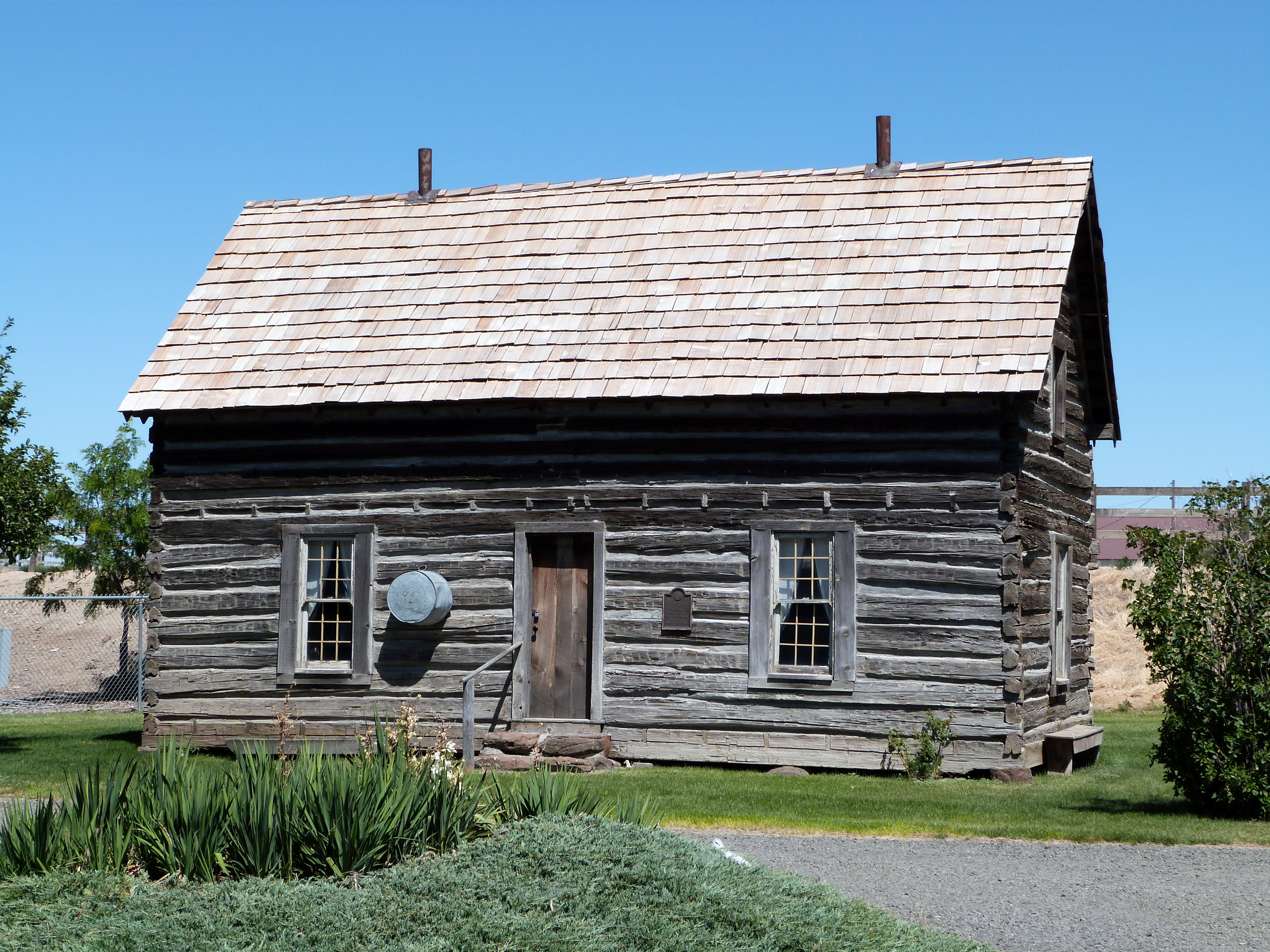
- The Rice House in 2012

- Location within Oregon Location within the United States
- Location: The Gilliam County Historical Society; Condon, Oregon
- Coordinates: 45°14′29″N 120°10′45″W
- Area: 0.3 acres (0.12 ha)
- Built: 1884
- Built by: Silas Adelbert Rice
- Architectural style: Simple pen of hewn logs
- NRHP reference No.: 91001556
- Added to NRHP: October 31, 1991

The Silas A. Rice Log House, located on Oregon Route 19 at Burns Park in Condon, Oregon, is a historic log house built in 1884 as a simple pen of hewn logs. It was listed on the National Register of Historic Places in 1991.

It was a homesteader's cabin and is one of few surviving hewn log houses in a wide area of Oregon. The cabin was named after Silas and Mary Jane Rice who relocated to Gilliam County from Utah in 1884, riding by covered wagon over the Oregon Trail. The cabin is constructed of Douglas fir logs, originally harvested by Silas from the Lost Valley area, about 17 miles southeast of Condon. The cabin was originally located about two miles from its current location, and eventually was abandoned and deteriorated slowly. The cabin was moved by the Gilliam County Historical Society in 1987; it was dismantled and reconstructed by hand and "faithfully {reconstructed}in main part."

== See also ==
- National Register of Historic Places listings in Gilliam County, Oregon
