= Butte Creek Summit =

Mountain pass in Oregon, United States

- Interactive map of Butte Creek Summit
- Elevation: 4,026 ft (1,227 m)
- Traversed by: OR 19

Third Approach
- Location: Wheeler County, Oregon, United States
- Coordinates: 44°54′19.32″N 120°6′33.71″W

Butte Creek Summit (el. 4,026 feet (1,227 m)) is a mountain pass in Oregon traversed by Oregon Route 19.
