= Nye, Oregon =

Unincorporated community in the state of Oregon, United States

- Unincorporated community
- Location within the state of Oregon
- Coordinates: 45°27′37″N 118°58′48″W
- Country: United States
- State: Oregon
- County: Umatilla
- Elevation: 2,310 ft (700 m)
- Time zone: UTC-8 (Pacific (PST))
  - Summer (DST): UTC-7 (PDT)
- Area codes: 458 and 541
- GNIS feature ID: 1136587

Nye is an unincorporated community in Umatilla County, Oregon, United States. It is approximately 8 miles (13 km) west of Pilot Rock, at the junction of U.S. Route 395 and Oregon Route 74.

Nye was named for Adam Wirt "Ad" Nye, an early resident of Umatilla County. Ad Nye named Happy Canyon (later Nolin), which lent its name to part of the festivities of the Pendleton Round-Up. Nye post office ran from 1887 through 1917, after which mail was handled by Pilot Rock. Nye took over the mail from Vinson (formerly Butter Creek) when that office closed in 1907. Henry C. Wright, the postmaster of Nye from its founding through the 19th century, also ran a general store. In 1889, the East Oregonian newspaper claimed it was the only town by that name in the United States.

In 1915, Nye had a grade school and daily stages to Ukiah and Pilot Rock. After the road from Pilot Rock to Nye was paved, a motorcoach ran on that part of the route, while a four-horse stagecoach was used between Nye and Ukiah as late at 1923. Along with general farming, in 1915 the area was known for the raising of "high-class" livestock and wheat.
