= Ella, Oregon =

Unincorporated community in the state of Oregon, United States

- Unincorporated community
- Location within Oregon Location within the United States
- Coordinates: 45°37′52″N 119°48′32″W
- Country: United States
- State: Oregon
- County: Morrow
- Elevation: 810 ft (250 m)
- Time zone: UTC-8 (Pacific (PST))
  - Summer (DST): UTC-7 (PDT)
- Area codes: 458 and 541
- GNIS feature ID: 1136257

Ella is an unincorporated community in Morrow County, Oregon, United States. Ella lies along Immigrant Lane and the Oregon Trail east of Cecil and south of Boardman.

Well Spring, mentioned in many immigrant journals, is 5 miles (8 km) east of Ella along the trail. About 4 miles (6 km) south of Ella is a landform known to immigrants as Well Spring Butte, but later renamed Ella Butte.

Ella had a post office from April 24, 1882, through September 30, 1910. Established at the home of Frank Oviatt, it was named for his daughter Ella, who was told it would be named for her if she stopped crying during a post office planning session. Oviatt became the first postmaster.
