= Arlington Municipal Airport (Oregon) =

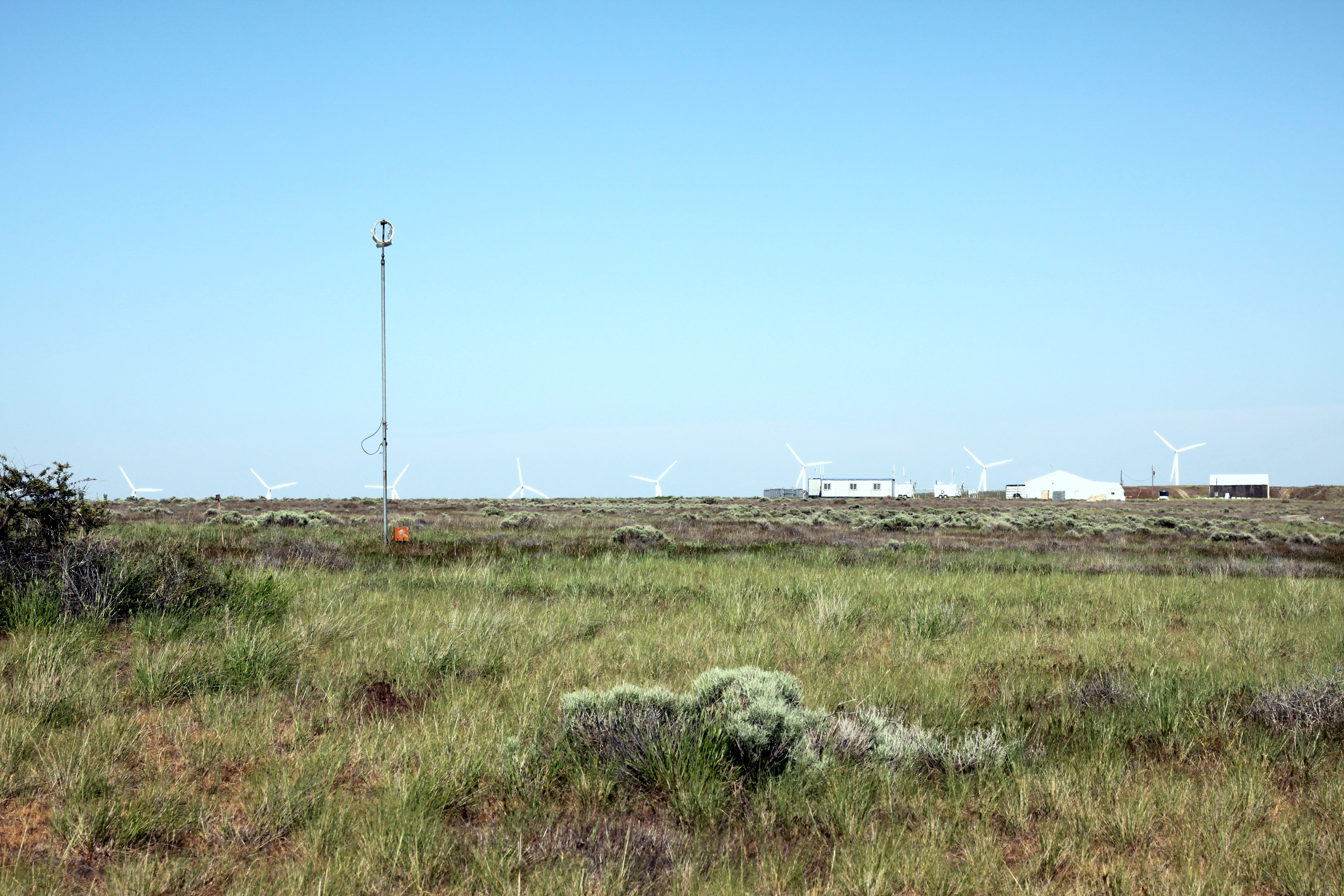
- IATA: none; ICAO: none; FAA LID: 1S8

Summary
- Airport type: Public
- Owner: City of Arlington
- Serves: Arlington, Oregon
- Elevation AMSL: 890 ft (270 m)
- Coordinates: 45°42′59″N 120°10′04″W
- Interactive map of Arlington Municipal Airport

Runways
Direction	Length		Surface
Direction	ft	m	Surface
6/24	5,000	1,524	Dirt

Statistics (2005)
- Aircraft operations: 1,010
- Source: Federal Aviation Administration

Arlington Municipal Airport (FAA LID: 1S8) is a public airport located one mile (2 km) northeast of the central business district of Arlington, in Gilliam County, Oregon, United States. It is owned by the City of Arlington.

== Facilities and aircraft ==
Arlington Municipal Airport covers an area of 80 acres (32 ha) which contains one runway (6/24) with a dirt surface measuring 5,000 x 50 ft (1,524 x 15 m). For the 12-month period ending July 20, 2005, the airport had 1,010 aircraft operations: 99% general aviation and 1% air taxi.

Insitu uses the airport as a testing location for one of their UAVs.
