= Pine City, Oregon =

Unincorporated community in the state of Oregon, United States

- Unincorporated community
- Location within Oregon Location within the United States
- Coordinates: 45°34′52″N 119°25′01″W
- Country: United States
- State: Oregon
- County: Morrow
- Elevation: 1,135 ft (346 m)
- Time zone: UTC-8 (Pacific (PST))
  - Summer (DST): UTC-7 (PDT)
- GNIS feature ID: 1125386

Pine City is an unincorporated community in Morrow County, Oregon, United States. The community lies along Butter Creek, about 3 miles (5 km) south of Butter Creek Junction and Oregon Route 207 between Lexington and Hermiston.
