= Lena, Oregon =

Unincorporated community in the state of Oregon, United States

- Unincorporated community
- Location within Oregon Location within the United States
- Coordinates: 45°23′59″N 119°16′55″W
- Country: United States
- State: Oregon
- County: Morrow
- Elevation: 2,418 ft (737 m)
- Time zone: UTC-8 (Pacific (PST))
  - Summer (DST): UTC-7 (PDT)
- ZIP code: 97836
- Area codes: 458 and 541
- GNIS feature ID: 1136471

Lena is an unincorporated community in Morrow County, Oregon, United States. It is on Oregon Route 74. The community was named by C. E. Hinton, who was Lena's first postmaster, and J. S. Vinson. The post office operated from June 11, 1873, to August 31, 1942. Lena is now served by the Heppner post office.
