= Castle Rock, Morrow County, Oregon =

Unincorporated community in the state of Oregon, United States

Castle Rock, Oregon
- Historic unincorporated community
- Location within Oregon Location within the United States
- Coordinates: 45°50′19″N 119°50′15″W
- Country: United States
- State: Oregon
- County: Morrow
- Elevation: 269 ft (82 m)
- Time zone: UTC−08:00 (Pacific (PST))
  - Summer (DST): UTC−07:00 (PDT)
- GNIS feature ID: 1164257
- Coordinates and elevation from the Geographic Names Information System (GNIS)

Castle Rock was a historic unincorporated community, post office, and railway station in Morrow County, Oregon, United States. They were named for a low bluff along the Columbia River that was said to look like a castle as seen from the river.

The Castle Rock railroad station opened in 1881, and the post office operated from 1883 to 1926. Lake Umatilla, formed in 1968 behind the John Day Dam on the Columbia, inundated the bluff, the railroad bed and the adjacent highway. The railroad station was subsequently moved to higher elevation about a mile south and renamed Castle. Castle Rock was 269 feet (82 m) above sea level, whereas Castle is at 325 feet (99 m).

Castle Rock and Castle are downstream (west) of Boardman and due south of Crow Butte in Benton County in the U.S. state of Washington. Running along the Columbia, Interstate 84 passes by Castle.
