= John David Burns =

American politician

John D. Burns

46th President of the Oregon State Senate
- In office 1971–1972
- Preceded by: Eugene "Debbs" Potts
- Succeeded by: Jason Boe

Member of the Oregon Senate from the 12th/11th district
- In office 1967–1975
- Preceded by: Walter J. Pearson
- Succeeded by: Mary Wendy Roberts
- Constituency: Multnomah County

Personal details
- Born: March 3, 1936 (age 90) Condon, Oregon, U.S.
- Party: Democratic
- Profession: Lawyer

John David Burns was a member of the Oregon State Senate from 1967 to 1975. He served as Senate President from 1971 to 1973.
