= John Day Highway =

Highway in Oregon

John Day Highway No. 5
- John Day Highway highlighted in red

Route information
- Maintained by ODOT
- Length: 270.14 mi (434.75 km)
- Existed: 1917–present
- Component highways: OR 19; US 26

Major junctions
- West end: I-84 / OR 19 near Arlington
- OR 207 in Service Creek; US 26 near Dayville; US 395 at Mount Vernon; OR 7 at Austin Junction
- East end: US 20 in Vale

Location
- Country: United States
- State: Oregon
- Counties: Gilliam, Wheeler, Grant, Baker, Malheur

Highway system
- Oregon Highways; Interstate; US; State; Named; Scenic
← OR 18	OR 19	→ US 20

John Day Highway No. 5 is a highway in eastern Oregon. It comprises Oregon Route 19 (OR 19) and U.S. Route 26 (US 26), as well as short segments of OR 206, OR 207, and US 395.

== Route description ==
The John Day Highway begins at an interchange with Interstate 84, one mile (1.6 km) north of Arlington. It follows OR 19 southward for about 76 miles (122 km), through the cities of Condon and Fossil, where it meets with OR 207 at Service Creek. Here the highway turns eastward and follows OR 207 for 16 miles (26 km) to Spray. At Spray, it splits from OR 207 and goes southward. The highway passes the community of Kimberly, through the John Day Fossil Beds National Monument, and meets up with U.S. 26. The highway then follows US 26 eastward, through the communities of Dayville, Mount Vernon, Prairie City, Unity, Ironside, and Jamieson. The John Day Highway ends at Vale.

The John Day Highway from Fossil to Austin Junction is also a part of the Journey Through Time Scenic Byway, an Oregon state byway.

== Major intersections ==
County	Location	mi	km	Destinations	Notes
Gilliam	Arlington	0.00	0.00	I-84 / US 30 – The Dalles, Pendleton	Two separate directional interchanges; western end of OR 19 overlap
Gilliam	Arlington	0.31	0.50	To I-84 / US 30 – The Dalles, Pendleton	Access to opposite directions
Gilliam	Condon	38.05	61.24	OR 206 west – Wasco	Western end of OR 206 overlap
Gilliam	Condon	38.25	61.56	OR 206 east – Eightmile, Heppner	Eastern end of OR 206 overlap
Wheeler	Fossil	57.50	92.54	OR 218 south – Antelope, Shaniko	
Wheeler	Service Creek	76.94	123.82	OR 207 south – Mitchell, Prineville	Western end of OR 207 overlap
Wheeler		89.21	143.57	OR 207 north – Hardman, Heppner	Eastern end of OR 207 overlap
Grant	Kimberly	98.88	159.13	OR 402 east – Monument, Long Creek	
Grant		117.37	188.89	OR 19 ends / US 26 west – Mitchell, Prineville	Eastern end of OR 19 overlap; western end of US 26 overlap
Grant	Mount Vernon	147.16	236.83	US 395 north – Long Creek, Pendleton	Western end of US 395 overlap
Grant	John Day	155.42	250.12	US 395 south – Canyon City, Burns	Eastern end of US 395 overlap
Grant	Bates	183.76	295.73	OR 7 east – Sumpter, Baker City	
Baker		203.00	326.70	OR 245 north – Hereford, Baker City	
Malheur	Vale	270.08	434.65	US 20 west – City Center, Burns	One-way couplet; eastern end of US 26 overlap
Malheur	Vale	270.14	434.75	US 20 east / US 26 east – Ontario, Nyssa	One-way couplet; eastern end of US 26 overlap
1.000 mi = 1.609 km; 1.000 km = 0.621 mi: Concurrency terminus

== See also ==
- John Day, Oregon
- John Day River
