= Oregon Route 207 =

State highway in Oregon, US

Oregon Route 207
- Route 207 highlighted in red

Route information
- Maintained by ODOT
- Length: 152.30 mi (245.10 km)

Major junctions
- South end: US 26 in Mitchell
- OR 19 in Service Creek; OR 19 near Spray; OR 206 in Ruggs; OR 74 / OR 206 in Heppner; OR 74 in Lexington; I-84 / US 30 near Hinkle; US 395 in Hermiston
- North end: US 730 in Cold Springs Junction

Location
- Country: United States
- State: Oregon

Highway system
- Oregon Highways; Interstate; US; State; Named; Scenic
← OR 206	→ OR 210

Oregon Route 207 is an Oregon state highway running from U.S. Route 26 in Mitchell to U.S. Route 730 near Cold Springs Junction. OR 207 is 152.30 miles (245.10 km) long and runs north–south.

Part of OR 207 is included in the Blue Mountain Scenic Byway.

== Route description ==
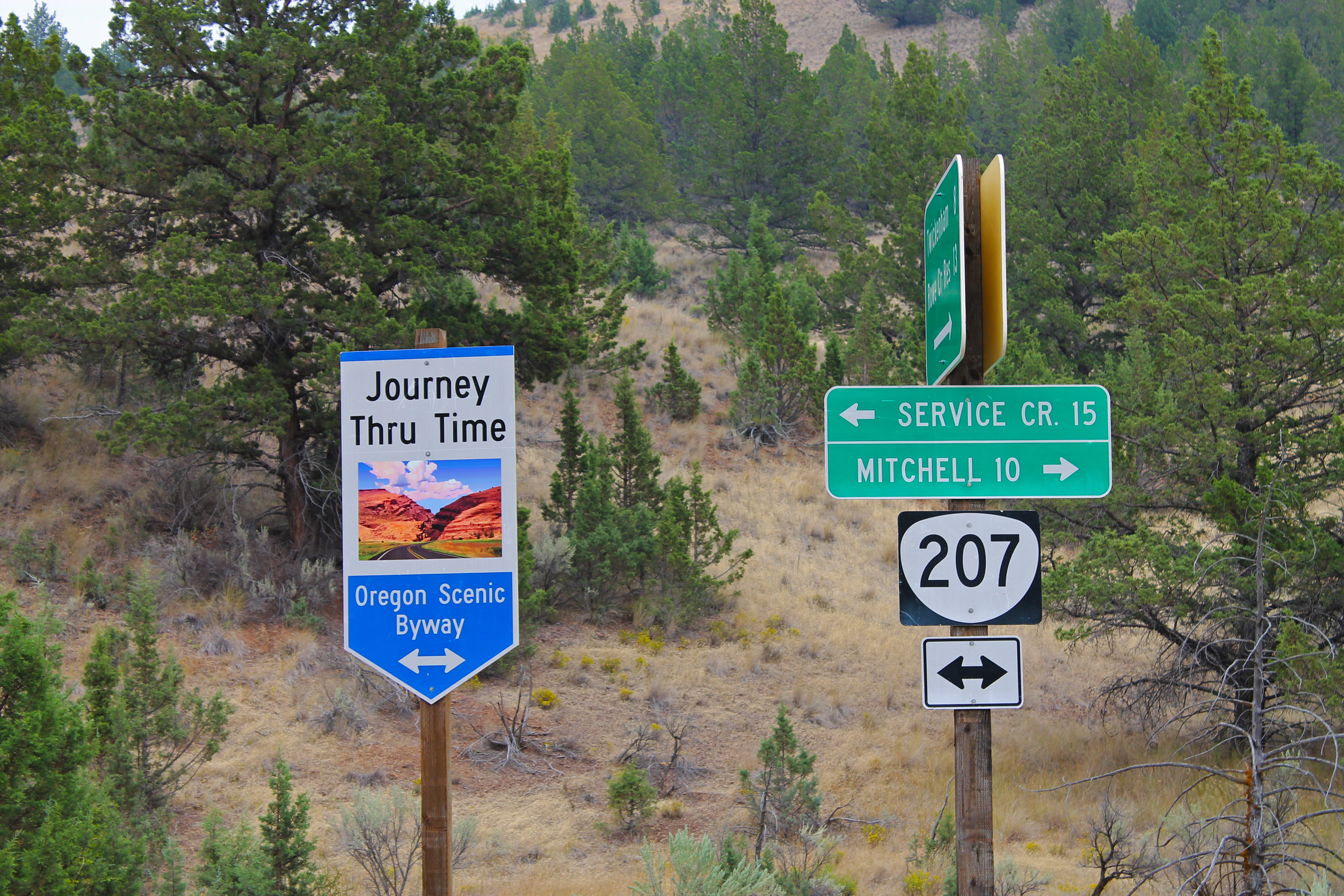
An Oregon Scenic Byway sign on route 207

OR 207 begins at an intersection with US 26 in Mitchell. The route continues northward to an intersection with Oregon Route 19 in Service Creek. The route then overlaps OR 19 and heads east through Spray. East of Spray, the concurrency with OR 19 ends and OR 207 continues north through the Umatilla National Forest and into Morrow County, passing through Hardman and Ruggs. At Ruggs, OR 207 overlaps Oregon Route 206, heading north to Heppner. The concurrency with OR 206 ends at Heppner and OR 207 overlaps Oregon Route 74 and heads north to Lexington. It continues past a turnoff to Echo through Sand Hollow and then crosses Interstate 84. It continues north to Hermiston, where it crosses U.S. Route 395. Then, it heads northeast and ends at U.S. 730 about 2 miles (3 km) west of Cold Springs Junction.

OR 207 consists of the following named highways (see Oregon highways and routes):

- The Service Creek-Mitchell Highway
- Part of the John Day Highway No. 5
- The Heppner-Spray Highway No. 321
- Part of the Wasco-Heppner Highway No. 300
- Part of the Heppner Highway No. 52
- Part of the Lexington-Echo Highway No. 320
- The Hermiston Highway No. 333

== Major intersections ==
Mileposts reset several times along OR 207, and in some cases appear to reverse direction, because Oregon numbers mileposts by highways.

County	Location	mi	km	Destinations	Notes
Wheeler	Mitchell	24.32	39.14	US 26	
Wheeler	Service Creek	78.86 0.00	126.91 0.00	OR 19	Begin concurrency
Wheeler		40.96 95.58	65.92 153.82	OR 19	End concurrency
Morrow	Ruggs	73.33 0.00	118.01 0.00	OR 206	Begin concurrency
Morrow	Heppner	45.89 84.12	73.85 135.38	OR 206; OR 74	End OR 206 concurrency; begin OR 74 concurrency
Morrow	Lexington	0.00 36.45	0.00 58.66	OR 74	End concurrency
Umatilla	Hinkle	12.52	20.15	I-84 / US 30 – Pendleton, The Dalles	I-84 exit 182.
Umatilla	Hermiston	7.05	11.35	US 395	
Umatilla	Cold Springs Junction	0.02	0.032	US 730	
1.000 mi = 1.609 km; 1.000 km = 0.621 mi: Concurrency terminus

== Related routes ==
- U.S. Route 30
