= Clarke, Oregon =

Unincorporated community in the state of Oregon, United States

- Unincorporated community
- Location within Oregon Location within the United States
- Coordinates: 45°50′16″N 119°36′03″W
- Country: United States
- State: Oregon
- County: Morrow
- Elevation: 404 ft (123 m)
- Time zone: UTC-8 (Pacific (PST))
  - Summer (DST): UTC-7 (PDT)
- GNIS feature ID: 1161314

Clarke is an unincorporated community in Morrow County, Oregon, United States. It lies east of Boardman between Interstate 84 to the south and U.S. Route 730 to the north.
