= Morrow County, Oregon =

County in Oregon, United States

- County
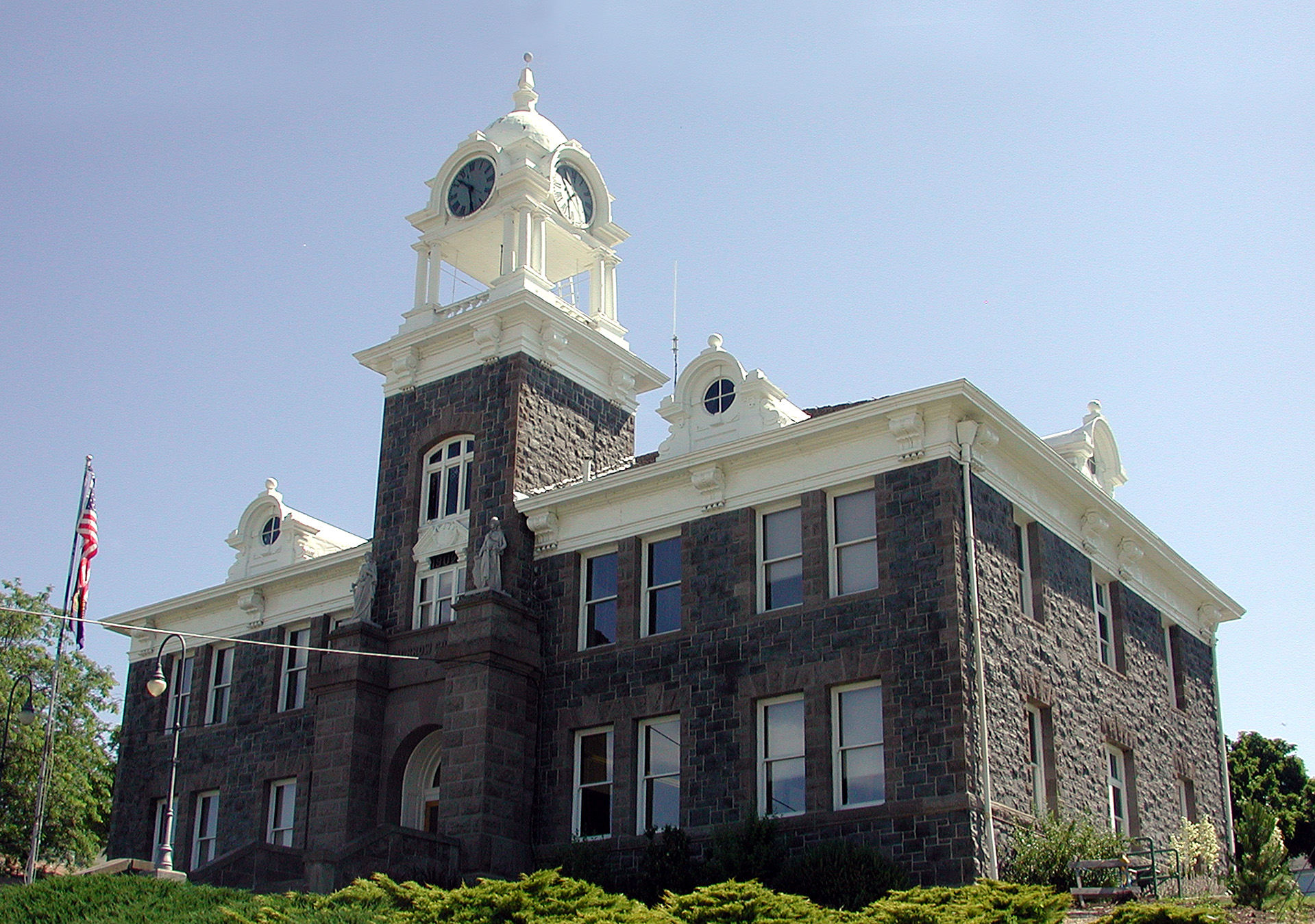
- Morrow County Courthouse in Heppner

- Location within the U.S. state of Oregon
- Coordinates: 45°25′N 119°34′W
- Country: United States
- State: Oregon
- Founded: February 16, 1885
- Named for: Jackson L. Morrow
- Seat: Heppner
- Largest city: Boardman

Area
  - Total: 2,049 sq mi (5,310 km^{2})
  - Land: 2,032 sq mi (5,260 km^{2})
  - Water: 17 sq mi (44 km^{2}) 0.8%

Population (2020)
  - Total: 12,186
  - Estimate (2025): 12,602 ▲
  - Density: 5.997/sq mi (2.315/km^{2})
- Time zone: UTC−8 (Pacific)
  - Summer (DST): UTC−7 (PDT)
- Congressional district: 2nd
- Website: www.morrowcountyor.gov

Morrow County is one of the 36 counties in the U.S. state of Oregon. As of the 2020 census, the population was 12,186. The county seat is Heppner. The county is named for one of its first settlers, Jackson L. Morrow, who was a member of the state legislature when the county was created. Half of the Umatilla Chemical Depot, which includes the Umatilla Chemical Agent Disposal Facility, and the Naval Weapons Systems Training Facility Boardman are located within the county. Morrow County is part of the Pendleton-Hermiston, OR, Micropolitan Statistical Area. It is located on the south side of the Columbia River and is included in the eight-county definition of Eastern Oregon.

== History ==
Morrow County was created in 1885 from the western portion of Umatilla County and a small portion of eastern Wasco County. It is named for Jackson L. Morrow, a state representative who advocated for the county's formation. Heppner was designated the temporary county seat at the time the county was created and narrowly defeated Lexington in the election held in 1887 to determine the permanent county seat.

== Geography ==
Map of Morrow County

Morrow County is located in the eastern portion of Oregon, bounded by the counties of Grant, Gilliam and Umatilla. The county's northern border is defined by the Columbia River. Most of the county is dry and flat, but the southern county contains a section of the Blue Mountains, making it fairly mountainous. The highest point in the county is Black Mountain in Umatilla National Forest at 5,923 ft (1,805 m). Rivers flow from the mountains into the Columbia River.

According to the United States Census Bureau, the county has a total area of 2,049 square miles (5,310 km^{2}), of which 2,032 square miles (5,260 km^{2}) is land and 17 square miles (44 km^{2}) (0.8%) is covered by water.

=== Adjacent counties ===
- Gilliam County - west
- Wheeler County - southwest
- Grant County - south
- Umatilla County - east
- Benton County, Washington - north
- Klickitat County, Washington - northwest

=== National protected areas ===
- Umatilla National Forest (part)
- Umatilla National Wildlife Refuge (part)

== Demographics ==
Historical population
Census	Pop.	Note	%±
1890	4,205		—
1900	4,151		−1.3%
1910	4,357		5.0%
1920	5,617		28.9%
1930	4,941		−12.0%
1940	4,337		−12.2%
1950	4,783		10.3%
1960	4,871		1.8%
1970	4,465		−8.3%
1980	7,519		68.4%
1990	7,625		1.4%
2000	10,995		44.2%
2010	11,173		1.6%
2020	12,186		9.1%
2025 (est.)	12,602	▲	3.4%
U.S. Decennial Census; 1790–1960 1900–1990; 1990–2000 2010–2020

=== 2020 census ===
As of the 2020 census, the county had a population of 12,186. Of the residents, 27.4% were under the age of 18, 15.8% were 65 years of age or older, and the median age was 36.9 years. For every 100 females there were 105.6 males, and for every 100 females age 18 and over there were 106.4 males. Every resident lived in a rural area, with 0.0% living in urban areas.

The racial makeup of the county was 61.3% White, 0.5% Black or African American, 1.4% American Indian and Alaska Native, 0.3% Asian, 0.0% Native Hawaiian and Pacific Islander, 22.8% from some other race, and 13.7% from two or more races. Hispanic or Latino residents comprised 40.9% of the population. Detailed counts for each racial and ethnic group are shown in the table below.

There were 4,214 households in the county, of which 37.9% had children under the age of 18 living with them and 20.0% had a female householder with no spouse or partner present. About 20.9% of all households were made up of individuals and 9.3% had someone living alone who was 65 years of age or older.

There were 4,717 housing units, of which 10.7% were vacant. Among occupied units, 69.3% were owner-occupied and 30.7% were renter-occupied. The homeowner vacancy rate was 0.8% and the rental vacancy rate was 8.9%.

Morrow County, Oregon – Racial and ethnic composition Note: the US Census treats Hispanic/Latino as an ethnic category. This table excludes Latinos from the racial categories and assigns them to a separate category. Hispanics/Latinos may be of any race.
Race / Ethnicity (NH = Non-Hispanic)	Pop 1980	Pop 1990	Pop 2000	Pop 2010	Pop 2020	% 1980	% 1990	% 2000	% 2010	% 2020
White alone (NH)	7,061	6,688	7,911	7,218	6,600	93.91%	87.71%	71.95%	64.60%	54.16%
Black or African American alone (NH)	11	8	14	36	37	0.15%	0.10%	0.13%	0.32%	0.30%
Native American or Alaska Native alone (NH)	41	65	137	112	82	0.55%	0.85%	1.25%	1.00%	0.67%
Asian alone (NH)	23	30	45	100	29	0.31%	0.39%	0.41%	0.90%	0.24%
Native Hawaiian or Pacific Islander alone (NH)	x	x	9	13	5	x	x	0.08%	0.12%	0.04%
Other race alone (NH)	20	9	39	16	44	0.27%	0.12%	0.35%	0.14%	0.36%
Mixed race or Multiracial (NH)	x	x	154	181	401	x	x	1.40%	1.62%	3.29%
Hispanic or Latino (any race)	363	825	2,686	3,497	4,988	4.83%	10.82%	24.43%	31.30%	40.93%
Total	7,519	7,625	10,995	11,173	12,186	100.00%	100.00%	100.00%	100.00%	100.00%

=== 2010 census ===
As of the 2010 census, there were 11,173 people, 3,916 households, and 2,953 families living in the county. The population density was 5.5 inhabitants per square mile (2.1/km^{2}). There were 4,442 housing units at an average density of 2.2 units per square mile (0.85 units/km^{2}). The racial makeup of the county was 77.7% white, 1.2% American Indian, 0.9% Asian, 0.5% black or African American, 0.1% Pacific islander, 16.9% from other races, and 2.6% from two or more races. Those of Hispanic or Latino origin made up 31.3% of the population. In terms of ancestry, 19.5% were German, 13.1% were English, 10.7% were Irish, and 5.0% were American.

Of the 3,916 households, 37.7% had children under the age of 18 living with them, 59.7% were married couples living together, 9.6% had a female householder with no husband present, 24.6% were non-families, and 19.1% of all households were made up of individuals. The average household size was 2.85 and the average family size was 3.25. The median age was 36.5 years.

The median income for a household in the county was $43,902 and the median income for a family was $49,868. Males had a median income of $38,045 versus $30,173 for females. The per capita income for the county was $20,201. About 12.4% of families and 15.3% of the population were below the poverty line, including 21.7% of those under age 18 and 3.9% of those age 65 or over.

=== 2000 census ===
As of the 2000 census, there were 10,995 people, 3,776 households, and 2,718 families living in the county. The population density was 5 people per square mile (1.9 people/km^{2}). There were 4,296 housing units at an average density of 2 units per square mile (0.77/km^{2}). The racial makeup of the county was 76.27% White, 0.14% Black or African American, 1.42% Native American, 0.45% Asian, 0.08% Pacific Islander, 19.54% from other races, and 2.14% from two or more races. 24.43% of the population were Hispanic or Latino of any race. 13.6% were of German, 12.8% American, 8.3% Irish, and 8.0% English ancestry. 77.3% spoke English and 22.3% Spanish as their first language.

There were 3,776 households, out of which 38.91% had children under the age of 18 living with them, 62.60% were married couples living together, 8.87% had a female householder with no husband present, and 22.70% were non-families. 18.13% of all households were made up of individuals, and 7.40% had someone living alone who was 65 years of age or older. The average household size was 2.90 and the average family size was 3.28.

In the county, the population was spread out, with 30.80% under the age of 18, 8.90% from 18 to 24, 27.30% from 25 to 44, 22.40% from 45 to 64, and 10.60% who were 65 years of age or older. The median age was 33 years. For every 100 females, there were 106.50 males. For every 100 females age 18 and over, there were 106.10 males.

The median income for a household in the county was $37,525, and the median income for a family was $40,731. Males had a median income of $32,328 versus $22,887 for females. The per capita income for the county was $15,843. 14.80% of the population and 11.30% of families were below the poverty line. Out of the total population, 21.60% of those under the age of 18 and 10.1% of those 65 and older were living below the poverty line.

== Politics ==
Like all counties in eastern Oregon, the majority of registered voters who are part of a political party in Morrow County are members of the Republican Party. No Democratic presidential nominee has won a clear majority in Morrow County since Lyndon Johnson in 1964, though Jimmy Carter and Bill Clinton both won pluralities here in 1976 and 1996, respectively (and it was just 13 votes shy of voting Democratic in 1992). In the 2008 presidential election 61.94% of Morrow County voters voted for Republican John McCain, while 34.62% voted for Democrat Barack Obama and 3.44% of voters either voted for a third-party candidate or wrote in a candidate. These numbers show a slight shift towards the Democratic candidate when compared to the 2004 presidential election, in which 65.9% of Morrow Country voters voted for George W. Bush, while 32.8% voted for John Kerry, and 1.4% of voters either voted for a third-party candidate or wrote in a candidate. However, it shifted back in 2012 and 2016, with Mitt Romney and Donald Trump both receiving roughly 65% of the vote.

United States presidential election results for Morrow County, Oregon
Year	Republican		Democratic		Third party(ies)	
Year	No.	%	No.	%	No.	%
1904	875	65.10%	230	17.11%	239	17.78%
1908	680	62.10%	272	24.84%	143	13.06%
1912	447	42.57%	275	26.19%	328	31.24%
1916	748	44.08%	830	48.91%	119	7.01%
1920	1,186	68.75%	451	26.14%	88	5.10%
1924	991	53.34%	397	21.37%	470	25.30%
1928	1,093	64.87%	543	32.23%	49	2.91%
1932	579	36.16%	929	58.03%	93	5.81%
1936	518	27.64%	1,181	63.02%	175	9.34%
1940	758	43.34%	979	55.97%	12	0.69%
1944	747	46.80%	836	52.38%	13	0.81%
1948	751	46.30%	838	51.66%	33	2.03%
1952	1,254	61.32%	786	38.44%	5	0.24%
1956	1,092	55.01%	893	44.99%	0	0.00%
1960	1,003	49.12%	1,039	50.88%	0	0.00%
1964	627	29.90%	1,470	70.10%	0	0.00%
1968	1,068	54.30%	797	40.52%	102	5.19%
1972	1,059	52.77%	718	35.77%	230	11.46%
1976	1,091	46.09%	1,162	49.09%	114	4.82%
1980	1,728	55.01%	1,077	34.29%	336	10.70%
1984	2,130	62.70%	1,254	36.91%	13	0.38%
1988	1,529	51.48%	1,375	46.30%	66	2.22%
1992	1,187	34.17%	1,174	33.79%	1,113	32.04%
1996	1,381	41.46%	1,426	42.81%	524	15.73%
2000	2,224	61.62%	1,197	33.17%	188	5.21%
2004	2,732	65.85%	1,361	32.80%	56	1.35%
2008	2,509	61.83%	1,410	34.75%	139	3.43%
2012	2,532	65.22%	1,202	30.96%	148	3.81%
2016	2,721	65.30%	1,017	24.41%	429	10.30%
2020	3,586	70.07%	1,371	26.79%	161	3.15%
2024	3,408	72.02%	1,138	24.05%	186	3.93%

The county is governed through a statutory board of commission form of government. Commissioners are elected at-large and represent the entire county rather than a specific district.

As of 2025 the commissioners were:

- David Sykes (elected 2022)
- Jeff Wenholz (elected 2022)
- August Peterson (elected 2024)

== Economy ==
The principal industries in the county today include agriculture, food processing, lumber, livestock, and recreation. The Columbia River also provides Morrow County with a number of related jobs. The Port of Morrow, situated on the Columbia River near the city of Boardman, was established in 1957.

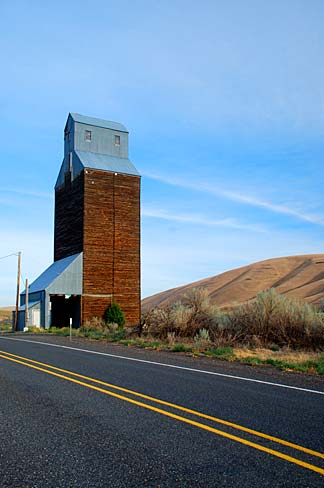
A grain elevator just outside Ione

Early cattlemen found an abundance of rye along the creek bottoms of the region and drove their herds into the area to forage on these natural pastures. Ranching was the primary economic force in the county for many years. Increased settlement, the enclosure of the free grazing lands and diminished pastures due to overgrazing, resulted in the decline of ranching during the 19th century, and farming became predominant. The completion of rail lines into the county in 1883 increased access to markets and encouraged wheat production in the area. The advent of technology for center pivot irrigation has been a further stimulus to the local economy.

Two natural gas-fired plants are located at the Port of Morrow; Coyote Springs I (255-276 MW), owned and operated by Portland General Electric; and Coyote Springs II (241-280 MW; PGE operator) owned by Avista Corp.

In 2022, it was reported that Amazon intends to build at least five commercial data centers in Morrow County. The company is reportedly pursuing a package of tax breaks to pursue construction of these centers, a project worth almost $12 billion total.

== Transportation ==
=== Airports ===
- Boardman Airport
- Lexington Airport

=== Major roads ===
- Interstate 84
- U.S. Route 30
  - U.S. Route 730
- Oregon Route 74
- Oregon Route 206
- Oregon Route 207

== Communities ==
=== Cities ===
- Boardman
- Heppner (county seat)
- Ione
- Irrigon
- Lexington

=== Unincorporated communities ===
- Cecil
- Clarke
- Eightmile
- Ella
- Gooseberry
- Lena
- Morgan
- Pine City
- Ruggs
- Valby

=== Former communities ===
- Castle Rock
- Hardman

== See also ==
- National Register of Historic Places listings in Morrow County, Oregon
