= Oregon Route 206 =

State highway in northern Oregon, US

Oregon Route 206
- Route 206 highlighted in red

Route information
- Maintained by ODOT
- Length: 99.71 mi (160.47 km)

Location
- Country: United States
- State: Oregon

Highway system
- Oregon Highways; Interstate; US; State; Named; Scenic
← OR 205	→ OR 207

Oregon Route 206 is an Oregon state highway located in the north-central part of the state. It runs from Interstate 84 at Celilo Village to a junction with Oregon Route 74 and Oregon Route 207 in Heppner. Aside from Interstate 84, Oregon Route 206 is the main east–west highway in Gilliam County and provides access from the Portland metropolitan area to the John Day area. The highway is known as the Wasco-Heppner Highway No. 300 (see Oregon highways and routes), except for the section between Celilo Village and Wasco, which is called the Celilo-Wasco Highway No. 301.

== Major intersections ==
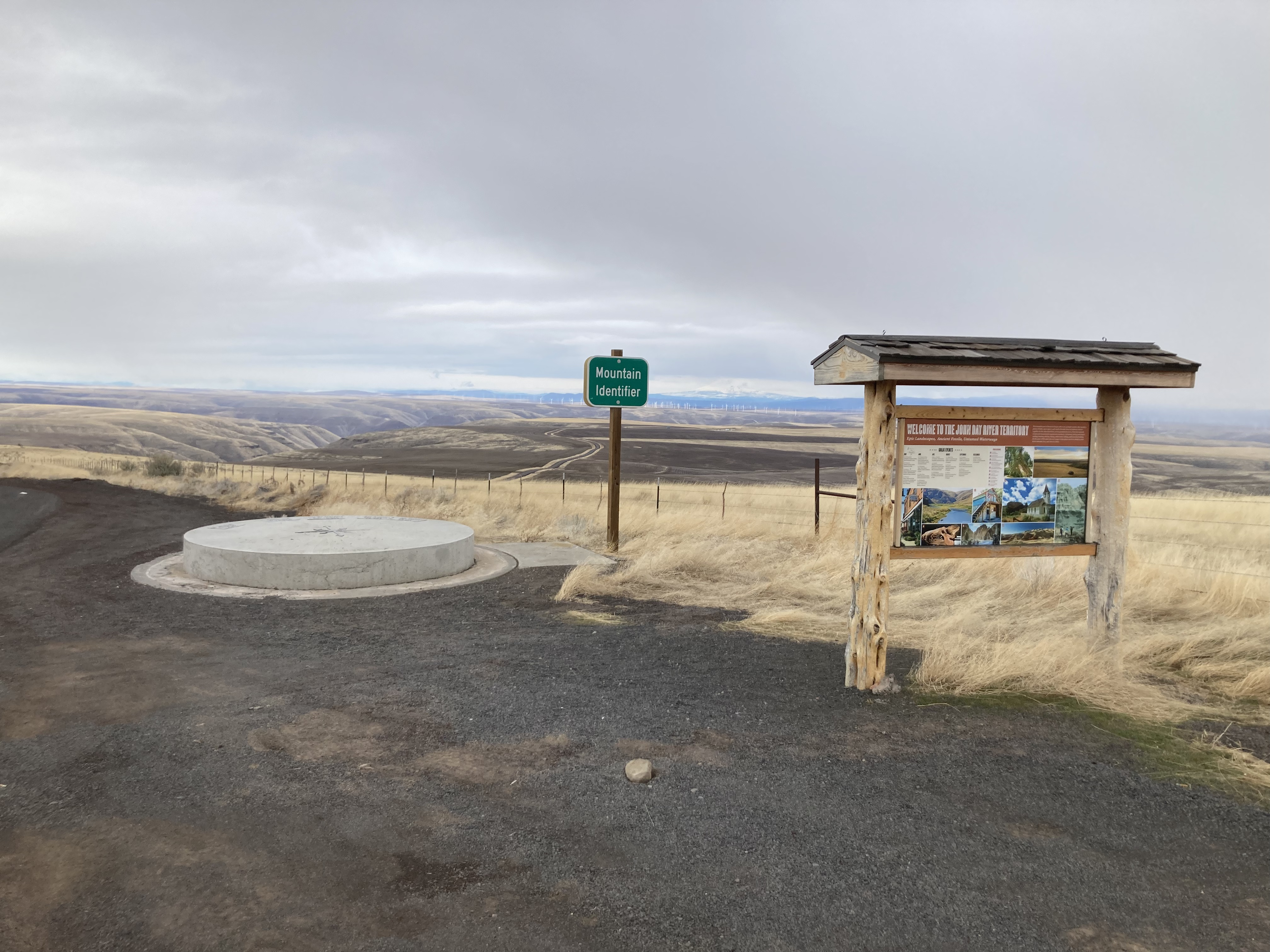
Mountain Identifier on side of Route 206

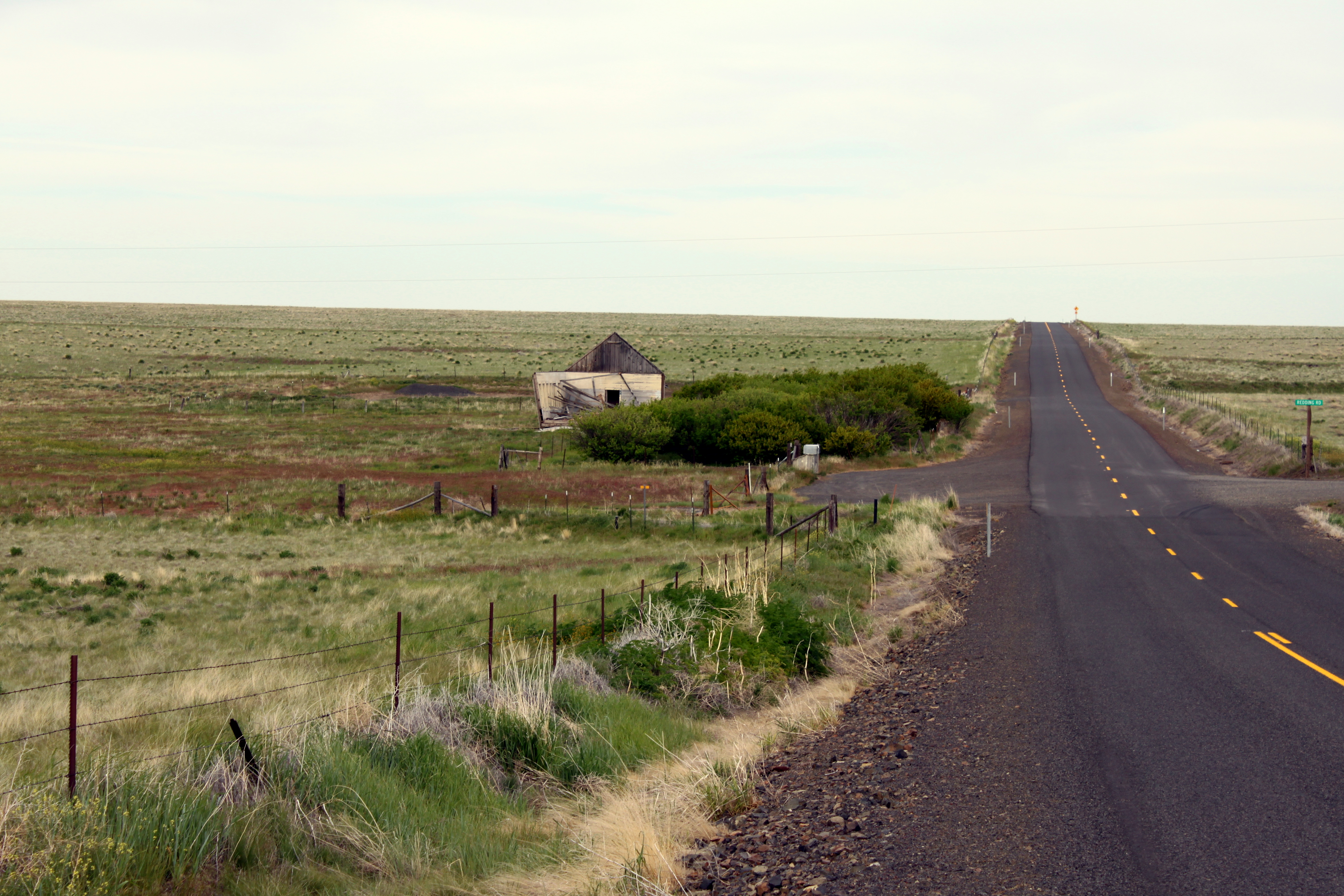
Abandoned building by Route 206 in Eightmile, Oregon

County	Location	mi	km	Destinations	Notes
Wasco	Celilo Village	0.00	0.00	I-84 / US 30 – The Dalles, Pendleton	
Sherman	Wasco	14.73	23.71	US 97 – The Dalles, Bend	
Sherman	Wasco	15.57	25.06	Celilo–Wasco Highway No. 301 ends	
Gilliam	Condon	56.27	90.56	OR 19 north – Arlington	Western end of OR 19 overlap
Gilliam	Condon	56.47	90.88	OR 19 south – Fossil, John Day	Eastern end of OR 19 overlap
Morrow	Ruggs	88.92	143.10	OR 207 south – Hardman, Spray	Western end of OR 207 overlap
Morrow	Heppner	99.71	160.47	OR 74 / OR 207 north – Arlington, Pendleton	Eastern end of OR 207 overlap
1.000 mi = 1.609 km; 1.000 km = 0.621 mi: Concurrency terminus; Route transition
