= Oregon Route 74 =

State highway in northern Oregon, US

Oregon Route 74
- Route 74 highlighted in red

Route information
- Maintained by ODOT
- Length: 85.09 mi (136.94 km)

Major junctions
- West end: I-84 / US 30 in Heppner Junction
- OR 207 in Lexington; OR 207 in Heppner
- East end: US 395 in Nye

Location
- Country: United States
- State: Oregon

Highway system
- Oregon Highways; Interstate; US; State; Named; Scenic
← OR 70	→ OR 78

Oregon Route 74 is an Oregon, U.S. state highway running from Interstate 84 in Gilliam County to U.S. Route 395 in Umatilla County. OR 74 is known as the Heppner Highway No. 52 (see Oregon highways and routes). It is 83.05 miles (133.66 km) long and runs east–west.

Part of OR 74 is included in the Blue Mountain Scenic Byway.

== Route description ==
OR 74 begins at an intersection with I-84 approximately 11 miles (18 km) east of Arlington at Heppner Junction. It heads southeast through Ione to Lexington. At Lexington, OR 74 overlaps OR 207 and continues southeast to Heppner. The concurrency ends at Heppner, and OR 74 continues east to Nye, ending at an intersection with US 395.

== Major intersections ==
County	Location	mi	km	Destinations	Notes
Gilliam		0.00	0.00	I-84 / US 30 – Pendleton, Arlington	Interchange
Morrow	Lexington	36.42	58.61	OR 207 north – Boardman, Hermiston, Pendleton	Western end of OR 207 overlap
Morrow	Heppner	45.86	73.80	OR 206 / OR 207 south – Condon, Spray	Eastern end of OR 207 overlap
Umatilla	Nye	85.09	136.94	US 395 – Pilot Rock, Pendleton, Ukiah, John Day	
1.000 mi = 1.609 km; 1.000 km = 0.621 mi: Concurrency terminus
