= Cecil, Oregon =

Unincorporated community in the state of Oregon, United States

- Unincorporated community
- Location within Oregon Location within the United States
- Coordinates: 45°37′04″N 119°57′32″W
- Country: United States
- State: Oregon
- County: Morrow
- Elevation: 630 ft (190 m)
- Time zone: UTC-8 (Pacific)
  - Summer (DST): UTC-7 (Pacific)
- Area code: 541
- GNIS feature ID: 1167698

Cecil is an unincorporated community in Morrow County, Oregon, United States. It is approximately 14 miles (23 km) northwest of Ione, on Oregon Route 74. The Oregon Trail crossed Willow Creek here, and it was once an important stagecoach stop.

Cecil was the name of a railroad station on the Heppner Branch of the Union Pacific railroad. In 1867, a post office named "Cecils" was established a mile south of the station; it ran until 1870. Cecil post office was established in 1902 and closed in 1974. The Cecil family, including William Cecil, a pioneer of 1862, owned large amounts of land in the area and donated the site for the post office.

In 1940, Cecil had a population of 15. As of 1993, Cecil had a store and gas station. The store is no longer operating. In 1993, the Union Pacific Railroad filed for abandonment of the Heppner Branch. The last train ran on the line on June 30, 1994, and all traces of the line including bridges, tracks, and depots were gone by August 1994.
