= Ione, Oregon =

- City
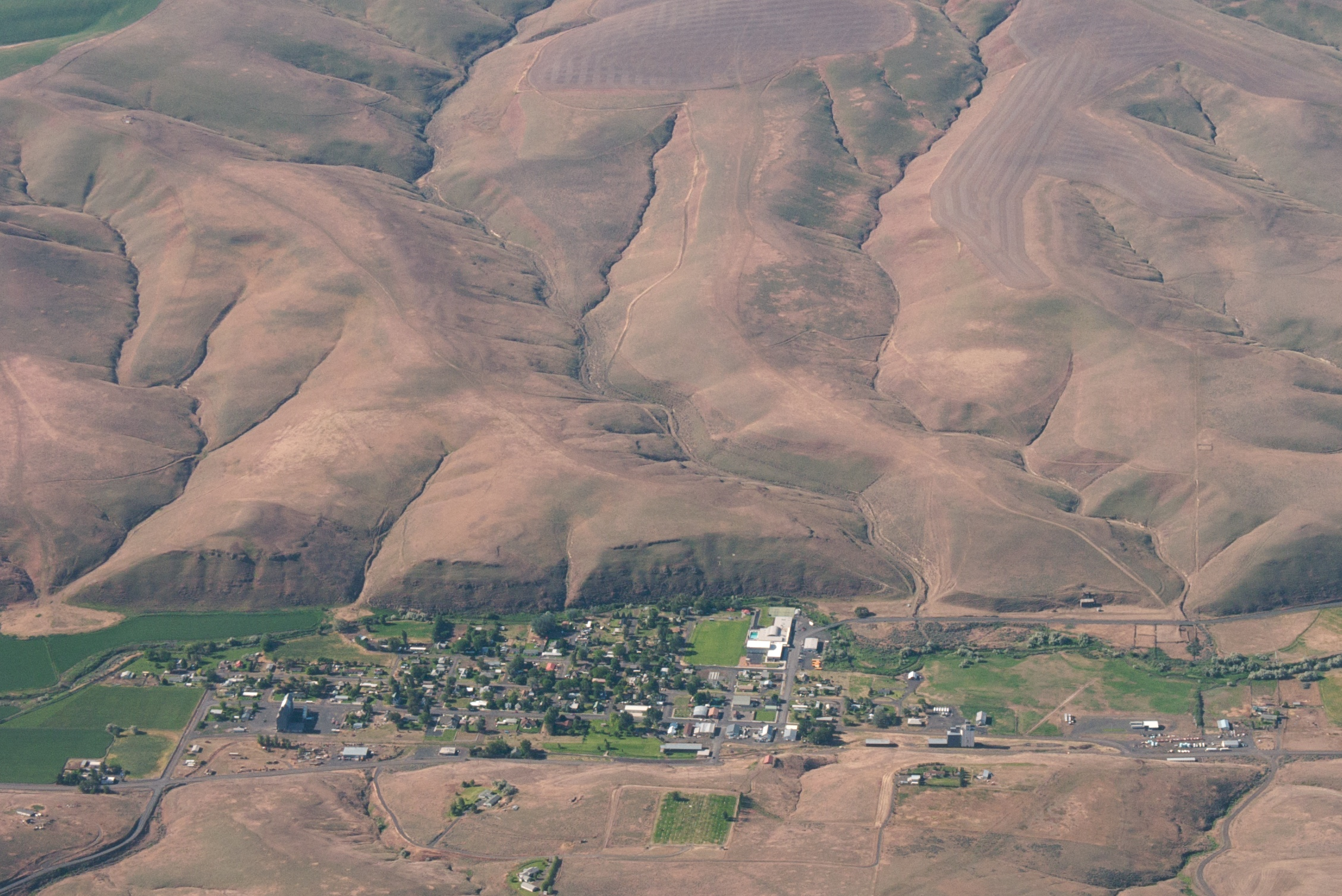
- Aerial view of Ione
- Motto: Growing with Pride
- Location in Morrow County and the state of Oregon
- Coordinates: 45°30′3″N 119°49′28″W
- Country: United States
- State: Oregon
- County: Morrow
- Incorporated: 1903

Government
  - Mayor: Jesse Shoemake

Area
  - Total: 0.76 sq mi (1.96 km^{2})
  - Land: 0.76 sq mi (1.96 km^{2})
  - Water: 0 sq mi (0.00 km^{2})
- Elevation: 1,096 ft (334 m)

Population (2020)
  - Total: 337
  - Density: 444.2/sq mi (171.51/km^{2})
- Time zone: UTC-8 (Pacific)
  - Summer (DST): UTC-7 (Pacific)
- ZIP code: 97843
- Area codes: 458 and 541
- FIPS code: 41-36400
- GNIS feature ID: 2410111
- Website: cityofioneoregon.gov

Ione is a city in Morrow County, Oregon, United States. The population was 337 at the 2020 census. It is part of the Pendleton–Hermiston Micropolitan Statistical Area.

== History ==
In 1883, landowner E. G. Sperry named the community "Ione" after Ione Arthur, a girl who was visiting the Sperrys with her family. Aaron Royse managed the first store in Ione, and he became the first postmaster when an Ione post office was established in 1884.

Sheep ranching was important in the region during the days of early settlement by non-natives. It continues in the 21st century and has been joined by wheat farming and cattle ranching as significant uses of the land.

== Geography ==
Ione is in western Morrow County at an elevation of 1,089 feet (332 m), 25 miles (40 km) south of the Columbia River and 30 miles (48 km) northwest of the Blue Mountains. It is along Oregon Route 74, 18 miles (29 km) northwest of Heppner, 27 miles (43 km) south of Interstate 84 (I-84), and 164 miles (264 km) east of Portland.

Willow Creek flows through Ione, which is downstream of Heppner and Lexington and upstream of Arlington. According to the U.S. Census Bureau, Ione has an area of 0.76 square miles (1.97 km^{2}), all land.

Route 74 forms part of the Blue Mountain Scenic Byway, a 130-mile (210 km) set of roads connecting I-84 along the Columbia River with the North Fork John Day River in the Blue Mountains. Part of the route follows the Willow Creek drainage through Ione.

=== Climate ===
This region experiences warm (but not hot) and dry summers, with no average monthly temperatures above 71.6 °F (22.0 °C). According to the Köppen climate classification system, Ione has a warm-summer Mediterranean climate, Csb on climate maps.

== Demographics ==
Historical population
Census	Pop.	Note	%±
1900	223		—
1910	239		7.2%
1920	439		83.7%
1930	283		−35.5%
1940	262		−7.4%
1950	262		0.0%
1960	350		33.6%
1970	355		1.4%
1980	345		−2.8%
1990	255		−26.1%
2000	321		25.9%
2010	329		2.5%
2020	337		2.4%

=== 2020 census ===
As of the 2020 census, Ione had a population of 337. The median age was 46.4 years. 25.2% of residents were under the age of 18 and 16.3% of residents were 65 years of age or older. For every 100 females there were 120.3 males, and for every 100 females age 18 and over there were 119.1 males age 18 and over.

0% of residents lived in urban areas, while 100.0% lived in rural areas.

There were 133 households in Ione, of which 39.1% had children under the age of 18 living in them. Of all households, 51.9% were married-couple households, 21.1% were households with a male householder and no spouse or partner present, and 15.0% were households with a female householder and no spouse or partner present. About 15.8% of all households were made up of individuals and 7.5% had someone living alone who was 65 years of age or older.

There were 147 housing units, of which 9.5% were vacant. Among occupied housing units, 69.9% were owner-occupied and 30.1% were renter-occupied. The homeowner vacancy rate was <0.1% and the rental vacancy rate was 13.0%.

Racial composition as of the 2020 census
Race	Number	Percent
White	255	75.7%
Black or African American	2	0.6%
American Indian and Alaska Native	1	0.3%
Asian	1	0.3%
Native Hawaiian and Other Pacific Islander	0	0%
Some other race	31	9.2%
Two or more races	47	13.9%
Hispanic or Latino (of any race)	64	19.0%

=== 2010 census ===
As of the census of 2010, there were 329 people, 132 households, and 90 families residing in the city. The population density was 506.2 inhabitants per square mile (195.4/km^{2}). There were 154 housing units at an average density of 236.9 per square mile (91.5/km^{2}). The racial makeup of the city was 86.6% White, 0.9% Native American, 0.6% Asian, 8.2% from other races, and 3.6% from two or more races. Hispanic or Latino of any race were 11.9% of the population.

There were 132 households, of which 34.8% had children under the age of 18 living with them, 61.4% were married couples living together, 3.0% had a female householder with no husband present, 3.8% had a male householder with no wife present, and 31.8% were non-families. 24.2% of all households were made up of individuals, and 12.9% had someone living alone who was 65 years of age or older. The average household size was 2.49 and the average family size was 3.03.

The median age in the city was 42.3 years. 24.6% of residents were under the age of 18; 8.9% were between the ages of 18 and 24; 19.4% were from 25 to 44; 32.5% were from 45 to 64; and 14.6% were 65 years of age or older. The gender makeup of the city was 52.0% male and 48.0% female.

=== 2000 census ===
As of the census of 2000, there were 321 people, 127 households, and 86 families residing in the city. The population density was 551.8 inhabitants per square mile (213.1/km^{2}). There were 142 housing units at an average density of 244.1 per square mile (94.2/km^{2}). The racial makeup of the city was 97.82% White, and 2.18% from two or more races. Hispanic or Latino of any race were 3.12% of the population.

There were 127 households, out of which 32.3% had children under the age of 18 living with them, 59.1% were married couples living together, 6.3% had a female householder with no husband present, and 31.5% were non-families. 29.1% of all households were made up of individuals, and 10.2% had someone living alone who was 65 years of age or older. The average household size was 2.53 and the average family size was 3.09.

In the city, the population was spread out, with 28.3% under the age of 18, 5.6% from 18 to 24, 29.6% from 25 to 44, 20.6% from 45 to 64, and 15.9% who were 65 years of age or older. The median age was 38 years. For every 100 females, there were 112.6 males. For every 100 females age 18 and over, there were 111.0 males.

The median income for a household in the city was $37,500, and the median income for a family was $43,750. Males had a median income of $32,143 versus $21,250 for females. The per capita income for the city was $14,531. About 5.8% of families and 6.2% of the population were below the poverty line, including 5.3% of those under age 18 and 9.7% of those age 65 or over.

== Economy and education ==
Ione Community Charter School, is located in Morrow County, Oregon in the town of Ione. We serve a small farming community with approximately 120 students, in grades Pre K - 12. We are a charter school in our own school district.

As of 2002, the top employers for Ione were the Ione Community School and—all in Heppner—the Columbia Basin Electric Co-op, Miller & Sons Welding, and the Heppner Gazette-Times (a weekly newspaper).
