= Arlington, Oregon =

- City
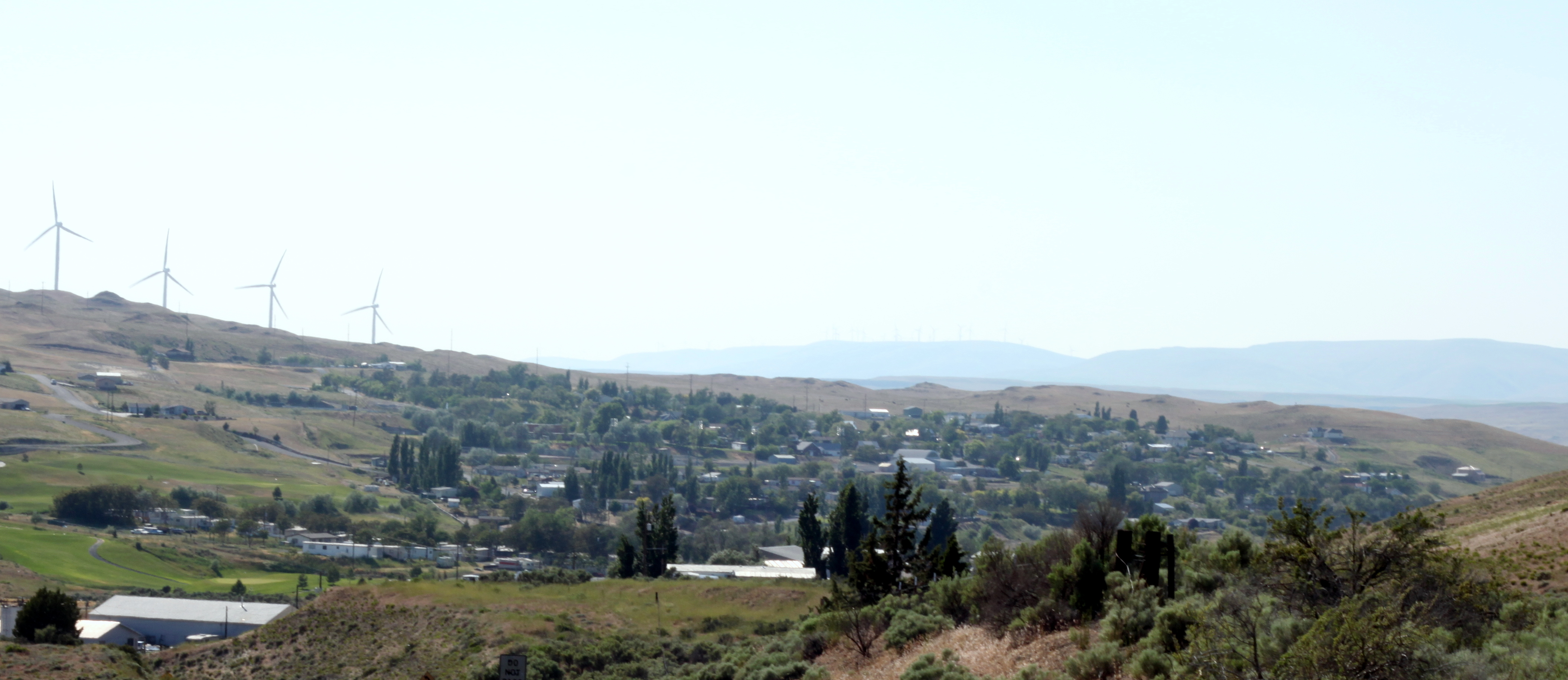
- Community of Arlington

- Location in Oregon
- Coordinates: 45°42′54″N 120°11′59″W
- Country: United States
- State: Oregon
- County: Gilliam
- Incorporated: 1885

Government
  - Mayor: Jeff Bufton

Area
  - Total: 3.17 sq mi (8.21 km^{2})
  - Land: 2.55 sq mi (6.60 km^{2})
  - Water: 0.62 sq mi (1.61 km^{2})
- Elevation: 285 ft (87 m)

Population (2020)
  - Total: 628
  - Density: 246/sq mi (95.1/km^{2})
- Time zone: UTC-8 (Pacific)
  - Summer (DST): UTC-7 (Pacific)
- ZIP codes: 97812, 97861
- Area code: 541
- FIPS code: 41-02800
- GNIS feature ID: 2409730
- Website: https://www.cityofarlingtonoregon.com/

Arlington is a city in Gilliam County, Oregon, United States. As of the 2020 census, Arlington had a population of 628.

== History ==
The account of how the city received its name varies; one tradition claims it was named after the lawyer Nathan Arlington Cornish, while another tradition claims that the Southern inhabitants of the city had enough clout to rename the city after Arlington, Virginia, home of general Robert E. Lee. Originally named Alkali, Arlington came into existence as a place for shipping cattle down the Columbia River. It was incorporated as Arlington by the Oregon Legislative Assembly on November 20, 1885.

The original townsite was demolished beginning in 1965 due to the scheduled inundation of Arlington by the rising waters of the Columbia River to form Lake Umatilla behind the John Day Dam. A new townsite was completed two years earlier.

In 2008, it was discovered that Mayor Carmen Kontur-Gronquist had posted photos of herself in lingerie online, which, along with several other issues, led to her recall from office.

== Geography ==
According to the United States Census Bureau, the city has a total area of 2.4 square miles (6.22 km^{2}), of which, 1.78 square miles (4.61 km^{2}) is land and 0.62 square miles (1.61 km^{2}) is water.

=== Climate ===
According to the Köppen Climate Classification system, Arlington has a semi-arid climate, abbreviated "BSk" on climate maps.

Climate data for Arlington, Oregon, 1991–2020 normals, extremes 1893–present
Month	Jan	Feb	Mar	Apr	May	Jun	Jul	Aug	Sep	Oct	Nov	Dec	Year
Record high °F (°C)	66 (19)	74 (23)	81 (27)	97 (36)	107 (42)	117 (47)	114 (46)	115 (46)	104 (40)	90 (32)	84 (29)	74 (23)	117 (47)
Mean maximum °F (°C)	56.2 (13.4)	59.4 (15.2)	67.8 (19.9)	79.3 (26.3)	90.2 (32.3)	96.4 (35.8)	103.4 (39.7)	102.1 (38.9)	93.8 (34.3)	79.9 (26.6)	65.4 (18.6)	56.7 (13.7)	104.8 (40.4)
Mean daily maximum °F (°C)	40.8 (4.9)	46.9 (8.3)	55.6 (13.1)	63.7 (17.6)	73.2 (22.9)	79.7 (26.5)	89.5 (31.9)	88.9 (31.6)	80.0 (26.7)	65.5 (18.6)	50.4 (10.2)	41.1 (5.1)	64.6 (18.1)
Daily mean °F (°C)	35.3 (1.8)	38.7 (3.7)	45.6 (7.6)	52.8 (11.6)	61.7 (16.5)	68.2 (20.1)	76.3 (24.6)	75.5 (24.2)	66.5 (19.2)	53.7 (12.1)	42.4 (5.8)	35.5 (1.9)	54.4 (12.4)
Mean daily minimum °F (°C)	29.7 (−1.3)	30.6 (−0.8)	35.7 (2.1)	42.0 (5.6)	50.1 (10.1)	56.6 (13.7)	63.2 (17.3)	62.0 (16.7)	53.1 (11.7)	42.0 (5.6)	34.4 (1.3)	29.9 (−1.2)	44.1 (6.7)
Mean minimum °F (°C)	15.4 (−9.2)	18.3 (−7.6)	24.8 (−4.0)	31.1 (−0.5)	37.0 (2.8)	46.2 (7.9)	52.6 (11.4)	51.0 (10.6)	40.9 (4.9)	28.4 (−2.0)	20.9 (−6.2)	16.7 (−8.5)	8.9 (−12.8)
Record low °F (°C)	−18 (−28)	−21 (−29)	7 (−14)	19 (−7)	26 (−3)	37 (3)	42 (6)	40 (4)	26 (−3)	11 (−12)	−5 (−21)	−12 (−24)	−21 (−29)
Average precipitation inches (mm)	1.47 (37)	0.98 (25)	0.83 (21)	0.61 (15)	0.75 (19)	0.48 (12)	0.10 (2.5)	0.15 (3.8)	0.33 (8.4)	0.81 (21)	1.13 (29)	1.66 (42)	9.30 (236)
Average snowfall inches (cm)	2.0 (5.1)	1.2 (3.0)	0.2 (0.51)	0.0 (0.0)	0.0 (0.0)	0.0 (0.0)	0.0 (0.0)	0.0 (0.0)	0.0 (0.0)	0.1 (0.25)	0.4 (1.0)	1.4 (3.6)	5.3 (13.46)
Average precipitation days (≥ 0.01 in)	11.2	8.1	8.5	6.1	6.5	3.5	1.0	1.7	2.5	6.8	9.7	11.4	77.0
Average snowy days (≥ 0.1 in)	1.7	1.4	0.2	0.0	0.0	0.0	0.0	0.0	0.0	0.0	0.3	1.8	5.4
Source 1: NOAA
Source 2: National Weather Service

== Demographics ==
Historical population
Census	Pop.	Note	%±
1890	356		—
1900	388		9.0%
1910	317		−18.3%
1920	529		66.9%
1930	601		13.6%
1940	609		1.3%
1950	686		12.6%
1960	643		−6.3%
1970	375		−41.7%
1980	521		38.9%
1990	425		−18.4%
2000	524		23.3%
2010	586		11.8%
2020	628		7.2%
U.S. Decennial Census

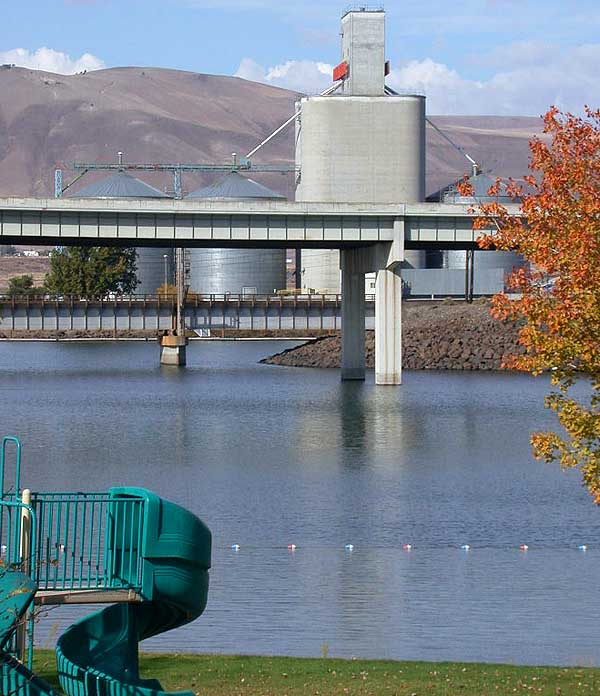
Park in Arlington, looking towards the Columbia River

=== 2020 census ===
As of the 2020 census, Arlington had a population of 628. The median age was 47.5 years; 20.2% of residents were under the age of 18 and 24.8% were 65 years of age or older. For every 100 females there were 102.6 males, and for every 100 females age 18 and over there were 100.4 males age 18 and over.

There were 259 households in Arlington, of which 30.9% had children under the age of 18 living in them. Of all households, 46.3% were married-couple households, 19.3% were households with a male householder and no spouse or partner present, and 27.8% were households with a female householder and no spouse or partner present. About 28.2% of all households were made up of individuals and 14.7% had someone living alone who was 65 years of age or older.

There were 294 housing units, of which 11.9% were vacant. Among occupied housing units, 67.6% were owner-occupied and 32.4% were renter-occupied. The homeowner vacancy rate was 2.2% and the rental vacancy rate was 19.0%.

0% of residents lived in urban areas, while 100.0% lived in rural areas.

Racial composition as of the 2020 census
Race	Number	Percent
White	524	83.4%
Black or African American	0	0%
American Indian and Alaska Native	18	2.9%
Asian	6	1.0%
Native Hawaiian and Other Pacific Islander	7	1.1%
Some other race	13	2.1%
Two or more races	60	9.6%
Hispanic or Latino (of any race)	48	7.6%

=== 2010 census ===
As of the census of 2010, there were 586 people, 256 households, and 149 families residing in the city. The population density was 329.2 inhabitants per square mile (127.1/km^{2}). There were 315 housing units at an average density of 177.0 per square mile (68.3/km^{2}). The racial makeup of the city was 93.2% White, 0.2% African American, 1.0% Native American, 0.2% Asian, 2.2% Pacific Islander, 2.6% from other races, and 0.7% from two or more races. Hispanic or Latino of any race were 6.7% of the population.

There were 256 households, of which 30.1% had children under the age of 18 living with them, 45.7% were married couples living together, 8.2% had a female householder with no husband present, 4.3% had a male householder with no wife present, and 41.8% were non-families. 32.0% of all households were made up of individuals, and 8.9% had someone living alone who was 65 years of age or older. The average household size was 2.29 and the average family size was 2.92.

The median age in the city was 43.6 years. 21.8% of residents were under the age of 18; 4.8% were between the ages of 18 and 24; 24.9% were from 25 to 44; 32.9% were from 45 to 64; and 15.5% were 65 years of age or older. The gender makeup of the city was 53.9% male and 46.1% female.

=== 2000 census ===
As of the census of 2000, there were 524 people, 223 households, and 144 families residing in the city. The population density was 295.2 inhabitants per square mile (114.0/km^{2}). There were 277 housing units at an average density of 156.0 per square mile (60.2/km^{2}). The racial makeup of the city was 95.42% White, 1.72% Native American, 1.72% from other races, and 1.15% from two or more races. Hispanic or Latino of any race were 3.24% of the population.

There were 223 households, out of which 31.4% had children under the age of 18 living with them, 53.8% were married couples living together, 7.2% had a female householder with no husband present, and 35.4% were non-families. 30.0% of all households were made up of individuals, and 8.5% had someone living alone who was 65 years of age or older. The average household size was 2.35 and the average family size was 2.96.

In the city, the population was spread out, with 26.5% under the age of 18, 5.9% from 18 to 24, 28.1% from 25 to 44, 25.4% from 45 to 64, and 14.1% who were 65 years of age or older. The median age was 38 years. For every 100 females, there were 102.3 males. For every 100 females age 18 and over, there were 93.5 males.

The median income for a household in the city was $35,714, and the median income for a family was $45,875. Males had a median income of $34,250 versus $21,161 for females. The per capita income for the city was $17,883. About 7.9% of families and 10.1% of the population were below the poverty line, including 15.6% of those under age 18 and 9.7% of those age 65 or over.

== Economy ==
The area around Arlington is largely agricultural farm land with wheat, barley and beef cattle being the principal products.

=== Waste disposal ===
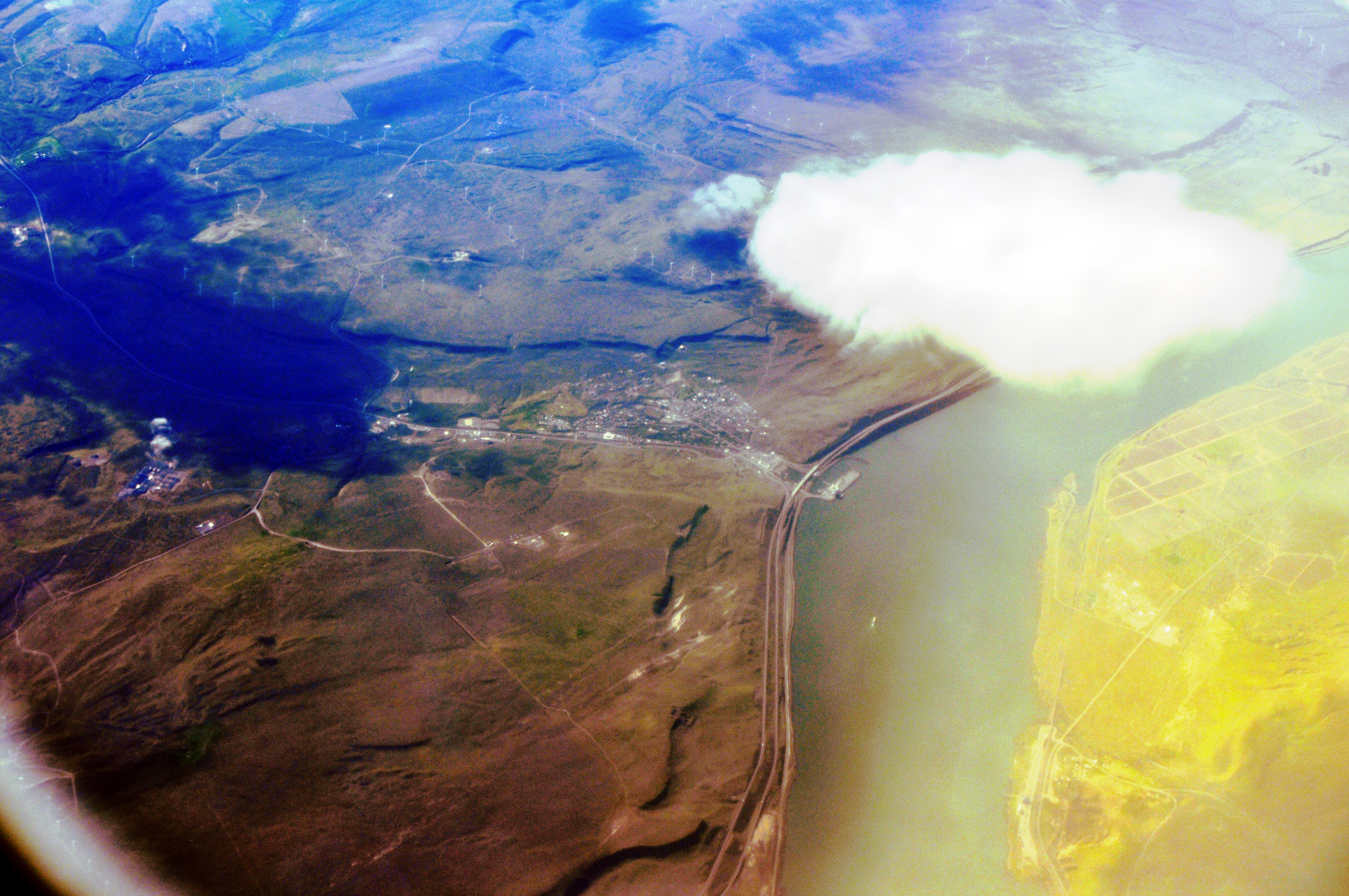
Aerial view of Arlington, 2015

Arlington is home to a sizable Waste Management landfill, notably receiving all of Seattle, Washington's trash and some from Portland, Oregon. In March 2010, Waste Management announced their plans to build a waste gasification plant next to their landfill that uses a plasma gasification technology that at the time was considered experimental. The plasma gasification plant was built in conjunction with the company, InEnTec, whose efforts to build such plants in California and elsewhere have met protest. The plant went into pilot operation in November 2011.

=== Wind farms ===
The area around Arlington is the location of several wind farms:

Station	Location	Capacity (MW)	Status	Notes	No. of turbines
Willow Creek Wind Farm	Gilliam County and Morrow County	72	Operational		48
Shepherds Flat Wind Farm	Gilliam County and Morrow County	845	Operational		338
Rattlesnake Road Wind Farm	Gilliam County	103	Operational		49
Leaning Juniper Wind Project	Gilliam County	302.3	Operational		200
Pebble Springs Wind Farm	Gilliam County	99	Operational		47
Wheatfield Wind Farm	Gilliam County	97	Operational		46
Montague Wind Power Facility	Gilliam County	Phase 1 - 201 (Proposed - 404)	Operational		Phase 1 - 56 112-269
Saddle Butte Wind - Four Mile Wind	Gilliam County and Morrow County	399	Proposed		133
2Morrow Energy	Gilliam County and Morrow County	900	Proposed		

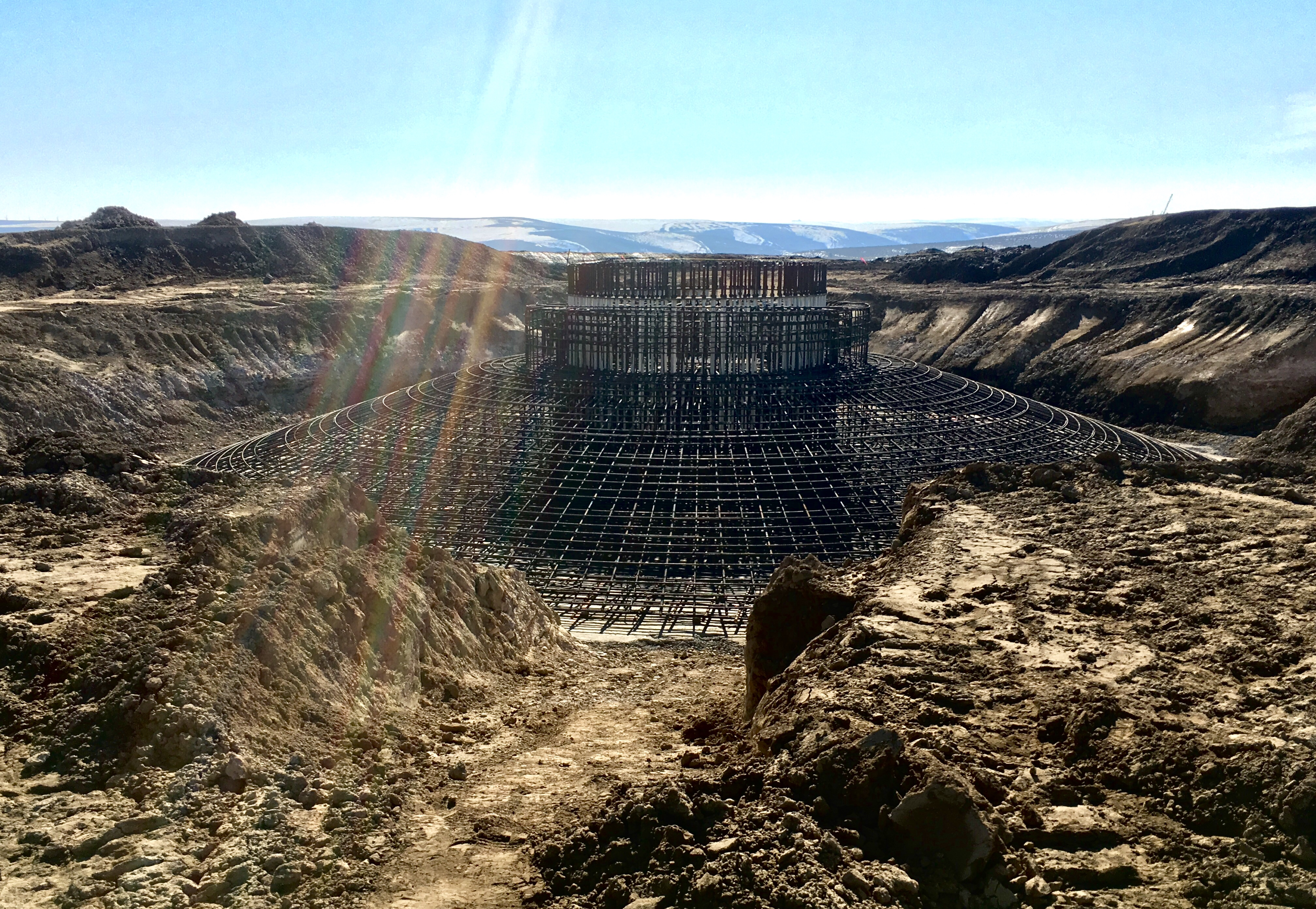
Montague Wind Project under construction.

Caithness Energy has the Shepherds Flat Wind Farm, one of the largest land-based wind farms in the world. Approved in 2008 by state regulators, groundbreaking came in 2009. It officially opened in September 2012 and "reached full commercial operations in November 2012." There have been some controversies around the project that emerged in 2009 and 2010.

In fall 2017, construction was started on the Montague Wind Power Project, a project owned and operated by Avangrid Renewables to provide power to Apple Inc.'s Prineville Data Center through Oregon's Direct Access Program. "Apple says Montague will provide it 560,000 megawatt-hours of electricity annually."

Along with the wind farm there have been several proposed solar farms. On April 20, 2020, Avangrid requested to change the boundary and site layout of its Montague Wind Power Facility. This request was to split "the existing site certificate into three new site certificates for facilities to be named Montague Wind, Montague Solar, and Oregon Trail Solar; and, transfer of site certificates for Montague Solar and Oregon Trail Solar to new limited liability companies, Montague Solar, LLC and Oregon Trail Solar, LLC, wholly owned subsidiaries of the current certificate holder owner, Avangrid Renewables, LLC."

== Transportation ==
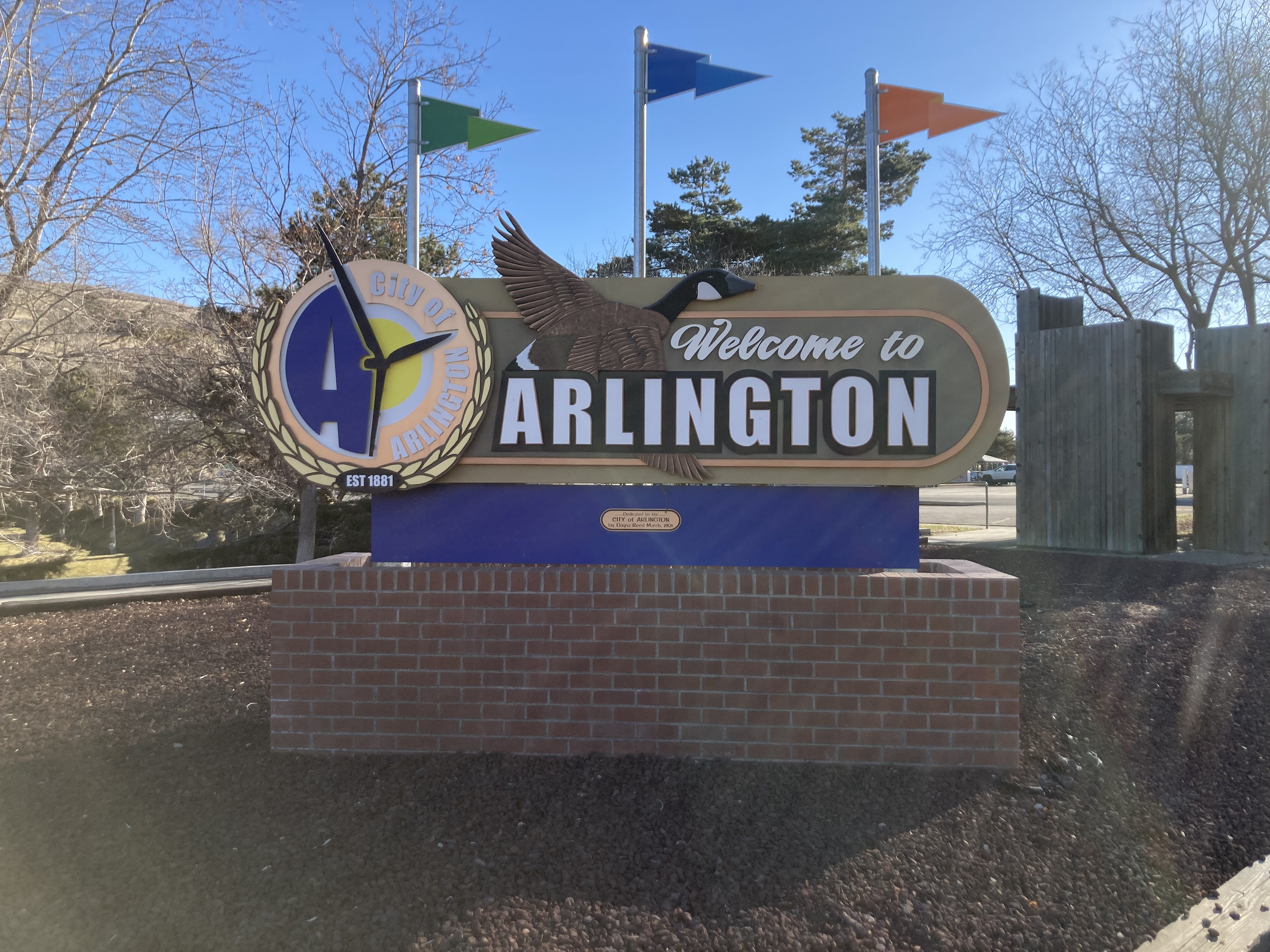
Welcome sign

Arlington is located at the intersection of Interstate 84 and Oregon Route 19. I-84 travels west towards Portland and east towards Boise, Idaho; OR 19 connects Arlington to Condon and U.S. Route 26 near Dayville.

The Port of Arlington offers access the Columbia River water way and hosts

1. a marina with a water depth of 24 feet that features a fuel dock and 8 transient moorage slips, 1 side tie dock, 11-30’ slips, and 7-20’ slips;
2. Mid Columbia Producer, LLC River Terminal; and
3. a windsurfing and kiteboarding launch.

The city has a small airport named Arlington Municipal Airport, located on a nearby plateau. In 2011, the U.S. Air Force proposed Arlington as the site of a future United States Department of Defense unmanned aerial vehicle base.

== Notable people ==
- Doc Severinsen, jazz musician and big band leader

== Public services ==
- Arlington Health Clinic
- North Gilliam Medic
- North Gilliam Rural Fire Protection District
- Gilliam County Sheriff's Office

== Churches ==
- Arlington United Methodist Church
- Arlington Church of the Nazarene
- St. Francis Catholic Church

== See also ==
- Arlington High School
