= Eightmile, Oregon =

Unincorporated community in Morrow County, Oregon, United States

- Unincorporated community
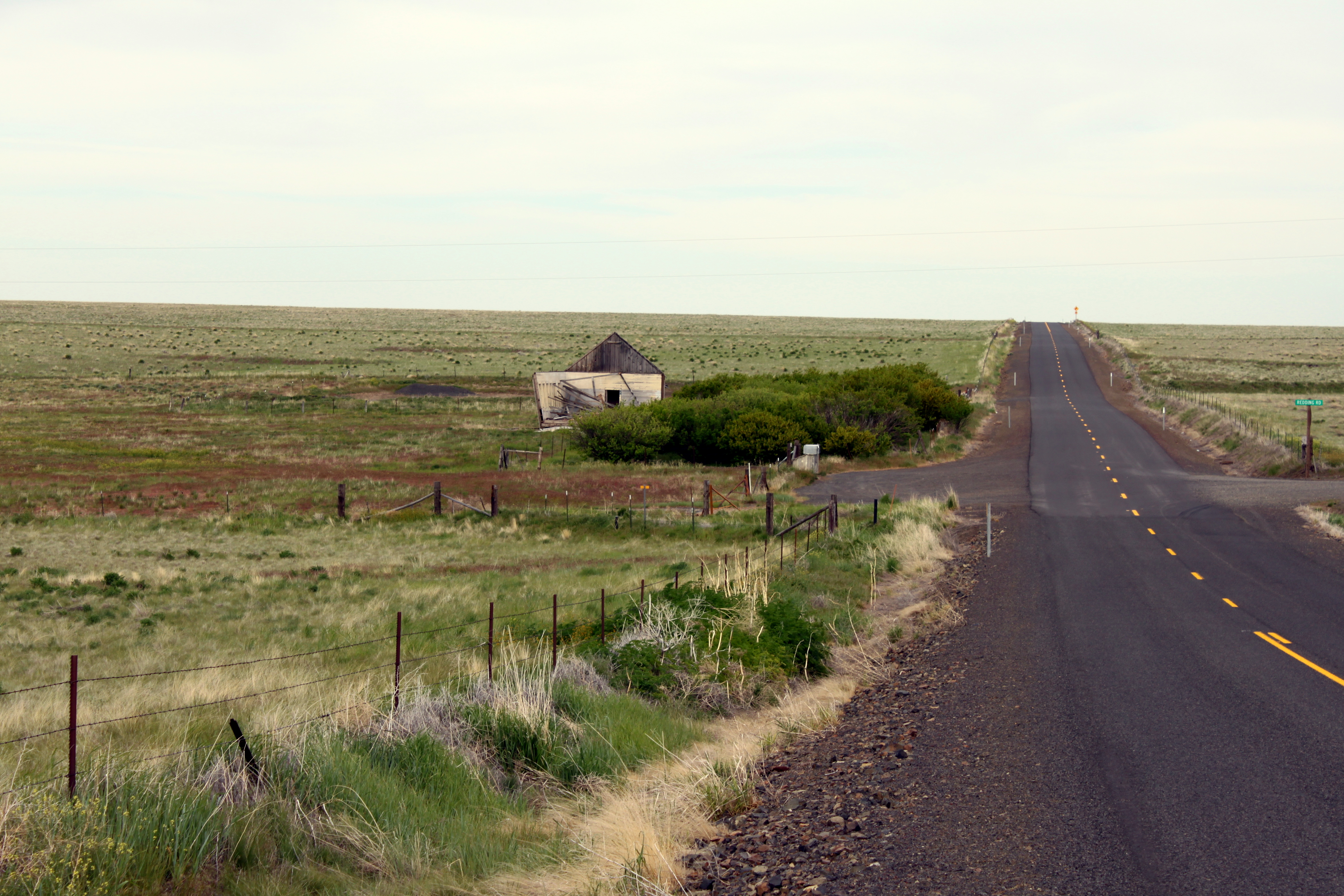
- Abandoned building on Oregon Route 206 in Eightmile

- Location within the state of Oregon Eightmile (the United States)
- Coordinates: 45°15′19″N 119°48′58″W
- Country: United States
- State: Oregon
- County: Morrow
- Elevation: 2,720 ft (830 m)
- Time zone: UTC-8 (Pacific)
  - Summer (DST): UTC-7 (Pacific)
- Area code: 541
- GNIS feature ID: 1136248

Eightmile is an unincorporated community in Morrow County, Oregon, United States, on Oregon Route 206 (the Wasco–Heppner Highway).

== Description ==
The town was named by pioneer ranchers after its location on Eightmile Canyon, which was so named because its mouth was about 8 miles (13 km) up Willow Creek from the Columbia River. Eightmile's post office was established in 1883 and closed in 1941.
