= Condon, Oregon =

- City
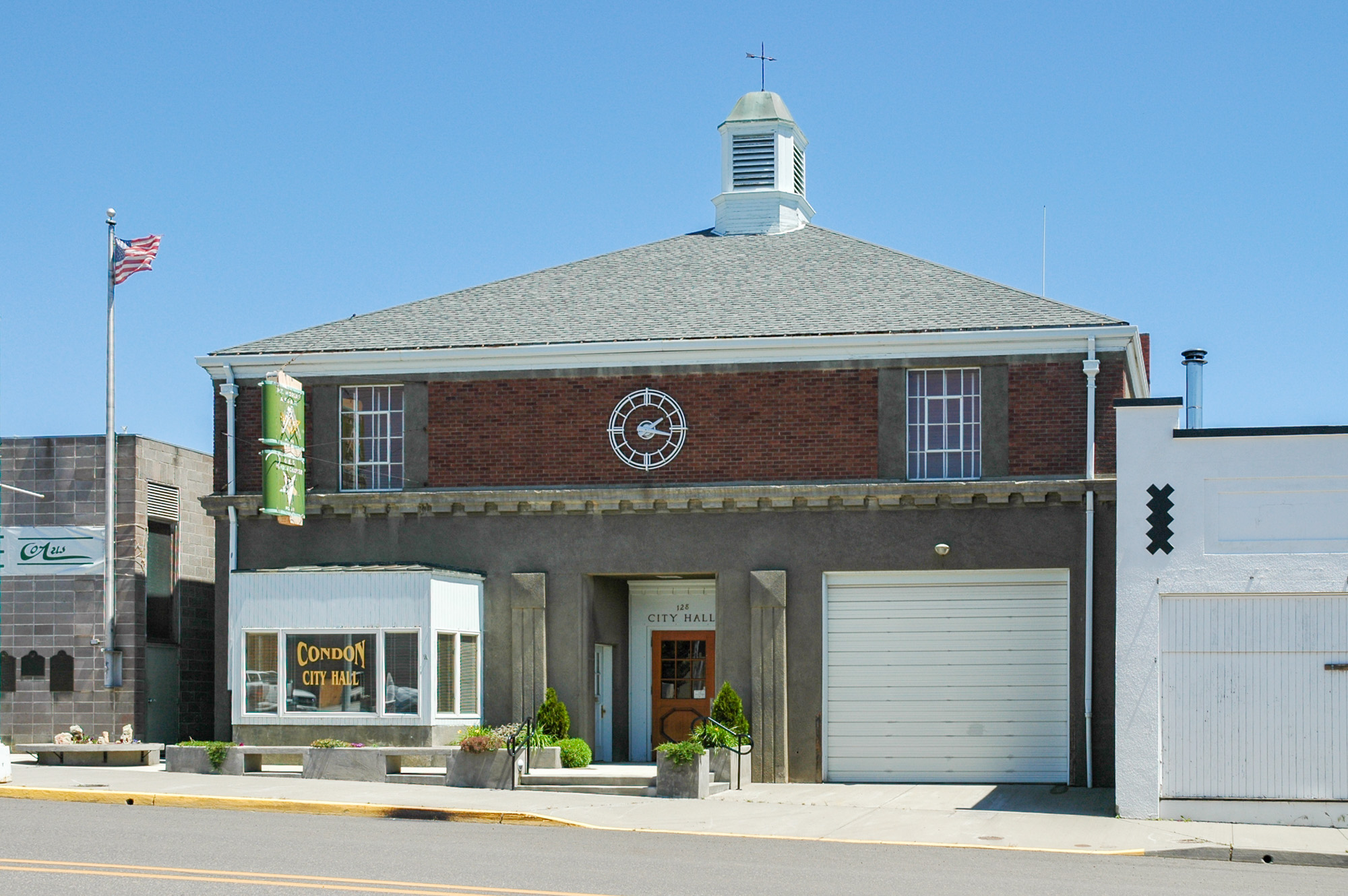
- Condon City Hall

- Location in Oregon
- Coordinates: 45°14′12″N 120°11′09″W
- Country: United States
- State: Oregon
- County: Gilliam
- Incorporated: 1893

Government
  - Mayor: Vacant

Area
  - Total: 0.81 sq mi (2.11 km^{2})
  - Land: 0.81 sq mi (2.11 km^{2})
  - Water: 0 sq mi (0.00 km^{2})
- Elevation: 2,848 ft (868 m)

Population (2020)
  - Total: 711
  - Density: 872.7/sq mi (336.94/km^{2})
- Time zone: UTC−8 (Pacific)
  - Summer (DST): UTC−7 (Pacific)
- ZIP code: 97823
- Area codes: 458 and 541
- FIPS code: 41-15000
- GNIS feature ID: 2410215
- Website: www.cityofcondon.com
- Condon Commercial Historic District
- U.S. National Register of Historic Places
- U.S. Historic district
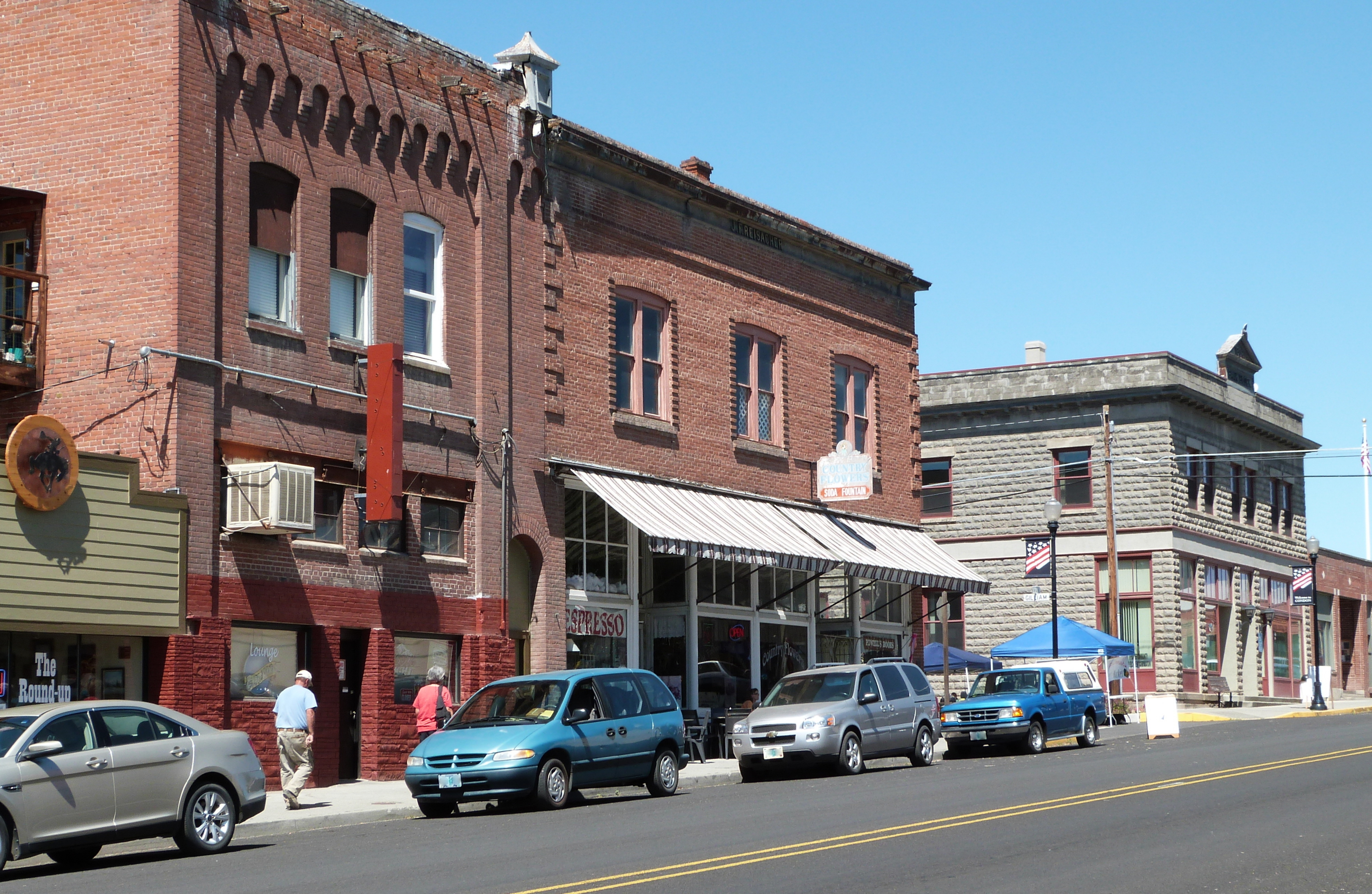
- The IOOF Hall, J.F. Reisacher Building, and Bank Block (left to right) in 2012.
- Location: Downtown Condon, Oregon
- Area: 9.95 acres (4.03 ha)
- NRHP reference No.: 98000609 (original); 01000493 (increase)

Significant dates
- Added to NRHP: May 29, 1998
- Boundary increase: May 16, 2001

Condon is a city in and the county seat of Gilliam County, in the U.S. state of Oregon. As of the 2020 census, Condon had a population of 711. The city, with an historic main street along Oregon Route 19, is a farming and ranching community. The John Day River/Cottonwood Canyon State Park, the ghost town of Lonerock and the John Day Fossil Beds are all a short drive from Historic Condon.

== History ==
Condon was the southern terminus of the Condon Branch of the Union Pacific Railroad. In 1883, a local homesteader named Potter platted the land around a spring on his property. The spring, which emerged from a bed of black basalt, was known to pioneer ranchers in the area as Summit Springs. Experiencing financial difficulty, Potter surrendered the site to the legal firm Condon and Cornish from Arlington. Harvey C. Condon, a member of the firm, was a nephew of Oregon geologist Thomas Condon. Condon and Cornish sold lots in the townsite and in 1884, resident David B. Trimble applied for a post office and became its first postmaster. He named the post office Condon after Harvey C. Condon.

Condon Air Force Station was a radar station near the city that operated from 1951 to 1970.

=== Condon Commercial Historic District ===
In 1998, Condon's historic downtown core along Main Street was listed on the National Register of Historic Places as the Condon Commercial Historic District. The City of Condon has collaborated with business interests to restore buildings on Main Street. Most of the buildings on the Historic Main Street have been restored, new businesses have opened, and the Gilliam County Library moved to the remodeled Hollen and Sons Hardware Store, the City Park has been re-designed into an event space.

== Geography and climate ==
Condon, in Gilliam County in north-central Oregon, is at the intersection of Oregon Route 19, running north–south through the city, and Oregon Route 206, which runs east–west at Condon. By highway, the city is 38 miles (61 km) south of Interstate 84 at Arlington, 69 miles (111 km) southeast of The Dalles, and 150 miles (240 km) east of Portland.

The city is 2,831 feet (863 m) above sea level. According to the United States Census Bureau, the city has a total area of 0.83 square miles (2.15 km^{2}), all of it land.

Condon has a borderline Mediterranean (Köppen Csb)/Continental Mediterranean (Dsb) climate, characterized by dry summers with cool mornings giving way to very warm afternoons, and cold though not usually severe winters. In some cases, very cold continental air from Canada will be driven into the Columbia Gorge, producing an average of two mornings at or below 0 °F or −17.8 °C each winter. The coldest month has been January 1930 with 22 afternoons in succession not topping freezing, an average temperature of 12.7 °F or −10.7 °C and an average minimum of 4.9 °F or −15.1 °C. On the other hand, sixteen afternoons during the three-month winter typically top 50 °F or 10 °C.

Most of the limited precipitation falls during this period as a mixture of snow and rain. When maritime air interacts with a cold outbreak substantial snow can occur, with maximum monthly totals of 44.6 inches (1.13 m) in December 2008 and 43.1 inches (1.09 m) in January 1950; however, only a trace of snow fell between July 1963 and June 1964. Very powerful Pacific Northwest rainstorms – although depleted of most moisture by the Cascades – provide the heaviest precipitation: the wettest month has been December 1981 with 5.02 inches (127.5 mm) and the wettest "rain year" from July 1947 to June 1948 with 20.77 inches (527.6 mm). The driest "rain year" was from July 1938 to June 1939 with only 6.77 inches (172.0 mm).

Apart from occasional thunderstorms, the summers are very dry. When hot winds from the interior reach the Pacific Northwest, very hot "heatwave" conditions can occur. During a typical summer, 90 °F or 32.2 °C will be reached on sixteen afternoons, although 100 °F or 37.8 °C is extremely rare, occurring at all only in eight summers between 1981 and 2010 and never more than twice. The hottest afternoon was on July 24, 1928 – during an exception heatwave of seven century afternoons – which reached 111 °F or 43.9 °C.

Climate data for Condon, Oregon, 1991–2020 normals, extremes 1894–2018
Month	Jan	Feb	Mar	Apr	May	Jun	Jul	Aug	Sep	Oct	Nov	Dec	Year
Record high °F (°C)	71 (22)	71 (22)	78 (26)	91 (33)	97 (36)	104 (40)	111 (44)	103 (39)	99 (37)	88 (31)	74 (23)	69 (21)	111 (44)
Mean maximum °F (°C)	55.6 (13.1)	58.7 (14.8)	65.0 (18.3)	74.1 (23.4)	83.4 (28.6)	88.7 (31.5)	94.8 (34.9)	94.8 (34.9)	88.8 (31.6)	78.5 (25.8)	64.1 (17.8)	55.0 (12.8)	96.5 (35.8)
Mean daily maximum °F (°C)	40.2 (4.6)	44.2 (6.8)	51.5 (10.8)	57.9 (14.4)	66.7 (19.3)	73.4 (23.0)	84.1 (28.9)	83.9 (28.8)	75.0 (23.9)	61.2 (16.2)	48.0 (8.9)	39.0 (3.9)	60.4 (15.8)
Daily mean °F (°C)	33.0 (0.6)	35.7 (2.1)	41.3 (5.2)	46.3 (7.9)	54.2 (12.3)	60.0 (15.6)	68.3 (20.2)	68.1 (20.1)	60.5 (15.8)	49.3 (9.6)	39.3 (4.1)	32.1 (0.1)	49.0 (9.5)
Mean daily minimum °F (°C)	25.8 (−3.4)	27.1 (−2.7)	31.1 (−0.5)	34.7 (1.5)	41.7 (5.4)	46.6 (8.1)	52.6 (11.4)	52.3 (11.3)	46.1 (7.8)	37.3 (2.9)	30.7 (−0.7)	25.1 (−3.8)	37.6 (3.1)
Mean minimum °F (°C)	9.5 (−12.5)	10.5 (−11.9)	20.1 (−6.6)	23.3 (−4.8)	27.4 (−2.6)	34.2 (1.2)	40.1 (4.5)	40.0 (4.4)	32.0 (0.0)	23.2 (−4.9)	15.3 (−9.3)	6.9 (−13.9)	−1.0 (−18.3)
Record low °F (°C)	−24 (−31)	−20 (−29)	2 (−17)	14 (−10)	15 (−9)	23 (−5)	29 (−2)	30 (−1)	20 (−7)	3 (−16)	−14 (−26)	−23 (−31)	−24 (−31)
Average precipitation inches (mm)	1.81 (46)	1.26 (32)	1.20 (30)	1.30 (33)	1.65 (42)	1.11 (28)	0.39 (9.9)	0.38 (9.7)	0.47 (12)	1.17 (30)	1.51 (38)	1.82 (46)	14.07 (356.6)
Average snowfall inches (cm)	5.6 (14)	4.7 (12)	2.0 (5.1)	1.0 (2.5)	0.0 (0.0)	0.0 (0.0)	0.0 (0.0)	0.0 (0.0)	0.0 (0.0)	0.2 (0.51)	1.7 (4.3)	10.3 (26)	25.5 (64.41)
Average precipitation days (≥ 0.01 in)	11.2	10.8	12.1	10.9	9.7	6.7	2.6	3.0	3.9	8.2	11.8	11.7	102.6
Average snowy days (≥ 0.1 in)	4.4	3.1	2.0	0.5	0.0	0.0	0.0	0.0	0.0	0.2	1.6	4.8	16.6
Source 1: NOAA
Source 2: National Weather Service (mean maxima/minima 1981–2010)

== Demographics ==
Historical population
Census	Pop.	Note	%±
1890	60		—
1900	230		283.3%
1910	1,009		338.7%
1920	1,127		11.7%
1930	940		−16.6%
1940	856		−8.9%
1950	968		13.1%
1960	1,149		18.7%
1970	973		−15.3%
1980	783		−19.5%
1990	635		−18.9%
2000	759		19.5%
2010	682		−10.1%
2020	711		4.3%

=== 2020 census ===
As of the 2020 census, Condon had a population of 711. The median age was 55.9 years. 18.1% of residents were under the age of 18 and 33.3% of residents were 65 years of age or older. For every 100 females there were 92.7 males, and for every 100 females age 18 and over there were 88.3 males age 18 and over.

0% of residents lived in urban areas, while 100.0% lived in rural areas.

There were 338 households in Condon, of which 26.6% had children under the age of 18 living in them. Of all households, 44.1% were married-couple households, 20.4% were households with a male householder and no spouse or partner present, and 31.1% were households with a female householder and no spouse or partner present. About 36.7% of all households were made up of individuals and 20.4% had someone living alone who was 65 years of age or older.

There were 406 housing units, of which 16.7% were vacant. Among occupied housing units, 73.4% were owner-occupied and 26.6% were renter-occupied. The homeowner vacancy rate was 1.1% and the rental vacancy rate was 3.2%.

Racial composition as of the 2020 census
Race	Number	Percent
White	640	90.0%
Black or African American	3	0.4%
American Indian and Alaska Native	4	0.6%
Asian	2	0.3%
Native Hawaiian and Other Pacific Islander	1	0.1%
Some other race	11	1.5%
Two or more races	50	7.0%
Hispanic or Latino (of any race)	38	5.3%

=== 2010 census ===
As of the census of 2010, there were 682 people, 357 households, and 184 families residing in the city. The population density was 821.7 inhabitants per square mile (317.3/km^{2}). There were 455 housing units at an average density of 548.2 per square mile (211.7/km^{2}). The racial makeup of the city was 97.2% White, 0.1% African American, 0.9% Native American, 0.1% Asian, 0.9% from other races, and 0.7% from two or more races. Hispanic or Latino of any race were 2.1% of the population.

There were 357 households, of which 16.2% had children under the age of 18 living with them, 42.3% were married couples living together, 5.6% had a female householder with no husband present, 3.6% had a male householder with no wife present, and 48.5% were not families. 45.9% of all households were made up of individuals, and 24.9% had someone living alone who was 65 years of age or older. The average household size was 1.85 and the average family size was 2.54.

The median age in the city was 54.5 years. 14.7% of residents were under the age of 18; 3.7% were between the ages of 18 and 24; 15.4% were from 25 to 44; 34.7% were from 45 to 64; and 31.7% were 65 years of age or older. The gender makeup of the city was 46.6% male and 53.4% female.

=== 2000 census ===
As of the census of 2000, there were 759 people, 343 households, and 215 families residing in the city. The population density was 887.3 inhabitants per square mile (342.6/km^{2}). There were 413 housing units at an average density of 482.8 per square mile (186.4/km^{2}). The racial makeup of the city was 97.50% White, 0.40% African American, 0.79% Native American, 0.26% Asian, 0.13% from other races, and 0.92% from two or more races. Hispanic or Latino of any race were 0.53% of the population.

There were 343 households, out of which 22.2% had children under the age of 18 living with them, 53.9% were married couples living together, 6.7% had a female householder with no husband present, and 37.3% were non-families. 34.4% of all households were made up of individuals, and 17.8% had someone living alone who was 65 years of age or older. The average household size was 2.14 and the average family size was 2.72.

In the city, the population was spread out, with 19.6% under the age of 18, 4.0% from 18 to 24, 21.9% from 25 to 44, 26.6% from 45 to 64, and 27.9% who were 65 years of age or older. The median age was 48 years. For every 100 females, there were 95.1 males. For every 100 females age 18 and over, there were 88.3 males.

The median income for a household in the city was $32,667, and the median income for a family was $40,000. Males had a median income of $30,500 versus $21,042 for females. The per capita income for the city was $18,481. About 3.6% of families and 5.4% of the population were below the poverty line, including 5.1% of those under age 18 and 5.1% of those age 65 or over.

== Arts and culture ==
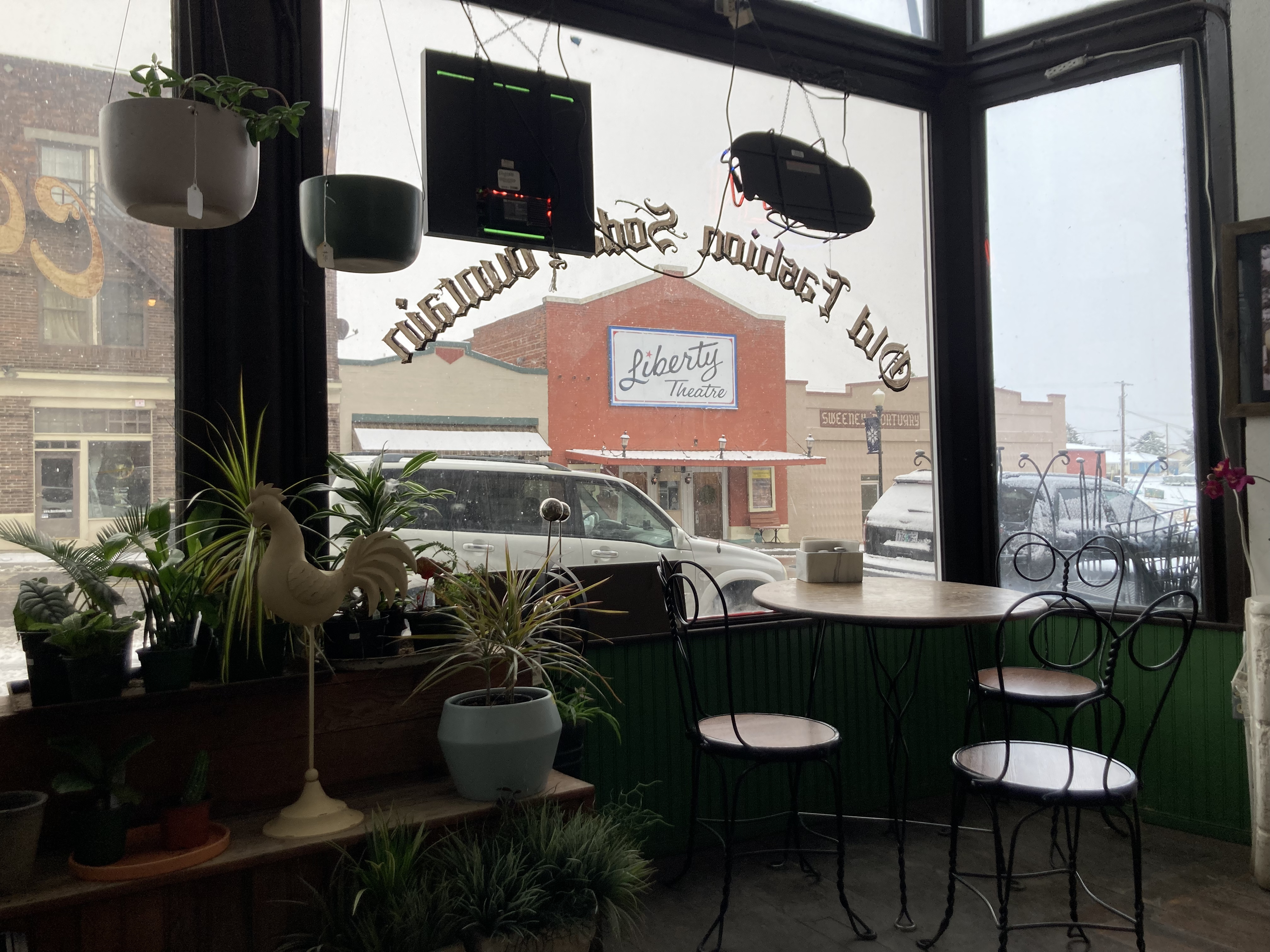
Liberty Theatre from the Condon Local

Condon hosts special events throughout the year including Robert Burns Day in January, the Tumbleweed Basketball Tournament in March, the Fabulous 4 July, and the Fall Festival in November.

The Gilliam County Historical Museum complex at Burns Park along Route 19 includes several restored buildings, including a train depot, caboose, church, barber shop, jail, school house, and the Silas A. Rice Log House, which is listed on the National Register of Historic Places.

Condon is also a haven for local artists with periodic art shows occurring in the community.

Condon has a 9-hole golf course and swimming pool operated by the City of Condon. A movie theater that was recently purchased by the Condon Arts Council and will be restored into an event space. The Oregon Frontier Chamber of Commerce hosts a Summer Concert series in the City Park and upper Main Street. There is also a game-bird reserve, recreational ranches, and hunting lodges nearby.

== Education and economy ==
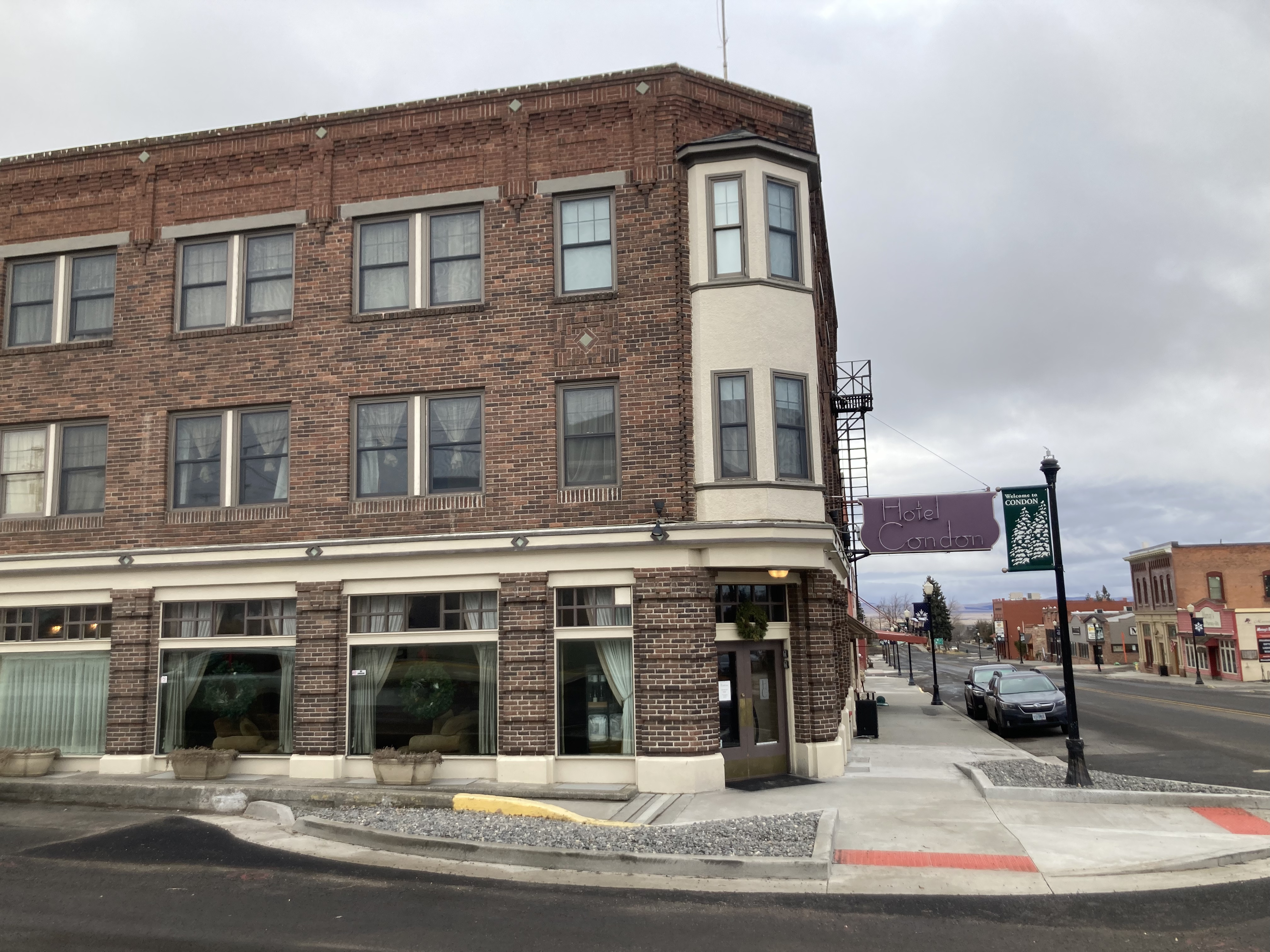
Hotel Condon

Condon students are served by the Condon School District 25J, which includes Condon Elementary School and Condon High School.

The five largest employers in Condon as of 2002 were the Gilliam County government, the Condon School District, the North-Central Education Service District, the Hotel Condon, and Summit Springs Village, an assisted living center.

== Media ==
The Times-Journal is a weekly newspaper published in Condon.

== Transportation ==
The state airport in Condon is named Pauling Field after former resident Linus Pauling, and sits at the north end of town.

== Notable people ==
- Jay Bowerman, 13th governor of Oregon
- John Burns, Oregon Senate President from 1971 to 1973
- Robert R. Butler, U.S. representative from Oregon
- Terry Cooney, Major League Baseball umpire
- Ernest R. Fatland, Oregon State Representative and Senator, Speaker of the Oregon House, 1939
- William Parry Murphy, Nobel laureate (1934 Medicine)
- Linus Pauling, Nobel laureate (1954 Chemistry and 1962 Peace)
- Earl Snell, 23rd governor of Oregon
- Staryl C. Austin, US Air Force Brigadier General
