= National Register of Historic Places listings in Morrow County, Oregon =

Location of Morrow County in Oregon

This list presents the full set of buildings, structures, objects, sites, or districts designated on the National Register of Historic Places in Morrow County, Oregon, United States, and offers brief descriptive information about each of them. The National Register recognizes places of national, state, or local historic significance across the United States. Out of over 90,000 National Register sites nationwide, Oregon is home to over 2,000, and 5 of those are found in Morrow County.

This National Park Service list is complete through NPS recent listings posted March 21, 2025.

== Current listings ==
	Name on the Register	Image	Date listed	Location	City or town	Description
1	Gilliam and Bisbee Building	Gilliam and Bisbee Building	June 1, 1990 (#90000840)	Southeast corner of Main and May Sts. 45°21′12″N 119°33′12″W	Heppner	
2	Hardman IOOF Lodge Hall	Hardman IOOF Lodge Hall	August 7, 2012 (#12000484)	51186 Oregon Route 207 (Heppner–Spray Highway); 45°10′10″N 119°40′58″W	Hardman	also known as the Hardman Community Center
3	Heppner Hotel	Heppner Hotel	October 29, 1982 (#82001511)	124 N. Main St. 45°21′16″N 119°33′11″W	Heppner	Now is the Heppner Senior Center
4	Morrow County Courthouse	Morrow County Courthouse	February 28, 1985 (#85000366)	100 Court St. 45°21′12″N 119°33′01″W	Heppner	
5	Oregon Trail, Wells Springs Segment	Oregon Trail, Wells Springs Segment	September 13, 1978 (#78002305)	South of Boardman within the Naval Weapons Systems Training Facility Boardman; 45°38′30″N 119°41′13″W	Boardman	

== See also ==
- National Register of Historic Places listings in Oregon
- Listings in neighboring counties: Benton, Gilliam, Grant, Klickitat, Umatilla, Wheeler
- Historic preservation
- History of Oregon
- Lists of Oregon-related topics
