= List of power stations in Oregon =

Sources of Oregon utility-scale electricity generation in gigawatt-hours, full-year 2025:
1. Hydroelectric: 29,152 (45.1%)
2. Natural gas: 22,183 (34.3%)
3. Wind: 9,466 (14.6%)
4. Solar: 2,684 (4.15%)
5. Biomass: 1,023 (1.58%)
6. Geothermal: 182 (0.28%)

This is a list of electricity-generating power stations in the U.S. state of Oregon, sorted by type and name. In 2024, Oregon had a total summer capacity of 17.7 GW through all of its power plants, and a net generation of 64,661 GWh. In 2025, the electrical energy generation mix was 45.1% hydroelectric, 34.3% natural gas, 14.6% wind, 4.2% solar, 1.6% biomass, and 0.3% geothermal. Small-scale solar, including customer-owned photovoltaic panels, delivered an additional net 733 GWh to the state's electrical grid in 2025. This compares as less than one-third of the amount generated by Oregon's utility-scale photovoltaic plants.

During 2019, Oregon was one of the top five U.S. states in its share of renewable electricity generation. It was the second largest generator of hydroelectric power after the state of Washington. Oregon ranks third in the nation behind California and Nevada for its geothermal generation potential.

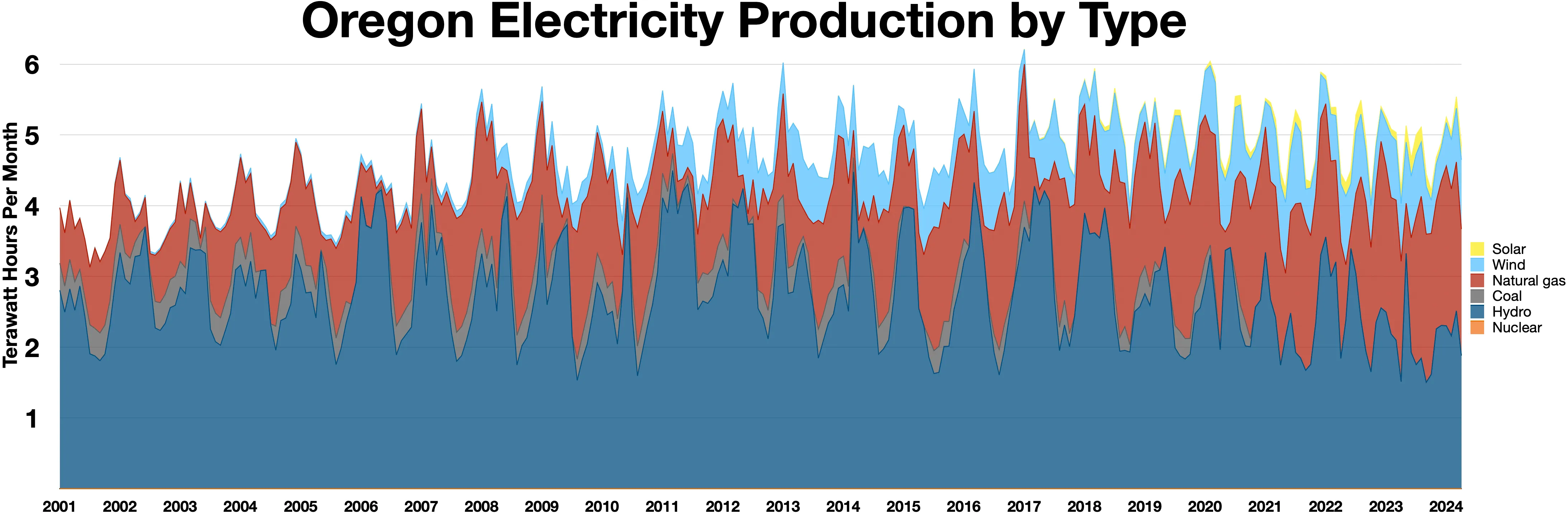
Oregon electricity production by type

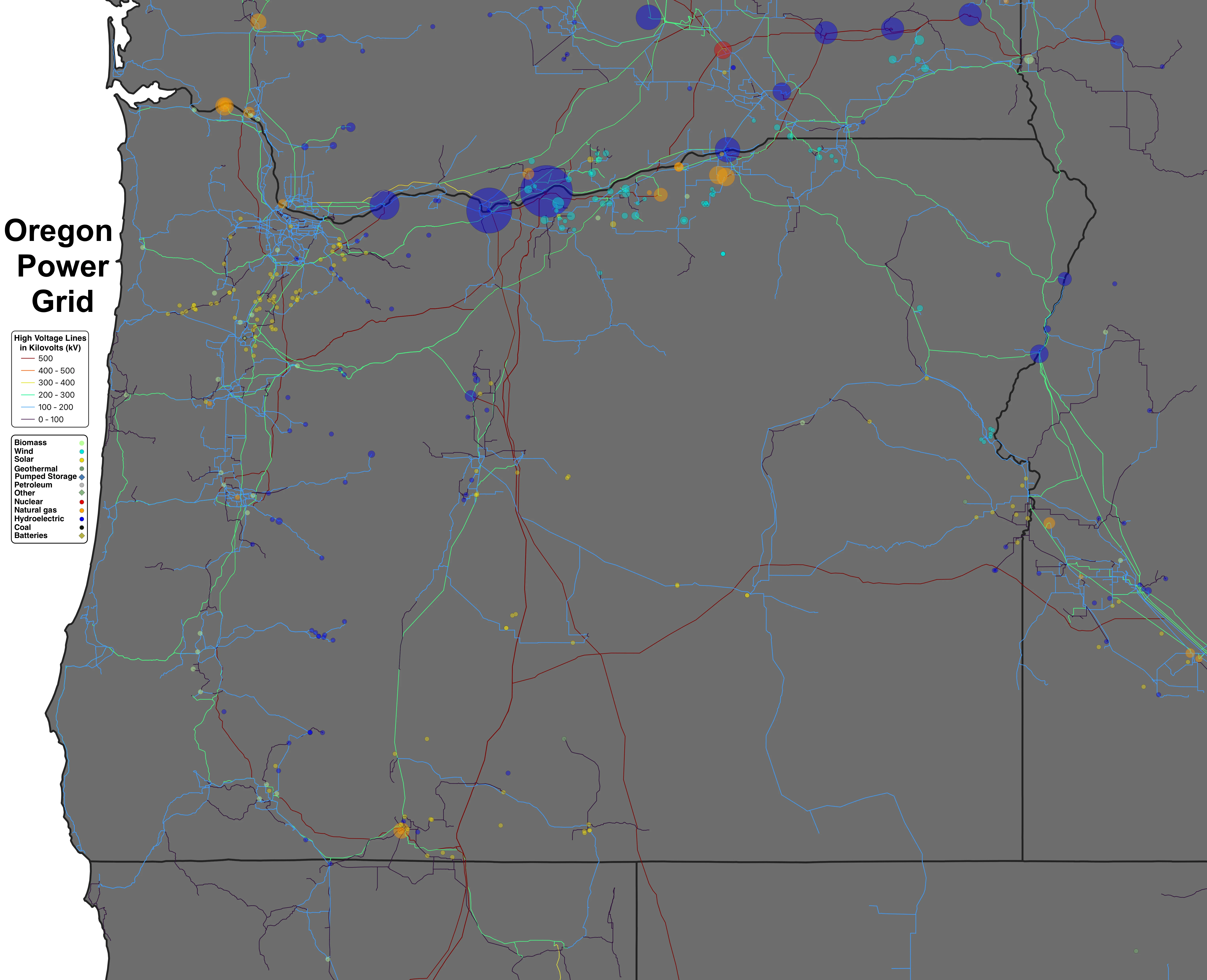
Oregon power grid

== Nuclear power stations ==
The Trojan Nuclear Power Plant generated 1,095 MW of electricity during the years 1976 to 1992. Decommissioning and removal of the nuclear components was completed in 2006. Oregon had no utility-scale plants that used fissile material as a fuel in 2019.

== Fossil-fuel power stations ==
Data from the U.S. Energy Information Administration serves as a general reference.

=== Natural gas ===
| Name | Location | Coordinates | Capacity (MW) | Type | Operator | Year opened | Ref |
|---|---|---|---|---|---|---|---|
| Hermiston | Hermiston | 45°48′15″N 119°22′12″W | 474 | 1x1 combined cycle (x2), 2x1 combined cycle | PacifiCorp (50%) | 1996 | |
| Klamath Cogeneration | Klamath Falls | 42°10′26″N 121°48′38″W | 606 | 2x1 combined cycle, simple cycle (x4) | Iberdrola Renovables | 2001 | |
| Beaver | Clatskanie | 46°10′21″N 123°10′26″W | 529 | 6x1 combined cycle, simple cycle | Portland General Electric | 1974 | |
| Port Westward | Clatskanie | 46°10′44″N 123°10′19″W | 413 | 1x1 combined cycle | Portland General Electric | 2007 | |
| Port Westward 2 | Clatskanie | 46°10′44″N 123°10′19″W | 225 | Reciprocating engine (x12) | Portland General Electric | 2015 | |
| Coyote Springs | Boardman | 45°50′53″N 119°40′26″W | 233 | 1x1 combined cycle | Portland General Electric | 1995 | |
| Coyote Springs 2 | Boardman | 45°50′53″N 119°34′26″W | 290 | 1x1 combined cycle | Avista | 2003 | |
| Carty Generating Plant | Boardman | 45°41′55″N 119°48′47″W | 416 | 1x1 combined cycle | Portland General Electric | 2016 | |

== Renewable power stations ==
Data from the U.S. Energy Information Administration serves as a general reference.

See also the Oregon Department of Energy's Renewable Energy Resources page.

=== Hydroelectric ===
| Name | Location | Coordinates | Capacity (MW) | Operator | Year opened | Ref |
|---|---|---|---|---|---|---|
| John Day Dam | Columbia River (also WA) | 45°42′59″N 120°41′39″W | 2,160 | United States Army Corps of Engineers | 1971 | |
| The Dalles Dam | Columbia River (also WA) | 45°36′50″N 121°08′05″W | 2,100 | United States Army Corps of Engineers | 1957 | |
| Bonneville Dam | Columbia River (also WA) | 45°38′39″N 121°56′28″W | 1,218 | United States Army Corps of Engineers | 1937 | |
| McNary Dam | Columbia River (also WA) | 45°56′25″N 119°17′56″W | 980 | United States Army Corps of Engineers | 1954 | |
| Brownlee Dam | Snake River | 44°50′12″N 116°53′51″W | 585 | Idaho Power Company | 1958 | |
| Hells Canyon Dam | Snake River (also ID) | 45°14′38″N 116°42′03″W | 391 | Idaho Power Company | 1967 | |
| Round Butte Dam | Deschutes River | 44°36′21″N 121°16′38″W | 225 | Portland General Electric | 1964 | |
| North Umpqua River System | Umpqua River | 43°19′21″N 122°11′40″W | 200 | PacifiCorp | 1950 to 1956 | |
| Oxbow power station | Snake River (also ID) | 44°58′18″N 116°50′06″W | 190 | Idaho Power Company | 1961 | |
| Link River Dam | Link River | 42°14′02″N 121°48′07″W | 151 | PacifiCorp | 1921 | |
| Lookout Point Dam | Middle Fork Willamette River | 43°54′55″N 122°45′11″W | 120 | United States Army Corps of Engineers | 1953 | |
| Detroit Dam | North Santiam River | 44°43′21″N 122°15′04″W | 100 | United States Army Corps of Engineers | 1953 | |
| Green Peter Dam | Middle Santiam River | 44°26′58″N 122°32′58″W | 80 | United States Army Corps of Engineers | 1967 | |
| Pelton Dam | Deschutes River | 44°41′40″N 121°13′53″W | 73 | Portland General Electric | 1958 | |
| North Fork | Clackamas River | 45°14′36″N 122°16′48″W | 58 | Portland General Electric | 1958 | |
| Prospect Hydroelectric System | Rogue River | 42°43′52″N 122°30′50″W | 52 | PacifiCorp | 1912=1957 | |
| Lost Creek Dam | Rogue River | 42°40′18″N 122°40′38″W | 49 | United States Army Corps of Engineers | 1977 | |
| Faraday | Clackamas River | 45°16′05″N 122°19′12″W | 46 | Portland General Electric | 1907 | |
| T. W. Sullivan | Willamette River | 45°21′14″N 122°37′08″W | 46 | Portland General Electric | 1895 | |
| Oak Grove Hydroelectric Project | Clackamas River | 45°07′19″N 122°04′12″W | 44 | Portland General Electric | 1924 | |
| Hills Creek Dam | Middle Fork Willamette River | 43°42′39″N 122°25′26″W | 30 | United States Army Corps of Engineers | 1961 | |
| Cougar Dam | McKenzie River | 44°07′51″N 122°14′38″W | 25 | United States Army Corps of Engineers | 1964 | |
| River Mill | Clackamas River | 45°18′00″N 122°21′00″W | 25 | Portland General Electric | 1911 | |
| Foster Dam | South Santiam River | 44°24′53″N 122°40′16″W | 20 | United States Army Corps of Engineers | 1968 | |
| Big Cliff Dam | North Santiam River | 44°45′05″N 122°17′00″W | 18 | United States Army Corps of Engineers | 1953 | |
| Dexter Dam | Willamette River | 43°55′27″N 122°48′20″W | 15 | United States Army Corps of Engineers | 1954 | |
| Owyhee Dam | Owyhee River | 43°38′30″N 117°14′37″W | 5 | Owyhee Irrigation District | 1980s | |

=== Wind ===
| Station | Location | Coordinates | Capacity (MW) | Year opened | Ref |
|---|---|---|---|---|---|
| Klondike Wind Farm | Sherman County | 45°33′23″N 120°33′03″W | 399 | 2002/2005/ 2007 | |
| Biglow Canyon Wind Farm | Sherman County | 45°39′13″N 120°36′12″W | 450 | 2007/2009/ 2010 | |
| Vansycle Wind Project | Umatilla County | 45°56′10″N 118°39′36″W | 124 | 1998/2009 | |
| Stateline Wind Project | Umatilla County | 46°00′46″N 118°48′58″W | 123 | 2001 | |
| Rattlesnake Road Wind Farm (Arlington Wind Project) | Gilliam County | 45°43′00″N 120°12′03″W | 103 | 2008 | |
| Hay Canyon Wind Farm | Sherman County | 45°31′12″N 120°34′28″W | 101 | 2009 | |
| Elkhorn Valley Wind Farm | Union County | 45°05′07″N 117°48′59″W | 101 | 2007 | |
| Leaning Juniper Wind Project | Gilliam County | 45°39′09″N 120°12′35″W | 302.3 | 2006/2011 | |
| Pebble Springs Wind Farm | Gilliam County | 45°42′43″N 120°07′30″W | 99 | 2009 | |
| Wheatfield Wind Farm | Gilliam County | 45°40′33″N 120°19′06″W | 97 | 2009 | |
| Willow Creek Wind Farm | Gilliam County and Morrow County | 45°39′12″N 119°59′29″W | 72 | 2009 | |
| Condon Wind Project | Gilliam County | 45°16′36″N 120°16′46″W | 50 | 2001/2002 | |
| Combine Hills Wind Farm | Umatilla County | 45°56′35″N 118°35′28″W | 104 | 2003/2010 | |
| Threemile Canyon Wind Farm | Morrow County | 45°40′33″N 119°56′15″W | 10 | 2009 | |
| Shepherds Flat Wind Farm; Hulburt & Horseshoe Bend | Gilliam County and Morrow County | 45°35′08″N 120°00′30″W | 845 | 2012 | |
| Star Point Wind Project | Sherman | 45°30′36″N 120°28′48″W | 98.7 | 2010 | |
| Willow Spring Wind Farm | Baker County | 44°22′55″N 117°16′23″W | 10 | 2017 | |
| PáTu Wind Farm | Sherman | 45°36′47″N 120°37′01″W | 9 | 2010 | |
| Montague Wind Power Facility | Gilliam County | 45°35′09″N 120°05′25″W | 200 | 2019 | |
| Lime Wind | Baker County | 44°23′49″N 117°16′19″W | 3 | 2011 | |
| Chopin Wind | Umatilla County | 45°52′48″N 118°27′48″W | 10 | 2016 | |
| Burnt River Wind Farm; Benson/Durbin/ Jett/Prospector | Baker County | 44°22′01″N 117°20′38″W | 40 | 2017 | |
| Four Mile Wind | Morrow County | 45°38′41″N 119°27′12″W | 10 | 2009 | |
| Wheatridge Renewable Energy Facility | Morrow County | | 300 (wind); 50 (solar) | 2020 | |

=== Biomass ===
| Name | Location | Coordinates | Capacity (MW) | Operator | Year opened | Ref |
|---|---|---|---|---|---|---|
| Springfield Power Plant | Springfield, Oregon | 44°03′25″N 122°57′20″W | 65 | International Paper | 1949/1953/1976 | |
| Dillard Complex Power Plant | Dillard, Oregon | 43°05′22″N 123°24′56″W | 51.5 | Roseburg Forest Products | 1955 | |
| Biomass One | White City, Oregon | 42°26′10″N 122°51′00″W | 36.5 | Biomass One LP | 1985/2009 | |
| Wauna Mill Power Plant | Wauna, Oregon | 46°09′14″N 123°24′24″W | 36 | Georgia-Pacific | 1996 | |
| Toledo Mill Power Plant | Toledo, Oregon | 44°36′43″N 123°55′55″W | 21.5 | Georgia-Pacific | 2007 | |
| Seneca Sustainable Energy | Eugene, Oregon | 44°06′59″N 123°10′44″W | 18.8 | Seneca Sawmill | 2011 | |
| Prairie City | Prairie City, Oregon | 44°27′18″N 118°42′40″W | 10 | D.R. Johnson | 2012 | |
| Evergreen Biopower LLC | Lyons, Oregon | 44°46′15″N 122°36′43″W | 10 | Freres Lumber Co. | 2007 | |
| BC Medford Plant | Medford, Oregon | 42°21′20″N 122°54′17″W | 8.5 | Boise Cascade | 1956/1965 | |
| Riddle | Riddle, Oregon | 42°57′59″N 123°21′27″W | 7.5 | D.R. Johnson | 1987 | |
| Winchester One | Winchester, Oregon | 43°17′23″N 123°21′42″W | 6.5 | Douglas County Lumber Co. | 2006 | |
| Madras One | Madras, Oregon | | 5 | Warm Springs Tribe | | |
| Rough and Ready | Cave Junction, Oregon | | 1.5 | Rough & Ready Lumber Co. | | |

=== Geothermal ===
| Name | Location | Coordinates | Capacity (MW) | Operator | Year opened | Ref |
|---|---|---|---|---|---|---|
| Neal Hot Springs | Malheur County, Oregon | 44°01′23″N 117°28′05″W | 30.1 | U.S. Geothermal | 2012 | |
| OIT Geo-Heat Center | Klamath Falls, Oregon | | 1.5 | Oregon Institute of Technology | 2014 | |
| Paisley Geothermal Plant | Lake County, Oregon | 42°41′45″N 120°33′28″W | 3.7 | Surprise Valley Electrification | 2015 | |

=== Solar ===
| Name | Location | Coordinates | Capacity (MW_{AC}) | Operator | Year opened | Ref |
|---|---|---|---|---|---|---|
| Gala Solar Star | Crook County, Oregon | 44°11′03″N 120°55′05″W | 56 | Avangrid Renewables | 2017 | |
| Airport Solar | Lake County, Oregon | 42°10′13″N 120°24′08″W | 47.3 | Swinerton Renewable Energy | 2019 | |
| Eagle Point Solar | Jackson County, Oregon | 42°24′00″N 121°49′47″W | 13 | Pine Gate Renewables | 2018 | |
| Adams Solar | Jefferson County, Oregon | 42°10′13″N 120°24′08″W | 10 | Swinerton Renewable Energy | 2018 | |
| Bear Creek Solar | Deschutes County, Oregon | 44°03′39″N 121°14′14″W | 10 | Swinerton Renewable Energy | 2018 | |
| Black Cap Solar (1&2) | Lake County, Oregon | 42°10′30″N 120°21′45″W | 10 | Swinerton Renewable Energy | 2012/2016 | |
| Collier Solar | Deschutes County, Oregon | 44°03′46″N 121°13′34″W | 10 | Oregon Solar Land Holdings | 2017 | |
| Elbe Solar | Jefferson County, Oregon | 44°37′05″N 121°12′18″W | 10 | Swinerton Renewable Energy | 2018 | |
| Garrett Solar | Lake County, Oregon | 42°09′36″N 120°24′00″W | 10 | Swinerton Renewable Energy | 2019 | |
| Neff Solar | Deschutes County, Oregon | 44°04′04″N 121°13′41″W | 10 | Cypress Creek Renewables | 2017 | |
| Open Range Solar | Malheur County, Oregon | 43°47′48″N 117°03′55″W | 10 | Swinerton Renewable Energy | 2016 | |
| OR Solar 3 | Klamath County, Oregon | 42°01′20″N 121°25′08″W | 10 | | 2017 | |
| OR Solar 6 | Lake County, Oregon | 42°12′32″N 120°22′04″W | 10 | | 2017 | |
| OR Solar 8 | Klamath County, Oregon | 42°14′20″N 121°35′09″W | 10 | | 2018 | |
| Thunderegg Solar | Malheur County, Oregon | 43°55′52″N 116°59′15″W | 10 | Swinerton Renewable Energy | 2016 | |
| Vale Air Solar | Malheur County, Oregon | 43°57′54″N 117°15′29″W | 10 | Swinerton Renewable Energy | 2016 | |
| Wy'east Solar | Sherman County, Oregon | 45°35′05″N 120°36′00″W | 10 | Avangrid Renewables | 2018 | |
| Tumbleweed Solar | Deschutes County, Oregon | 44°11′24″N 121°13′49″W | 9.9 | Heelstone Renewable Energy | 2017 | |
| Old Mill Solar | Klamath County, Oregon | 42°12′12″N 121°02′47″W | 6.8 | NextEra Energy Resources | 2016 | |
| Outback Solar | Lake County, Oregon | 43°14′13″N 120°29′24″W | 5 | Constellation Energy | 2012 | |
| Steel Bridge Solar | Polk County, Oregon | 45°04′05″N 123°28′12″W | 2.3 | OneEnergy | 2015 | |
| Black Cap Solar Project | Lake County, Oregon | 42°10′30″N 120°21′35″W | 2 | Obsidian Finance Group | 2012 | |
| Bellevue Solar | Yamhill County, Oregon | 45°06′44″N 123°14′05″W | 2 | EDF Renewables | 2011 | |
| OIT Solar Array | Klamath Falls, Oregon | | 2 | Oregon Institute of Technology | 2014 | |
| Baldock Solar Highway | Clackamas County, Oregon | 45°16′10″N 122°46′18″W | 1.7 | Portland General Electric | 2012 | |
| Oregon State University Rabbit Field | Benton County, Oregon | 44°34′25″N 123°19′01″W | 1.2 | SolarCity | 2014 | |
| Yamhill Solar | Yamhill County, Oregon | 45°06′32″N 123°16′43″W | 1 | EDF Renewables | 2011 | |

== Batteries ==
| Name | Location | Coordinates | Capacity (MWh / MW) | Operator | Year opened | Ref |
|---|---|---|---|---|---|---|
| Seaside | North Portland | | 800 / 200 | Portland General Electric | 2025 | |
| Sundial | Troutdale | | 800 / 200 | NextEra | 2025 | |
| Constable | Hillsboro | | / 75 | Portland General Electric | 2025 | |

== Former facilities ==
| Name | Location | Coordinates | Type | Capacity (MW) | Operator | Year opened | Year closed | Ref |
|---|---|---|---|---|---|---|---|---|
| Bull Run Hydroelectric Project | Sandy River | | Hydro | 22 | | 1908 | 2008 | |
| Boardman | Boardman | 45°41′36″N 119°48′32″W | Coal | 550 | Portland General Electric | 1980 | 2020 | |

== See also ==
- Energy in Oregon
- Pacific DC Intertie
- Celilo Converter Station
- Path 15
- Lists of Oregon-related topics
