= Naval Weapons Systems Training Facility Boardman =

- Morrow County, Oregon; Near Boardman in the United States
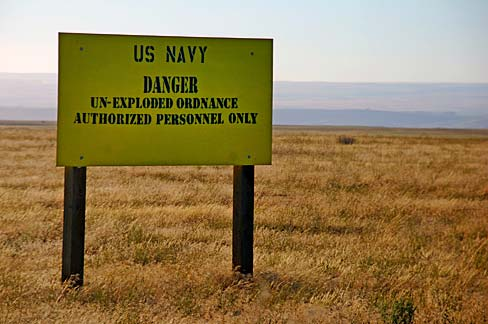
- A sign on the range warning visitors of hazards related to testing.

Site information
- Owner: Department of Defense
- Operator: United States Navy
- Open to the public: Partial

Location
- Location of Boardman Bombing Range.
- Coordinates: 45°41′21″N 119°45′33″W
- Area: 47,000 acres (190 km^{2})

Site history
- In use: 1941 - Present

Garrison information
- Current commander: Chief Machinist’s Mate Steven P. Peña Jr.

The Naval Weapons Systems Training Facility Boardman, informally known as the Boardman Bombing Range, is a military installation south of Boardman, Oregon in the United States. It is used by NAS Whidbey Island as their principal training grounds for testing EA-18G Growler aircraft and for drone testing. It is located about 70 miles (110 km) south of the Yakima Training Center, which is used by Joint Base Lewis-McChord for training exercises and about 15 miles (24 km) west of the now closed Umatilla Chemical Depot.

The range was established by the U.S. Army Air Force in 1941 as the Arlington Bombing Range, being originally named after Arlington to the west. The range is used frequently throughout the year. Beyond its primary operator at NAS Whidbey Island, the installation is also used by Oregon National Guard units based in Pendleton and Klamath Falls. About half of the original property was distributed to non-military operators when the Air Force transferred the site to the Navy. The range is also an important ecological site, with parts of it being federally protected.

== Geography ==
The range lies south of Interstate 84 within the Columbia Basin, which is in the rain shadow of the Cascade mountains. Its location in eastern Oregon makes it drier than areas to the west of the mountain range. The area has low vegetation, such as sagebrush and gradually climbs from near the Columbia River in the north to hills in the south which reach an elevation of 870 feet (270 m) above sea level. The Boardman Airport was originally built as part of the training range by the Air Force, but has since been turned over to the local government and is currently owned by the Port of Morrow.

The gate for the range is located off of Bombing Range Road, which connects Interstate 84 at its junction with US 730 to Oregon State Route 207 on the south side of the range. The portion of Bombing Range Road adjacent to the installation is owned by the Navy but is open to the public.

The arid climate, relative isolation, and flat terrain found on the installation make it an excellent location for the kind of training that the Navy uses it for. There are no year-round water bodies on the site. Runoff from rain and snow flows into two seasonal ponds. These were created to support ranching that happened before the military took over.

== History ==
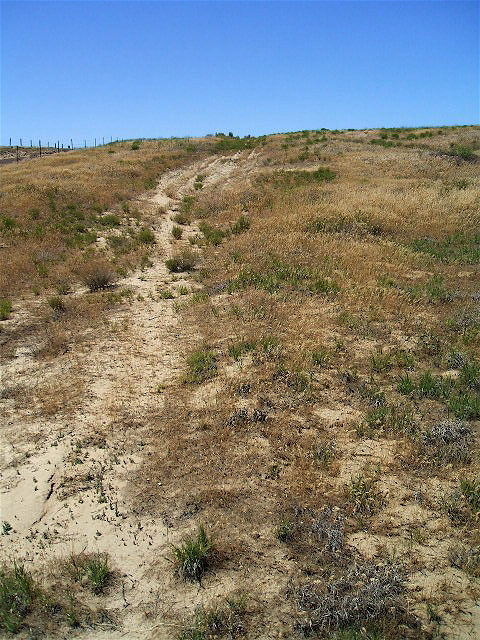
Ruts from the Oregon Trail in the bombing range.

Seven miles of the Well Springs Segment of the Oregon Trail is located within the boundaries of the installation and is listed on the National Register of Historic Places. This area is not currently bombed during practice runs, but was a handful of times during World War II. The bomb craters from these tests did not damage the ruts on the trail. The section on the Register is leased to local ranchers for grazing and includes a pioneer cemetery, the remains of a stage station, and a spring. The spring is no longer a reliable source of water due to nearby wells that have been drilled for irrigation. The cemetery is one of the largest known pioneer cemeteries on the trail.

The War Department established the range through a series of land acquisitions between 1941 and 1943 and used it as a testing site for the Army Air Force during World War II. After the war, the range continued to be used by the Air Force until 1960 when it transferred about two-thirds of the land to the Navy, with smaller portions going to the state of Oregon and the Army Corps of Engineers. When the Air Force turned over the land, it was in a checkerboard fashion. Negotiations between the state government and the Navy gave the range the boundaries it has today. The state has leased its portion of the land to Boeing, which uses it for antenna testing, while the Navy has continued to use their portion for weapons testing.

In 2012, a Chinese company named Sany acquired a wind farm adjacent to the range. Later that year, the Obama administration ordered the company to divest the acquisition after it determined that there was "credible evidence" that the company would use this to hurt national security. This order was the first of its kind since 1990.

=== Air Force ===
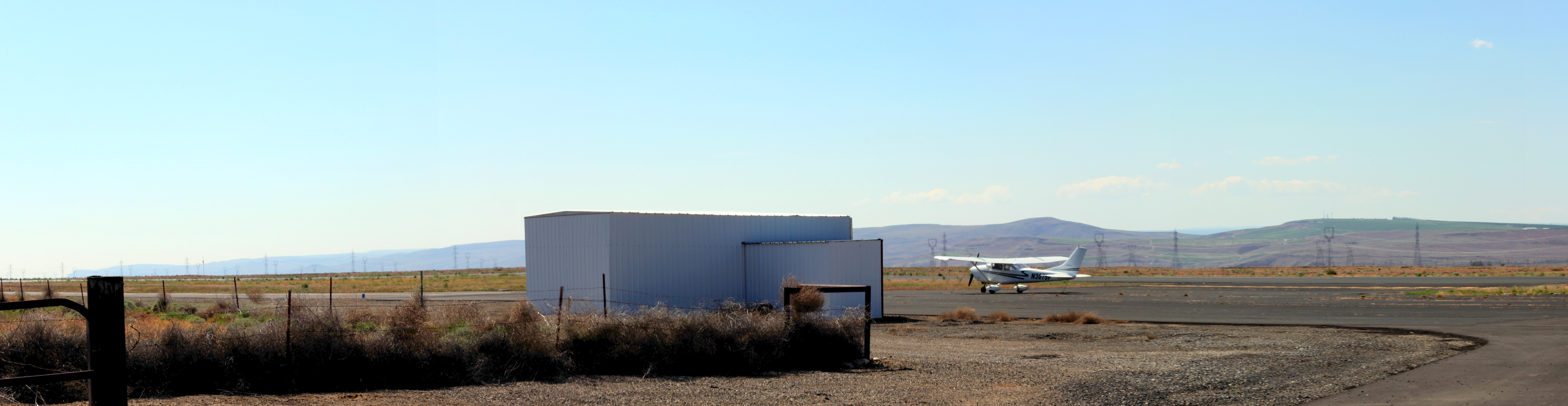
The Boardman Airport today.

The War Department established the Arlington Bombing Range by acquiring 95,986 acres (388.44 km^{2}) of land between 1941 and 1943. It was during these early years that the Boardman Airport, then known as the Boardman Flight Strip, was constructed. For the duration of World War II, Walla Walla Army Air Base used it for air-to-ground firing practice. Following the war, the Army marked the land as surplus.

In 1948, the Air Force again began training on the site. From 1952 to 1956, control of the range was granted to the 57th Air Division which was stationed at Fairchild Air Force Base near Spokane, Washington. For the period from 1948 until the Air Force finally ceased use of the range, approximately 20 buildings, a flight strip, gunnery range, and several targets were constructed. The land was marked as excess by the Air Force on August 11, 1960.

=== Transfer of ownership ===
In November 1960, the Air Force transferred 58,375 acres (236.24 km^{2}) of the land to the Navy, with 37,320 acres (151.0 km^{2}) going to the Department of Interior and 290 acres (1.2 km^{2}) ending up in the hands of the Corps of Engineers. The part apportioned to the Department of Interior ended up in the hands of the state government. The checkerboard fashion of how the Air Force distributed the land didn't work well for use as a bombing range, so the Navy entered negotiations with the state. As a result of the negotiations, the Navy ended up with its current range, located in the eastern half of the original property.

The remainder of the land is split in two portions, the first being jointly owned by the State of Oregon, Portland General Electric and Morrow County. The second portion continues to be owned by the Army Corps of Engineers, whose portion has decreased to slightly less than 14 acres (0.057 km^{2}).

== Current use ==
Since negotiations with the other owners completed, the Navy has used the range for weapons testing at high speeds. In 1978, they set aside 4,750 acres (19.2 km^{2}) for the Boardman Research Natural Area, which is a site used to study native grasses and restoration techniques. Further discussion on environmental impacts was initiated in 2000. In 2015, the Navy constructed a new office building to replace aged structures on the property that were being used for that purpose. The new building has offices for and can house six individuals. When active, the airspace comprises restricted areas R-5701 and R-5706.

=== Boardman Research Natural Area ===
The Navy set aside 4,750 acres (19.2 km^{2}) as the Boardman Research Natural Area within the facility. Access to the area for observation and experimentation is administered by the Officer in Charge, and those wishing to gain access must provide a written report of the purpose of their visit prior to gaining entry. The Research Natural Area is part of a nationwide network of protected areas of undisturbed ecosystems. Overnight camping within the area is prohibited, with visitors generally staying in Boardman. It is split into three sections, A, B, and C, which are located approximately in the center of the facility.

Soils in the area were deposited by the Missoula floods during the last ice age. Sand dunes can be found in section C of the natural area and vegetation is classified as sagebrush steppe. Plants found include Russian thistle, broom snakeweed, and needle-and-thread grass. Several bird species, such as golden eagles, are year-round residents and small mammals like the long-tailed weasel and coyotes live within the ecosystem. It is also a seasonal nesting area for long-billed curlew.

=== Non-military activity ===
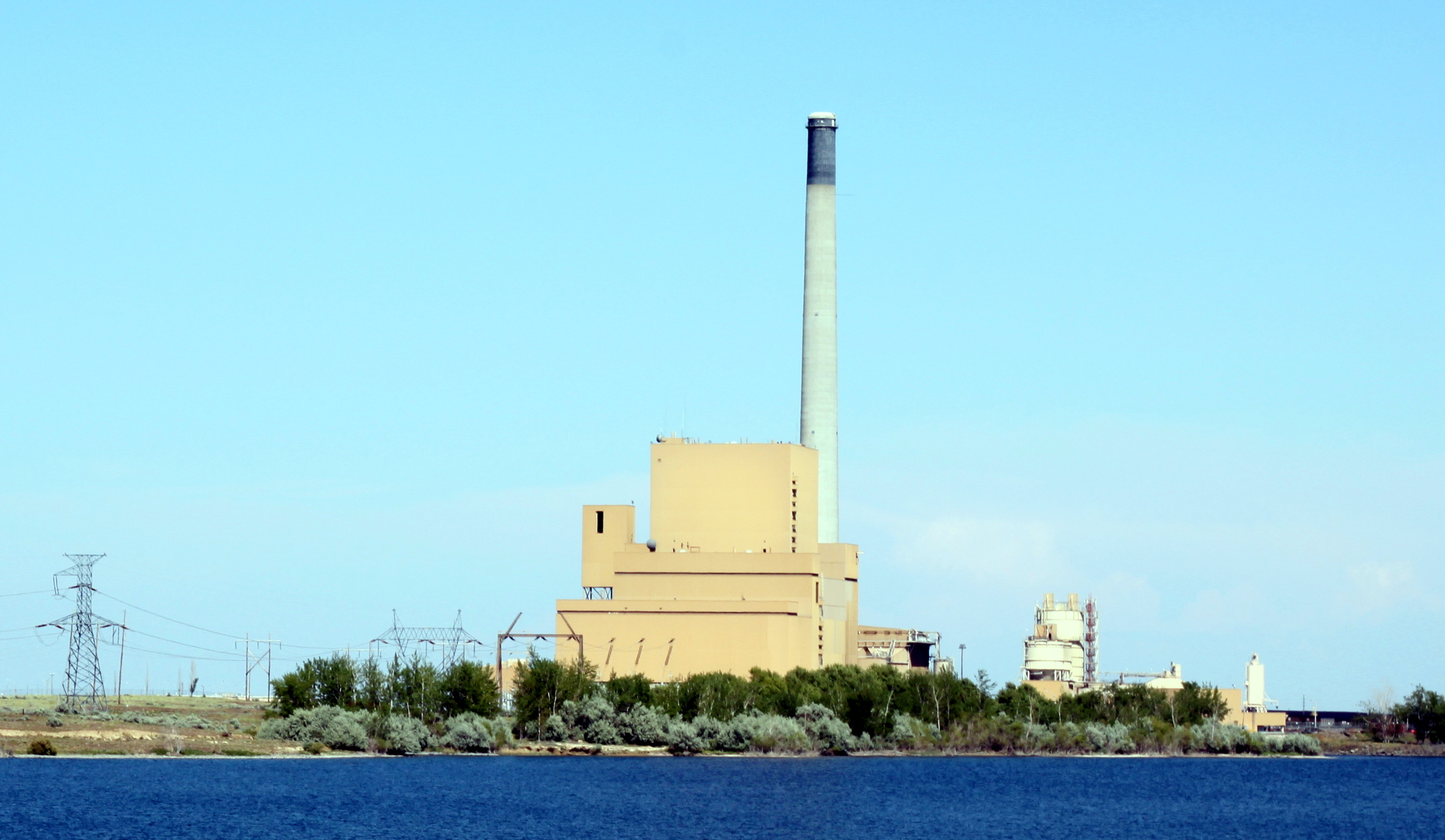
The now-demolished Boardman Coal Plant, which sat within the original bombing range.

A significant portion of the original range was transferred outside of the military to both government and private entities. The State of Oregon owns the largest portion of the former range, which it leased to the Boeing Company. Boeing had originally intended to turn the area into a space park, but later decided to use the land for farming instead and in 1974 created the Boeing-Agri Industrial Company as a wholly owned subsidiary. A lawsuit was filed against Boeing-Agri Industrial Company in relation to how the company was pulling water out of the Willow Creek arm of the reservoir behind John Day Dam. They also maintain a remote antenna range on the leased property that conducts tests for national security purposes.

Portland General Electric (PGE) owns 3,520 acres (14.2 km^{2}) of the original range. This was first used for the now-closed Boardman Coal Plant. The plant, which opened in 1975, was one of the largest polluters in Oregon. It constituted about 15% of PGE's electrical generation in 2010, but was shut down in 2020 and demolished in 2022. In 2014, PGE built a new combined cycle natural gas power plant, named Carty Generating Station, next to the coal plant to replace it.

== Future ==
Several proposals are in place for improvements to the facility which would increase its usefulness in training exercises. The Navy and Oregon National Guard want to increase training at the range and introduce new aircraft such as the F-35 Lightning II. They also propose constructing new air-to-ground weapons systems. Construction of a new landing strip and a location to service unmanned aircraft, as well as a second target area, are among the improvements to on-site infrastructure deemed necessary to accomplish these goals.

Beyond its use for air-to-ground training, the military also wants to develop several areas for ground training. These include a machine gun range, digital range, convoy live fire range, and a demolition range. The installation of remote cameras would aid in training by providing visual information to determine the accuracy of weapons tests.

Idaho Power is seeking permission from the Navy to construct 10 miles (16 km) of its new power line to tie into a proposed substation that the Bonneville Power Administration plans to build near Boardman. This routing through the range would avoid cutting through farmland.
