= Boardman Airport =

Airport in Oregon

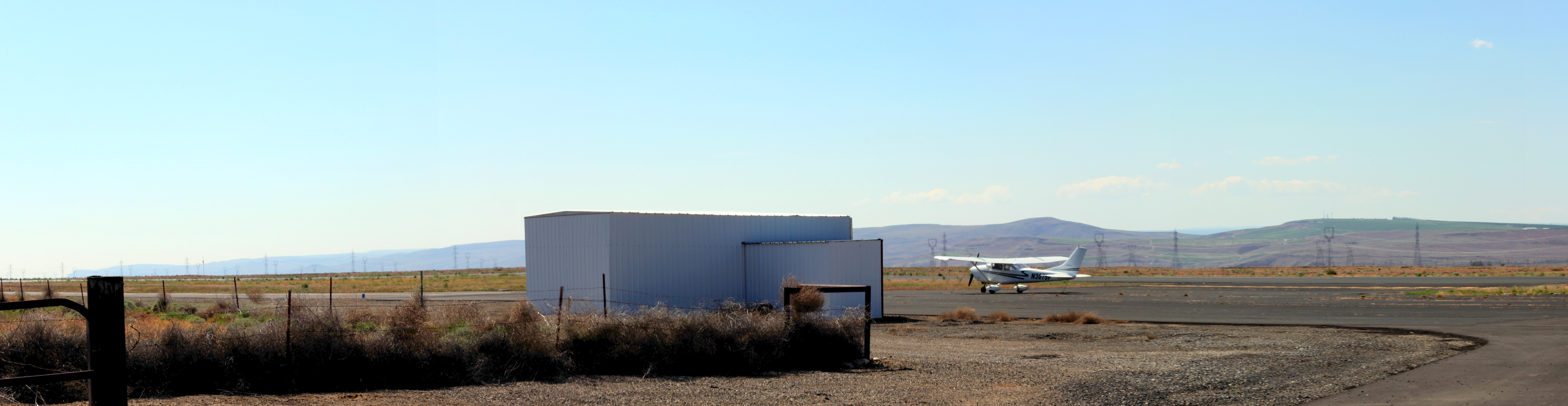
- Airplane and hangar at Boardman Airport
- IATA: none; ICAO: - FAA: M50

Summary
- Airport type: Public
- Operator: Port of Morrow
- Location: Morrow County, near Boardman, Oregon
- Elevation AMSL: 396 ft / 120.7 m
- Coordinates: 45°48′53.3700″N 119°49′13.80″W
- Website: Port of Morrow
- Interactive map of Boardman Airport

Runways
Direction	Length		Surface
Direction	ft	m	Surface
4/22	4,200	1,280	Asphalt

Boardman Airport (FAA LID: M50) is a public airport 4 miles (6.4 km) southwest of the city of Boardman in Morrow County, in the U.S. state of Oregon.

== History ==
The airport was built by the United States Army Air Forces about 1942, and was known as Boardman Flight Strip. It was an emergency landing airfield for military aircraft on training flights at the Boardman Bombing Range. It was closed after World War II, and was turned over for local government use by the War Assets Administration (WAA).

== See also ==
- Lexington Airport
