= Oregon Trail, Wells Springs Segment =

Coordinates: 45°37′57″N 119°42′57″W

- U.S. National Register of Historic Places
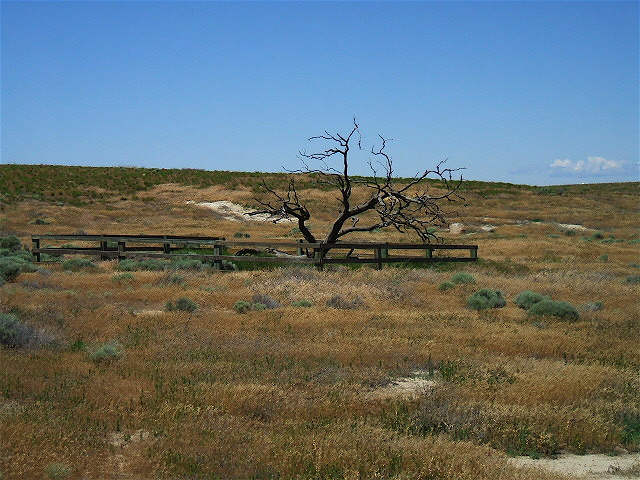
- Upper Wells Spring along the Oregon Trail

- Location within Oregon Location within the United States
- Location: Morrow County, Oregon, near Boardman
- Area: 389.7 acres (157.7 ha)
- Built: 19th century, especially 1841–46
- NRHP reference No.: 78002305
- Added to NRHP: September 13, 1978

The Oregon Trail, Wells Springs Segment, also known as the Oregon Trail, Boardman Bombing Range Segment, is part of an historic east–west migration route crossing Morrow County in the U.S. state of Oregon. About 250,000 emigrants from the United States used the trail between the 1830s and 1869 to travel between the U.S. state of Missouri and the Willamette Valley in western Oregon.

The Wells Springs segment of the Oregon Trail consists of 7 miles (11 km) of wagon ruts bounded on each side by a 200-foot (61 m) strip of land. The segment runs from mile point 1,728 on the trail to mile point 1,735; that is 1,735 miles (2,792 km) from the trail's starting point in Missouri. In addition to the trail segment and the 400-foot (120 m) strip, the site includes remnants of a stage station, a pioneer cemetery, and part of upper Wells Spring.

The cemetery is one of the largest emigrant cemeteries along the Oregon part of the Oregon Trail. The emigrants' graves are unmarked and uncounted, but the site includes a memorial to Cornelius Gilliam of the Oregon Volunteers, who died by accidental gunshot in the vicinity. The cemetery is protected by a fence, which keeps out sheep and cattle that otherwise graze on leased land on and near the trail.

Although it crosses the Boardman Bombing Range, the trail is in a buffer zone not subjected to bombing. Bomb craters near the trail were created by practice bombing runs during World War II, when the range was controlled by the United States Army. The agency in charge of the range in the 21st century is the Naval Air Station Whidbey Island, in the U.S. state of Washington.

== See also ==
- National Register of Historic Places listings in Morrow County, Oregon
