= Hardman IOOF Lodge Hall =

- U.S. National Register of Historic Places
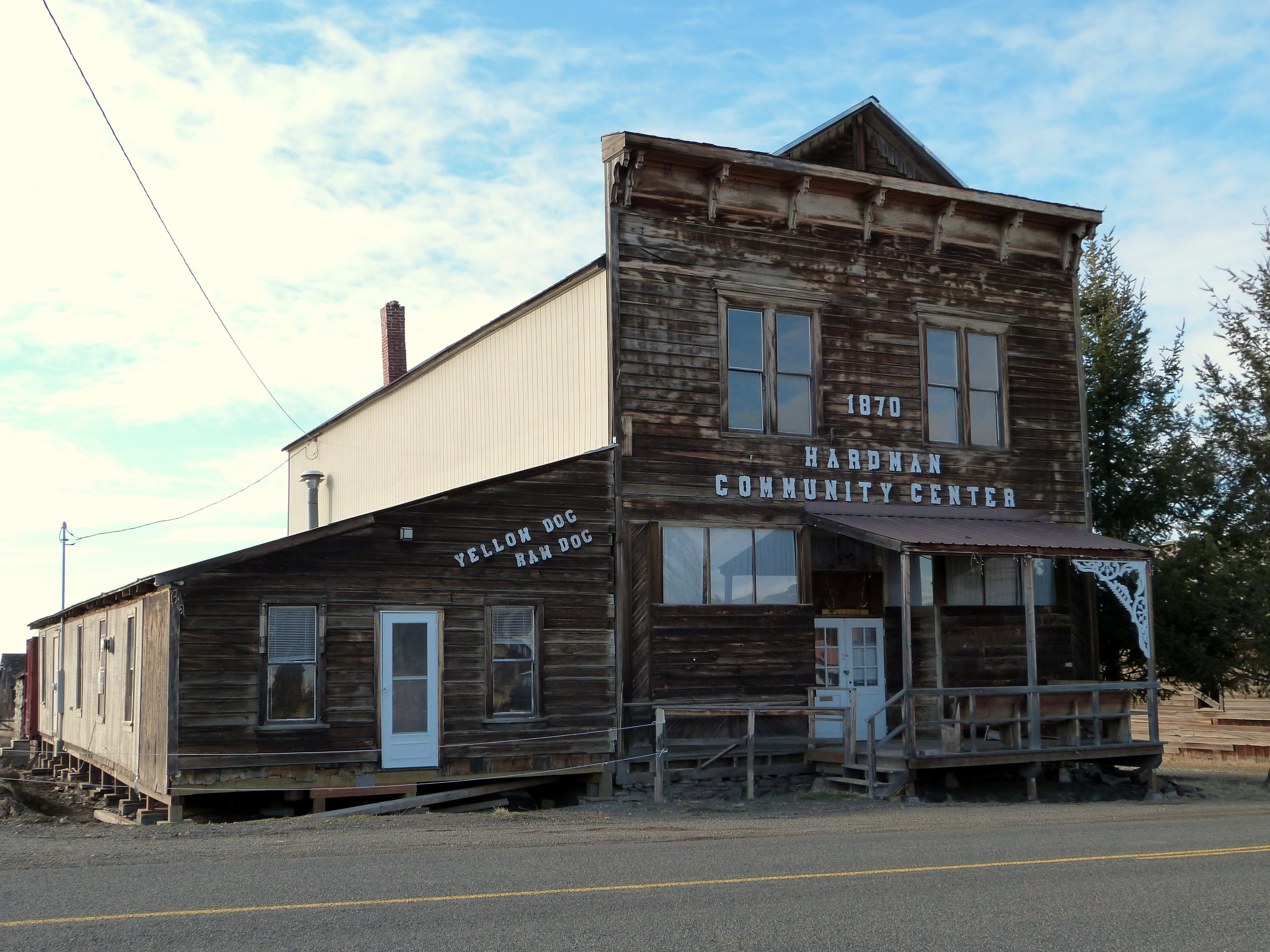
- Exterior in 2012

- Location within Oregon Location within the United States
- Location: 51186 Hwy. 207; Hardman, Oregon
- Coordinates: 45°10′8.94″N 119°40′56″W
- Area: Less than 1 acre (0.40 ha)
- Built: 1900
- Built by: Ben Cox and Tom D. Colliver
- Architectural style: Late Victorian: Italianate
- NRHP reference No.: 12000484
- Added to NRHP: August 17, 2012

The Hardman IOOF Lodge Hall (also known as the Hardman Community Center and the Lone Balm Lodge #82) is a meeting hall in the ghost town of Hardman in the U.S. state of Oregon. Completed in 1900, it was added to the National Register of Historic Places in 2012.

The two-story structure has a stone foundation, a wooden frame, a false front extending above the roof line, and Italianate details. A major alteration in 1946 added a one-story dining room and kitchen to the south side of the original building.

Interior areas amount to 3,300 square feet (310 m^{2}) on the first floor and 1,980 square feet (184 m^{2}) on the second. In addition to the add-on dining room and kitchen, the property includes a woodshed and an outhouse, neither of which remains functional.

The building housed the Lone Balm Lodge #82 of the International Order of Odd Fellows (IOOF) and its associated organization, the Mistletoe Rebekah Lodge #25, starting in 1900. Settler David N. Hardman, for whom the community is named, was named leader of the Lone Balm Lodge in 1886, before construction of the existing building.

The Hardman IOOF Lodge Hall over the years served as a social center, concert hall, and dance hall, as well as the Lone Balm meeting place. Merchants rented space on the first floor for a general store and other businesses, the last of which closed in 1968. Like other fraternal and sororal secret societies of the time, the Hardman Odd Fellows and Rebekahs formed committees to help needy neighbors in an era before widespread social services were available from the government. In 1964, the Lone Balm Lodge merged with the Willow Lodge of Heppner and stopped meeting in Hardman.

== See also ==
- National Register of Historic Places listings in Morrow County, Oregon
