= Gilliam and Bisbee Building =

Historic building in Heppner, Oregon, U.S.

- U.S. National Register of Historic Places
- Location within Oregon Location within the United States
- Location: 106 E. May Street; Heppner, Oregon
- Coordinates: 45°21′12″N 119°33′12″W
- Area: 0.16 acres (0.065 ha)
- Built: 1919
- Built by: T. G. Denissee
- Architectural style: Late 19th and early 20th century American Commercial
- NRHP reference No.: 90000840
- Added to NRHP: June 1, 1990

The Gilliam and Bisbee Building is an historic commercial structure in Heppner in the U.S. state of Oregon.

== Description and history ==
Built in 1919 for the Gilliam and Bisbee Hardware Company to replace a building destroyed by fire in 1918, it was added to the National Register of Historic Places in 1990.

The two-story rectangular building measures 50 by 143 feet (15 by 44 m), and it has a full basement. The foundation and walls are made of concrete. The front facade is of tan-colored brick paired with darker brown brick above the storefront, its window pairs, and its decorative horizontal corbel courses. Strong vertical elements include pilasters that extend above the roof line and are topped with imitation chimney caps.

Originally, the first floor contained retail space, a stock room, a business office, a plumbing shop, a freight elevator (which served both floors and the basement), stairways, and perhaps a leased office. An open display space for farm implements occupied the second floor, also the likely site of a restroom.

Members of the Gilliam and Bisbee families, arriving in the 1860s, were among the earliest settlers in the region. Two members of the second generation, Timothy Bisbee and Frank Gilliam, both involved in stock raising, became brothers-in-law in 1882 and by 1889 were in business together as the Gilliam and Bisbee Hardware Company. Subsequent generations of both families worked in the store through the late 1950s.

In 2019, the Howard and Beth Bryant Foundation restored and renovated the Gilliam & Bisbee Building into an event center, apartment-like suites, and a conference room.

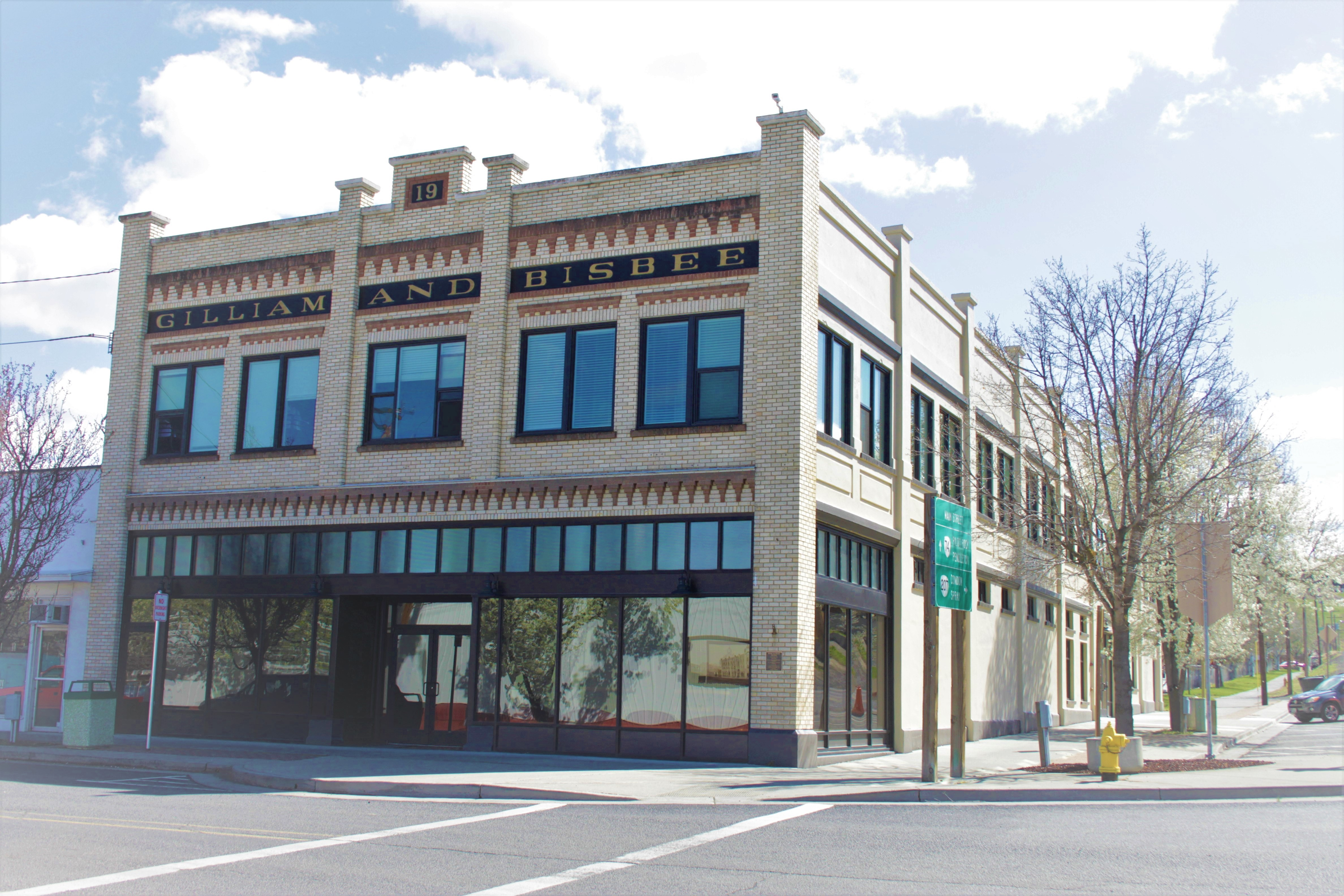
Restored exterior, 2019

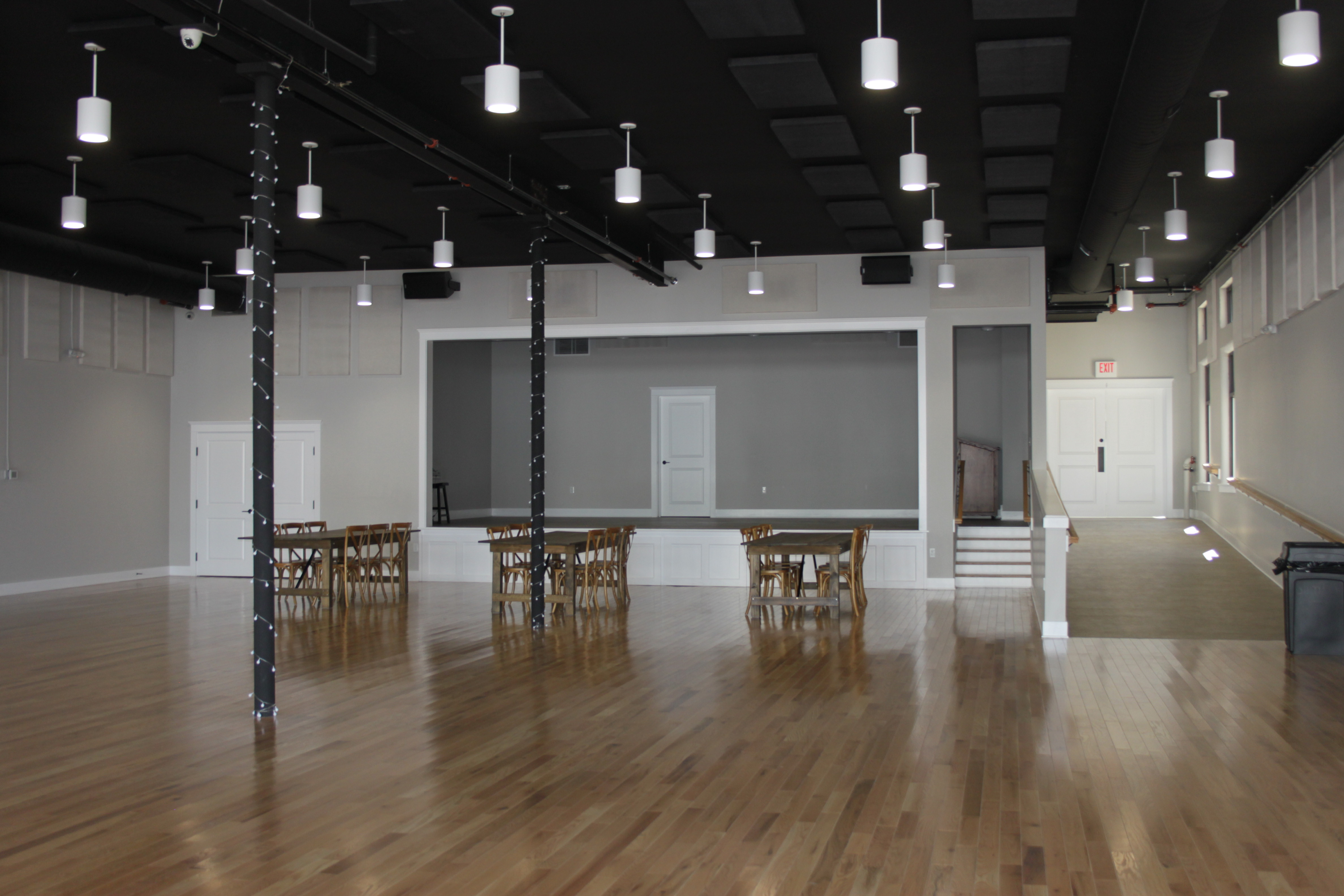
Main Event Hall

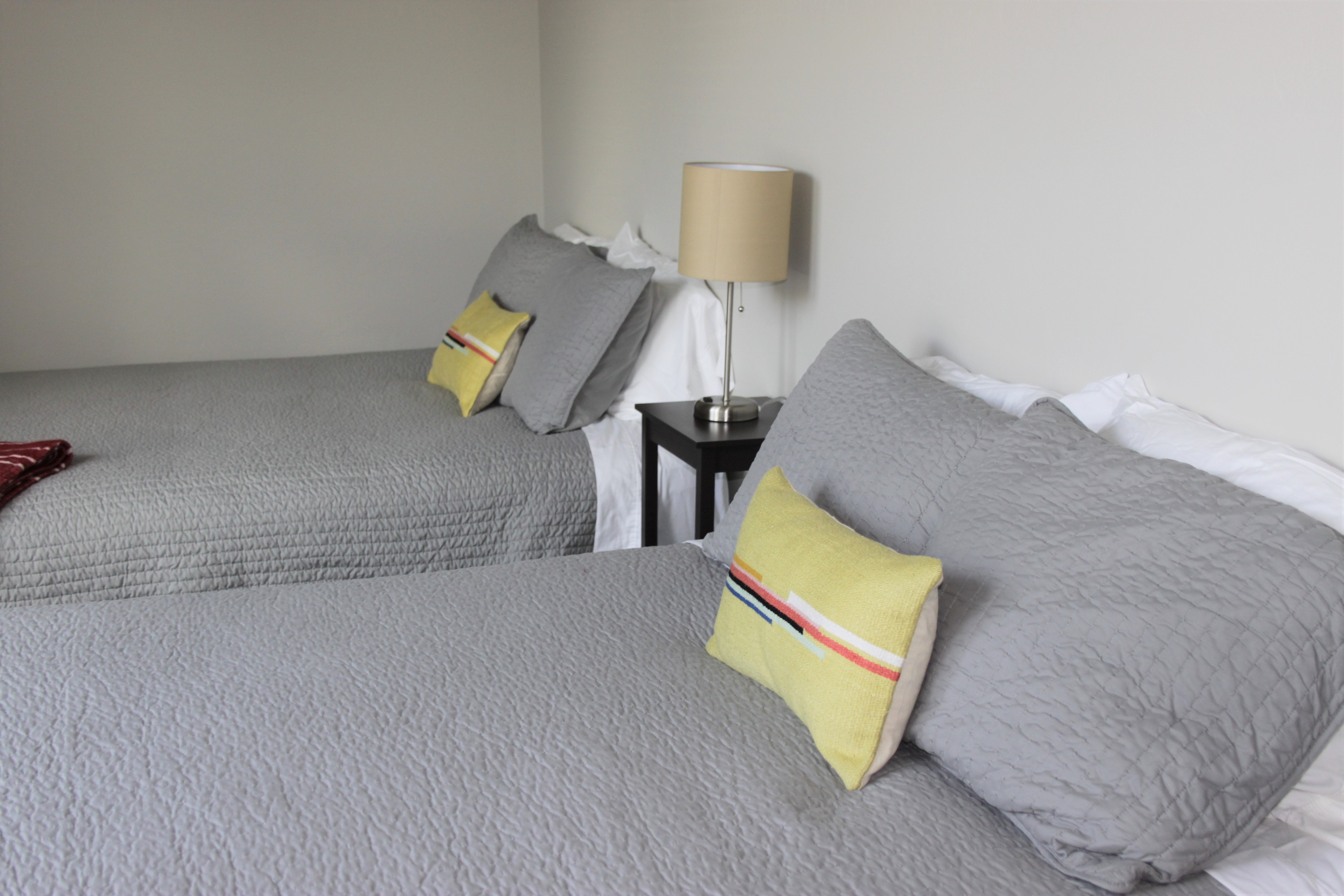
GB Suites, 2019

== See also ==
- National Register of Historic Places listings in Morrow County, Oregon
