= Hardman Hotel =

Hotel in Hardman, Oregon, US

Coordinates: 45.1704°N 119.6821°W

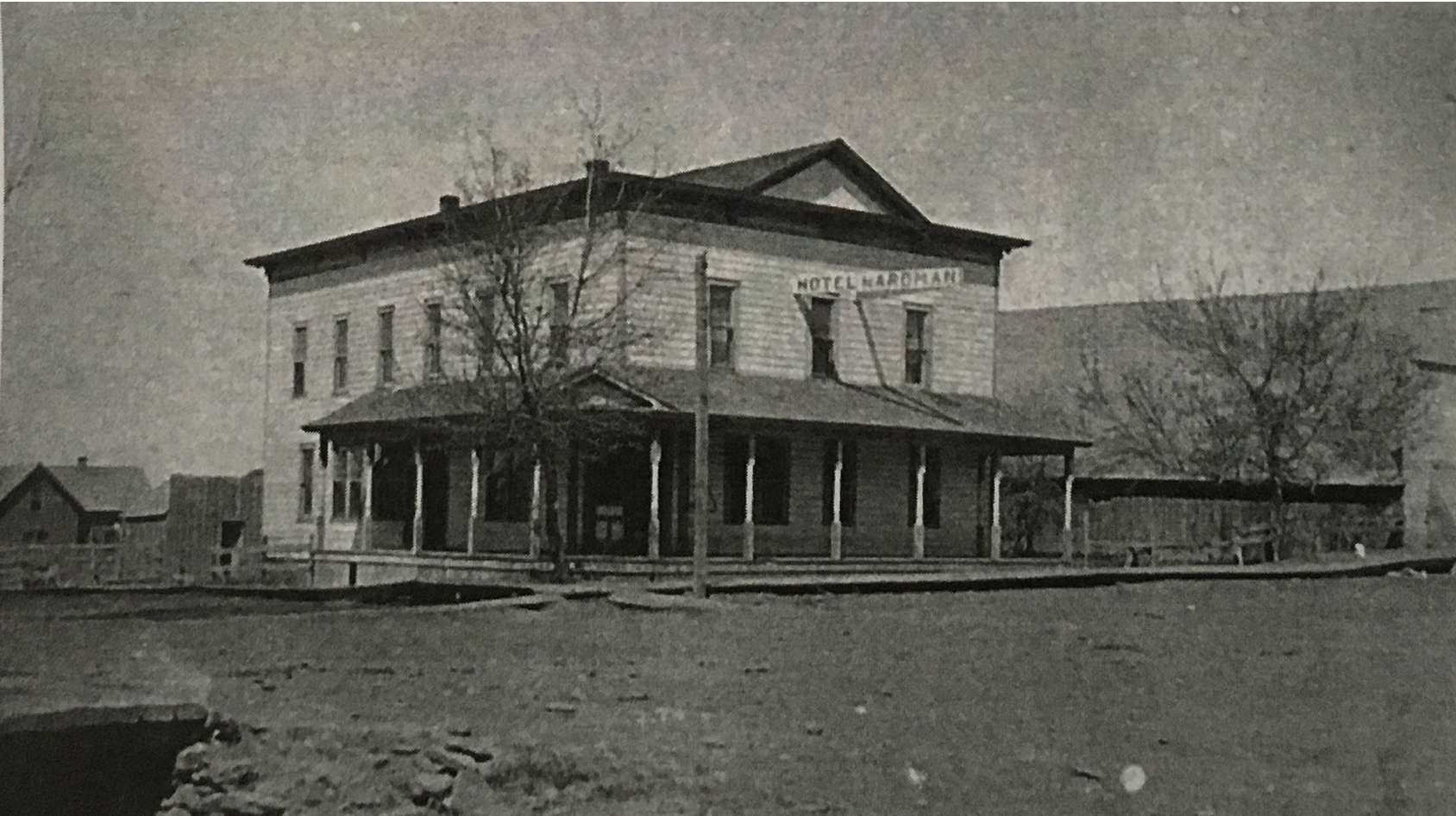
Image of the Hardman Hotel (Hardman, Oregon)

The Hardman Hotel is a historic hotel that operated in Hardman, Oregon, during the town’s peak.

== History ==
The hotel's earliest confirmed owner was Charles H. Hams who was listed as the proprietor in August 1904. Hams was an Englishman who immigrated to the United States in 1872 and began homesteading in the Hardman area in 1884. He eventually sold his ranch and cattle business in 1903 and purchased a hotel and livery station in Hardman.

J. C. Owen assumed proprietorship of the Hardman Hotel around 1911. Other proprietors included F. M. Scrivner, E. Chapel, W. H. Royse, J. McDonald, and B. F. DeVore.

The Hardman Hotel was described circuitously via one local news report which described Royse as having "advertised room and board [at the hotel] at $12 a month; single meals, 25 cents." Moreover, Royse was quoted as saying, "a large quality of hay and grain always kept on hand, and the best possible care taken of all teams left in my charge." The hotel hosted dance parties for Hardman youngsters, according to a local press report.

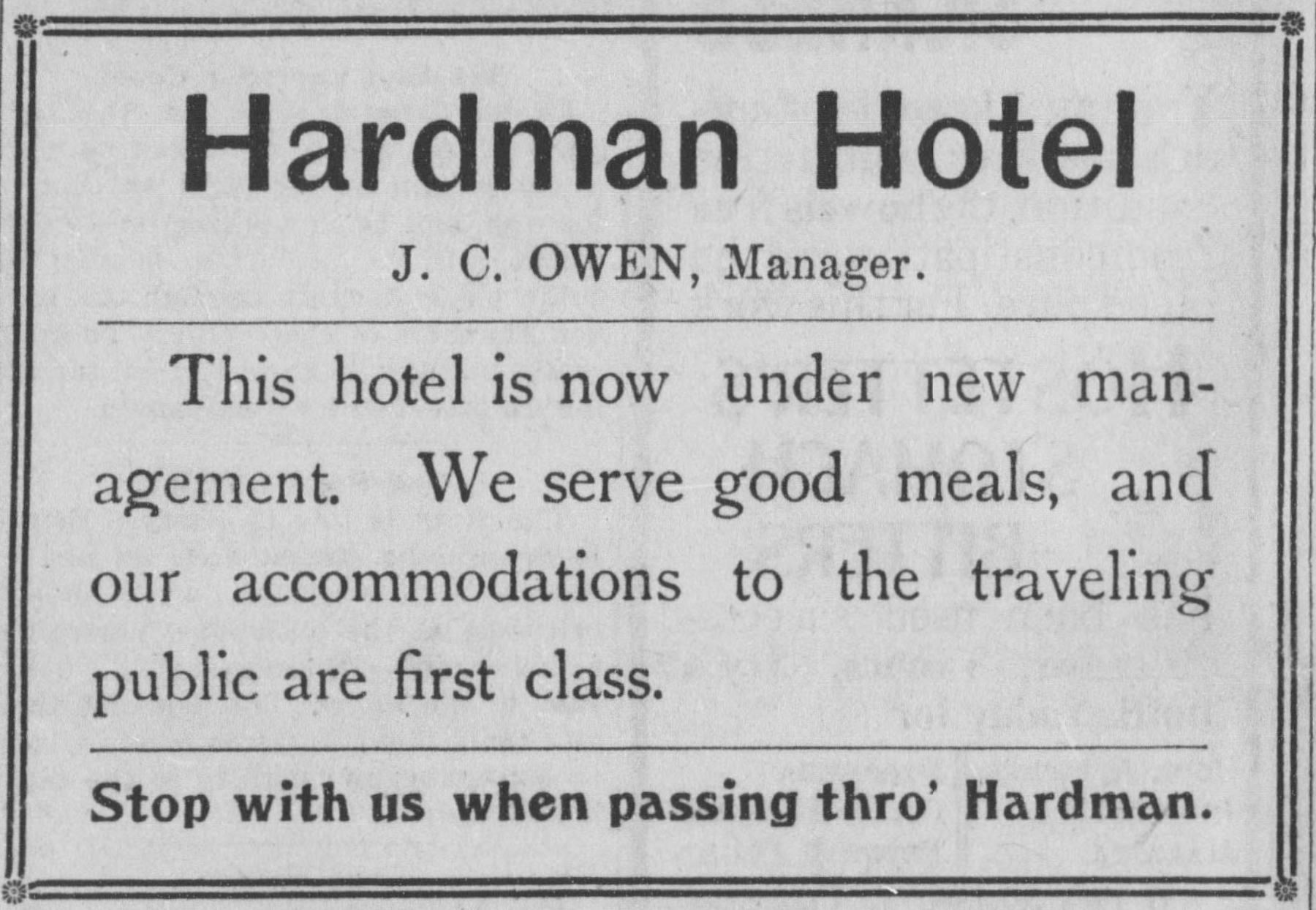
1911 Advertisement for the Hardman Hotel (Hardman, OR)

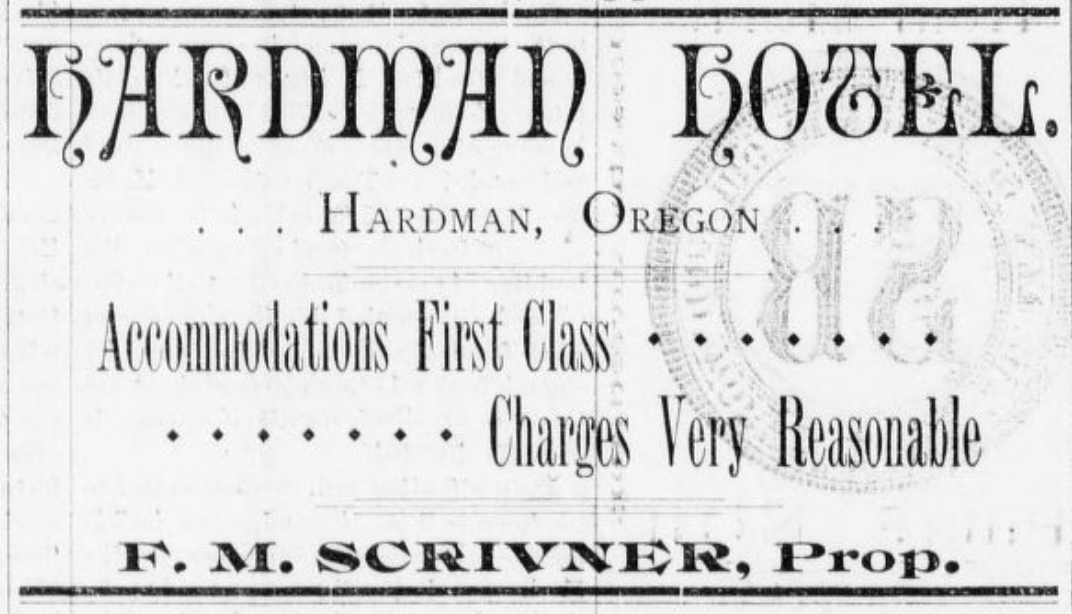
1892 Advertisement for the Hardman Hotel (Hardman, OR)
