= Hay Canyon Wind Farm =

Wind farm in Oregon, United States

Coordinates: 45.528629°N 120.607824°W

The Hay Canyon Wind Farm is an electricity generating wind farm facility located in Moro, Oregon, United States. It is owned by Iberdrola Renewables and began operations in 2009. The facility has a generating capacity of 101 megawatts. The farm sells power to the Snohomish County Public Utility District.

== See also ==
- List of wind farms in the United States
- Wind power in Oregon
