= Hardman, Oregon =

- Unincorporated community
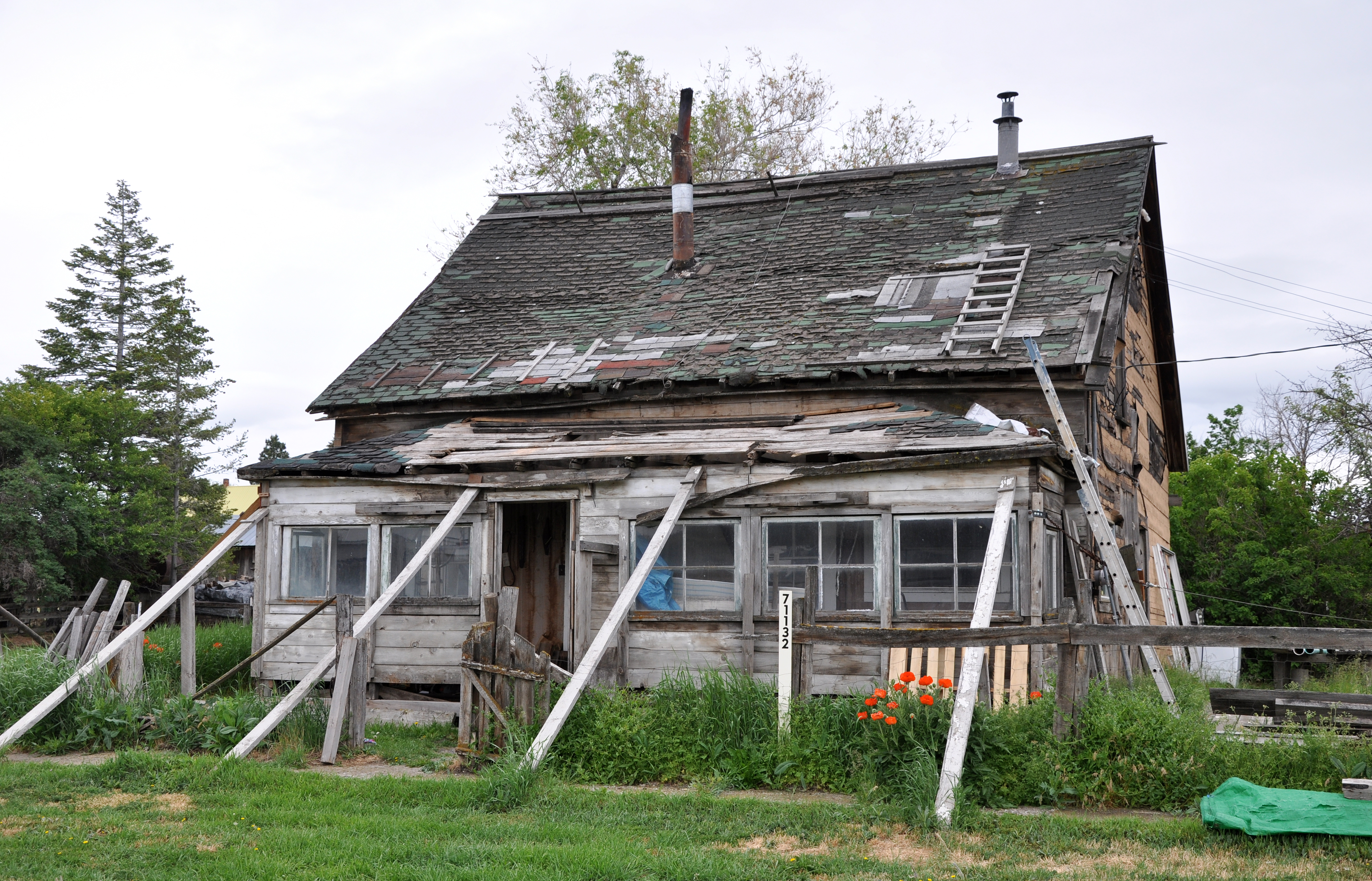
- Collapsing house in Hardman

- Location within the state of Oregon Hardman (the United States)
- Coordinates: 45°10′11″N 119°40′55″W
- Country: United States
- State: Oregon
- County: Morrow
- Elevation: 3,563 ft (1,086 m)

Population (1990)
  - Total: 20
- Time zone: UTC-8 (Pacific)
  - Summer (DST): UTC-7 (Pacific)
- Area code: 541
- GNIS feature ID: 1136356

Hardman is a historic community located in southern Morrow County, in the U.S. state of Oregon. It is on Oregon Route 207 about 20 miles (32 km) southwest of Heppner and 32 miles (51 km) north of Spray. Hardman is at an elevation of about 3,600 feet (1,100 m) in an agricultural area slightly west of the Blue Mountains of northeastern Oregon. Rock Creek, a tributary of the Columbia River, flows northwest by Hardman and to its south to meet the river at Lake Umatilla. A former social and commercial center for surrounding farm communities, Hardman became a ghost town following the completion of a railroad to Heppner in the 1920s. The main surviving commercial building, the Hardman IOOF Lodge Hall, was added to the National Register of Historic Places (NRHP) in 2012.

== History ==
The plateau upon which Hardman sits had long been touted in the newspapers of the late 1800s. Advertisements in local papers, for example, lavished praise upon the "thriving little trade center" of Hardman. The land surrounding Hardman, for example, was described as "one of the best farming sections in Morrow county, or in any county." Marketers hailed Hardman country as "the greatest stock range in the West." It was said in the late 1800s that the location of Hardman was grand. A local newspaper advertisement described the town as "high enough to secure plenty of fresh air, level enough for the building of a magnificent city, well-watered and surrounded by the richest and most favored soil under the sun, far enough from all the other places of business to insure excellent results if energy is property directed."

"Hardy" pioneers began settling the land in the late 1800s. These pioneers "ventured into these fields for the purpose of building homes." Their success, a local newspaper stated, prompted others to follow. The community grew slowly and steadily yet "suffered in its infancy from causes which are common in many other cases of a similar nature and condition."

The first settlers in the area were John F. Royse and his brother. Royse was described as a "thoroughbred rustler" in a 3 June 1892 article detailing the community of Hardman. Royse first settled in the Willamette Valley, but circa 1872 he moved to the "bunch grass hills" in present-day Hardman. Royse started a school in 1879 at a place called Dairyville, which locals referred to as "Rawdog". A mile to the northwest of Dairyville was the community of Adamsville, known to the locals as "Yallerdog". Locals called the place "Dogtown" after its two predecessors. Why the locals named these communities after dogs is unknown.

At the same time, David N. Hardman, who arrived in the county in 1878 after "crossing the plains some forty-two years ago with an ox train." He started a settlement a mile to the southeast and became a prominent civic leader in the nascent community. A post office named Hardman was established there in 1881 with Hardman as postmaster after "the people demanded a post office and Mr. Hardman circulated a petition and did other work necessary to effect the location of a post office, which was named in honor of its originator." In 1882, the Hardman post office was moved to Dairyville but retained the Hardman name. Adamsville post office was established in 1884 and closed in 1885, and thereafter, all activity centered on what is now Hardman, where the post office ran intermittently until 1968.

Mr. Hardman served as postmaster for a number years, but ultimately asked to be relieved of the "pressing cares of mercantile life." He subsequently closed out large stock of goods and sent in his resignation as postmaster. Mr. Hardman filled public positions with "great credit," and was the republican nominee for county commissioner at one time. In an 1892 article detailing Hardman, Mr. Hardman called the area, "this is the easiest country on the coast in which to make a good living."

According to the NRHP nomination form for the IOOF hall, a history of Umatilla and Morrow counties that was published in 1902 said that Hardman at that time had three general stores, two hotels, two feed stables, two blacksmiths, a saloon, a barber shop, a church, schools, a post office, a newspaper, and a telephone office. Other infrastructure included two meeting halls, a skating rink, and a racetrack.

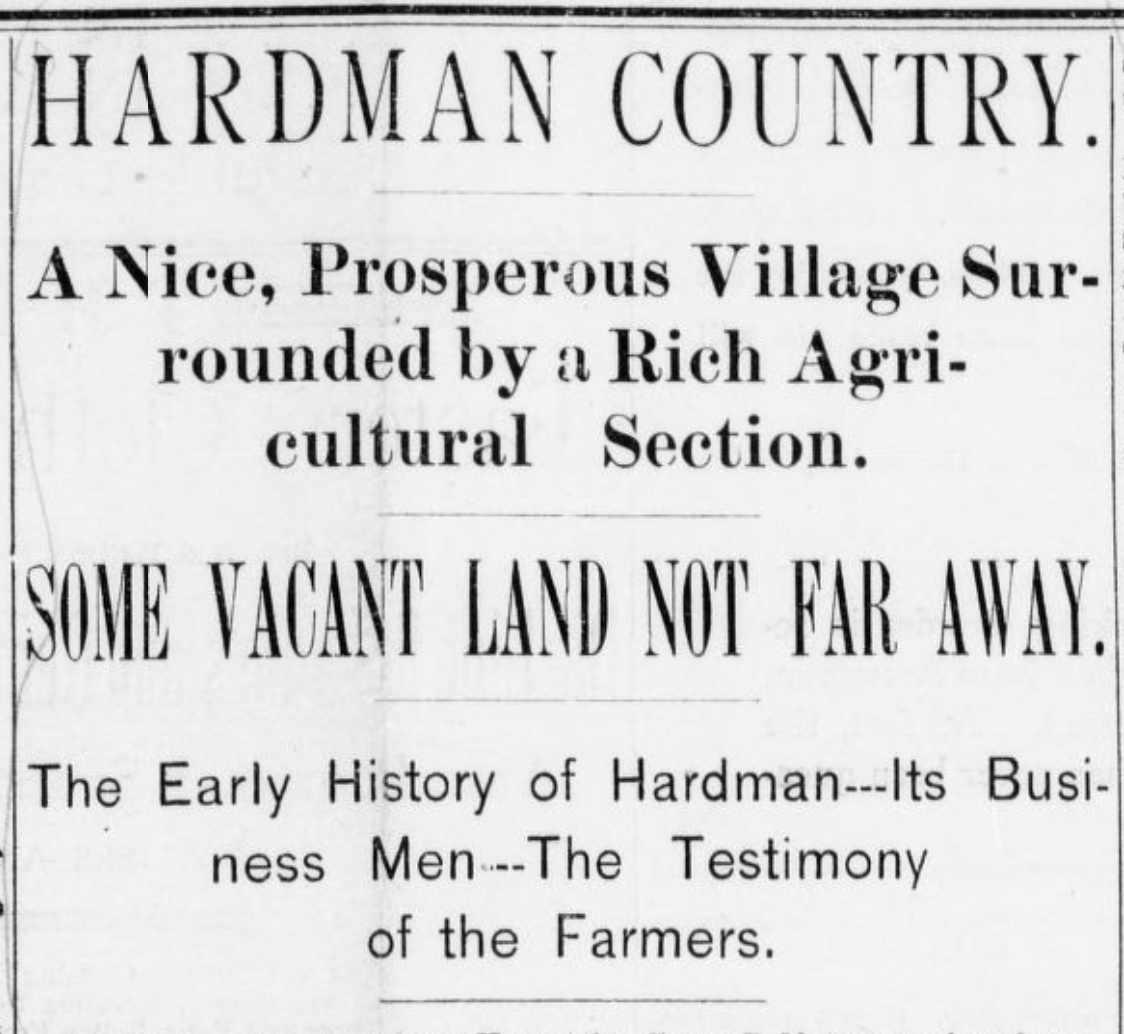
1892 article in the Heppner Gazette (Heppner, Oregon) advertising Hardman, Oregon.

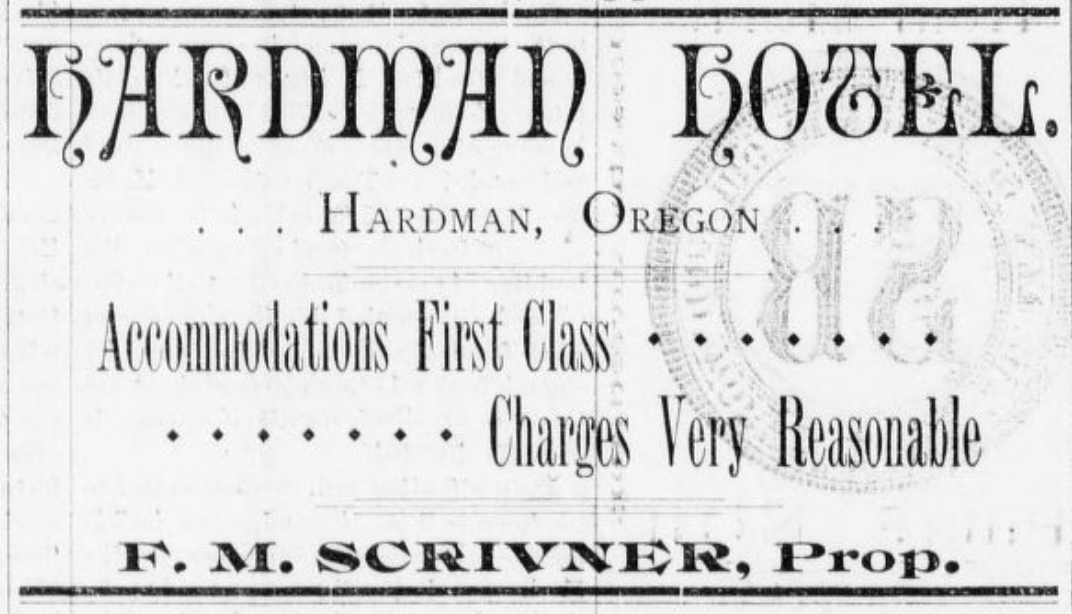
1892 advertisement for the Hardman Hotel (Hardman, Oregon) published in the Heppner Gazette (Heppner, Oregon).

== See also ==
- List of ghost towns in Oregon
- Hardman Hotel
