= Boardman Coal Plant =

Coal-fired power plant located in Boardman, Oregon

Coordinates: 45°41′36″N 119°48′25″W

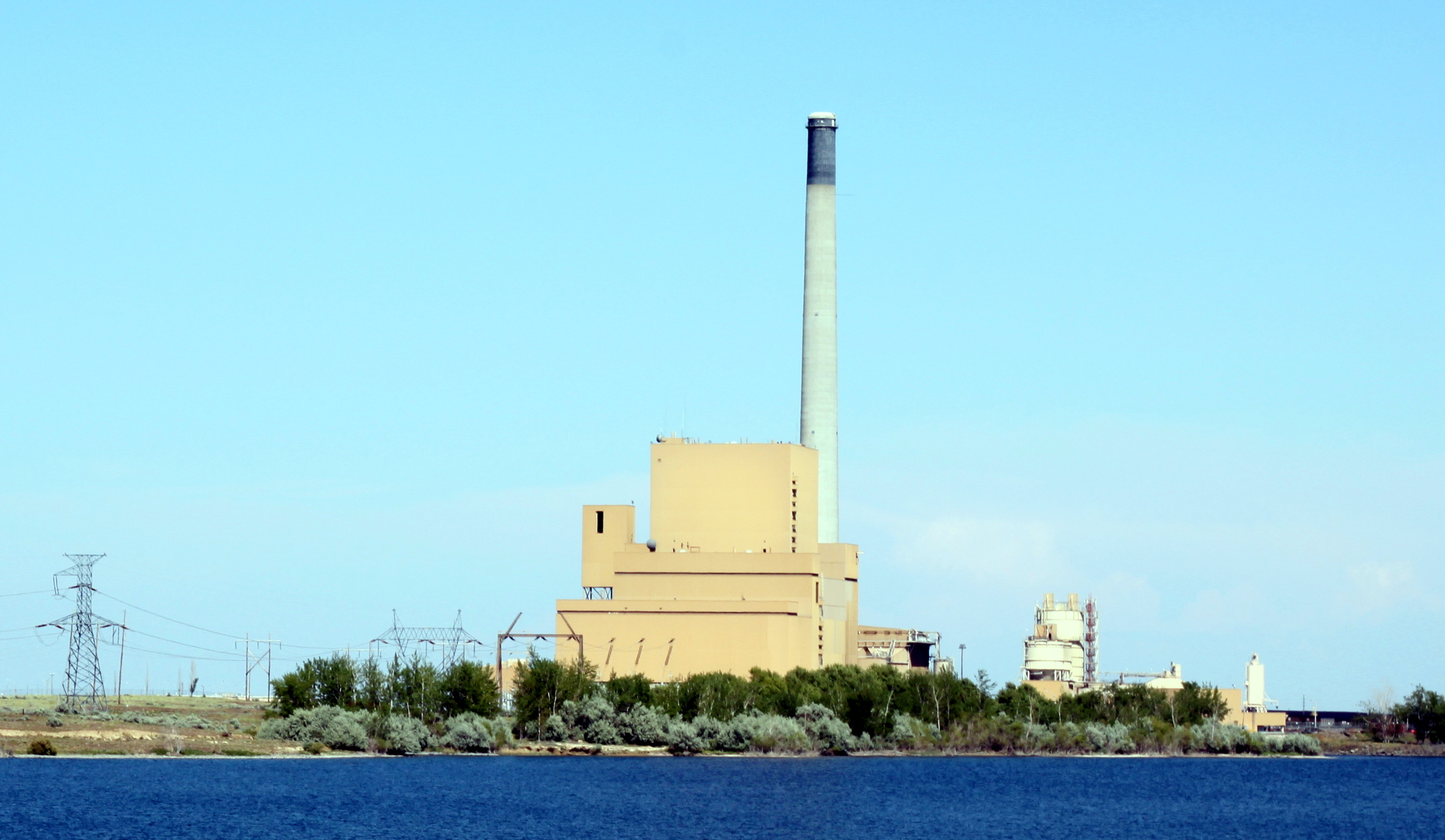
The Boardman plant.

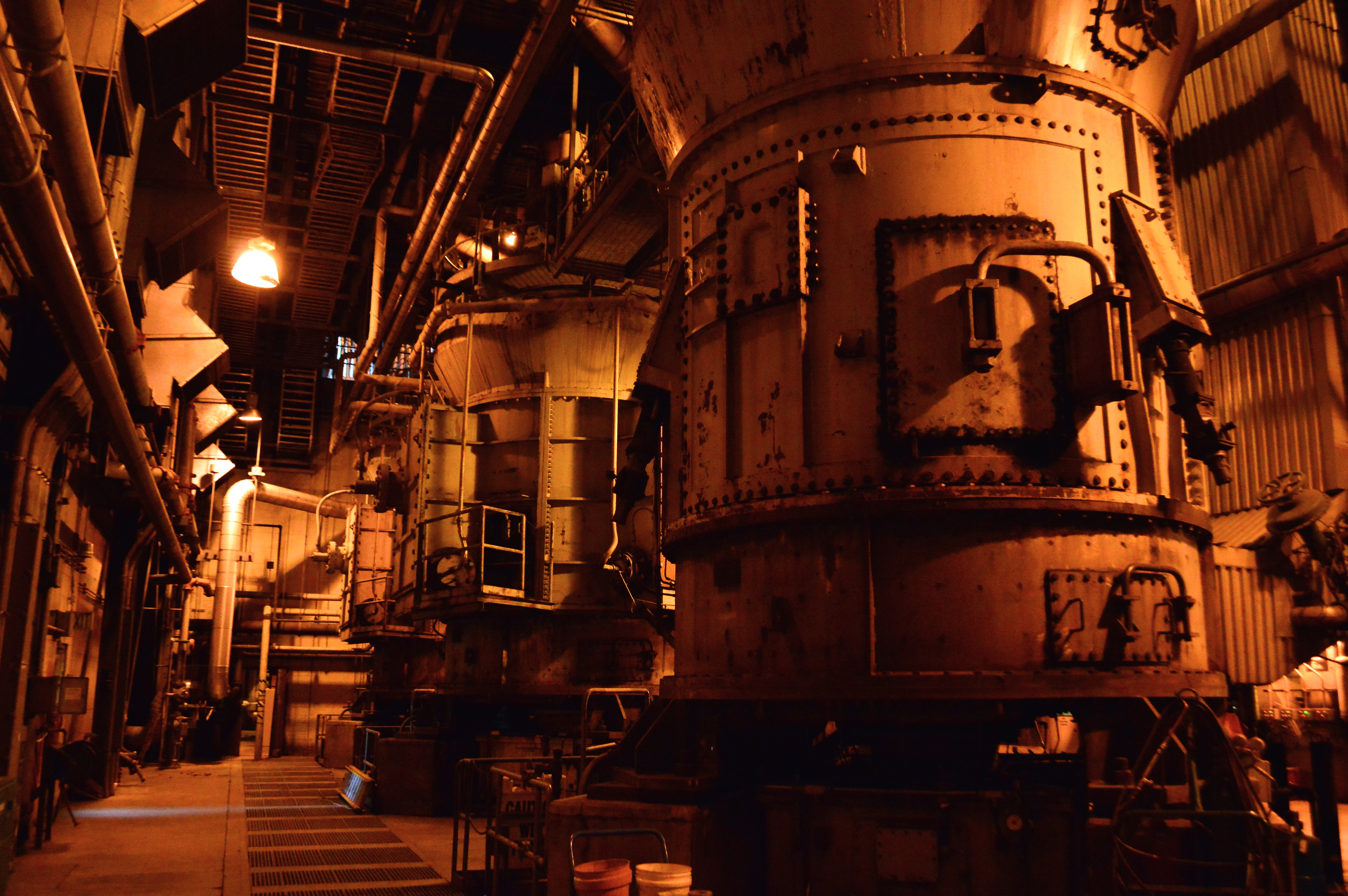
Interior of Boardman Plant showing coal grinding machines.

The Boardman Coal Plant was a coal-fired power plant located in Boardman, Oregon. The facility had a nameplate capacity of 550 megawatts (MWs) and is owned by Portland General Electric. In 2010, the plant was the only remaining coal powered plant in Oregon and received much attention from regional media due to its being the largest single source of greenhouse gas emissions in the state with environmental groups such as the Sierra Club calling for its closing.

In 2014, PGE built a new $500 million, 450 MW combined cycle natural gas power plant, named Carty Generating Station, next to the coal plant.

In October 2020, Portland General Electric announced that the coal plant has been permanently closed and was demolished in 2022, ending Oregon's legacy of coal-fired power generation.

== Background ==
The Boardman plant was authorized in 1975, just two years before the 1977 Clean Air Act amendments, which would have required the plant to meet stricter emission standards. When it was operating, the plant accounted for 65% of stationary SO_{2} emissions, and 7% of CO_{2} emissions in Oregon.

The Boardman plant was one of PGE's largest power stations, producing 15% of the utility's electricity in 2009.

== Recent action ==
Portland General Electric's original plan involved operating the plant until 2040; this would require installing over $500 million of pollution control equipment on the plant by 2017 in order to comply with federal and state clean air standards. In early 2010, however, PGE announced that they were considering an alternative plan for the Boardman plant that would close it in 2020.

In April 2010, PGE decided to close the plant in 2020 to save $470 million in upgrades they would have been required to install had they kept the plant operating until 2040. The decision is contingent upon favorable decisions in a lawsuit and possible federal regulations. In December 2010, the state's environmental protection agency approved the plans for the 2020 closing.

PGE started building a second gas-fired generating station at Boardman (the Carty Generating Plant) in 2014.

The plant was being dismantled in 2021, with the structure being demolished in 2022.

== See also ==
- List of power stations in Oregon
- Coal power in the United States
- Centralia Coal Plant
