= U.S. Geothermal =

U.S. Geothermal Inc.
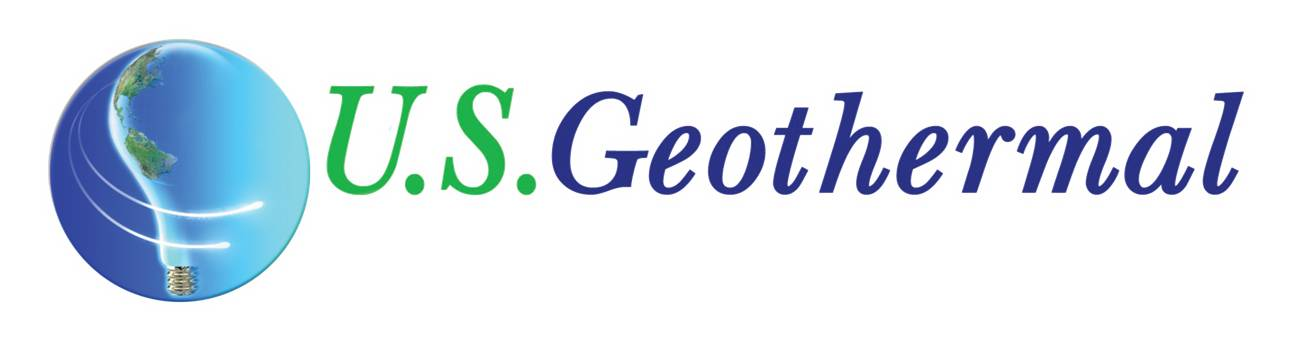

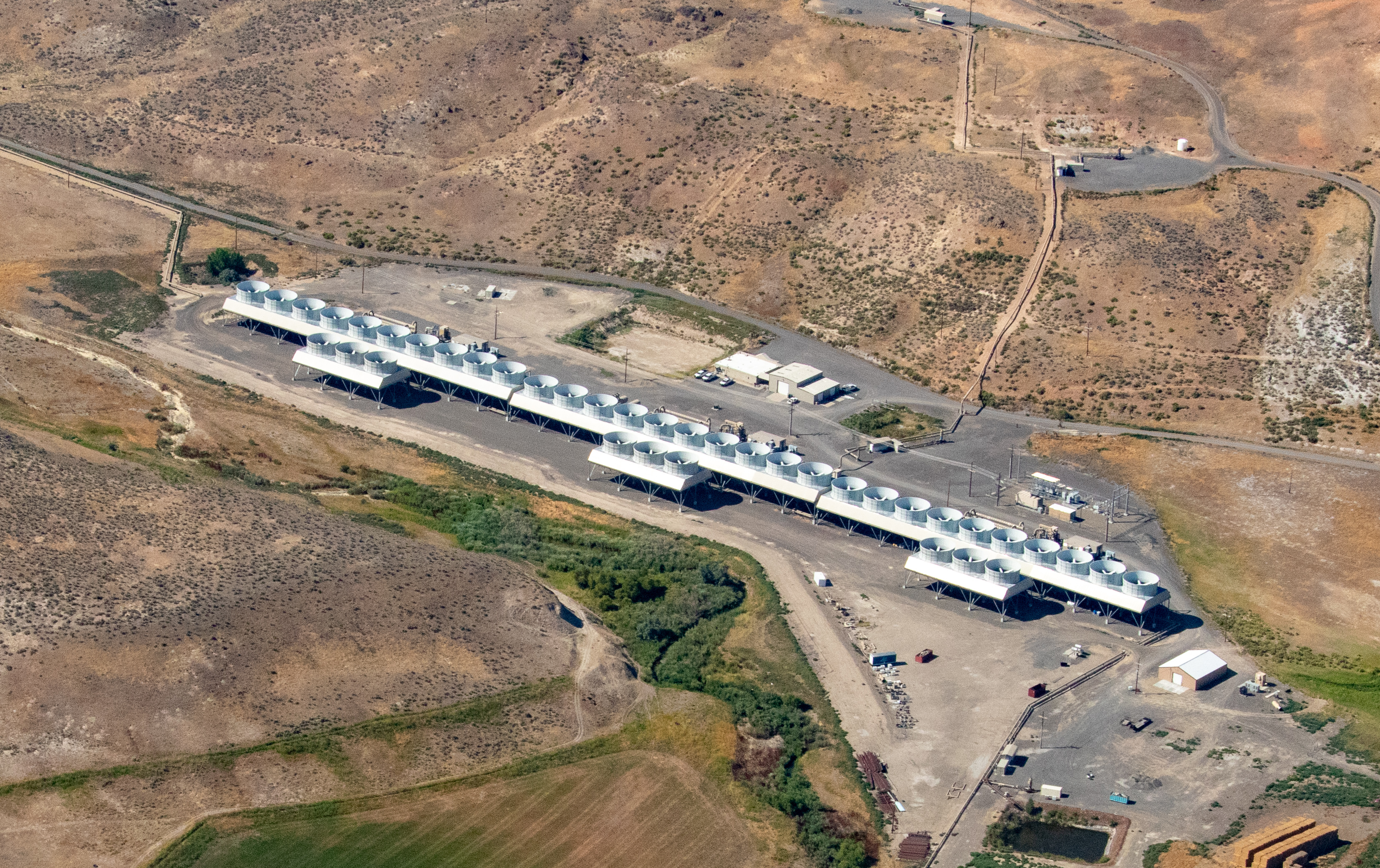
- Neal Hot Springs geothermal plant
- Type: Public
- Traded as: AMEX: HTM
- Industry: Renewable Energy
- Founded: 2000
- Headquarters: Boise, Idaho, United States
- Website: www.usgeothermal.com

U.S. Geothermal, Inc. was an independent geothermal energy company focused on the development, production and sale of electricity from geothermal energy, until its acquisition by Ormat Technologies in January 2018. The company operates three geothermal plants in the United States. located in Idaho, Oregon and Nevada, and is developing power plants in California, Nevada, Oregon as well as in Central America in the Republic of Guatemala.

== Existing operations ==
=== Neal Hot Springs ===
U.S. Geothermal's flagship project and Oregon's first commercial Geothermal power plant is Neal Hot Springs. It came online in November 2012.

Equity Partner: Enbridge (40%), $36 B Energy Pipeline Co.

Project Loan: Lender - U.S. Dept. of Energy, Fixed 2.6% APR, 22-year term, $61.8 M balance (2/29/16), 60% USG / 40% Enbridge.

Power Sales Contract: Idaho Power Company, 25-year term, Contract Average Energy Price $126.36 per megawatt-hour.

22 net MW (annual average): Air Cooled, 30 MW (winter), 14 MW (summer).

High Reliability: Availability 2015 average 97.9% (excluding schedule annual overhaul).

=== San Emidio Power Plant ===
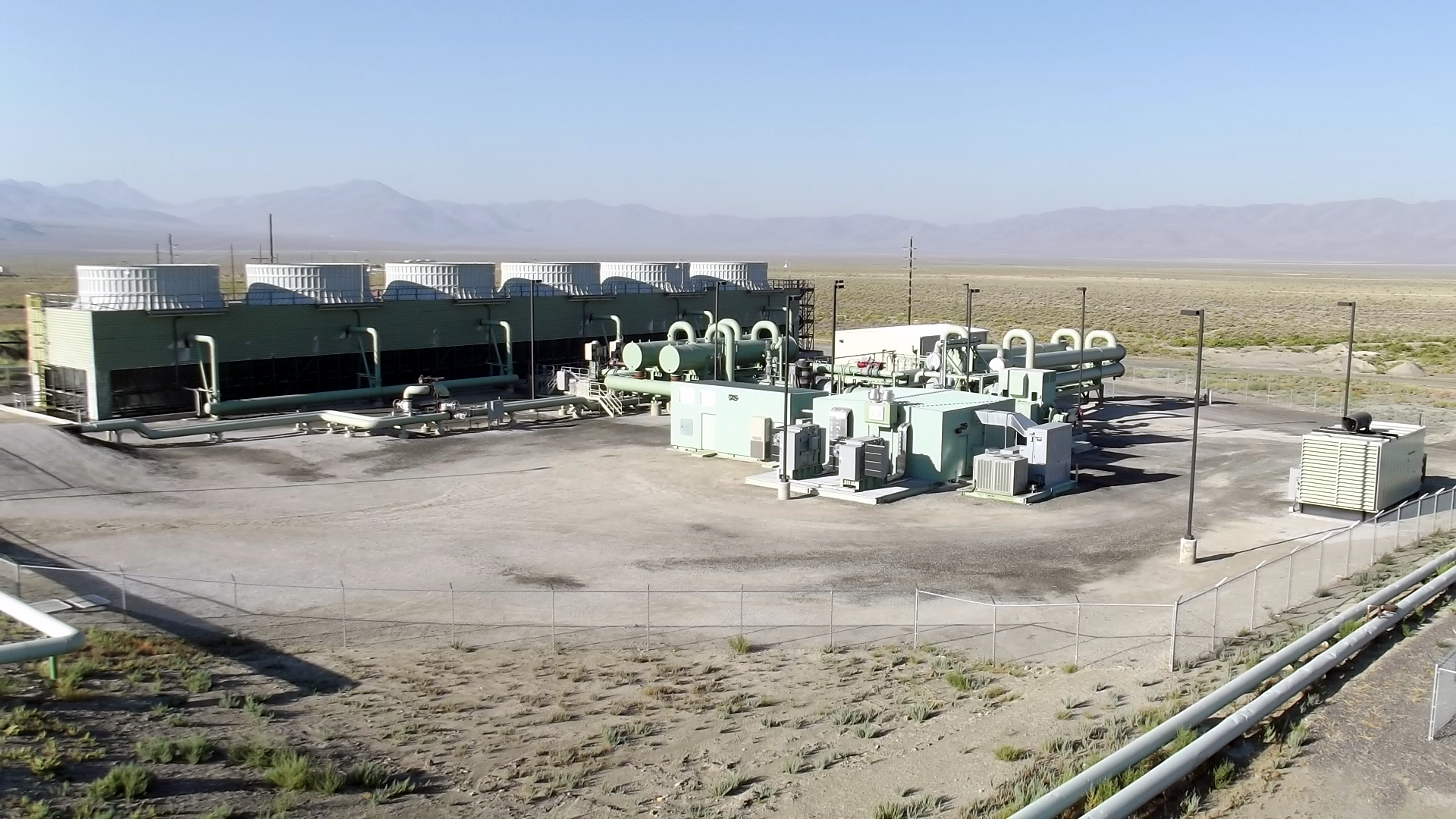
San Emidio Power Plant, Nevada

Near-Term expansion opportunity, went on-line in May 2012.

Equity Partner: None.

Project Loan: Lender - Prudential Insurance, Fixed 6.75% APR, 24-year term, $29.7 million balance (2/29/16).

Power Sales Contract: NV Energy, 25-year term, Contract Average Energy Price $103.52 per megawatt-hour.

10 net MW (annual average): Water Cooled.

High Reliability: Availability 2015 average 98.6% (excluding schedule annual overhaul).

=== Raft River Power Plant ===
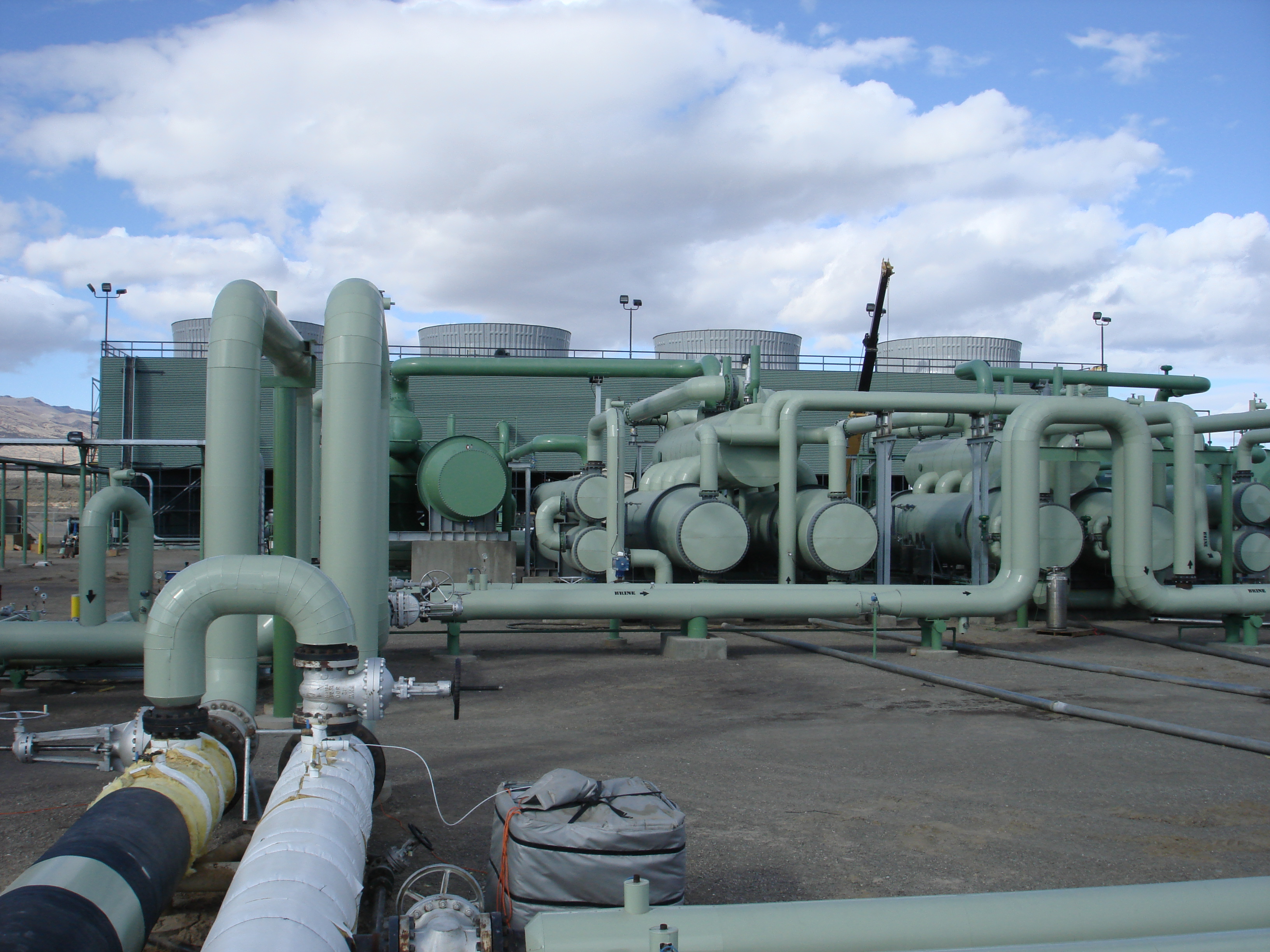
Raft River Power Plant, Idaho

Pacific Northwest and Idaho's first Geothermal power plant. It went on-line in January 2008.

Equity Partner: Goldman Sachs (5%), Tax equity ownership structure.

Project Loan: None.

Power Sales Contract: Idaho Power Company, 25-year term, Contract Average Energy Price $66.22 per megawatt-hour, Contract Average REC price $7.10.

13 net MW (annual average): Water Cooled, 10 MW current production.

High Reliability: Availability 2015 average 95.4% (excluding schedule annual overhaul)

== Development Projects ==
Advanced development projects near term expectations:

=== WGP Geysers Project - California ===
Expected plant size 30 MW net. Expected on-line date - 2018. Expected cost to build $150 M. Qualified for 30% investment tax credit. Status – 5 wells drilled with 30 MW of steam currently available for production.

=== El Ceibillo - Guatemala ===
Expected plant size 25 MW net. Expected on-line date (phase 1) - 2018. Expected cost to build (phase 1) $140 M. Qualified for 10 year income tax holiday. Status – production well drilling in progress.

=== San Emidio II - Nevada ===
Expected plant size 10 MW net. Expected on-line date (phase 2) - 2017. Expected cost to build (phase 2) $60 M. Qualified for 30% investment tax credit. Status – production well drilling in progress.

=== Crescent Valley - Nevada ===
Expected plant size (phase 1) 25 MW net. Expected on-line date (phase 1) - 2018. Expected cost to build (phase 1) $130 M. Qualified for 30% investment tax credit. Status – first well completed with additional drilling in planning.

== Key management ==
=== Dennis Gilles, CEO ===
Board Member U.S. Geothermal since 2011. Previous SVP of Calpine, prior experience at SCE/Mission and BP/ARCO. Engineer & MBA, 35 years energy management experience, 29 years in geothermal.

=== Doug Glaspey, President & COO ===
Co-founder of U.S. Geothermal, Engineer with 37 years in natural resource exploration, development and operation, including 13 years of geothermal experience.
