= Port of Morrow =

Port authority of Boardman, Oregon, United States

- Interactive map of Port of Morrow

Location
- Country: United States
- Location: Boardman, Oregon
- Coordinates: 45.852633°N 119.671972°W

Statistics
- Website www.portofmorrow.com

The Port of Morrow is the port authority in Boardman, a city in Morrow County, Oregon, United States, on the Columbia River.

== History ==
In 1958, Morrow County residents approved the creation of a port district by general election.

The first several years were spent establishing goals, objectives, policies, and organizing the Port. Beginning in 1963, the Port started acquiring industrial and harbor land, working with U.S. Corps of Engineers, local landowners, and the State of Oregon.

In the late 1960s, the first Port tenants began to arrive. A food processing industrial park was created in 1973 and was home to the Docken Bean Plant, Morrow County Produce Co., Desert Magic, and Gourmet Foods.

In 1981, the Kinzua Corporation and Longview Fiber constructed a dock for a wood chip reload facility. Sung Kiong Farms (SK Farms) built the grain terminal in 1983 to ship corn from Oregon and the Midwest to Pacific Rim countries. Also in 1983, a new freeway interchange was created to alleviate heavy traffic in Boardman, particularly during the potato harvest season. The new interchange provided easy access to the Boardman Industrial Park. In the mid-1980s, container activity began.

In 2022, the Oregon Department of Environmental Quality (DEQ) fined the Port of Morrow over $2.1 million, the second largest fine ever the Department of Environmental Quality has ever levied. The civil penalty notice shows the port failed to comply with the conditions of its wastewater permit intended to protect groundwater from nitrate contamination. Morrow County has declared a local state of emergency as a result of nitrogen-rich wastewater being over-applied onto agricultural fields.

In 2024, the Oregon Department of Environmental Quality (DEQ) fined the Port of Morrow $727,000 for 800 violations and again in 2025 for $11,700 for 6 violations. According to the DEQ, the Port of Morrow has violated the land application limits in its wastewater permit over 2,000 times between 2015 and 2025.

== SAGE Center ==
The SAGE (Sustainable AGriculture and Energy) Center is an interactive museum and visitor center constructed in 2013. It serves as an official Oregon Welcome Center that highlights sustainable agriculture and energy industries in the mid-Columbia Gorge region served by the Port of Morrow. The center provides hands-on exhibits that feature innovative technologies used by local industries and farmers to demonstrate how food gets from the farm to dinner tables around the world. Visitors can browse exhibits, enjoy Tillamook Ice Cream, and browse the gift shop for locally crafted merchandise. The SAGE Center offers free educational visits for schools.
