= Boardman, Oregon =

- City
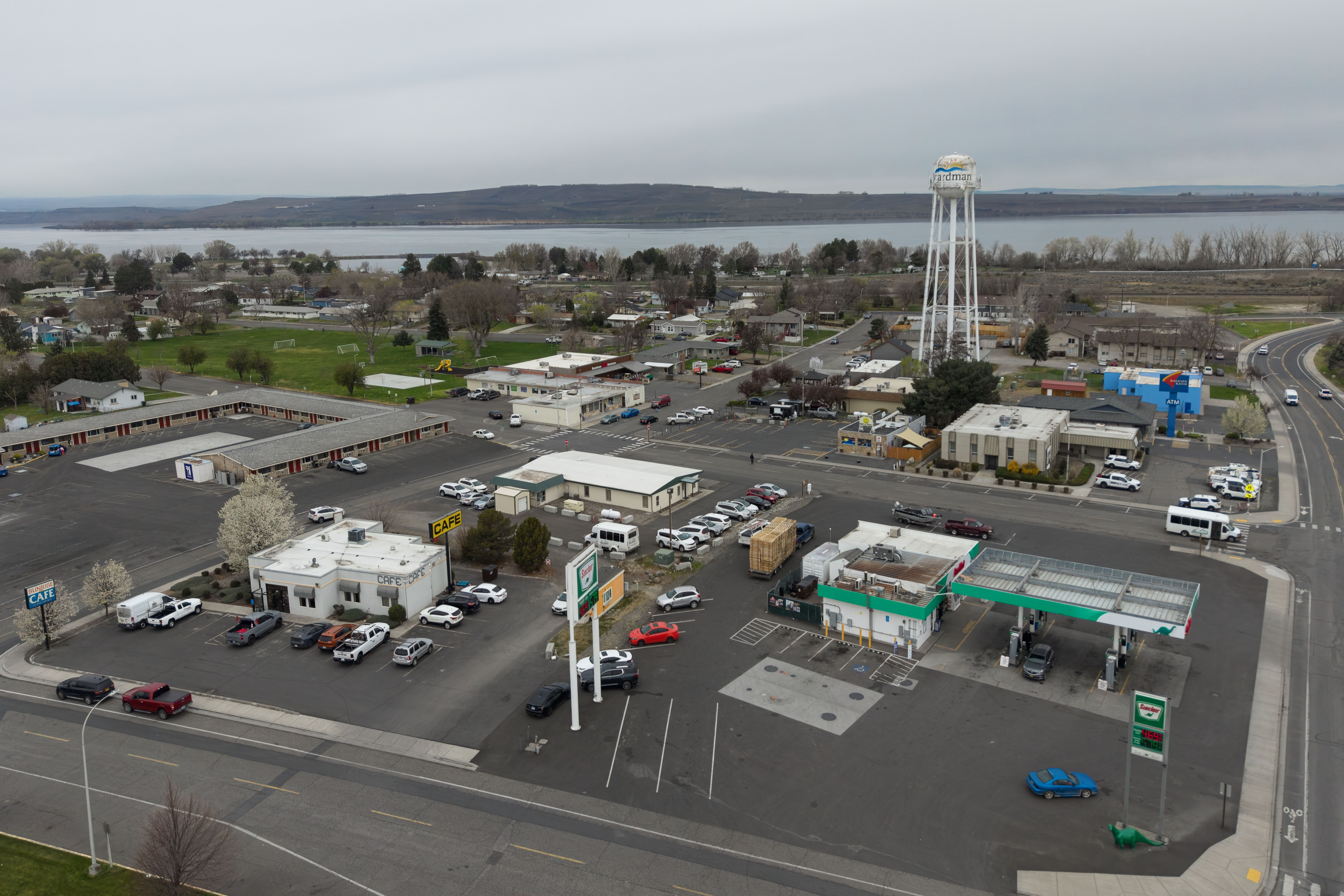
- Boardman (2026)
- Motto: On the river, on the way
- Location in Morrow County and Oregon
- Coordinates: 45°50′23″N 119°42′02″W
- Country: United States
- State: Oregon
- County: Morrow
- Incorporated: May 20, 1921

Government
  - Mayor: Sandy Toms

Area
  - Total: 4.43 sq mi (11.47 km^{2})
  - Land: 4.03 sq mi (10.43 km^{2})
  - Water: 0.40 sq mi (1.04 km^{2})
- Elevation: 308 ft (94 m)

Population (2020)
  - Total: 3,828
  - Density: 950.2/sq mi (366.86/km^{2})
- Time zone: UTC-8 (Pacific)
  - Summer (DST): UTC-7 (Pacific)
- ZIP code: 97818
- Area code: 541
- FIPS code: 41-07200
- GNIS feature ID: 1136082
- Website: www.cityofboardman.com

Boardman is a city in Morrow County, Oregon, United States, on the Columbia River and Interstate 84. As of the 2020 census the population was 3,828, up from 3,220 in 2010. It is the largest town in Morrow County.

== History ==
Boardman was homesteaded in 1903 by Samuel H. Boardman, the first superintendent of the Oregon State Parks System. Boardman and his wife worked for 13 years to develop irrigation for their land; during those years his wife taught school, and Boardman at times worked on railroad construction projects. The Union Pacific Railroad passed through Boardman, where it had a station. The community was platted in 1916 at about the same time Samuel Boardman went to work for the Oregon State Highway Department and became involved in the development of roadside parks.

The Boardman post office opened in 1916. The city was incorporated in 1921. South of Boardman, the U.S. Army Air Force established a training range in 1941. The Air Force transferred ownership of the range in 1960 to the U.S. Navy and it is now known as the Naval Weapons Systems Training Facility Boardman. The range is largely used by NAS Whidbey Island and the Oregon National Guard.

During construction of the John Day Dam on the Columbia River in the 1960s, the city had to be moved south, further from the waters of the planned Lake Umatilla. Boardman's tourist-oriented businesses were relocated first to serve Interstate 80N (now I-84), which had recently opened, on land that was released by the federal government. The filling of Lake Umatilla began in April 1968 and was completed later that year, completely inundating the old town. The new townsite cost $1.5 million to construct.

== Geography ==
Boardman is in northeastern Oregon, along Interstate 84 south of the Columbia River. The city is 308 feet (94 m) above sea level. It is 25 miles (40 km) west of Hermiston and 164 miles (264 km) east of Portland. According to the U.S. Census Bureau, the city has a total area of 4.43 square miles (11.47 km^{2}), of which 4.03 square miles (10.44 km^{2}) are land and 0.40 square miles (1.04 km^{2}), or 9.05%, are water in the Columbia River.

=== Climate ===
Boardman has a steppe climate (Köppen BSk).

Climate data for Boardman, Oregon, 1991–2020 normals, extremes 1971–present
Month	Jan	Feb	Mar	Apr	May	Jun	Jul	Aug	Sep	Oct	Nov	Dec	Year
Record high °F (°C)	70 (21)	74 (23)	80 (27)	92 (33)	102 (39)	113 (45)	110 (43)	107 (42)	100 (38)	90 (32)	76 (24)	73 (23)	113 (45)
Mean maximum °F (°C)	58.2 (14.6)	61.6 (16.4)	69.6 (20.9)	80.5 (26.9)	90.6 (32.6)	97.3 (36.3)	103.4 (39.7)	101.7 (38.7)	92.7 (33.7)	80.1 (26.7)	67.3 (19.6)	58.9 (14.9)	104.2 (40.1)
Mean daily maximum °F (°C)	42.0 (5.6)	48.3 (9.1)	57.6 (14.2)	66.1 (18.9)	75.2 (24.0)	81.7 (27.6)	91.3 (32.9)	90.0 (32.2)	80.6 (27.0)	65.8 (18.8)	51.0 (10.6)	41.6 (5.3)	65.9 (18.9)
Daily mean °F (°C)	35.3 (1.8)	38.9 (3.8)	45.7 (7.6)	53.0 (11.7)	61.5 (16.4)	68.1 (20.1)	75.7 (24.3)	74.3 (23.5)	65.2 (18.4)	53.1 (11.7)	42.1 (5.6)	35.4 (1.9)	54.0 (12.2)
Mean daily minimum °F (°C)	28.7 (−1.8)	29.5 (−1.4)	33.8 (1.0)	39.8 (4.3)	47.8 (8.8)	54.6 (12.6)	60.0 (15.6)	58.7 (14.8)	49.7 (9.8)	40.3 (4.6)	33.2 (0.7)	29.1 (−1.6)	42.1 (5.6)
Mean minimum °F (°C)	12.0 (−11.1)	14.8 (−9.6)	21.4 (−5.9)	28.3 (−2.1)	34.7 (1.5)	44.2 (6.8)	49.1 (9.5)	47.4 (8.6)	38.3 (3.5)	26.1 (−3.3)	18.3 (−7.6)	14.0 (−10.0)	5.4 (−14.8)
Record low °F (°C)	−13 (−25)	−13 (−25)	2 (−17)	21 (−6)	29 (−2)	35 (2)	37 (3)	39 (4)	25 (−4)	11 (−12)	−9 (−23)	−15 (−26)	−15 (−26)
Average precipitation inches (mm)	1.28 (33)	0.92 (23)	0.70 (18)	0.64 (16)	0.80 (20)	0.55 (14)	0.14 (3.6)	0.18 (4.6)	0.25 (6.4)	0.74 (19)	0.98 (25)	1.38 (35)	8.56 (217.6)
Average snowfall inches (cm)	1.2 (3.0)	1.4 (3.6)	0.2 (0.51)	0.0 (0.0)	0.0 (0.0)	0.0 (0.0)	0.0 (0.0)	0.0 (0.0)	0.0 (0.0)	0.1 (0.25)	0.0 (0.0)	0.8 (2.0)	3.7 (9.36)
Average precipitation days (≥ 0.01 in)	8.8	6.3	6.3	4.9	5.1	3.4	1.1	1.6	2.1	5.1	7.4	9.9	62.0
Average snowy days (≥ 0.1 in)	0.5	0.5	0.2	0.0	0.0	0.0	0.0	0.0	0.0	0.0	0.0	1.2	2.4
Source 1: NOAA
Source 2: National Weather Service

== Demographics ==
Historical population
Census	Pop.	Note	%±
1920	113		—
1930	100		−11.5%
1940	110		10.0%
1950	120		9.1%
1960	153		27.5%
1970	192		25.5%
1980	1,261		556.8%
1990	1,387		10.0%
2000	2,855		105.8%
2010	3,220		12.8%
2020	3,828		18.9%

Boardman is part of the Pendleton–Hermiston Micropolitan Statistical Area.

=== 2020 census ===
As of the 2020 census, Boardman had a population of 3,828. The median age was 27.6 years. 34.2% of residents were under the age of 18 and 6.4% of residents were 65 years of age or older. For every 100 females there were 109.9 males, and for every 100 females age 18 and over there were 113.8 males age 18 and over.

0% of residents lived in urban areas, while 100.0% lived in rural areas.

There were 1,162 households in Boardman, of which 51.8% had children under the age of 18 living in them. Of all households, 44.4% were married-couple households, 22.3% were households with a male householder and no spouse or partner present, and 23.8% were households with a female householder and no spouse or partner present. About 19.8% of all households were made up of individuals and 5.7% had someone living alone who was 65 years of age or older.

There were 1,282 housing units, of which 9.4% were vacant. Among occupied housing units, 57.8% were owner-occupied and 42.2% were renter-occupied. The homeowner vacancy rate was 0.4% and the rental vacancy rate was 13.9%.

Racial composition as of the 2020 census
Race	Number	Percent
White	1,390	36.3%
Black or African American	27	0.7%
American Indian and Alaska Native	72	1.9%
Asian	7	0.2%
Native Hawaiian and Other Pacific Islander	0	0%
Some other race	1,597	41.7%
Two or more races	735	19.2%
Hispanic or Latino (of any race)	2,813	73.5%

=== 2010 census ===
As of the census of 2010, there were 3,220 people, 964 households, and 759 families residing in the city. The population density was 849.6 inhabitants per square mile (328.0/km^{2}). There were 1,017 housing units at an average density of 268.3 per square mile (103.6/km^{2}). The racial makeup of the city was 60.1% White, 0.7% African American, 0.9% Native American, 2.4% Asian, 0.3% Pacific Islander, 33.0% from other races, and 2.6% from two or more races. Hispanic or Latino of any race were 61.7% of the population.

There were 964 households, of which 53.2% had children under the age of 18 living with them, 54.9% were married couples living together, 14.7% had a female householder with no husband present, 9.1% had a male householder with no wife present, and 21.3% were non-families. 14.7% of all households were made up of individuals, and 3.9% had someone living alone who was 65 years of age or older. The average household size was 3.34, and the average family size was 3.70.

The median age in the city was 27.5 years. 35.1% of residents were under the age of 18; 11.4% were between the ages of 18 and 24; 28.9% were from 25 to 44; 18.8% were from 45 to 64; and 5.8% were 65 years of age or older. The gender makeup of the city was 53.3% male and 46.7% female.

=== 2000 census ===
As of the census of 2000, there were 2,855 people, 853 households, and 686 families residing in the town. The population density was 798.2 inhabitants per square mile (308.2/km^{2}). There were 947 housing units at an average density of 264.8 per square mile (102.2/km^{2}). The racial makeup of the town was 55.24% White,1.93% Native American, 0.70% Asian, 0.39% African American, 0.11% Pacific Islander, 38.74% from other races, and 2.91% from two or more races. Hispanic or Latino of any race were 50.12% of the population.

There were 853 households, out of which 53.0% had children under the age of 18 living with them, 57.4% were married couples living together, 14.4% had a female householder with no husband present, and 19.5% were non-families. 14.7% of all households were made up of individuals, and 4.0% had someone living alone who was 65 years of age or older. The average household size was 3.33, and the average family size was 3.66.

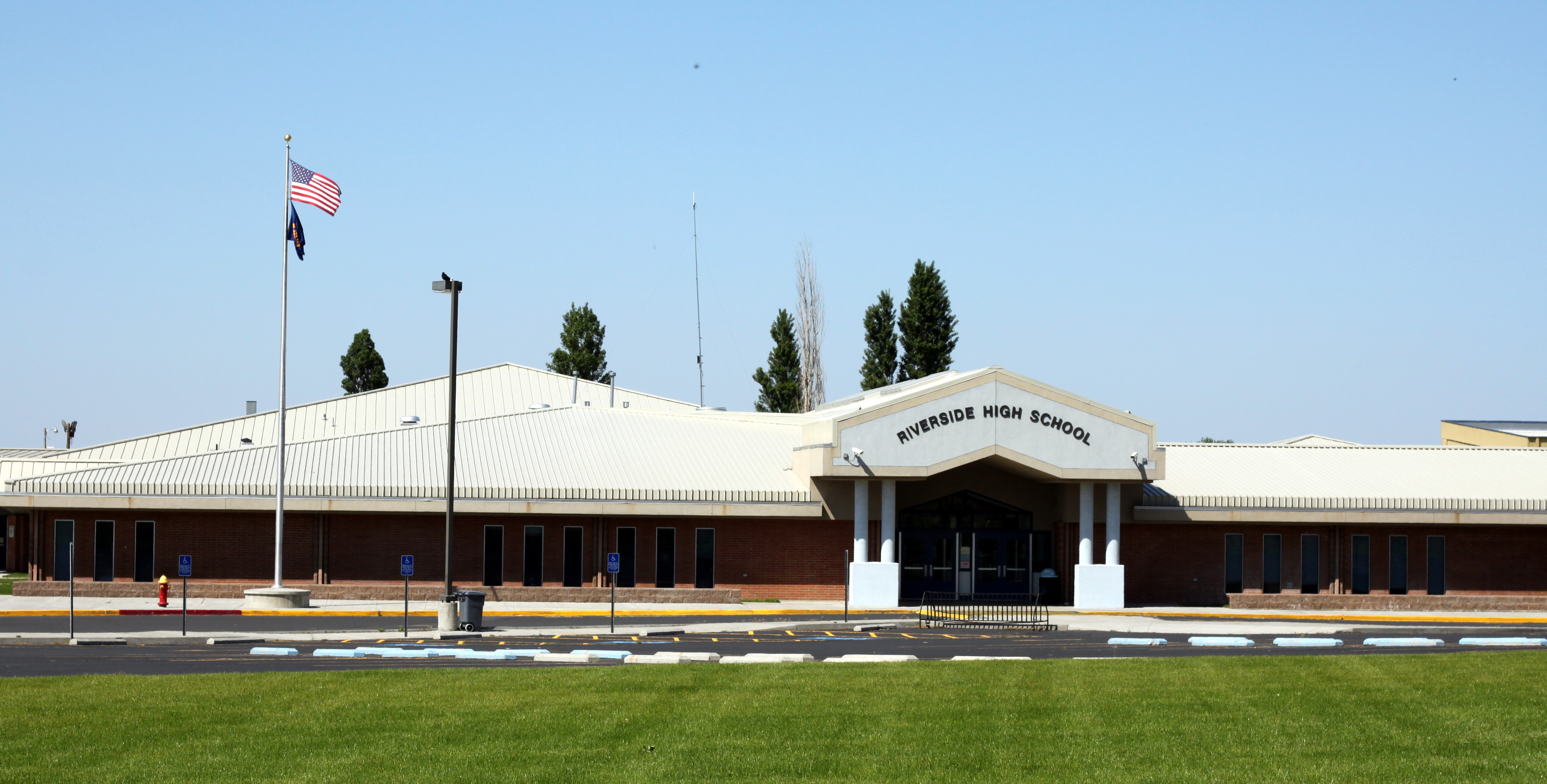
Riverside High School

In the town the population was spread out, with 38.1% under the age of 18, 11.0% from 18 to 24, 30.5% from 25 to 44, 15.0% from 45 to 64, and 5.3% who were 65 years of age or older. The median age was 25 years. For every 100 females, there were 109.9 males. For every 100 females age 18 and over, there were 114.8 males.

The median household income was $32,105, and the median income for a family was $32,543. Males had a median income of $30,000 versus $21,765 for females. The per capita income for the town was $12,297. About 16.3% of families and 20.1% of the population were below the poverty line, including 26.2% of those under age 18 and 6.7% of those age 65 or over.

== Economy ==
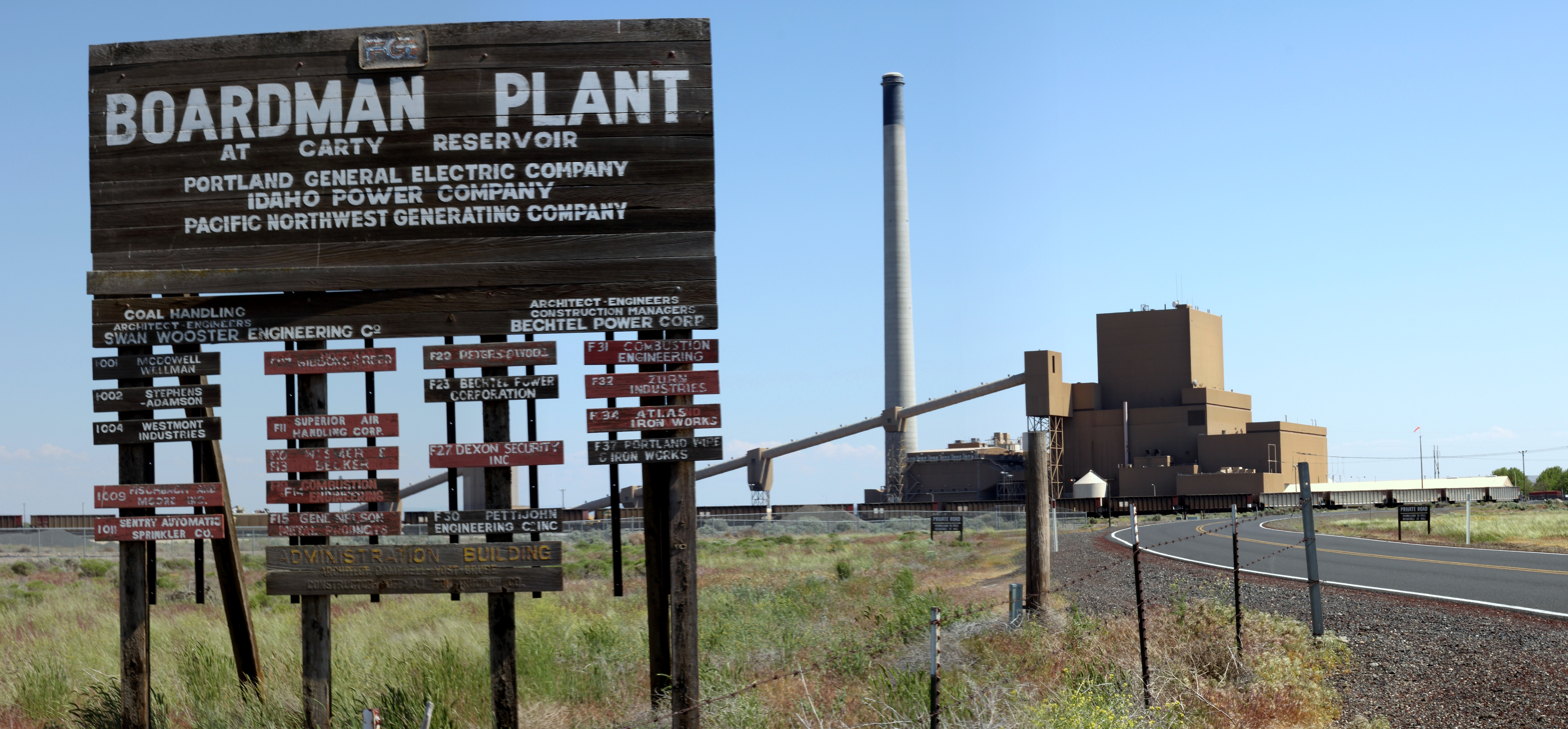
Coal plant outside of Boardman

As of 2013, the six largest employers in Boardman are Lamb Weston (potato products) (370 employees); Oregon Potato Company (125); Portland General Electric (PGE) (113); the Morrow County School District (106), and Boardman Foods (100).

The Port of Morrow, Oregon's second-largest port, is adjacent to the city and located on the Columbia riverfront. The port property also includes two PGE gas-fired power plants. PGE also had a coal-fired power plant, the Boardman Coal Plant, which opened in 1980 and shut down in October 2020, marking the closure of the last coal-fired power plant in Oregon after 40 years of service. The Boardman Coal Plant was demolished in 2022. The plant had produced power at a rate of 550 megawatts and was the largest single point of emission of greenhouse gases in Oregon. The Umatilla Chemical Depot, which includes the Umatilla Chemical Agent Disposal Facility, is 10 miles (16 km) east of the city, northwest of the intersection of I-84 and Interstate 82. The Irrigon Fish Hatchery is 7 miles (11 km) east of Boardman. Threemile Canyon Farms is the largest farm located in Boardman.

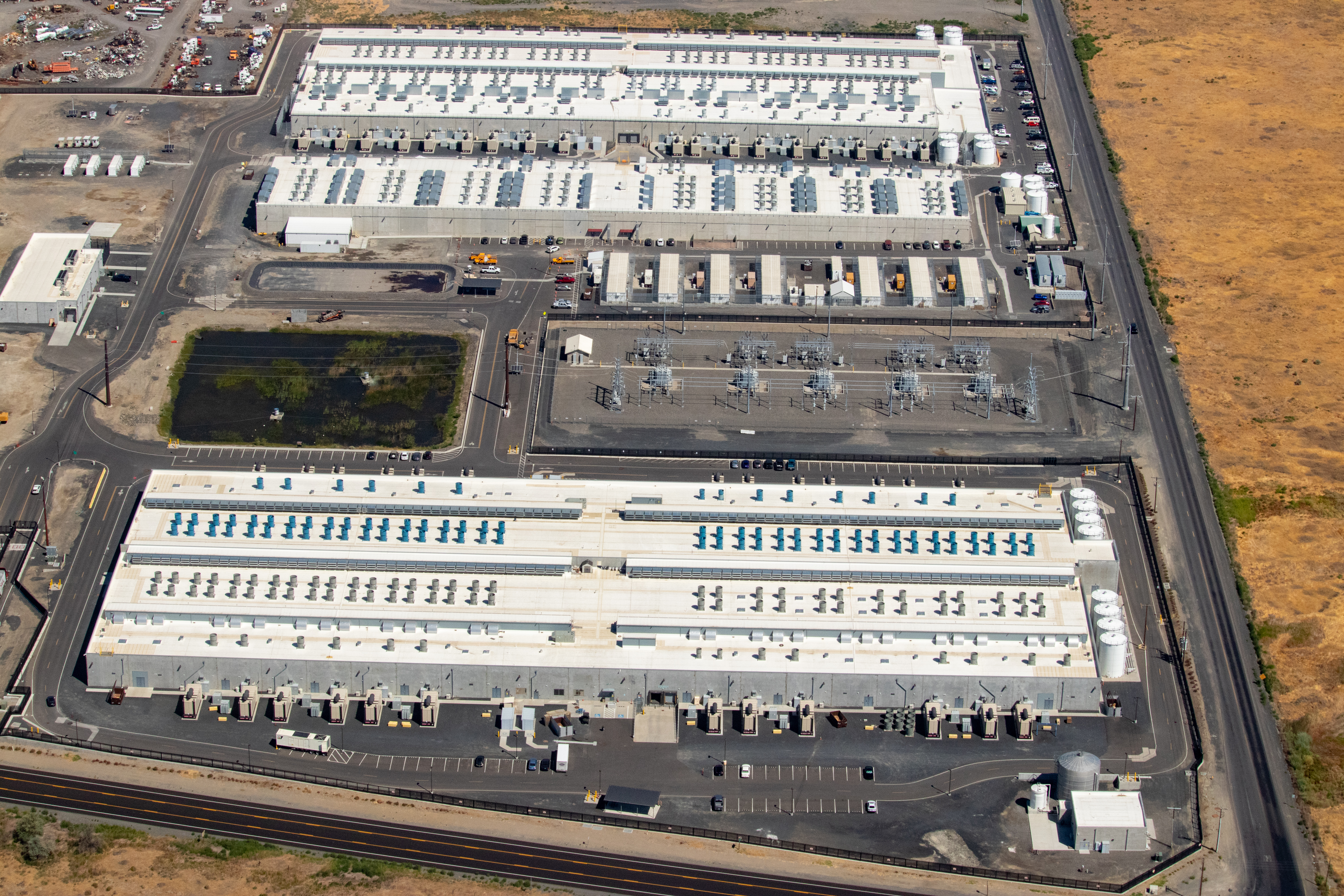
Part of AWS's datacenters in Umatilla/Boardman

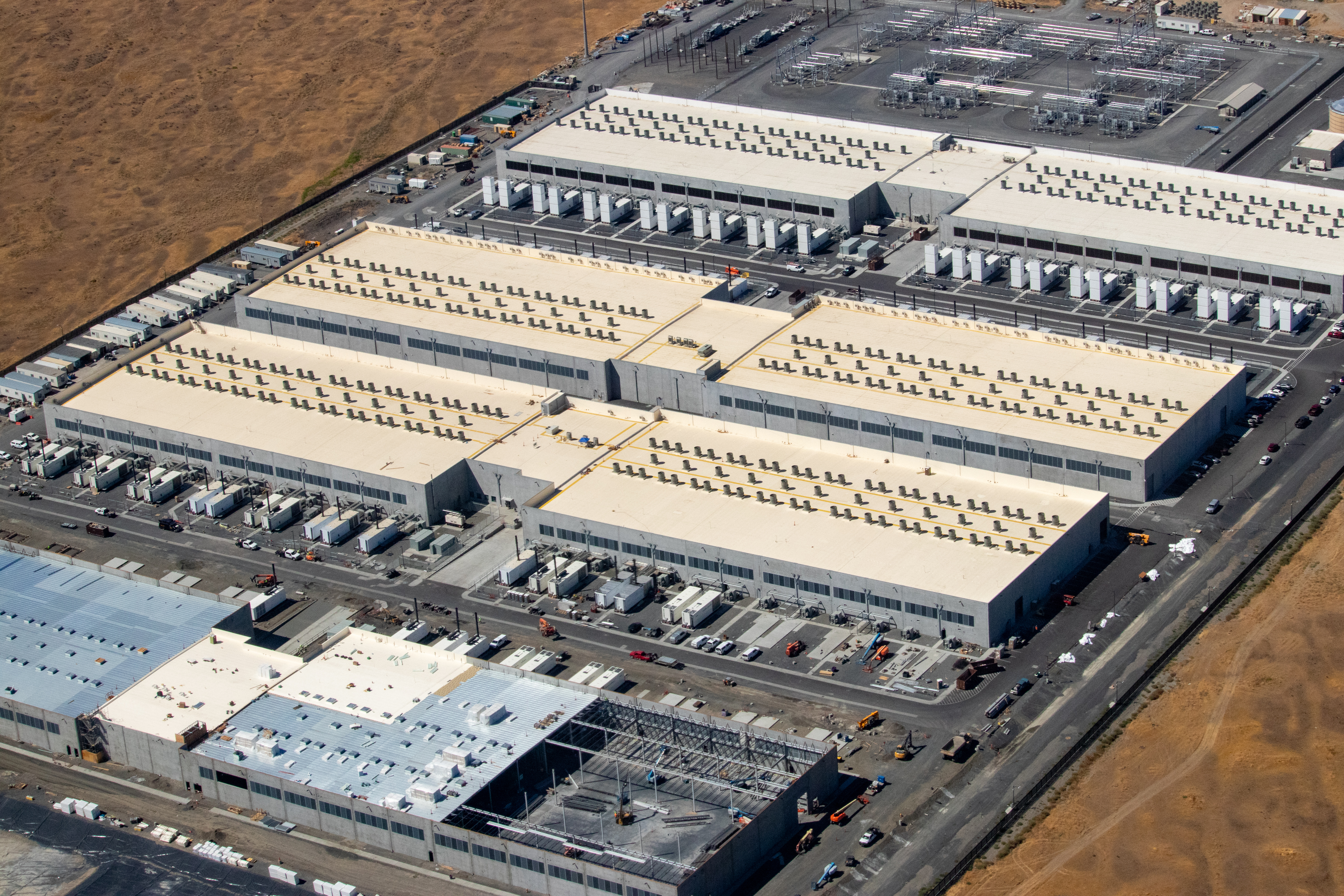
Part of AWS's datacenters in Umatilla/Boardman, showing three datacenters with a fourth under construction

The Oregonian reported in November 2008 that Amazon was building a large data center at the 9,000-acre (36 km^{2}) Port of Morrow. The data center was to have a dedicated 10-megawatt electrical substation. A website focused on data centers suggested the Boardman site was created in response to the rapid growth of Amazon Web Services; earlier in 2008, Amazon had announced that Amazon S3 was storing 29 billion objects (such as IMDb tables). The Amazon data center at the Port of Morrow began operating in 2011 as one of three Amazon data centers in the region at the time. The project made Boardman the second Oregon city along the Columbia River to host a power-hungry data center for web services; Google already had a similar center in The Dalles. By 2012, Apple had announced plans for a server farm south of The Dalles in Prineville, where Facebook already had a similar farm. Rackspace was said to be considering a data center at the Port of Morrow. According to an August 2018 article in the East Oregonian, Amazon has two data centers in Boardman and one in Umatilla and is proposing to build four more data centers in the region. The three data centers in Boardman and Umatilla correspond to the three availability zones in AWS US-West-2 (Oregon) region.

Since 2007, Alto Ingredients, formerly known as Pacific Ethanol, has operated an ethanol plant in Boardman. It can produce up to 40 million US gallons (150,000,000 L) of ethanol a year from grains. ZeaChem has built a demonstration biorefinery at the Port of Morrow with a capacity of up to 250,000 US gallons (950,000 L) of ethanol a year from wood waste. The company hopes to build a much larger commercial refinery with a capacity of 25 million US gallons (95,000,000 L) annually. However, in April 2013, less than a month after start-up at the demonstration plant, ZeaChem halted production, citing funding problems. The company plans to resume production if financial backing can be found.

=== Coal export ===
Ambre Energy, a company based in Australia, proposed in 2011 to use the Port of Morrow as a transfer point for shipping U.S. coal to Asia. Ambre wants to export up to 8.8 million short tons (8,000,000 t) of coal per year from the Powder River Basin in Wyoming and Montana. It would ship the coal by train to Boardman, where it would be loaded on barges and hauled down the Columbia River to the Port of St. Helens. There it would be transferred to ocean-going ships headed for China, South Korea, Japan, and other Asian countries.

The Ambre plan generated controversy among proponents touting economic benefits and opponents fearing environmental damage. In 2014, the Oregon Department of State Lands denied the company a necessary permit for the project, and the company abandoned the coal shipping proposal in 2016.

== Transportation ==
Boardman Airport, owned by the Port of Morrow, is 4 miles (6.4 km) southwest of the city. It is a public airport used mainly for transient and local general aviation. Midcolumbia Bus Company are also in the Boardman area.
