= Taylor Spencer =

Daniel Taylor Spencer (died October 1874) was a pioneer and businessman that settled in present-day Ruggs, Oregon and Heppner, Oregon.

== Biography ==
In 1872, Spencer (variant Spenser) established a store at the site of the present Rhea creek bridge in Ruggs on the Heppner-Hardman road. Spencer's decision to open a store at the location reportedly almost influenced Henry Heppner and Colonel (Col.) Jackson Lee Morrow to open a store there, too. However, Heppner and Morrow decided to open their store on Willow Creek north of Ruggs in present-day Heppner in 1873. Spencer moved his store to Heppner in the summer of 1873, creating the second store in Heppner and contributing to what would become a growing trading post in eastern Oregon. Spencer reportedly died in October 1874 leaving behind a widow and his store.
