= Heppner Hotel =

- U.S. National Register of Historic Places
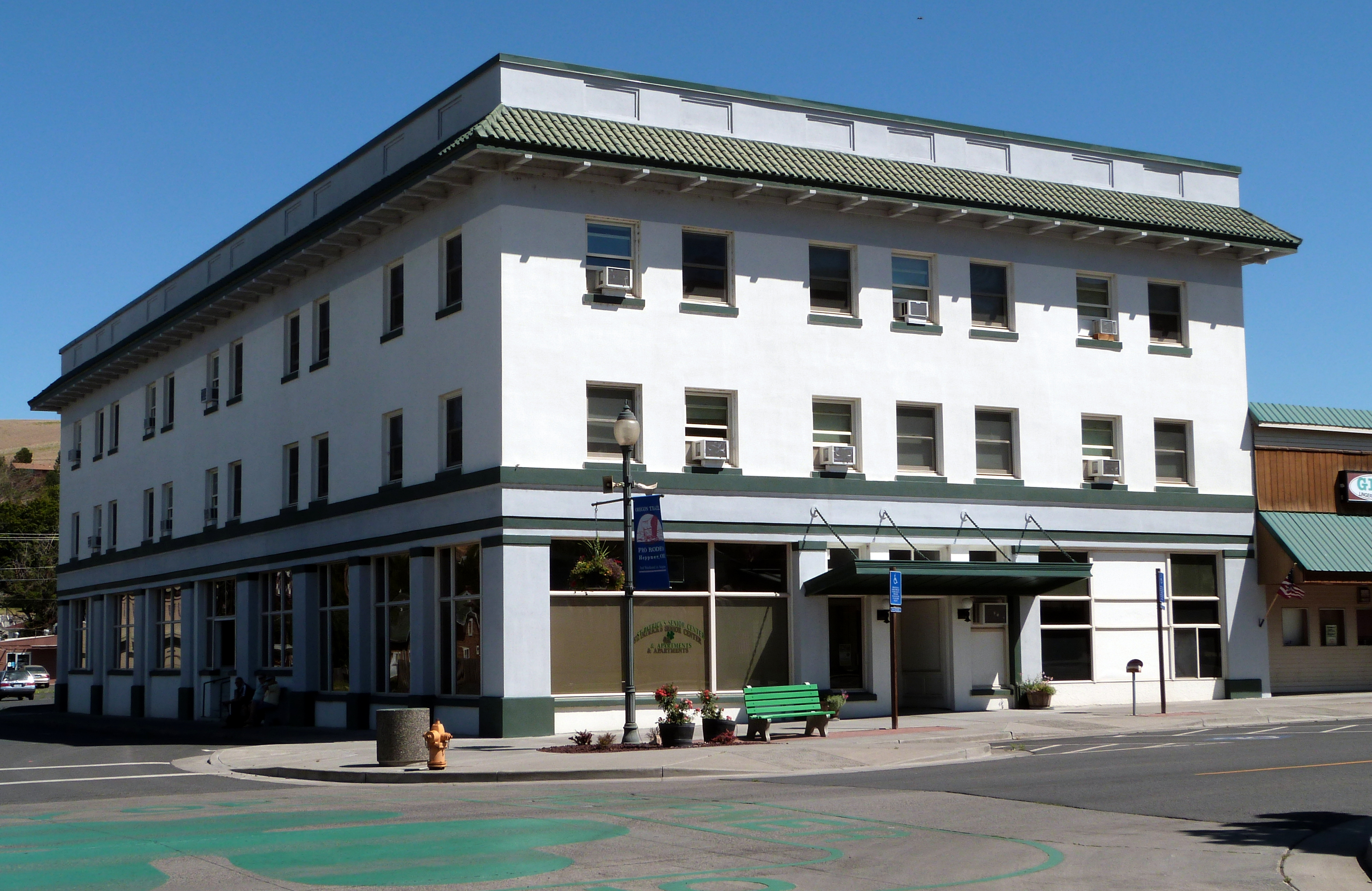
- Exterior in 2012

- Location within Oregon Location within the United States
- Location: 190 N. Main St., Heppner, Oregon
- Coordinates: 45°21′13.15″N 119°33′11.87″W
- Area: Less than 1 acre (0.40 ha)
- Built: 1919
- Built by: Lou Traver
- Architect: John V. Bennes
- Architectural style: Mediterranean Revival
- NRHP reference No.: 82001511
- Added to NRHP: October 29, 1982

The Heppner Hotel is a building in Heppner, in the U.S. state of Oregon. Designed by architect John V. Bennes and built in 1919, it was added to the National Register of Historic Places in 1982.

When it opened in 1920, the 48-room hostelry was the city's only hotel. A flash flood along Willow Creek destroyed one former hotel in 1903, and fire destroyed the other in 1918. Originally named the Hotel St. Patrick, it was soon renamed the Heppner Hotel.

Measuring 62 by 126 feet (19 by 38 m) at ground level, the hotel covers nearly all of the downtown lot on which it rests. As of 1982, it was the largest and tallest commercial structure in the city.

The three-story building is made of hollow clay tile and concrete with stucco facades and frameless windows. The west facade of the ground floor had a narrow central bay for the main entrance, and it was flanked by structural bays and bay windows opening on interior commercial space. The architecturally plain hotel had little exterior or interior decoration; however, the rooms on the second and third floors were capacious, and three-fourths of them had private baths.

== See also ==
- National Register of Historic Places listings in Morrow County, Oregon
