= Beth Israel Cemetery (Portland, Oregon) =

Jewish cemetery in Portland, Oregon, U.S.

Coordinates: 45.4621866°N 122.6837110°W

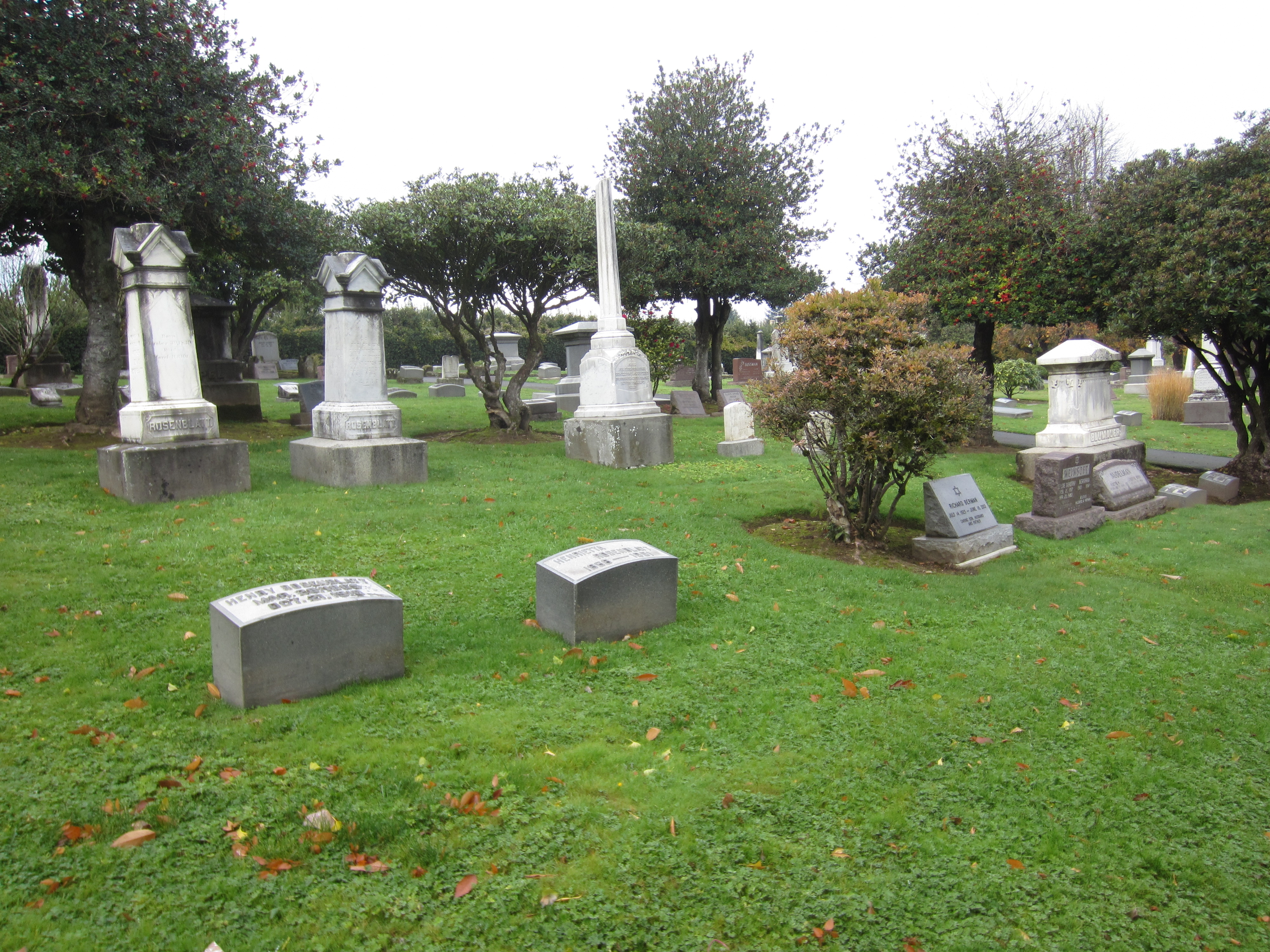
- The cemetery in 2017

Details
- Location: Portland, Oregon
- Country: United States

Beth Israel Cemetery is a Jewish cemetery in southwest Portland, Oregon, United States. It has the distinction of being the oldest continually running Jewish cemetery in the country.

== Notable burials ==
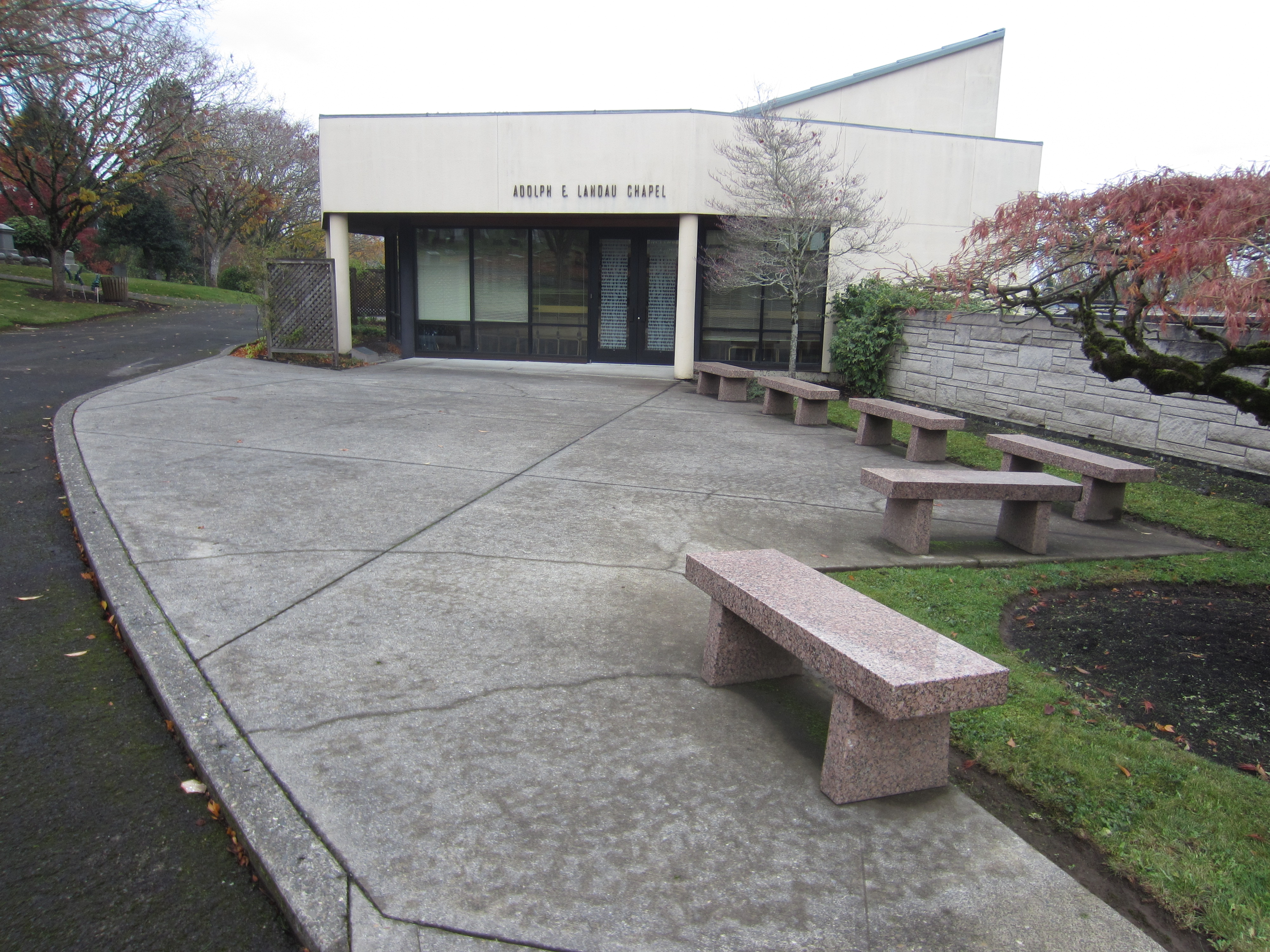
The chapel's exterior, 2017

- Caroline Burke (1913–1964), actress, theater producer, and art collector
- Henry Heppner (c. 1831–1905) Businessman and namesake for Heppner, Oregon.
- Solomon Hirsch (1839–1902), community leader
- Julius Meier (1874–1937), Governor of Oregon
- Maurine Neuberger (1907–2000), US Senator
- Richard L. Neuberger (1912–1960), US Senator and author
- Joseph Simon (1851–1935), US Senator

== See also ==
- Beth Israel School
- Congregation Beth Israel (Portland, Oregon)
