= Ruggs, Oregon =

Unincorporated community in the state of Oregon, United States

- Unincorporated community
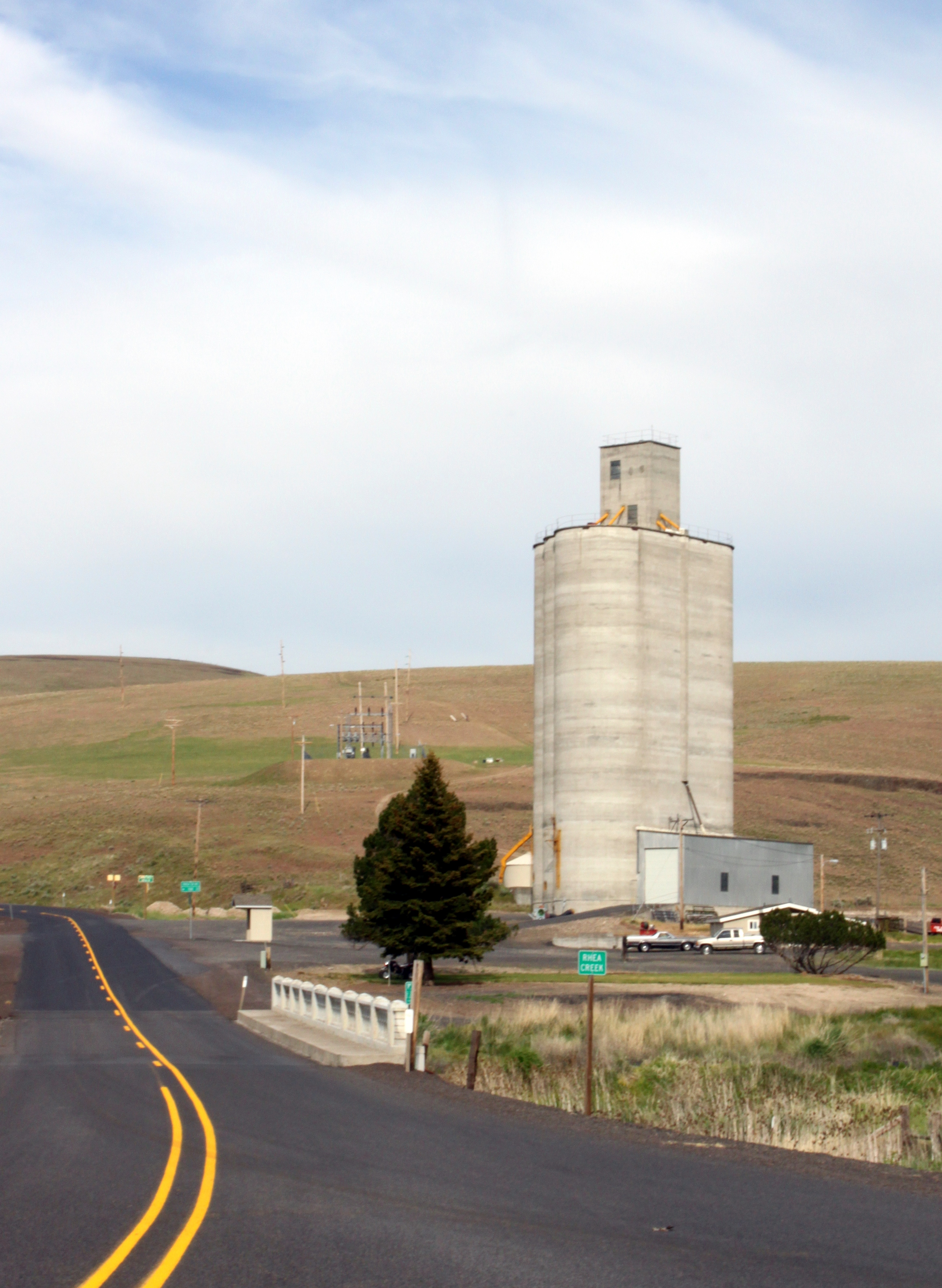
- Grain elevator along Oregon Route 206 in Ruggs

- Location within Oregon Location within the United States
- Coordinates: 45°15′48″N 119°41′12″W
- Country: United States
- State: Oregon
- County: Morrow
- Elevation: 2,136 ft (651 m)
- Time zone: UTC-8 (Pacific (PST))
  - Summer (DST): UTC-7 (PDT)
- ZIP code: 97836
- Area codes: 458 and 541
- GNIS feature ID: 1126358

Ruggs is an unincorporated community located in the southern portion of Morrow County, Oregon, United States. Ruggs lies at the junction of Oregon Route 206, Oregon Route 207, Rhea Creek Road, and Upper Rhea Creek Road. The community is situated at an elevation of 2,136 feet (651 m).

The community is named after Edward E. Rugg Jr., one of many in the Rugg family who were prominent farmers and ranchers in the area starting in the early 1900s. Ruggs also at times has been referred to as "Ruggs Junction" or "Ruggs District."

== History ==
=== Geologic ===
Ruggs' geologic history echoes that of other areas in the region. Ruggs is geologically situated within the Columbia Basin, a region overlain with loess soils and rugged basaltic foothills that were the product of glacial floods and Columbia River Basalt Group lava flows. Basalt is the major bedrock underlying the canyons and plateaus surrounding Ruggs.

Ruggs is situated close to where the Columbia Basin and Blue Mountain ecological provinces end and begin, respectively. The Columbia Basin Ecological Province is mainly a hilly upland that slopes up from north to south and that is dissected by numerous dendritic-pattern drainages. This ecological region is further subdivided into the northern ancient lake basin and the southern silty uplands. Soils in the area typically consist Bakeoven-Morrow complex, Lickskillet stony loam, Lickskillet-Rock outcrop, Morrow silt loam, and Onyx silt loam. The Columbia Basin Ecological Province merges with the Blue Mountain Ecological Province close to an elevation of around 3,500 feet (1,067 m).

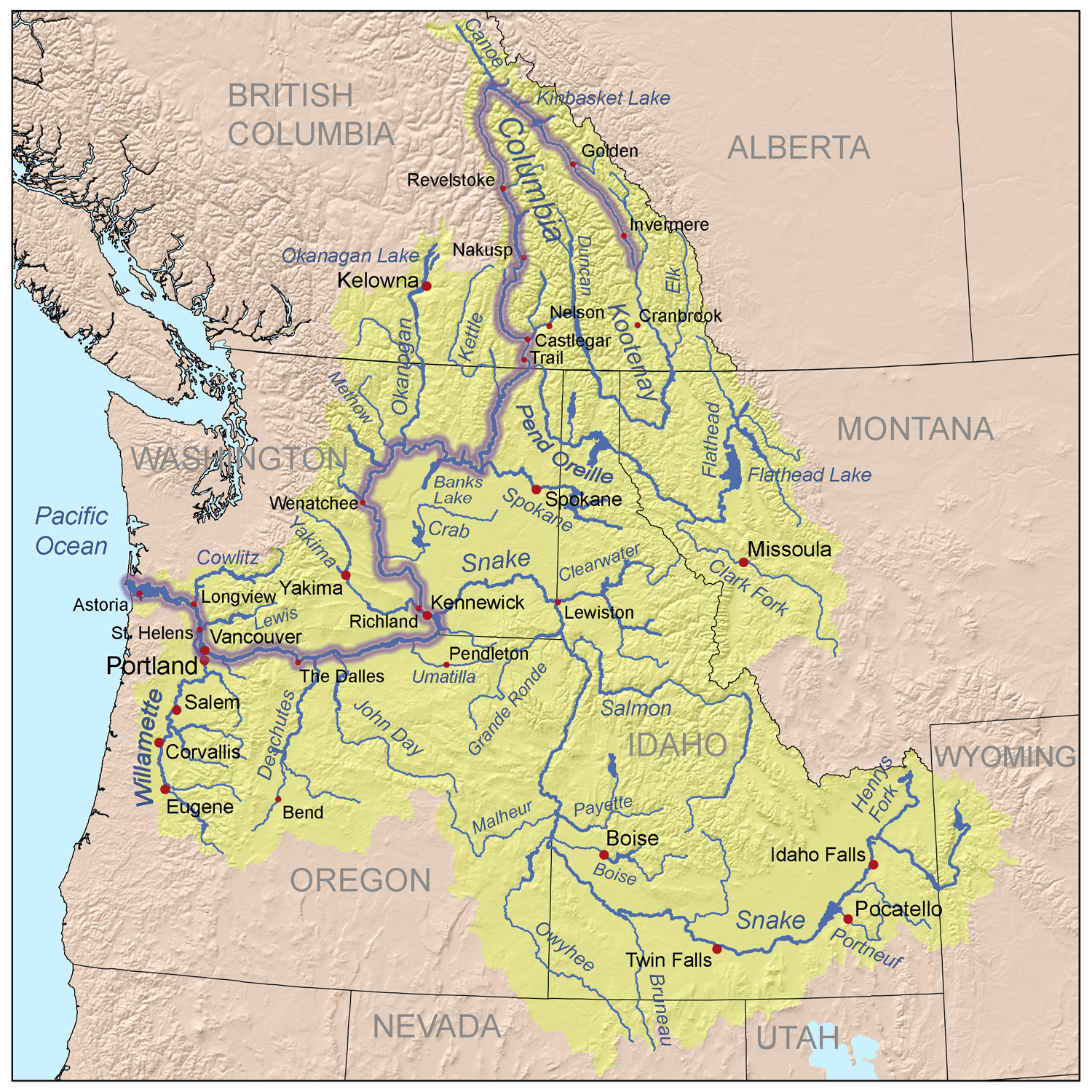
Columbia Basin.

=== Native Americans ===
Ruggs served as part of a broader area where local Native American tribes seasonally inhabited. Native Americans lived and traveled between the Columbia Gorge and the Blue Mountains for more than 10,000 years prior to European-American settlement. Local newspapers record visits between local Native Americans and settlers in the present-day Ruggs area in the late 1800s, including a visit by Hin-mah-too-yah-lat-kekt (Chief Joseph) of the Wal-lam-wat-kain (Wallowa) band of Nez Perce. "Old Blind Jim" and his small tribe known as the Columbia River Renegades frequented the area. Jim was of royal Columbia tribe heritage and his tribe fished salmon and hunted berries, elk, bear, and other wild game in the Blue Mountains during summer.

=== Pioneer Settlement ===
The Rhea and Wright families settled in the area in 1864 and 1873, respectively. The Elijah W. Rhea family lived on Rhea creek approximately 12 miles upstream from the confluence of Rhea and Willow creeks. The Albert Wright family settled further upstream on Rhea Creek. Local history and newspaper records indicate that Daniel Taylor Spencer established a store here in 1872. That store, however, was eventually relocated to nearby Heppner in 1873. Orin E. Farnsworth arrived to the area circa 1874 and settled in a nearby area known as "Midway."

=== The Rugg Family ===
==== North Dakota ====
The community is named after Edward E. Rugg, Jr. Rugg Jr. was born 5 January 1880 in Mason City, Iowa.

Edward E. Rugg Sr. and Lilla Rugg, Rugg Jr's mother and father, gained local prominence in North Dakota where they farmed and helped organize the Nekoma Farmers Grain and Fuel Company in Nekoma, North Dakota in 1909. In March 1911, Rugg Sr. and his family moved to a farm near Hood River, Oregon from Easby, North Dakota. Tax records, however, suggest that the family had connections to eastern Oregon a few years prior to moving.

==== Oregon ====
Rugg Sr. and his family initially settled on a five-acre tract near Hood River. Soon thereafter they purchased 40 acres at Booth’s Hill. In October 1912, the family sold a ten-acre tract of land to Hall Roberts, a wealthy farmer from Cheyenne, North Dakota. Roberts officially took control of the property two months later in December 1912. In mid-1913, a local newspaper in Hood River records the family traveling to and from Hood River and Heppner. On December 11, 1913, the same local Hood River newspaper published that the Rugg family made the final move to Heppner.

In 1914, the Rugg family began making a name for itself managing, farming, and ranching property southwest of Heppner, Oregon. The family helped found and lead some of Morrow County's war support and agricultural groups, including the Victory Loan Organization, the Morrow County Farm Bureau (MCFB), the MCFB's Livestock Improvement committee, the Morrow County Fair Association, the Morrow County Irrigation District, the Morrow County Woolgrowers’ Association, and the Women's Auxiliary of the Morrow County Woolgrowers’ Association.

== Geography ==
Ruggs is approximately 7 miles (11 km.) east of Eightmile and 11 miles (18 km.) southwest of Heppner in southern Morrow County, Oregon The community is part of the Pendleton–Hermiston Micropolitan Statistical Area. Ruggs is located in the Columbia Plateau ecoregion of eastern Oregon. This ecoregion is an arid, sagebrush steppe and grassland underlain by basalt up to two miles thick. Loess soils once supported bunchgrass prairies but are now widely cultivated for winter wheat.

Areas with thick loess deposits are typically dry farmed with winter wheat or irrigated alfalfa and barley. Rangeland dominates in more rugged areas with thinner loess deposits. Mean annual precipitation is 9 to 15 inches and increases with increasing elevation. Scablands, composed of arrays of earth mounds surrounded by rock polygons, are relics of Pleistocene glacial periods.

Ruggs lies along Rhea Creek, a tributary of Willow Creek in the Blue Mountains east of the Cascades. These creeks eventually converge and flow north into the Columbia Gorge at Heppner Junction, a Union Pacific station located on the left bank at the mouth of Willow Creek at Columbia River Mile (RM) 252.

== Government ==
=== Postal Service ===
Newspaper records suggest that the Ruggs area at one point had its own post office known as "Midway" on the aforementioned Wright family's property.

=== Elected Officials ===
Ruggs has no elected officials. In 1963, however, local press reported that a letter was addressed to the “Mayor of Ruggs” and subsequently delivered to Mary Wright of the community. This article stated that the event "rather nonplussed Mary in the unincorporated little village [and] she called Doris Ball and asked if they should hold an election. They decided that Mary should go ahead and take care of the letter, which indicates that if an election were held at Ruggs, she might win the mayoralty." The report noted that the letter arrived in Ruggs from a student interested in the history of the area and "Mrs. Wright—the 'one-woman Chamber of Commerce'—sent a booklet on the county and wrote all the dope about Ruggs."

== Education ==
Records as early as 1926 show that the Golden West School existed at Ruggs. The school was located alongside the Rhea Creek Grange Hall.

== Attractions ==
=== Hunting ===
Location hunting includes Ruggs Ranch, a wild bird and big game hunting outfitter.

=== Ornithology ===
Ruggs was the focal point for the annual Ruggs-Hardman Christmas Bird County started in 1967 by local high school students. The count mirrored the National Audubon Society's Christmas Bird Count. Reports from the 1978 count indicated that at least 3,300 bird species were counted within a 17-mile radius from Ruggs.

=== Agriculture ===
The grain elevator (pictured) at Ruggs has its origins in 1930. That year the Morrow County Grain Growers (MCGG) was formed to more effectively handle the selling of locally grown wheat. MCGG went into the wheat storage business in 1932 and built several local grain elevators in Ruggs and nearby Ione, McNab, Heppner, Paterson, Lexington, and North Lexington.
