= Silent Witness (1943 film) =

American crime film by Jean Yarbrough

- Theatrical release poster
- Directed by: Jean Yarbrough
- Screenplay by: Martin Mooney
- Produced by: Max King
- Starring: Frank Albertson; Maris Wrixon; Bradley Page; Evelyn Brent; Milburn Stone; John Sheehan
- Cinematography: Mack Stengler
- Edited by: Carl Pierson
- Music by: Edward J. Kay
- Production company: Monogram Pictures
- Distributed by: Monogram Pictures
- Release date: January 15, 1943
- Running time: 62 minutes
- Country: United States
- Language: English

Silent Witness is a 1943 American crime film directed by Jean Yarbrough and written by Martin Mooney. The film stars Frank Albertson, Maris Wrixon, Bradley Page, Evelyn Brent, Milburn Stone and John Sheehan. The film was released on January 15, 1943, by Monogram Pictures.

== Cast ==
- Frank Albertson as Bruce Strong
- Maris Wrixon as Betty Higgins
- Bradley Page as Robert Holden
- Evelyn Brent as Mrs. Roos / Anna Barnes
- Milburn Stone as Joe Manson
- John Sheehan as Dan Callahan
- Lucien Littlefield as Hank Eastman
- James Eagles as Jockey Carlos
- Patsy Nash as Elsie Jergens
- Anthony Warde as Lou Manson
- Paul Bryar as Blackie
- Jack Mulhall as Jed Kelly
- Kenneth Harlan as Tommy Jackson
- Harry Harvey Sr. as Monk
- Charles Jordan as Mr. Jergens
- Robert 'Buzz' Henry as Johnny Jergens
- Virginia Carroll as Mrs. Marjorie Miller
- Sam McDaniel as Deacon
- Olaf Hytten as Sidney
- Margaret Armstrong as Mrs. Higgins
- Herbert Rawlinson as Benjamin Yeager
- Caroline Burke as Nurse
- Henry Hall as Judge
- John Ince as The Mayor
- Joseph Eggenton as Si Ames
- Ace the Wonder Dog as Major
