= Caroline Burke =

American producer and journalist (1913–1964)

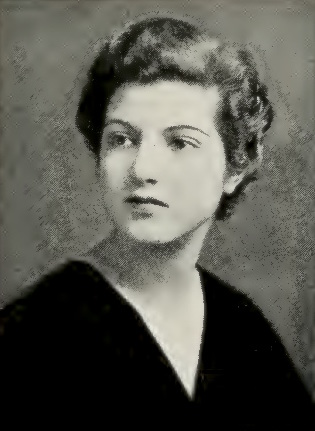
- Burke in her 1933 college yearbook photo
- Born: Caroline Flora Berg; July 7, 1913; Portland, Oregon, U.S.
- Died: December 5, 1964 (aged 51); New York City, U.S.
- Resting place: Beth Israel Cemetery Portland, Oregon, U.S.
- Other name: Caroline Swann
- Education: Bryn Mawr College (AB)
- Occupations: Actress, theater and television producer, art collector
- Years active: 1942–1964
- Spouses: Cyrus Max Adler (m. 1945): Erwin Swann (unknown; her death 1964)

Caroline Flora Burke (née Berg; July 7, 1913 – December 5, 1964) was an American actress, theater producer, television producer, writer, and art collector. She appeared in several films in the early 1940s before becoming a theater producer in New York City, notably producing several stage productions of Harold Pinter plays and Broadway productions. She also worked as a producer for NBC in the 1950s, and at the time was the company's only female producer.

The daughter of a prominent Portland, Oregon businessman, Burke studied art history at Bryn Mawr College before embarking on a short-lived career as an actress. Her first role was a starring part in The Mysterious Rider (1942), which she followed with three minor film appearances before retiring from film acting. In the 1950s, she transitioned into executive and production work for NBC, as well as theatre producing for various Broadway and Off-Broadway productions. In addition to her career in entertainment, Burke also taught television production at Columbia University, and was the founder of the art history department at Reed College. She died of undisclosed causes in 1964 while in the midst of producing a second Harold Pinter stage production, which opened the week following her death.

Burke and her husband, business executive Erwin Swann, owned a significant art collection of modernist paintings and sculpture—including works by Pablo Picasso, Paul Gauguin, and Auguste Rodin—which has shown at several national art museums. Additionally, the couple's collection of cartoon and caricature artwork is owned by the U.S. Library of Congress.

== Early life ==
Burke was born Caroline Flora Berg on July 7, 1913, in Portland, Oregon to a Jewish family. Her mother was Saidee (née Rosenberg), and her father, Charles F. Berg, was a prominent Portland news radio executive and President of the Pacific Coast Advertising Men's Association. Her father, a native of San Francisco, also founded the Charles F. Berg Company, a local Portland women's clothing chain, and co-produced "The Hoot Owls," a pioneering radio sketch show for KGW. The Charles F. Berg Building, an Art Deco building in downtown Portland that served as one of the Berg storefronts, is named for her father, who died there of a heart attack in 1932. She had one elder brother, Forrest Talbott Berg, from her father's previous marriage.

Burke graduated from the Catlin Hillside School (now Catlin Gabel School), after which she attended Bryn Mawr College in Bryn Mawr, Pennsylvania, where she earned a Bachelor of Arts degree in art history in 1933.

== Career ==
In 1941 and 1942, Burke appeared on Broadway in productions of Brooklyn, U.S.A. and Gilbert Miller's Heart of a City, respectively. In the spring of 1942, she relocated to Los Angeles to pursue a career in film. It was noted in a July 1, 1942 article in the Detroit Free Press:

Some weeks ago, a petite New York miss named Caroline Burke came to Hollywood. Object: Screen career. Experience: Two bits in Broadway shows and some radio appearances. Hollywood producers were not sufficiently interested to give her interviews. Agents were too unimpressed to represent her... Instead of encouraging her, [agents] stressed the difficulties of crashing studio gates. But pint-size Miss Burke is a person of determination. "Others have done it," said she, "and so can I."

Burke appeared in a total of four films, with her first and only leading role as Martha Kincaid in The Mysterious Rider (1942) opposite Buster Crabbe. While appearing in films in Hollywood, she simultaneously worked as an advertising and radio editor in California. From 1946 to 1956 she was one of the first women producers in television, producing, writing and directing network series for the National Broadcasting Company (NBC), including the award-winning telecast of Pirandello's Six Characters in Search of an Author. In the 1950s, she served on NBC's radio show, Monitor, and interviewed various public figures, including actor Marlon Brando.

She spent her later life living and working in New York City, where she was a theatrical producer, co-producing Broadway stagings of Paddy Chayefsky's The Tenth Man, and Brendan Behan's The Hostage. In 1962, she produced the first stage productions of Harold Pinter's The Dumb Waiter and The Collection at the Cherry Lane Theatre. In her later life, she was also a contributing editor for Diplomat magazine, and taught television production at Columbia University. At the time of her death in 1964, she was in the midst of producing an Off-Broadway production of Pinter's first play, The Room.

== Art collection ==
In addition to her career in entertainment, Burke was an avid art collector, and founded the art history department at Reed College in her hometown of Portland, Oregon. She and her husband's art collection included works by Pablo Picasso, Paul Gauguin, Paul Klee, Joan Miró, Édouard Vuillard, Georges Rouault; and sculpture by Auguste Rodin, Edgar Degas, Georges Braque, and William Zorach. The collection was displayed at Huntington Hartford's Gallery of Modern Art in New York and at the Portland Art Museum in 1964.

The Caroline and Erwin Swann Collection of Caricature and Cartoon is owned by the Library of Congress, and contains 2,085 drawings, prints, and paintings related to the art of caricature, cartoon, and illustration.

== Personal life ==
On August 7, 1945, Burke married camera manufacturing magnate Cyrus Max Adler at the Portland home of her brother, Forrest, in a private Jewish ceremony.

Burke later married advertising executive Erwin D. Swann, who worked for the Foote, Cone & Belding Ad Agency; the couple resided in Manhattan at 24 West 55th Street.

== Death ==
Burke died of undisclosed causes at Memorial Hospital in Manhattan on December 5, 1964. She was survived by her husband, as well as her mother, Saidee Berg, and her brother, Forrest Berg.

== Filmography ==
Year	Title	Role	Notes	Ref.
1942	The Mysterious Rider	Martha Kincaid	Only starring role	
1943	Silent Witness	Nurse		
1943	Spy Train	Minor role		
1945	Rhapsody in Blue	Party Guest		

== Stage credits ==
=== Production ===
Year	Title	Role	Notes	Ref.
1959–1961	The Hostage	Producer	Broadway	
1960–1961	The Tenth Man	Associate producer	Broadway	
1962	The Collection	Producer	Off-Broadway	
1962–1964	The Dumb Waiter	Producer	Off-Broadway	
1964	A Slight Ache	Producer	Off-Broadway	
1964	The Room	Producer	Off-Broadway	

=== As performer ===
Year	Title	Role	Notes	Ref.
1941–1942	Brooklyn, U.S.A.		Broadway	
1942	Heart of a City	Patsy	Broadway	
