= Henry Heppner =

Jewish-American businessman

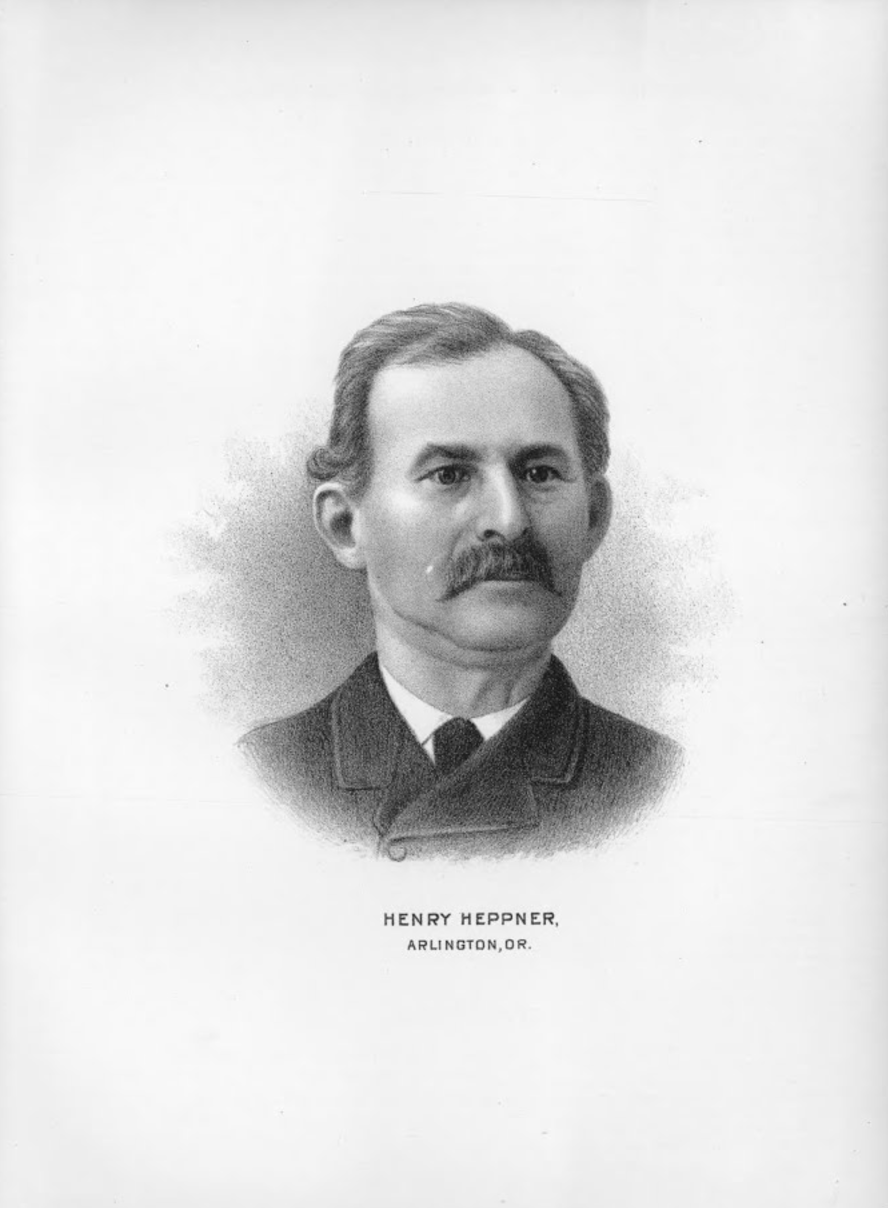
- Henry Heppner from "History of the Pacific Northwest: Oregon and Washington." Published in 1889.
- Born: c. 1831; Żerków, Prussia
- Died: February 16, 1905; Heppner, Oregon, U.S.
- Burial place: Beth Israel Cemetery

Henry Heppner (c. 1831 – February 16, 1905) was a prominent Jewish-American civil leader and entrepreneur in eastern Oregon. Heppner, Oregon, was named in his honor.

== Early life ==
Heppner was born near Zerkow, Prussia, in present-day Żerków, Poland. Sources differ on his precise birth year with at least three dates given—1825, 1831, and 1843. Heppner's headstone in the Beth Israel Cemetery in Portland, Oregon, lists his birth year as 1831. Conversely, the 1880 U.S. Census lists him as 38 at the time of the census, suggesting he was born c. 1842–43. Yet still, a final source states that Heppner himself didn't know his birth year.

Heppner emigrated with most of his family from Prussia to the United States c. 1849 most likely via Hamburg, Germany. Heppner's emigration dates from Prussia also differ; one source states he emigrated as early as 1849. Other sources suggest 1855 or 1858. At least two siblings—Kaskel Heppner and Fanny Blackman (née Heppner)—are recorded as having emigrated separately via Hamburg, Germany in June 1851 and May 1873, respectively.

== Adulthood ==
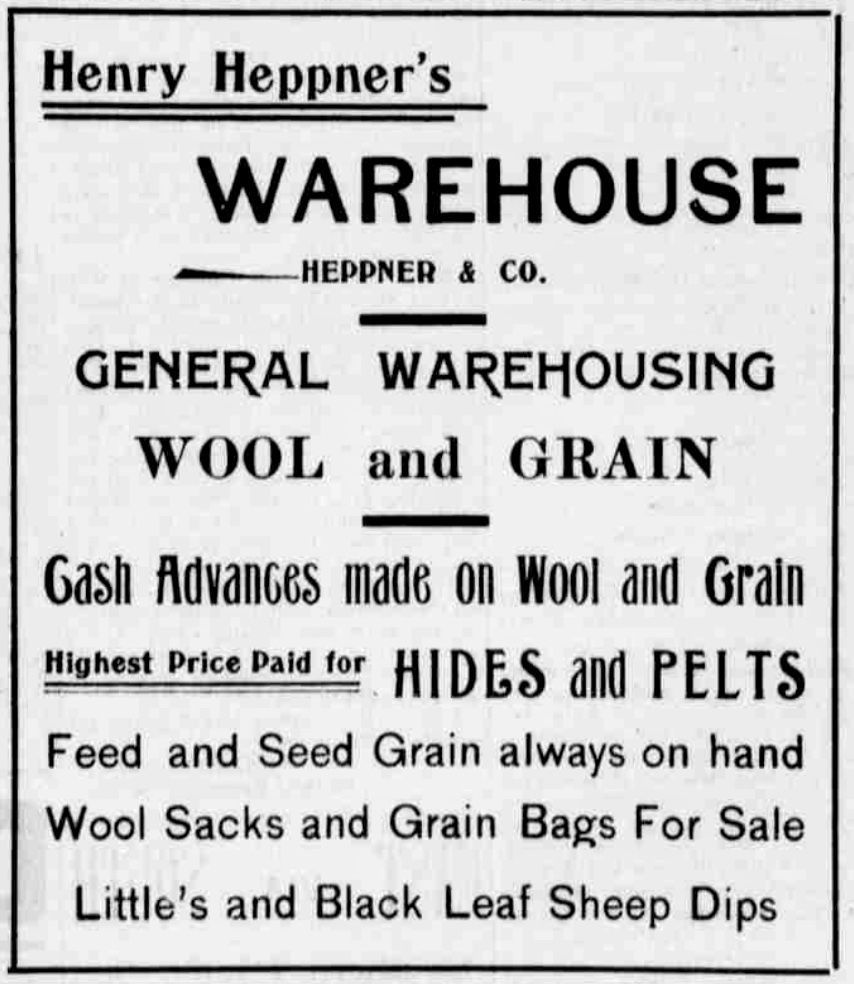
Ad for Henry Heppner's Warehouse in Heppner, Oregon in the Heppner gazette. (Heppner, Morrow County, Or.) 1892–1912, April 19, 1900, Image 3; Image provided by Morrow County Museum; Heppner, OR; University of Oregon Libraries.

Heppner and other family members first settled in New York and later in California. In California, Heppner clerked a store and eventually began his own mercantile business. Heppner eventually relocated from California to Oregon where he spent time in Corvallis and The Dalles. The 1860 U.S. Census listed his occupation as a pack train operator in Wasco County. Circa 1862, Heppner joined hundreds seeking profits from recent gold discoveries in eastern Oregon and western Idaho. Heppner found opportunity and success in freighting supplies to the mining districts for over ten years.

Heppner settled in eastern Oregon where he was involved in early merchant work in parts of the present-day towns of Arlington, Heppner, La Grande, and Umatilla. Heppner found success in a variety of business ventures in eastern Oregon. One of his most prominent was establishing a store with Colonel Jackson Lee Morrow in 1873 in Stansbury Flats, a small settlement in north-central Oregon. The settlement would later rename itself Heppner in Heppner's honor despite his objections.

Heppner and his brother-in-law, Henry Blackman, were successful business partners in several early enterprises in and around Heppner. Among their pursuits were building and managing a warehouse and a general trading store. These businesses were so successful in the early 1880s that they reportedly influenced the Oregon Railroad and Navigation Company to bring rail transportation to Heppner as early as December 7, 1889.

== Final years ==
Heppner would go on to support several efforts to build the nascent town named after him. He co-founded the Heppner Gazette newspaper with Henry Blackman and contributed relief and recovery funds to the town following the Flood of 1903. He was a member of Heppner Masonic Order and at one point affectionately called "Uncle Henry" in local press. He and his nephew, Phill Cohn, provided substantial contributions to the construction of the first Catholic church in Heppner. Heppner did not wed or have children. He was characterized as "an unpretentious man, [who] dressed simply, and lived simply." Additional sources described him as "a little eccentric, [but also] a big-hearted man." In a 1971 history of the County of Morrow, Heppner was described as a "5' 6", 150-pound bundle of mental energy, always planning the next move. More than anyone else, he shaped the destin[y] of Heppner."

Heppner died on February 16, 1905 in Heppner following at least two years of complications from several illnesses. Sources again conflict on the date, though one newspaper assures readers that Heppner passed on the same day that the County of Morrow was founded. A few days after his death, a Portland-based newspaper stated that with Heppner's passing "goes...a prominent landmark in the history of Heppner and Morrow County. In times of need he has helped many." Heppner's last will and testament divided the profits from his estate among his surviving siblings and relatives, including Dora, Elias, Elizabeth, Fanny, Flora, Kaskel, and Jenny. He was buried in the Beth Israel Cemetery in Portland, Oregon. The value of Heppner's estate in 1905 was valued at $150,000, roughly equivalent to $3.5 million in 2017.

In a 1916 edition of the Heppner Gazette-Times, the newspaper re-published an article from May 7, 1891, in which the paper states that "Heppner Ought To Have More Heppners," a nod to Heppner's business savvy and investment in the burgeoning town.

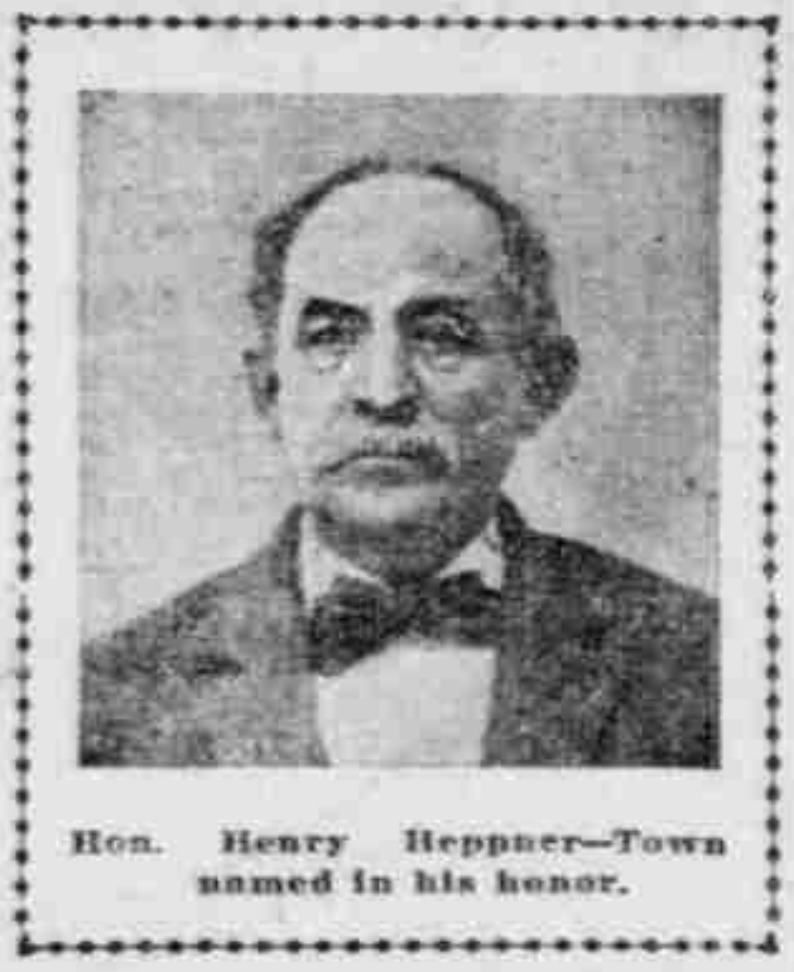
Photograph of Henry Heppner as published on June 16, 1903, in the Morning Oregonian newspaper. The caption states, "Honorable Henry Heppner - town named in his honor."
