= Heppner Library-Museum =

Coordinates: 45.3567°N 119.5530°W

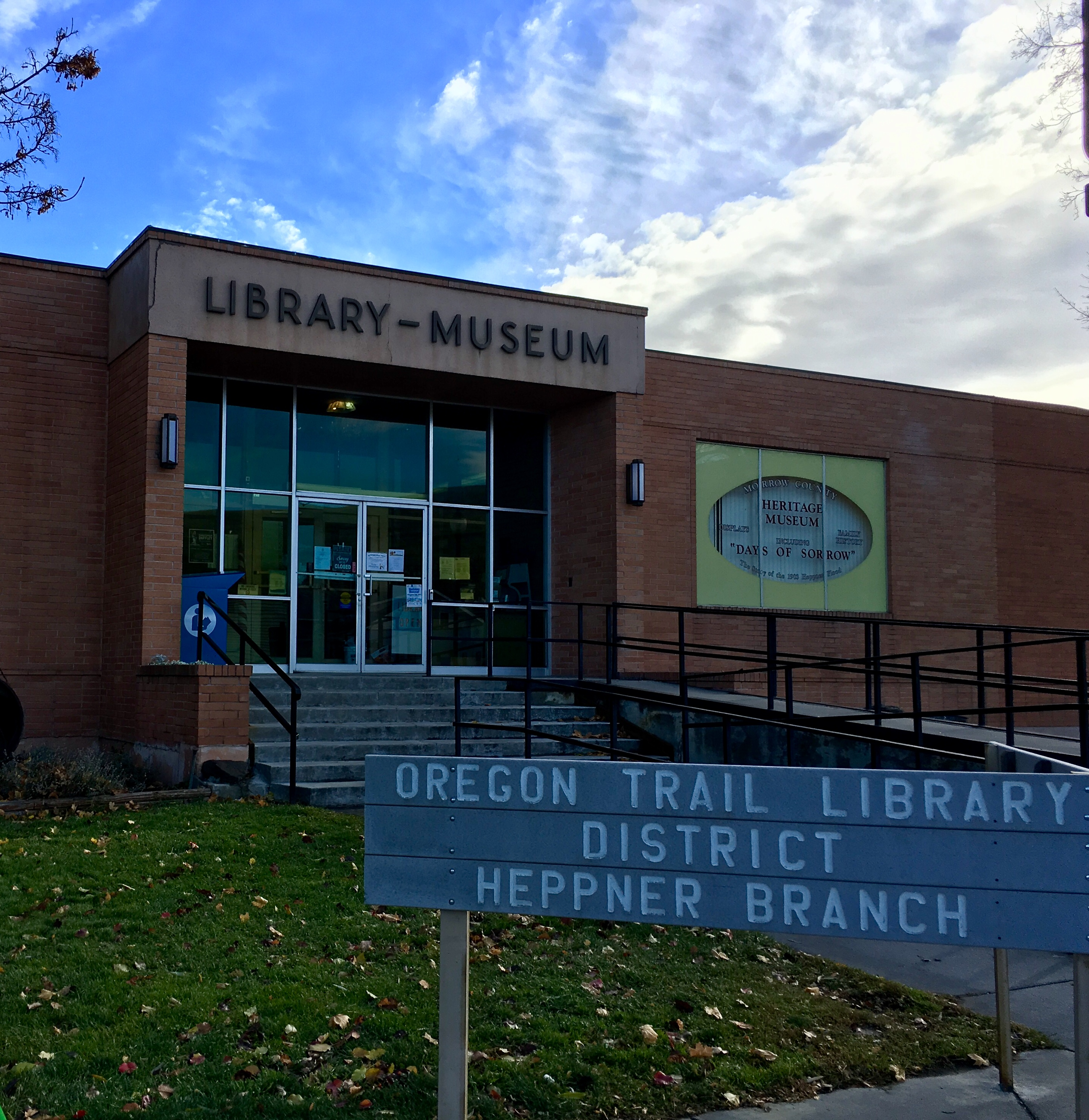
- Exterior of the Heppner Branch of the Oregon Trail Library District
- Location: Heppner, Morrow County, Oregon, United States of America
- Type: Public
- Scope: Eastern Oregon, Rural Oregon
- Established: 1893
- Branch of: Oregon Trail Library District

Access and use
- Population served: 12,000

Other information
- Website: Official site

The Heppner Library-Museum is a joint public library and county museum located in Heppner, Oregon. The library is a branch of the Oregon Trail Library District and part of Oregon's Sage Library System. In 1958, Mrs. Amanda Duvall gifted the library to Heppner as a memorial to her husband and daughter. The City of Heppner donated the land upon which Duvall’s gift was constructed. The work was completed by the McCormack Construction Company of Pendleton and the Case Furniture Company of Heppner. The Heppner Library-Museum was dedicated in 1960 and remains an active and important anchor in the community.

== History ==
=== Library ===
==== Early history ====
The Heppner Library has its origins as early as 1893 when two Heppner citizens campaigned to create the burgeoning town’s first library. H. E. Riner and O. K. Fitzsimmons reportedly canvassed the town for books and even persuaded the State Library of Oregon in Salem to donate at least a thousand books. Riner and Fitzsimmons also donated $500 each to aide in the library's startup. This first library was located in a small, nondescript wooden building on the main street.

Over the course of the next two decades the first library moved in and out of different buildings in Heppner. The library, for example, relocated into an old Baptist Church located at the present-day intersection of Gale and Baltimore streets. It was also relocated to Gale and West Willow streets where an Assembly of God Church one stood.

The first library met its demise in 1918 following a four-block fire. Newspaper reports at the time in the Heppner Herald characterized the fire as the "most destructive in the history of Heppner" and entailed a loss between $25,000 and $30,000. The fire reportedly began at the rear of the opera house building at Gale and West Willow streets. Community members spent the next few years reorganizing and reestablishing the library on Main Street. It occupied a small space in the town’s millinery shop. The library was restocked with at least three hundred books donated by the State Library of Oregon and gifts from local citizens.

In 1925, the library was again destroyed after fire erupted in a neighboring butcher's shop and newspaper reports indicate it was at least five more years before the town had a functioning library. The library was again reorganized around 1930 and temporarily located in the upper level of the Odd Fellows Building. Eventually, the library moved into a refurbished garage at the corners of Gale and West Willow streets bought by the City of Heppner in 1932. Over the next three decades, the library was managed by a number of librarians and citizens.

In the late 1940s, City of Heppner included $300 for the library in its budget for the first time. Up until this time, the library had chiefly been held together by volunteers and donations. One such act of citizen volunteerism recorded occurred in the late 1940s when a stove and chimney fire blackened the entire library. Board members and their families washed over every part of the room, the shelves and every book to clean the damage. In the 1950s, the librarian and the women who worked with here were paid 25 cents per hour from the $600 budget the city had allocated for the library. One librarian, Ruby Becket, served between 1954–56 and earned $40 per month.

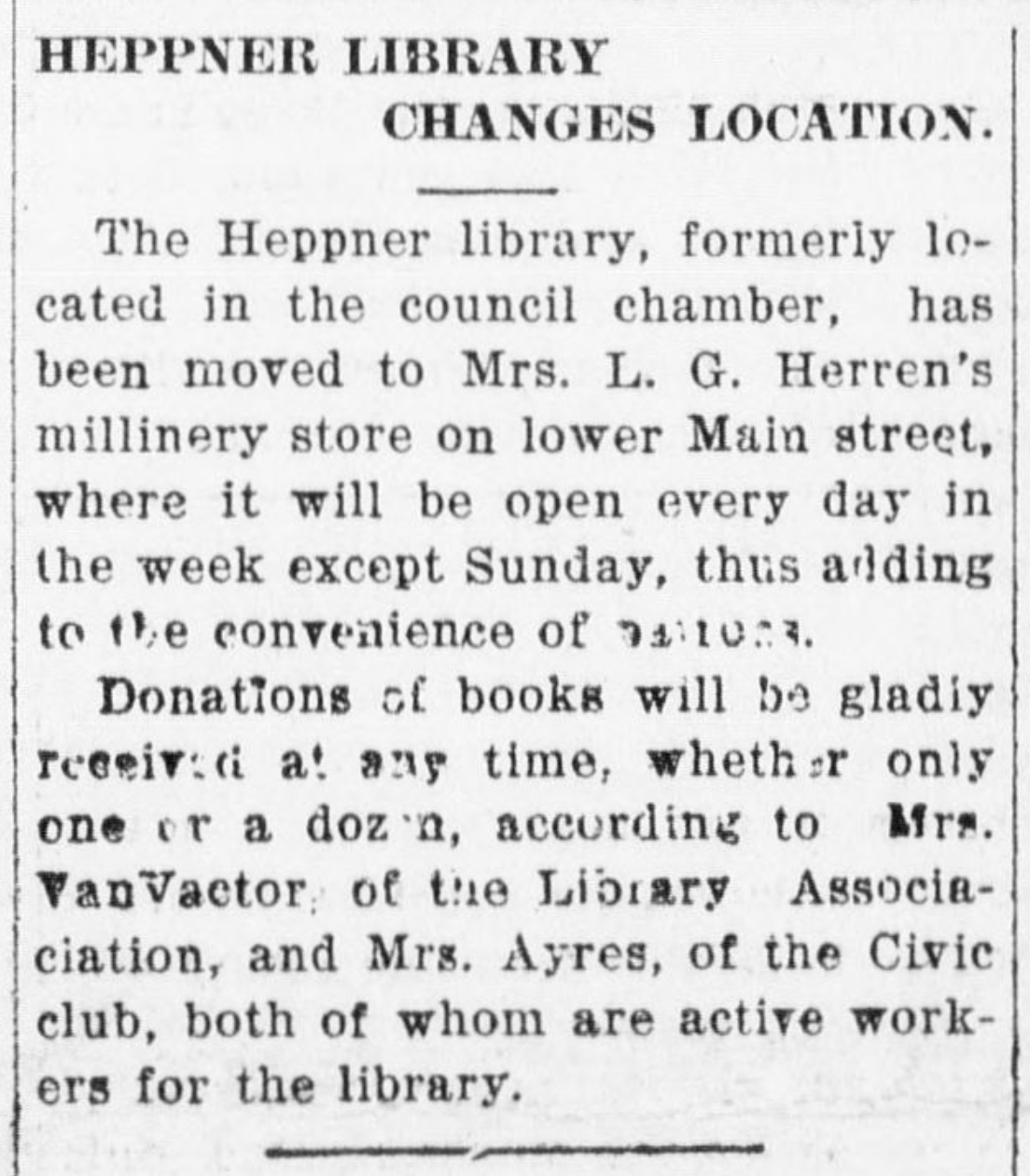
Newspaper article detailing the library's move to the millinery shop. Image provided by University of Oregon Libraries and the Morrow County Museum; Heppner, OR.

==== Modern history ====
In the late 1950s, Mrs. Amanda Duvall approached the City of Heppner with a gift to build a new joint library-museum building as a memorial to her husband, Harry Duvall, and her daughter, Erma Duvall Wickersham. Mrs. Duvall was inspired during the planning of Oregon's centennial celebration. The City of Heppner formed a seven-member commission in 1958 to accept Duvall's gift and begin plans for the then-new library. The library-museum building was originally planned to be located on the corner of May and Court streets but the land was too small. The City of Heppner then offered to donate sufficient land in its city park for the building. The library-museum building was designed by W. H. Gilmore, a Portland-based architect. The design called for a 64’ x 72’ concrete block building with a brick veneer finish. Bids for construction were solicited in July 1959 at an expected cost of approximately $65,000.

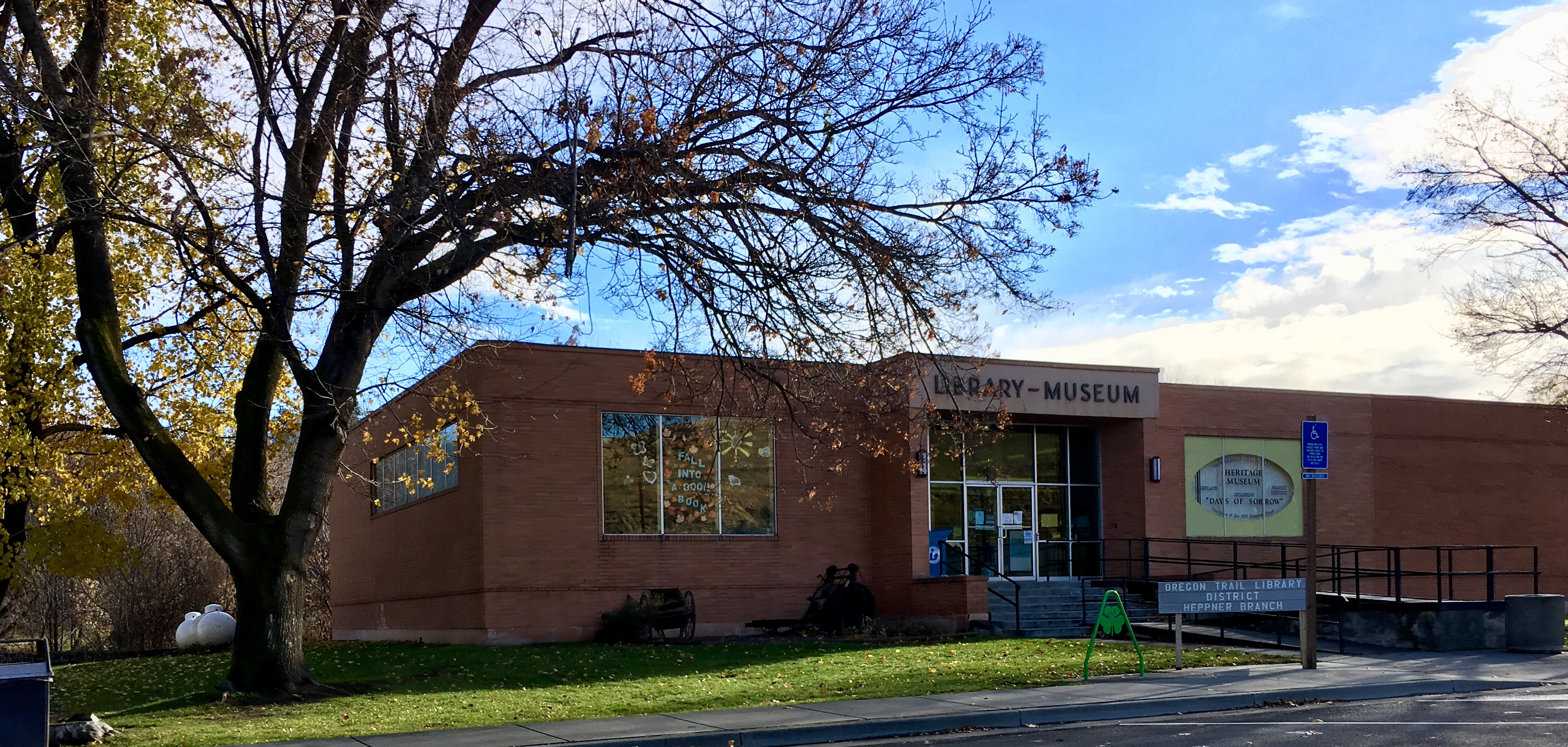
Heppner Library-Museum (November 2017).

In August 1959, the McCormack Construction Company of Pendleton was awarded the construction contract with a bid of $58,651. Case Furniture Company of Heppner was awarded a second contract for heating and ventilating on a bid of $6,176. The building had a final cost of approximately $70,000. The Heppner Library-Museum was dedicated in 1960 and remains an active and important anchor in the community.

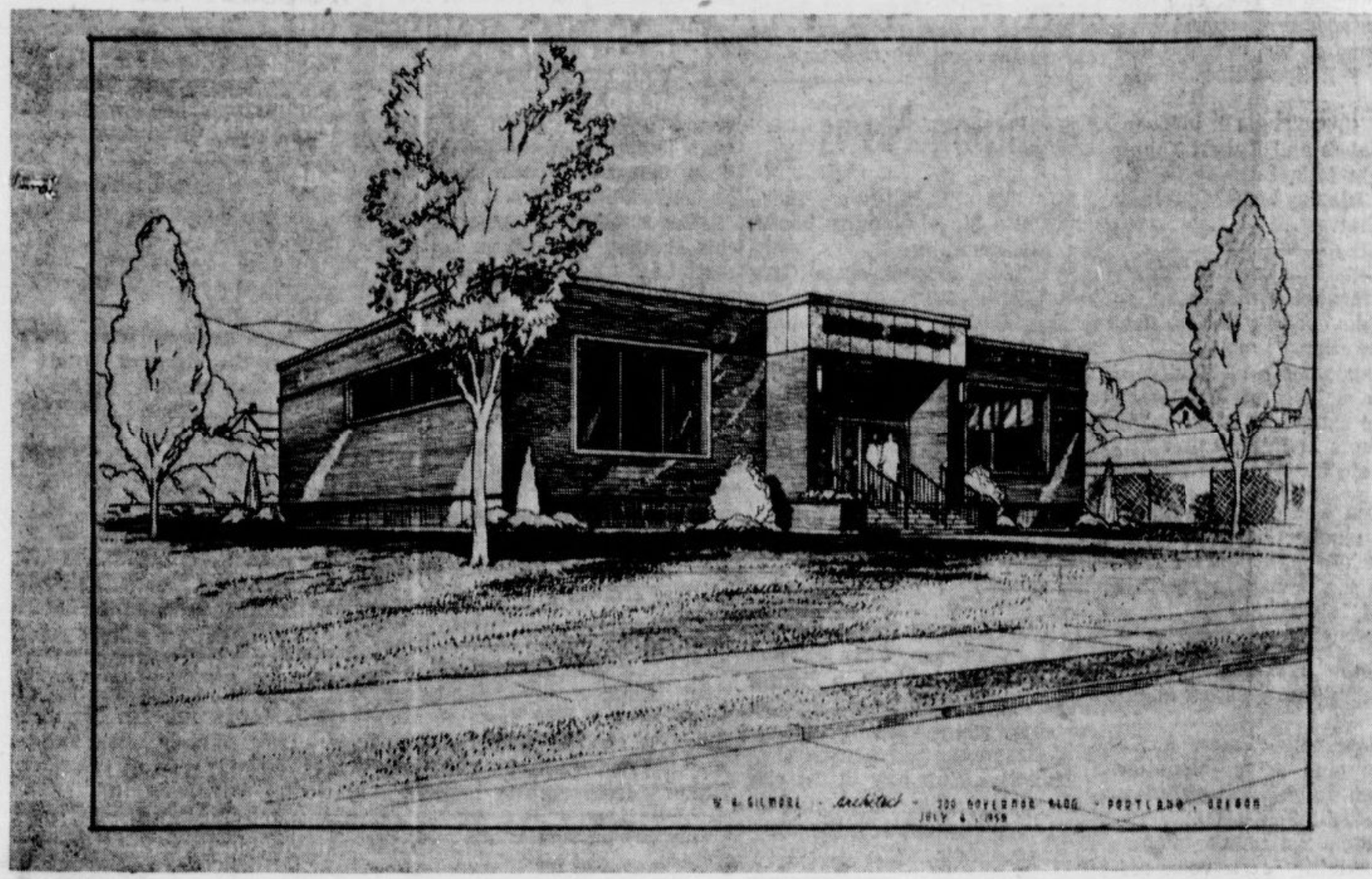
Heppner Library-Museum architectural rendering. Image provided by University of Oregon Libraries and the Morrow County Museum; Heppner, OR.

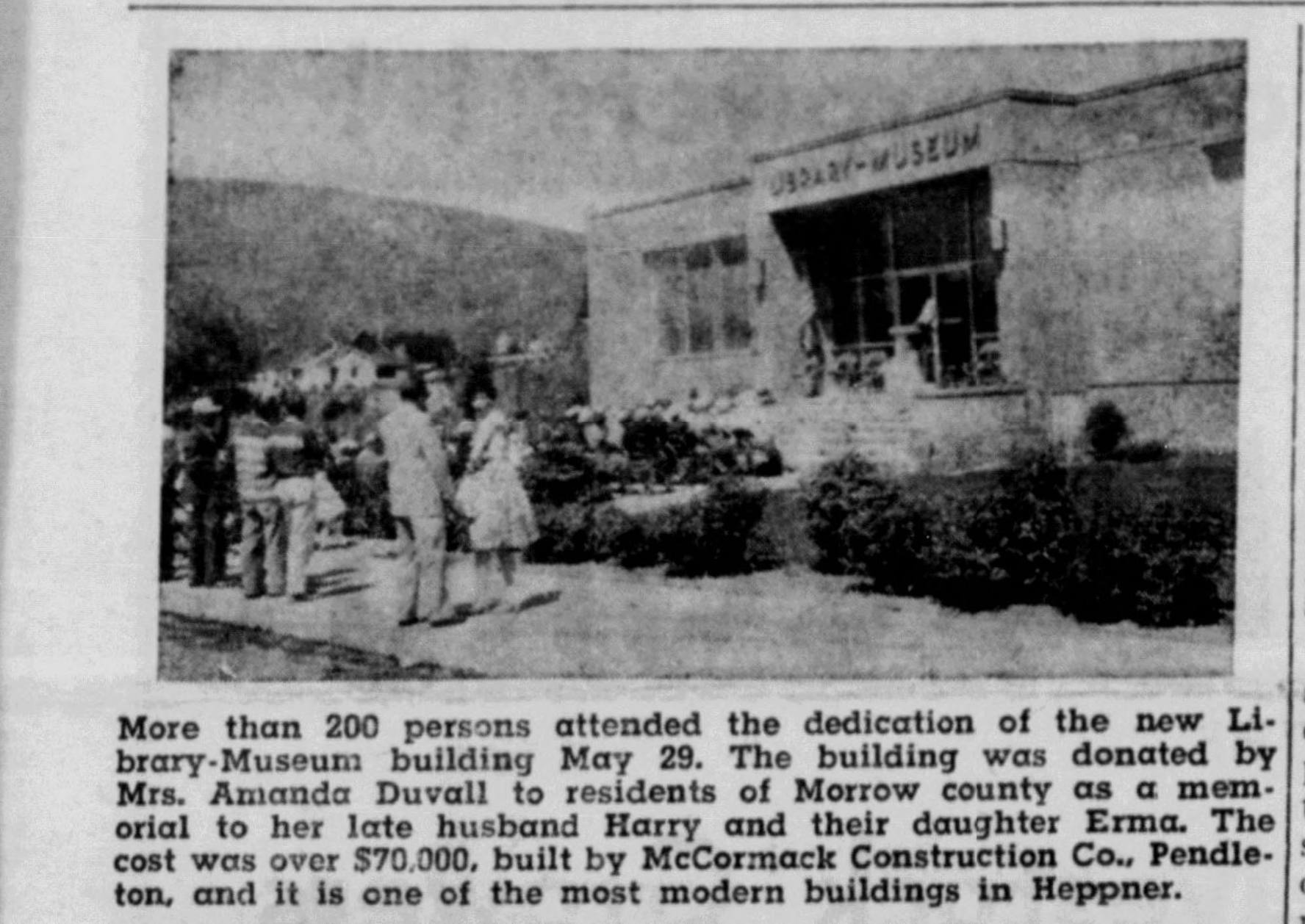
Heppner Library-Museum dedication ceremony. Image provided by University of Oregon Libraries and the Morrow County Museum; Heppner, OR.

=== Museum ===
The Morrow County Museum is colocated with the Heppner Library in the Heppner Library-Museum building. The museum’s collections include artifacts related to the region’s pioneer, homesteading, agricultural and rural histories. The museum possesses hundreds of photographs in the collection which document the social, economic and technological development of Morrow County. Exhibits range from agricultural history, the Native American presence in the county, the history of rural medical care, and the story of the Heppner Flood. The museum's founding is also credited to Mrs. Amanda Duvall.

== Notable people ==
- Mrs. O. K. Fitzsimmons, librarian
- Josephine Mahoney Baker, librarian
- Frances Case, librarian
- Madge Thomson, librarian
- Louise Becket, librarian
- Hannah Jones, librarian
- Martha Dick, librarian
- Evelyn Isom, librarian
- Ruby Becket, librarian
- Ella Smith, librarian
- Blanche Frye Brown, librarian
- Justine Weatherford, librarian
- Amanda Duvall, philanthropist
