= Solomon Hirsch =

19th century American politician

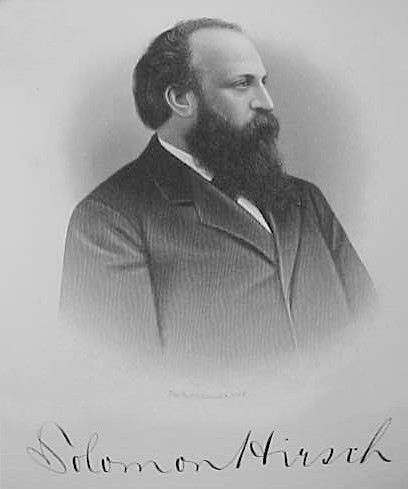
- Born: March 25, 1839
- Died: December 15, 1902 (aged 63)
- Occupations: Businessman; politician; ambassador
- Known for: Co-founder of Fleischner, Mayer and Co.; President of the Oregon State Senate
- Spouse: Josephine Mayer
- Children: 4

Solomon Hirsch (March 25, 1839 – December 15, 1902) was a businessman and United States politician from the state of Oregon. He was one of the leaders of Portland's early Jewish community.

== Early life and immigration ==
Solomon Hirsch was born on March 25, 1839, in Württemberg, Germany. Immigrating to New York in 1854 at the age of 15, Hirsch's journey to the United States began with forty-two days at sea. His early career saw him working as a clerk and salesman in various cities before he moved to the Pacific Coast, influenced by his brothers' success in Oregon.

== Business career ==
Settling in Portland in April 1858, Hirsch opened a retail store in Dallas, Oregon, and later engaged in business in Silverton. He later joined L. Fleischner & Company, eventually co-founding Fleischner, Mayer & Company in 1875 with Jacob Mayer and Louis Fleischner, the largest wholesale dry goods and men's furnishings enterprise in the region. Hirsch remained a pivotal figure in the firm until his death, contributing to its expansion across Oregon, Washington, Idaho, and Montana.

== Political and civic engagement ==
Hirsch's political career began with his election to the Oregon State Legislature in 1872, where he played a key role in electing United States Senator John H. Mitchell. Hirsch served in the Oregon State Senate from 1874 to 1885, including a term as Senate President in 1880, and was instrumental in enacting significant legislation, including an assignment law benefiting the poor to which he introduced an amendment giving it many features in common with the more recently adopted national bankruptcy law. He was a respected Mason, achieving recognition within the order alongside Cyrus A. Dolph in 1902. He also served as chairman of the Oregon Republican State Committee, having been elected to that position in 1882.

Hirsch served as Envoy Extraordinary and Minister Plenipotentiary to the Ottoman Empire from 1889 to 1892. His diplomatic service was highly regarded, earning commendations from both the U.S. Department of State and missionaries in the Ottoman Empire. Although offered further diplomatic roles, Hirsch declined to focus on his business and community commitments.

Hirsch was a life member of the Portland Library Association, president of the Beth Israel Congregation, and actively involved in the Chamber of Commerce.

== Death ==
Solomon Hirsch died on December 15, 1902. Eulogies at his memorial service, including those by Rabbi Stephen S. Wise and then-Mayor George H. Williams, highlighted his virtues, achievements, and the respect he commanded across all sectors of society.

Hirsch was buried at Beth Israel Cemetery in Portland, Oregon.

== Family and legacy ==
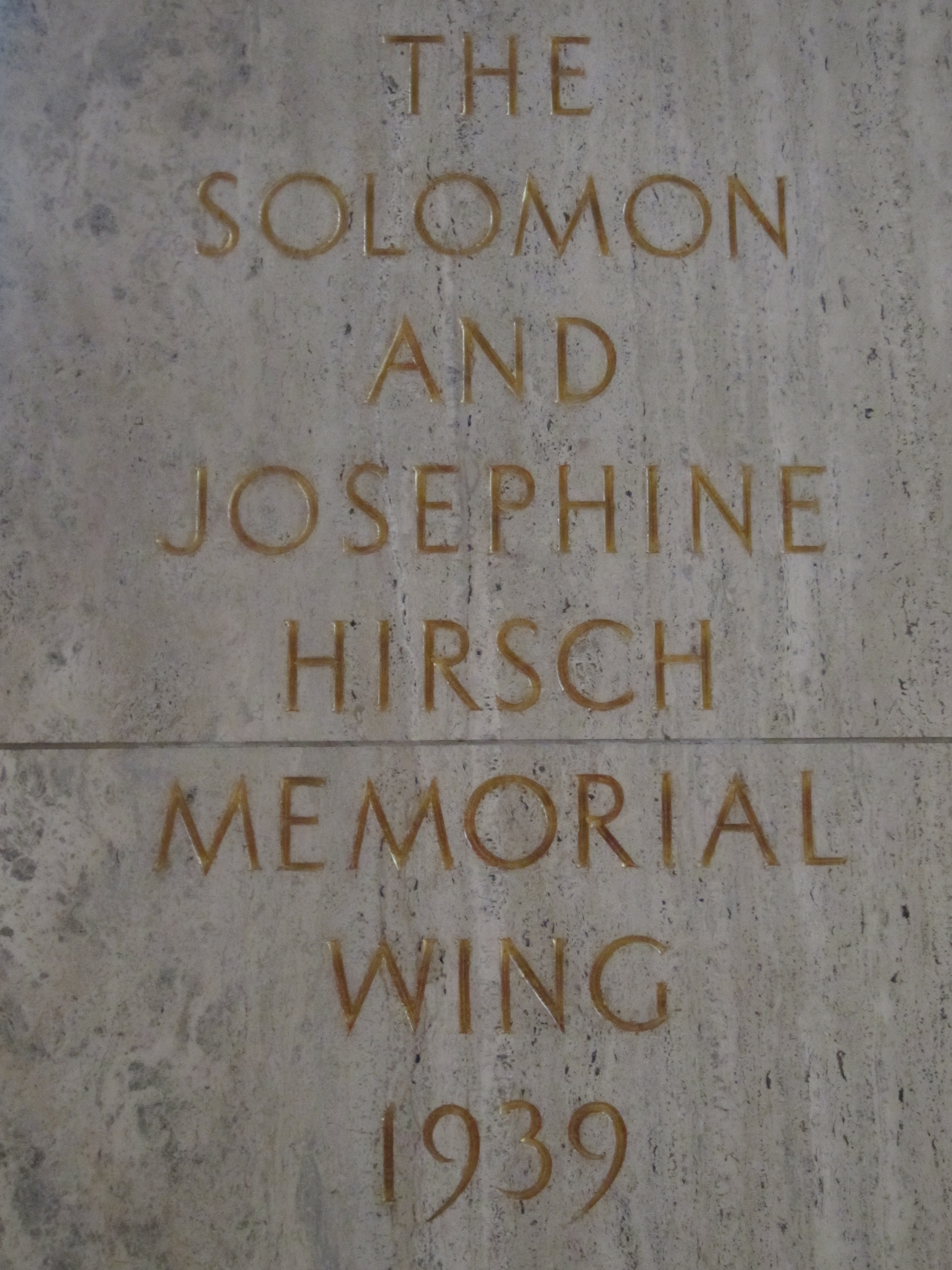
Hirsch memorial wing at the Portland Art Museum

Hirsch's wife Josephine was the leader of the Portland Equal Suffrage League. Josephine was the daughter of Solomon's business partner Jacob Mayer; they had 4 children: Ella Hirsch (born 1871); Sanford Hirsch (born 1873); May Hirsch (born 1875), and Clementine Hirsch (born 1880). Like his business partner Louis Fleischner, Hirsch's brother de:Edward Hirsch served as Oregon State Treasurer.

A wing at the Portland Art Museum was dedicated to Solomon and Josephine Hirsch in 1939 after their daughter Ella bequeathed $853,000 ($19.7 million in 2025 dollars) to the museum.
