= Palace Hotel (Heppner, Oregon) =

Coordinates: 45.3534°N 119.5536°W

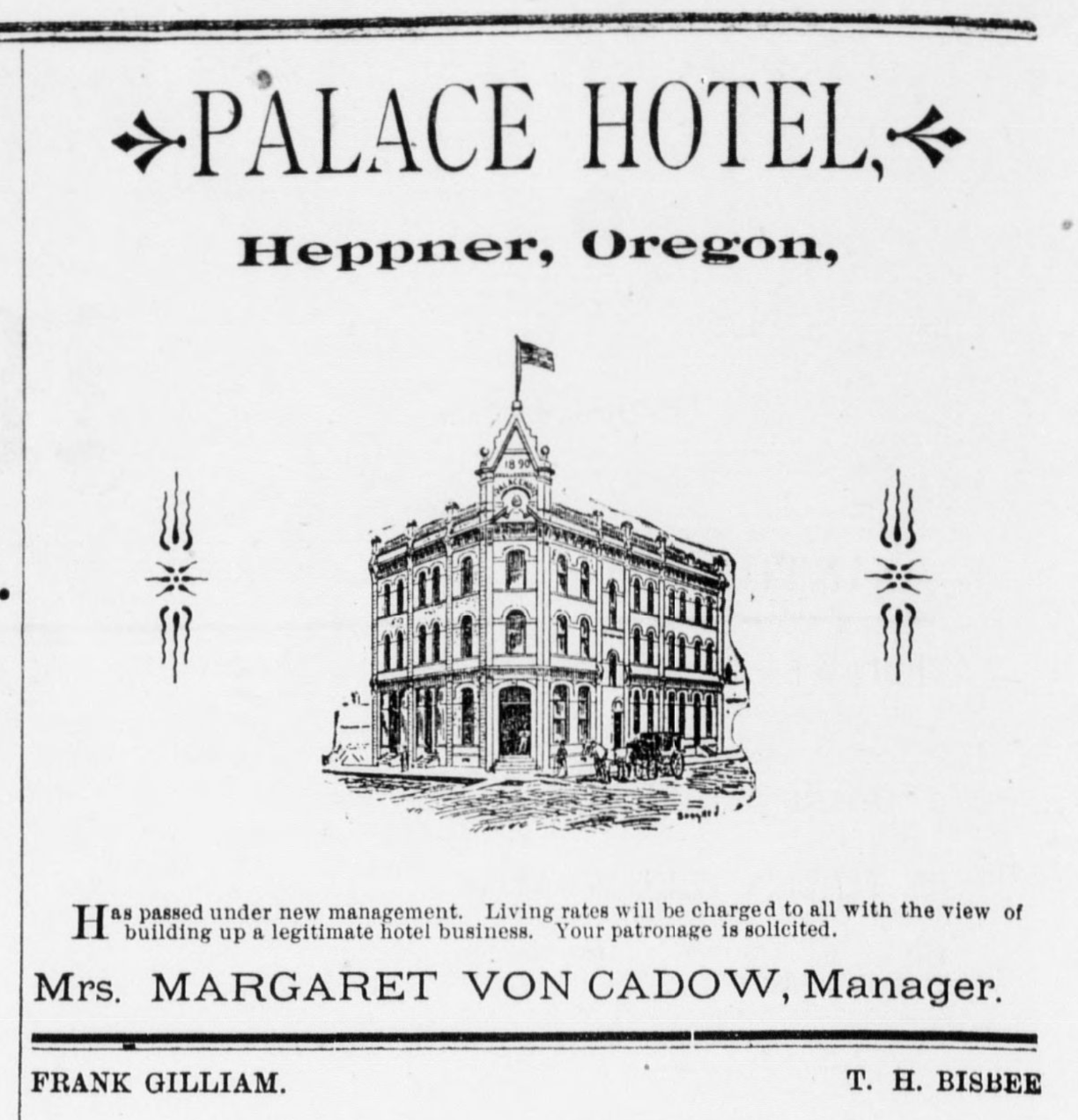
Palace Hotel, 1892.

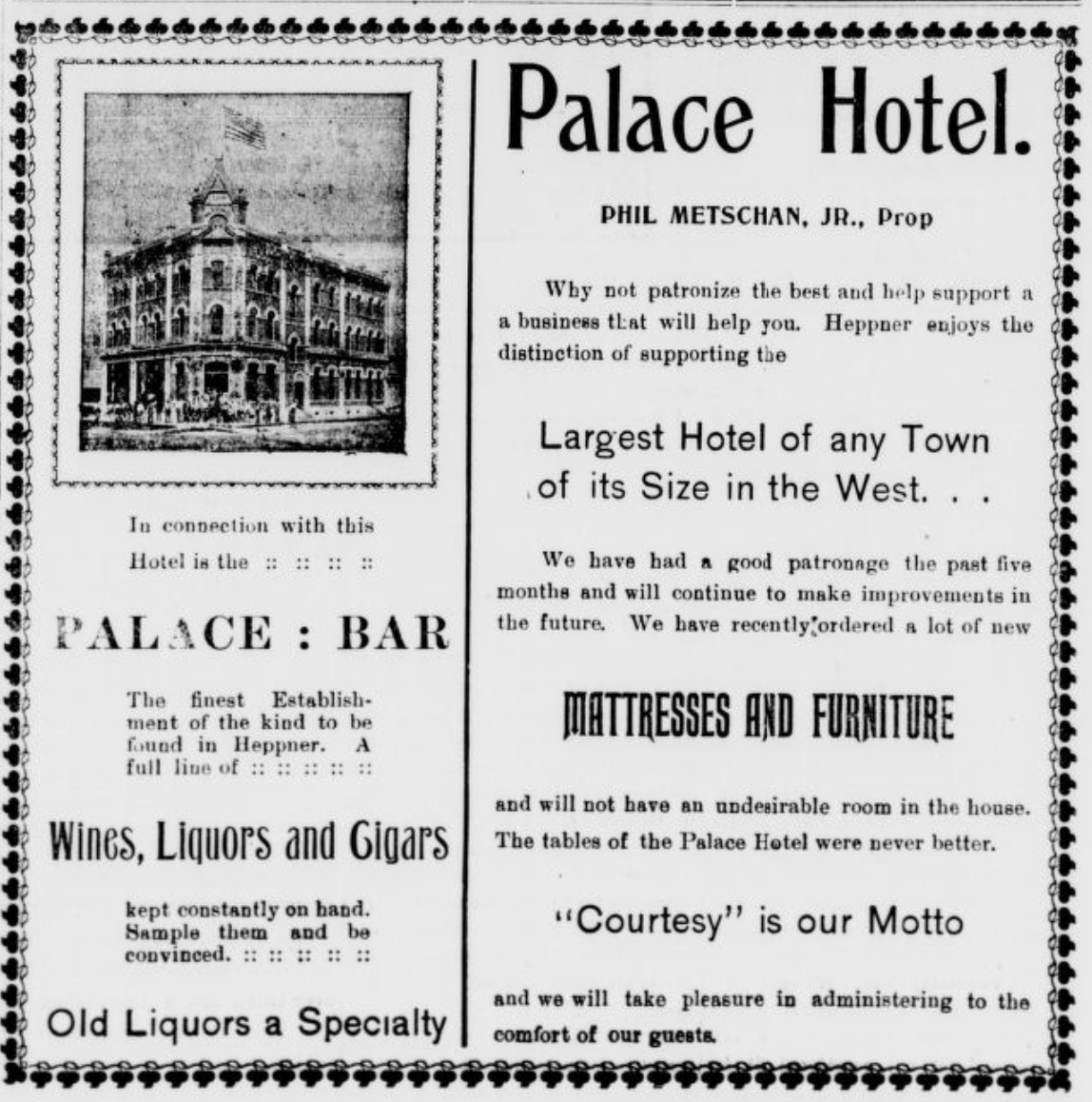
Palace Hotel, 1903.

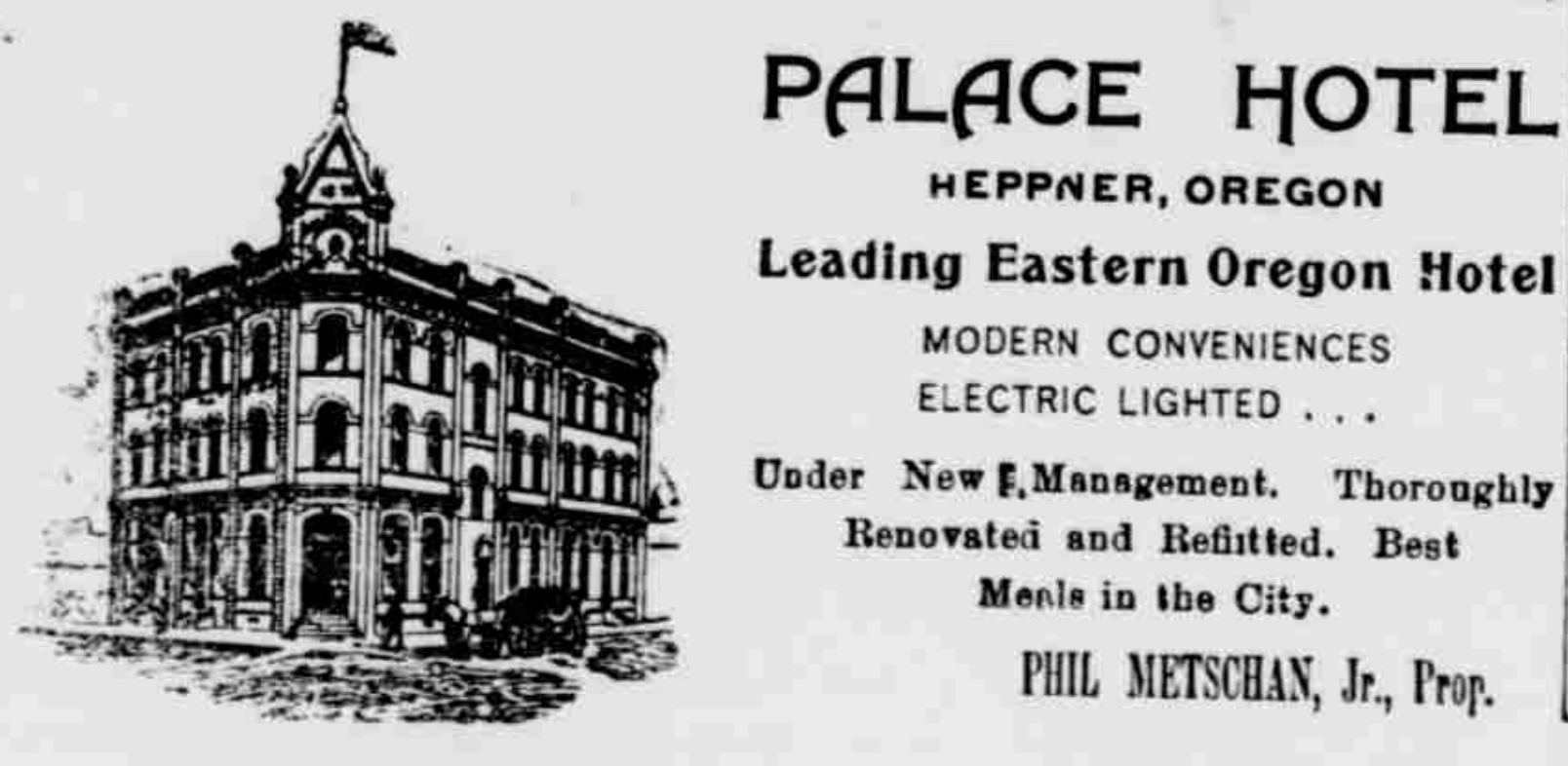
Palace Hotel, 1904.

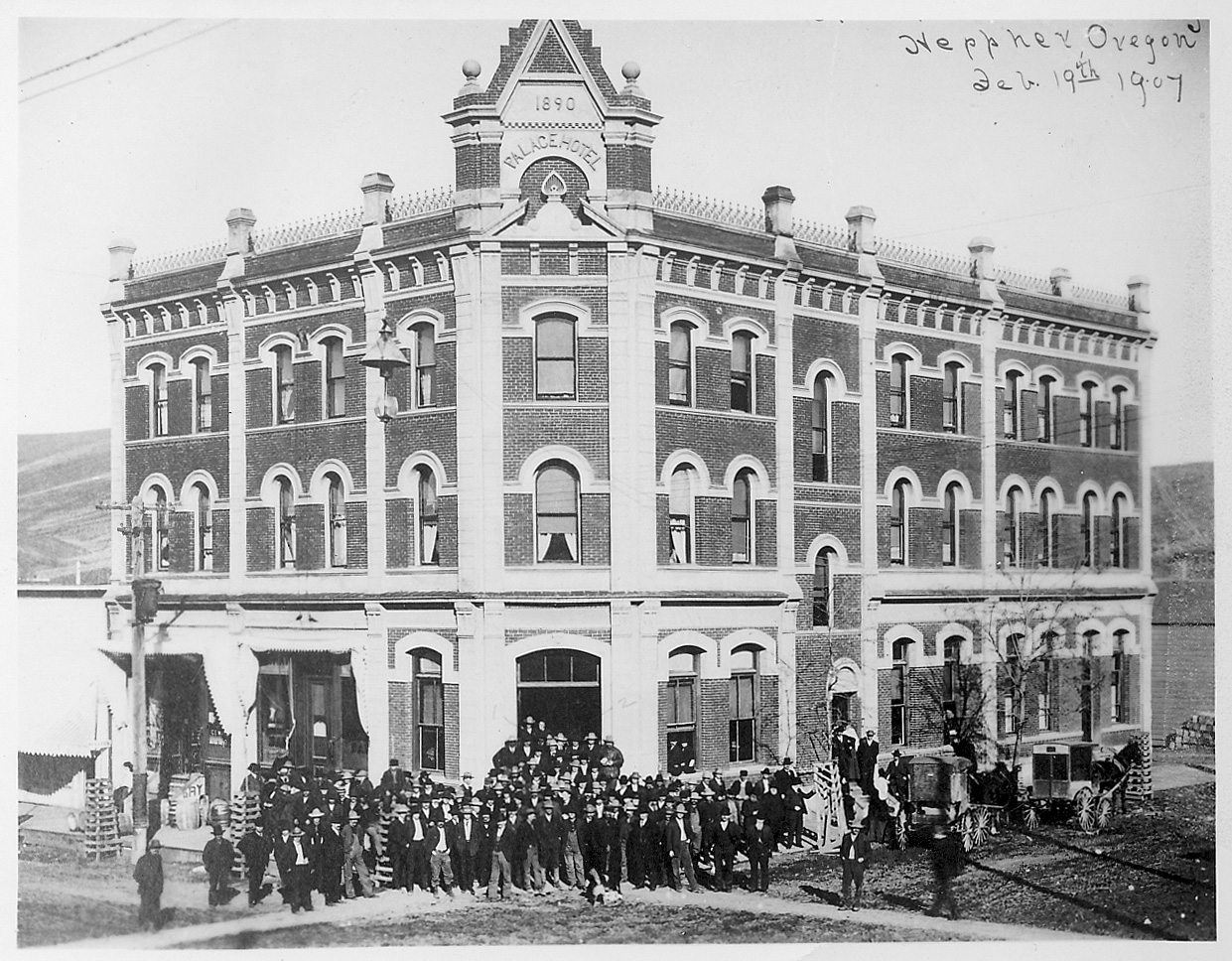
Palace Hotel, 1907.

The Palace Hotel was a three-story, brick hotel in Heppner, Oregon built in 1890. The hotel was lost to fire on 4 July 1918.

== Origins ==
"There remains no doubt of the success of the enterprise."

In 1889, Heppner was witnessing growth following the advent of railway into the town. As a result, demand for improved hotel accommodations grew, and between October and November 1889 community members incorporated the Palace Hotel Company with a capital stock of $40,000. The purpose of the Palace Hotel Company was to build "good accommodations" and "build a structure that will be an ornament to the city and supply much-needed entertainment for visitors" for the burgeoning town of Heppner.

Prominent community leaders who promoted the construction early on included Albert Wright, C. A. Rhea, Henry Blackman, J. B. Natter, J. W. Morrow, and Thomas Quaid. These men were characterized as "men possessed of the enterprise and capital necessary to carry any such undertaking to a successful issue."

In January 1890, a newspaper proclaimed that the venture was "a test of the town's vitality to thus provide for its growth and Heppner has exhibited a spirit of progress in advance of many other towns in the state."

"This hotel will be a credit to our town."

Palace Hotel Co. stock holders met in February 1890 and elected J. L. Morrow as president, Henry Blackman as vice president, and J. W. Morrow as secretary. Soon thereafter, ads appeared in local newspapers soliciting construction bids. Tyson & Boyd received the contract build the hotel's foundation and excavation began in early April 1890. Foundation work was completed in late May and brickwork began soon thereafter.

== Hotel ==
Construction finished in 1890 and in August 1891 the building was leased to Will Van Cadow and opened on 5 September 1891. Mr. Cadow's wife, Mrs. M. Von Cadow, took over as the proprietress by 1894 and helped earn the hotel "an enviable reputation as a first-class hostelry."

The Palace Hotel was located at the corners of May and Main streets in Heppner. It was classified as a "strictly modern house in all its appointments — practically fire-proof, provided with water, baths and electric lights." Its notoriety was widespread in the region with newspapers and publications hailing it "a fine hostelry as is to be found in any other town of twice the size in the Inland Empire."

== Fire ==
On 4 July 1918, a fire "fanned by a high wind" began near the Palace Hotel that "swept clean" four and a half blocks of Heppner. The fire reportedly began in the rear of the Patterson barber shop next to the Palace Hotel. Twenty-five families were left homeless though no casualties were recorded. At the time of the event, a local newspaper credited Mrs. Wilkins as the "heroine of the occasion." Mrs. Wilkins was managing the hotel in her husband's absence and reportedly alerted all guests of the fire. The damage was estimated at $200,000.

In the wake of the fire and a separate one week prior, the Heppner Herald printed a scathing editorial whereupon it opined that "most any intelligent person, accustomed to the habits and methods of thinking in vogue with among the people of other live western towns would have been positive that the experience of a few weeks ago was necessary to arouse Heppner to the need for immediate action in the way of getting some sort of fire protection."
