= Jackson L. Morrow =

American politician

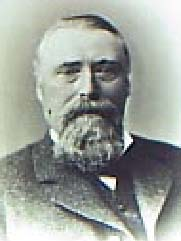

Member of the Oregon House of Representatives
- In office ? – January 10, 1887
- Constituency: Morrow and Umatilla counties

Personal details
- Born: October 18, 1827 Kentucky
- Died: September 22, 1899 (aged 71) Heppner, Oregon
- Party: Democratic
- Spouse: Nancy McEwan
- Children: 8

Jackson Lee Morrow (October 18, 1827 – September 22, 1899) was a Democratic member of the Oregon House of Representatives during the 1880s and the namesake of Morrow County.

== Biography ==
Morrow was born in Kentucky in 1827. He moved with his family to Illinois in 1837 and to Iowa in 1840. In 1853, Morrow moved to Mason County, Washington, where was elected county auditor and was involved in the relocation of peaceful tribes during the Puget Sound War of 1855–56. In 1864, he moved to La Grande, Oregon, serving on the city council and as Union County treasurer, and in 1873 became the first resident of what is now Heppner, which he named after his business partner Henry L. Heppner, then located in Umatilla County.

Morrow was then elected to the Oregon House of Representatives, where one of his main accomplishments was the creation of Morrow County in 1885. He left the Legislature in 1887 and died in Heppner in 1899. Morrow County is named in his honor.

Morrow and his wife, Nancy McEwan of Indiana, had eight children, only one, James William Morrow, survived; he later served in the Oregon State Senate. His wife died in 1882.
