= Heppner, Oregon =

- City
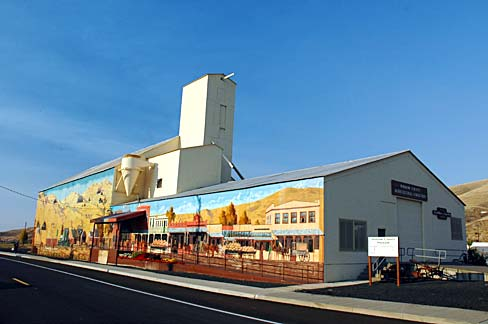
- The Agricultural Collection Building of the Morrow County Museum in Heppner

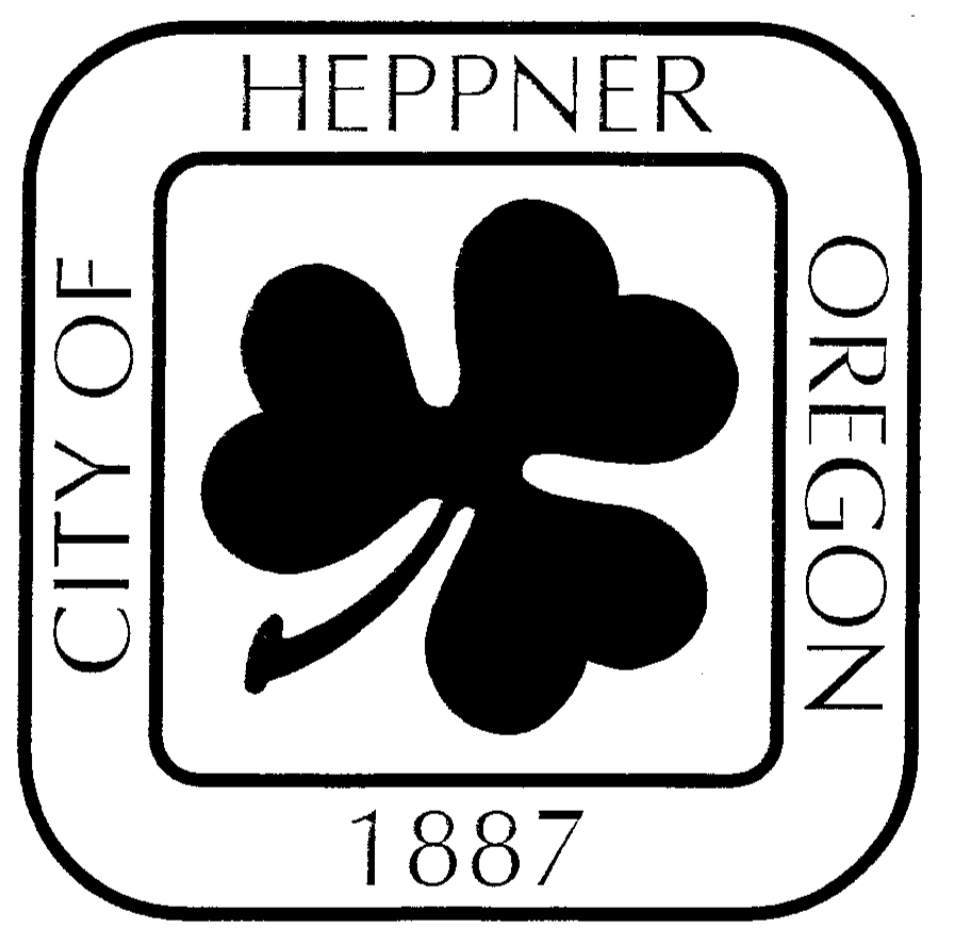
- Seal
- Nickname: Gateway to the Blues
- Location in Morrow County and the state of Oregon
- Coordinates: 45°21′17″N 119°33′21″W
- Country: United States
- State: Oregon
- County: Morrow
- Incorporated: 1887

Government
  - Mayor: Corey Sweeney

Area
  - Total: 1.24 sq mi (3.20 km^{2})
  - Land: 1.23 sq mi (3.19 km^{2})
  - Water: 0.0077 sq mi (0.02 km^{2})
- Elevation: 2,011 ft (613 m)

Population (2020)
  - Total: 1,187
  - Density: 965.2/sq mi (372.65/km^{2})
- Time zone: UTC−8 (Pacific)
  - Summer (DST): UTC−7 (Pacific)
- ZIP Code: 97836
- Area codes: 458 and 541
- FIPS code: 41-33550
- GNIS feature ID: 2410745
- Website: cityofheppner.org

Heppner is a city in and the county seat of Morrow County, Oregon, United States. As of the 2020 census, the population was 1,187, down from 1,291 in 2010. Heppner is part of the Pendleton-Hermiston Micropolitan Area. It is named after Henry Heppner, a prominent Jewish-American businessman.

== History ==
=== Native American settlement ===
Native Americans lived and traveled along the land between the Columbia Gorge and the Blue Mountains for more than 10,000 years prior to European-American settlement. Ancient petroglyphs have been found approximately 45 miles (72 km.) north of Heppner in Irrigon and Boardman. In 1855, the U.S. Government and the predominant tribes in the region—the Cayuse, Umatilla, and Walla Walla—signed a treaty whereby the tribes gave up, or ceded, to the United States more than 6.4 million acres in what is now northeastern Oregon and southeastern Washington.

=== European-American settlement ===
Prior to Heppner's founding in 1872, European-American ranchers used the area as sheep and cattle range as early as 1858. Records suggest these early cattlemen found abundant rye grass along creek bottoms.

Heppner was originally called Standsbury Flats for George W. Standsbury, one of the first European-American settlers in the area. In 1872, Colonel (Col.) Jackson Lee Morrow, a merchant, entered into a partnership with Henry Heppner, a prominent Jewish businessman, and they built a store on the crossing of the present May and Main streets. Soon thereafter, a mail and stagecoach line began operations between Pendleton and The Dalles and passed through Heppner.

Col. Jackson Lee Morrow was later elected to the Oregon legislative assembly and was instrumental in helping to carve out a new county for Heppner from neighboring Umatilla County and a portion of Wasco County. The assembly named the new county in Morrow's honor.

Heppner was designated the temporary county seat at the time the county was created and narrowly defeated nearby Lexington in an election held in 1886 to determine the permanent county seat. Heppner was incorporated in the following year on February 9, 1887.

In 1888, the Oregon Railroad and Navigation Company completed a railroad spur from the Columbia River up the Willow Creek drainage to Heppner.

The Historic Morrow County Courthouse was built in 1902-03 and is one of the oldest continuously used courthouses in Oregon. In 1985, the courthouse was listed on the National Register of Historic Places.

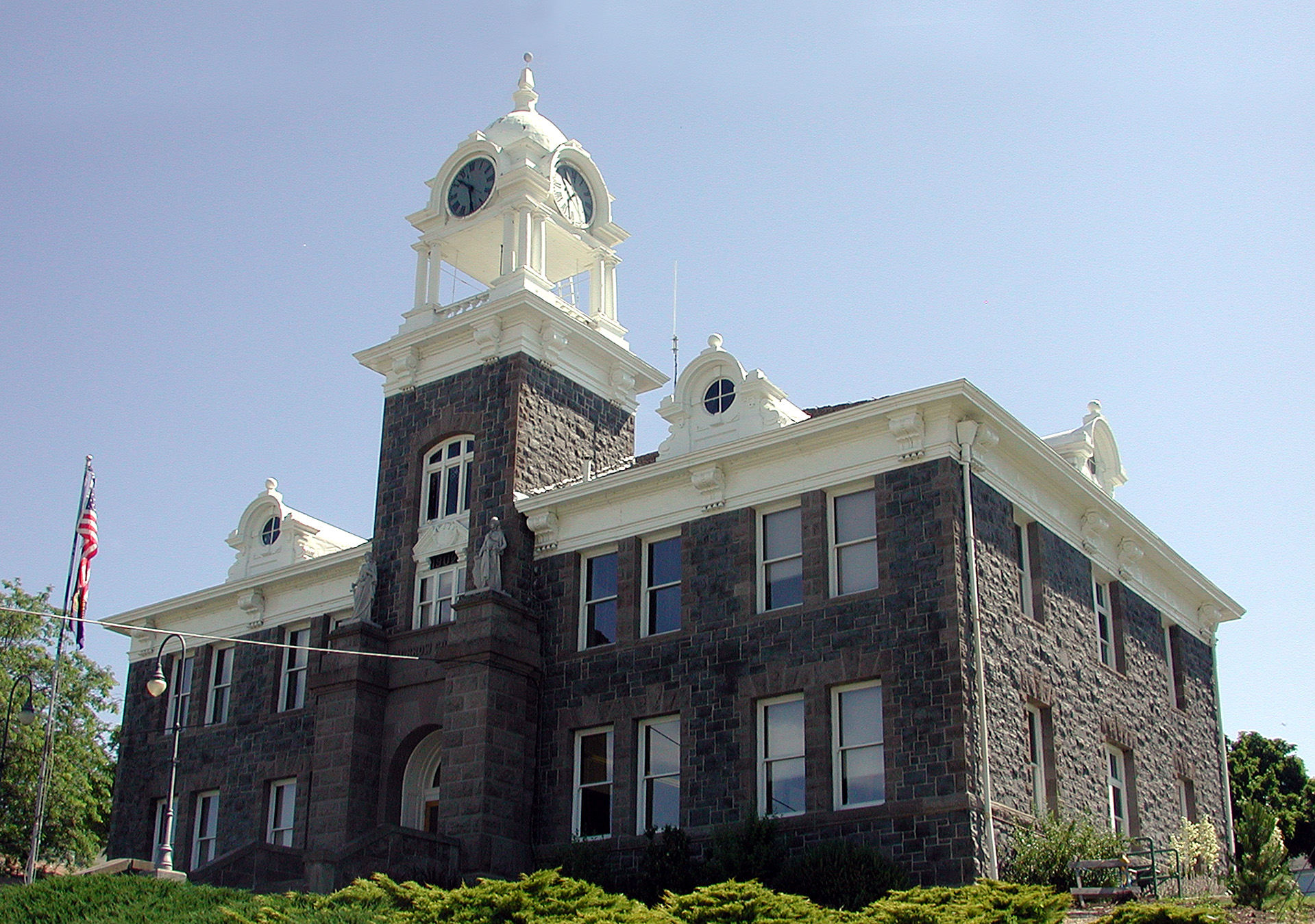
Historic Morrow County Courthouse

=== Flood of June 1903 ===
Heppner was almost destroyed by a flash flood on Sunday, June 14, 1903. The flood was precipitated by a sudden cloudburst and accompanying hail that caused a debris dam collapse and flash flooding, notably on Willow Creek. A wall of water and debris swept down the creeks and canyons and through the city. It has been estimated that 238 people (a quarter of the city's population) drowned, making it the deadliest natural disaster in Oregon's history. Property damage was reported at nearly $1 million. The nearby cities of Ione and Lexington also sustained significant damage. In 1983, the Willow Creek Dam at the outskirts of the city was finished.

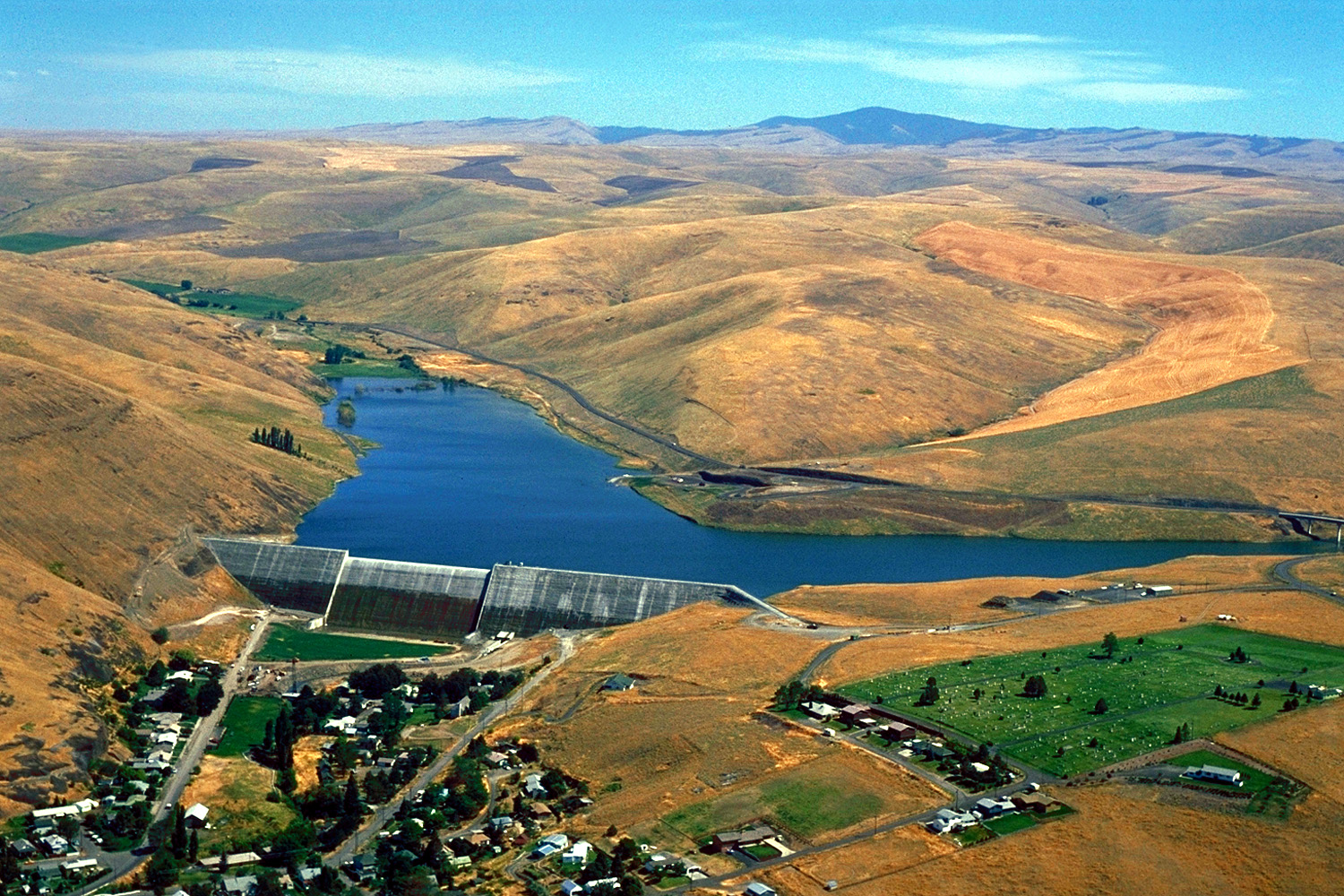
Willow Creek Lake and Dam

=== Post-flood recovery ===
The railroad and a growing network of roads had by the early decades of the 20th century made Heppner a trade center and distribution point for regional farm products including wheat, alfalfa, sheep, cattle, horses, and hogs. Despite the flood and two fires in 1918 that destroyed City Hall, the Palace Hotel, the library, many businesses, and more than 30 homes, the community rebuilt. One of its creations, the Heppner Hotel, opened in 1920 and, housing a variety of businesses over the years, it served as a community gathering place through 1972, when its last restaurant closed.

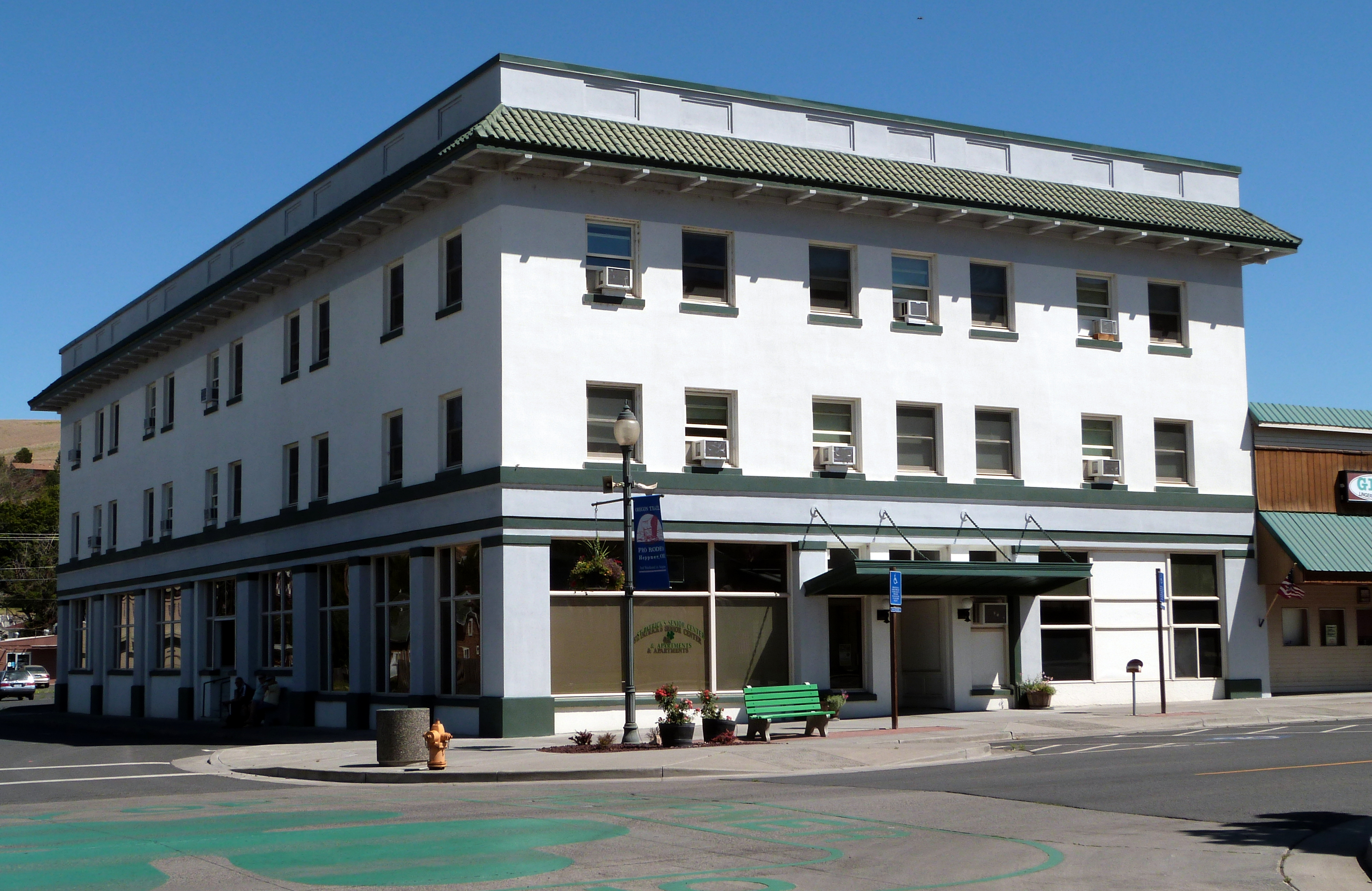
Old Heppner Hotel

=== Later history ===
In 1940, a major sawmill was built in the town by the Heppner Lumber Company, helping drive the area's economy. The mill was destroyed by fire in 1949, but was rebuilt and sold to Kinzua Lumber Company, which ultimately relocated its headquarters to Heppner. In 1999, the mill closed, dealing a significant blow to Heppner's economy and resulting in the loss of nearly 200 jobs.

== Geography ==
Heppner is in central Morrow County, between the Columbia River 35 miles (56 km) to the north and the Blue Mountains 15 miles (24 km) to the southeast. The city is along Oregon Route 74, about 60 miles (97 km) southwest of Pendleton and 180 miles (290 km) east of Portland.

Route 74 forms part of the Blue Mountain Scenic Byway, a 130-mile (210 km) set of roads connecting Interstate 84 (I-84) along the Columbia River with the North Fork John Day River in the Blue Mountains. Part of the route follows the Willow Creek drainage through Heppner.

Heppner is upstream of Lexington, Ione, and Arlington along Willow Creek. According to the U.S. Census Bureau, the city has a total area of 1.24 square miles (3.21 km^{2}), of which 0.01 square miles (0.03 km^{2}), or 0.49%, are water in Willow Creek Reservoir.

=== Climate ===
According to the Köppen Climate Classification system, Heppner has a warm-summer mediterranean climate, abbreviated "Csb" on climate maps. The hottest temperature recorded in Heppner was 110 °F (43.3 °C) on August 10, 1898, while the coldest temperature recorded was −19 °F (−28.3 °C) on January 10, 1909 and January 12, 1909.

Climate data for Heppner, Oregon, 1991–2020 normals, extremes 1893–present
Month	Jan	Feb	Mar	Apr	May	Jun	Jul	Aug	Sep	Oct	Nov	Dec	Year
Record high °F (°C)	70 (21)	75 (24)	81 (27)	92 (33)	100 (38)	109 (43)	108 (42)	110 (43)	99 (37)	92 (33)	80 (27)	75 (24)	110 (43)
Mean maximum °F (°C)	61.9 (16.6)	62.4 (16.9)	68.8 (20.4)	76.6 (24.8)	87.1 (30.6)	93.2 (34.0)	99.1 (37.3)	98.7 (37.1)	90.9 (32.7)	80.0 (26.7)	68.2 (20.1)	59.8 (15.4)	100.8 (38.2)
Mean daily maximum °F (°C)	43.6 (6.4)	47.4 (8.6)	54.7 (12.6)	60.8 (16.0)	69.4 (20.8)	76.6 (24.8)	86.8 (30.4)	86.1 (30.1)	77.3 (25.2)	63.8 (17.7)	51.0 (10.6)	42.5 (5.8)	63.3 (17.4)
Daily mean °F (°C)	35.6 (2.0)	38.3 (3.5)	44.2 (6.8)	49.3 (9.6)	56.9 (13.8)	63.1 (17.3)	71.0 (21.7)	70.4 (21.3)	62.8 (17.1)	51.7 (10.9)	41.6 (5.3)	34.9 (1.6)	51.7 (10.9)
Mean daily minimum °F (°C)	27.6 (−2.4)	29.2 (−1.6)	33.6 (0.9)	37.8 (3.2)	44.5 (6.9)	49.5 (9.7)	55.1 (12.8)	54.7 (12.6)	48.3 (9.1)	39.5 (4.2)	32.2 (0.1)	27.2 (−2.7)	39.9 (4.4)
Mean minimum °F (°C)	11.9 (−11.2)	14.2 (−9.9)	22.9 (−5.1)	27.4 (−2.6)	33.0 (0.6)	39.1 (3.9)	44.5 (6.9)	44.7 (7.1)	37.1 (2.8)	25.9 (−3.4)	17.7 (−7.9)	11.4 (−11.4)	4.3 (−15.4)
Record low °F (°C)	−19 (−28)	−18 (−28)	3 (−16)	15 (−9)	25 (−4)	31 (−1)	32 (0)	35 (2)	19 (−7)	10 (−12)	−9 (−23)	−18 (−28)	−19 (−28)
Average precipitation inches (mm)	1.32 (34)	1.07 (27)	1.36 (35)	1.46 (37)	1.71 (43)	1.35 (34)	0.31 (7.9)	0.28 (7.1)	0.43 (11)	1.17 (30)	1.37 (35)	1.26 (32)	13.09 (333)
Average snowfall inches (cm)	3.0 (7.6)	3.4 (8.6)	0.9 (2.3)	0.1 (0.25)	0.0 (0.0)	0.0 (0.0)	0.0 (0.0)	0.0 (0.0)	0.0 (0.0)	0.2 (0.51)	0.9 (2.3)	4.3 (11)	12.8 (32.56)
Average precipitation days (≥ 0.01 in)	11.0	10.1	11.8	11.0	10.2	7.2	2.7	2.3	3.7	8.6	11.7	12.1	102.4
Average snowy days (≥ 0.1 in)	2.5	2.0	0.6	0.1	0.0	0.0	0.0	0.0	0.0	0.1	0.7	2.4	8.4
Source 1: NOAA
Source 2: National Weather Service

== Demographics ==
Historical population
Census	Pop.	Note	%±
1880	318		—
1890	675		112.3%
1900	1,146		69.8%
1910	880		−23.2%
1920	1,324		50.5%
1930	1,190		−10.1%
1940	1,140		−4.2%
1950	1,648		44.6%
1960	1,661		0.8%
1970	1,429		−14.0%
1980	1,498		4.8%
1990	1,412		−5.7%
2000	1,395		−1.2%
2010	1,291		−7.5%
2020	1,187		−8.1%

=== 2020 census ===
As of the 2020 census, Heppner had a population of 1,187. The median age was 46.0 years. 21.5% of residents were under the age of 18 and 25.5% of residents were 65 years of age or older. For every 100 females there were 98.2 males, and for every 100 females age 18 and over there were 95.8 males age 18 and over.

There were 533 households in Heppner, of which 22.7% had children under the age of 18 living in them. Of all households, 44.7% were married-couple households, 22.0% were households with a male householder and no spouse or partner present, and 26.5% were households with a female householder and no spouse or partner present. About 36.9% of all households were made up of individuals and 19.2% had someone living alone who was 65 years of age or older.

There were 608 housing units, of which 12.3% were vacant. Among occupied housing units, 65.5% were owner-occupied and 34.5% were renter-occupied. The homeowner vacancy rate was 3.6% and the rental vacancy rate was 8.0%.

According to the 2020 Decennial Census Demographic and Housing Characteristics profile, 0% of residents lived in urban areas, while 100.0% lived in rural areas.

Racial composition as of the 2020 census
Race	Number	Percent
White	1,039	87.5%
Black or African American	3	0.3%
American Indian and Alaska Native	10	0.8%
Asian	4	0.3%
Native Hawaiian and Other Pacific Islander	0	0%
Some other race	36	3.0%
Two or more races	95	8.0%
Hispanic or Latino (of any race)	94	7.9%

=== 2010 Census ===
As of the census of 2010, there were 1,291 people, 559 households, and 370 families residing in the city. The population density was 1,049.6 inhabitants per square mile (405.3/km^{2}). There were 647 housing units at an average density of 526.0 per square mile (203.1/km^{2}). The racial makeup of the city was 92.5% White, 0.2% African American, 1.2% Native American, 0.3% Asian, 2.6% from other races, and 3.3% from two or more races. Hispanic or Latino of any race were 3.7% of the population.

There were 559 households, of which 26.1% had children under the age of 18 living with them, 53.3% were married couples living together, 8.2% had a female householder with no husband present, 4.7% had a male householder with no wife present, and 33.8% were non-families. 29.3% of all households were made up of individuals, and 14.5% had someone living alone who was 65 years of age or older. The average household size was 2.30 and the average family size was 2.78.

The median age in the city was 45.9 years. 22.5% of residents were under the age of 18; 6.5% were between the ages of 18 and 24; 19.6% were from 25 to 44; 29.8% were from 45 to 64; and 21.5% were 65 years of age or older. The gender makeup of the city was 50.6% male and 49.4% female.

=== 2000 Census ===
As of the census of 2000, there were 1,395 people, 583 households, and 398 families residing in the city. The population density was 1,138.5 inhabitants per square mile (439.6/km^{2}). There were 660 housing units at an average density of 538.7 per square mile (208.0/km^{2}). The racial makeup of the city was 96.70% White, 1.00% Native American, 0.43% Asian, 1.51% from other races, and 0.36% from two or more races. Hispanic or Latino of any race were 1.58% of the population.

There were 583 households, out of which 28.8% had children under the age of 18 living with them, 56.6% were married couples living together, 7.5% had a female householder with no husband present, and 31.7% were non-families. 28.1% of all households were made up of individuals, and 14.8% had someone living alone who was 65 years of age or older. The average household size was 2.36 and the average family size was 2.88.

In the city, the population was spread out, with 24.5% under the age of 18, 5.9% from 18 to 24, 24.3% from 25 to 44, 24.9% from 45 to 64, and 20.3% who were 65 years of age or older. The median age was 42 years. For every 100 females, there were 100.7 males. For every 100 females age 18 and over, there were 92.9 males.

The median income for a household in the city was $33,421, and the median income for a family was $42,500. Males had a median income of $37,381 versus $20,714 for females. The per capita income for the city was $16,729. About 11.1% of families and 13.9% of the population were below the poverty line, including 18.9% of those under age 18 and 7.0% of those age 65 or over.

== Annual cultural events ==
Heppner hosts an annual "A Wee Bit O'Ireland" celebration around Saint Patrick's Day. The city also hosts the annual Blue Mountain Century Bikeway, a scenic bicycle ride loop of approximately 108 miles starting and ending in Heppner.

== Economy and education ==
As of 2002, the five largest employers in Heppner were Morrow County, the Morrow County Health District, the Morrow County School District, the Heppner Ranger District, and the Bank of Eastern Oregon.

Heppner is served by the Morrow School District, which includes Heppner Junior/Senior High School and Heppner Elementary. Heppner is also served by the Heppner Branch of the Oregon Trail Library District, part of Oregon's Sage Library System.

== Government ==
=== Local ===
Heppner is a municipal corporation with the official name City of Heppner per the 1996 Heppner Charter. The powers of the city are vested in the city council which consists of a mayor and six council members each nominated and elected from the city at large or, in case of one or more vacancies in the council, the council members whose offices are not vacant. The mayor serves two-year terms and the council members serve four-year terms. Heppner also maintains a city manager who is appointed by, and may be removed by, a majority of the entire city council. The appointment of city manager is made without regard to political considerations and solely on the basis of administrative qualifications. The mayor votes as a council member with no appointive powers.

As of 2023, Corey Sweeney serves as mayor. Council members include Ralph Klock, Ian Murray, Cody High, Dale Bates, Sharon Inskeep, and Adam Doherty. John Doherty serves as the City Manager.

=== State ===
Heppner is part of Oregon State House District 57 which includes Gilliam, Morrow, Sherman, Umatilla, and Wasco counties and of Oregon State Senate District 29 which includes Gilliam, Morrow Sherman, Umatilla, Union, Wallowa, and parts of Wasco counties. As of September 2017, Representative Greg Smith (R) serves Heppner in the Oregon State House and Senator Bill Hansell (R) serves Heppner in the Oregon State Senate.

=== Federal ===
Heppner is part of Oregon's Second Congressional District. As of January 2023, Heppner is represented by U.S. Rep. Cliff Bentz (R). Separately, congressional senators for Oregon include Jeff Merkley (D) and Ron Wyden (D).

== Notable people ==
- John Kilkenny, Judge, U.S. District Court for the District of Oregon and Judge, U.S. Court of Appeals for the Ninth Circuit
- Greg Smith, Oregon State Representative, District 57
