= Index of Oregon-related articles =

The location of the state of Oregon in the United States of America

The following is an alphabetical list of articles related to the U.S. state of Oregon.

The list serves as a navigation index to Oregon-related topics as a companion to Category:Oregon. Topics listed as "category" link to category pages where one can browse all articles marked with that category. Topics listed as "commons category" link to Wikimedia Commons pages containing images and other media files relating to that topic. Topics listed as "subsection" link to a subsection of a main article. All other topics link to articles or lists directly relating to the topic.

== A ==
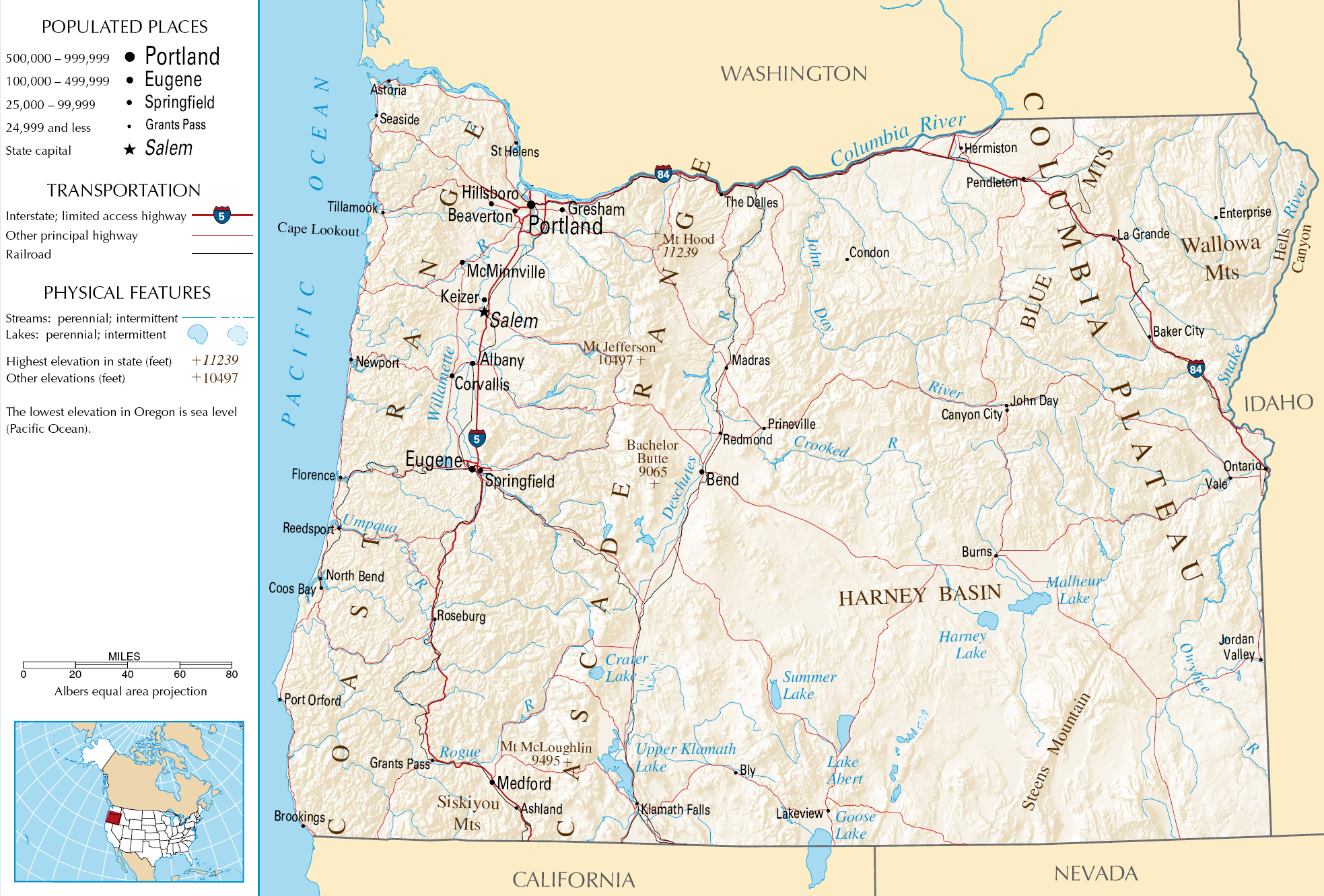
An enlargeable map of the state of Oregon

- Agencies, state
- Agriculture
  - Agriculture (category)
  - Agriculture (commons category)
- Airports
  - Airports, private-use
- Alcohol
- Amphibians and reptiles of Oregon
- Amusement parks (category)
- Aquaria (category)
- Arboreta (category)
- Arches, natural (category)
- Archaeology
  - Archaeological sites (category)
- Architecture (see Buildings and structures)
- Art museums and galleries (category)
- Astronomical observatories (category)
- Attorney General, Oregon

== B ==
- Ballot measures
- Beaches
  - Beaches (category)
  - Beaches (commons category)
- Beer
  - Breweries (category)
- Bird, state
- Birds
- Bridges (category)
  - Bridges, covered
- Buildings and structures (category)

== C ==
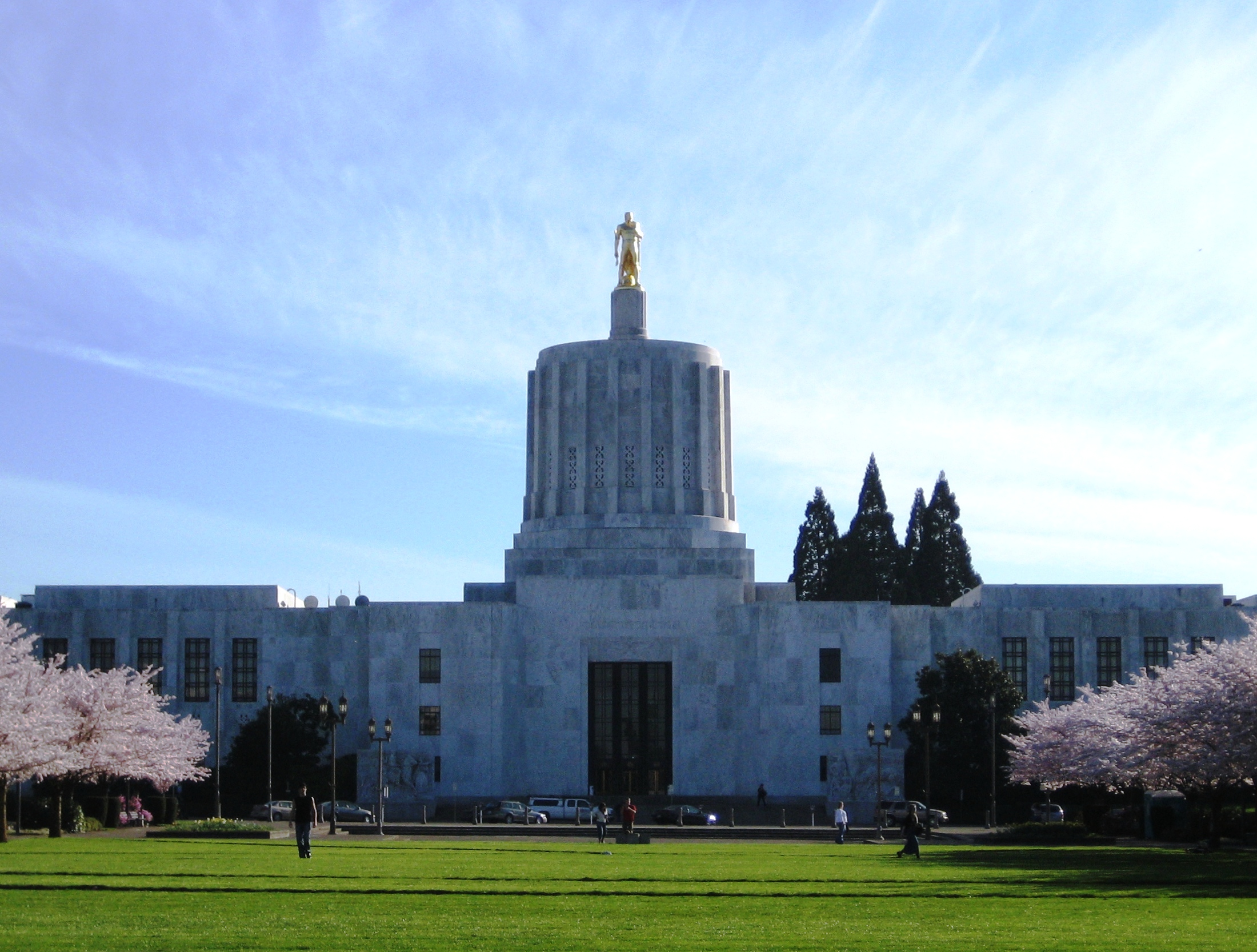
The Oregon State Capitol in Salem

- Cannabis
- Canyons and gorges (category)
- Capital, State
  - Salem 1859–
- Capital, Territorial
  - Corvallis, 1855
  - Oregon City, 1848–1851
  - Salem, 1851–1855 and 1855–1859
- Capitol Building
  - Capitol Building (commons category)
- Casinos (category)
- Caves (category)
- Census statistical areas
- Christianity (category)
- Cities
  - Cities (commons category)
- Civil War units, Oregon
- Climate (subsection)
- Colleges and universities
  - Colleges and Universities (commons category)
  - Colleges, community
- Communications (category)
- Communities, unincorporated
- Community colleges
- Companies (category)
- Congressional districts
  - Congressional delegations
- Constitution

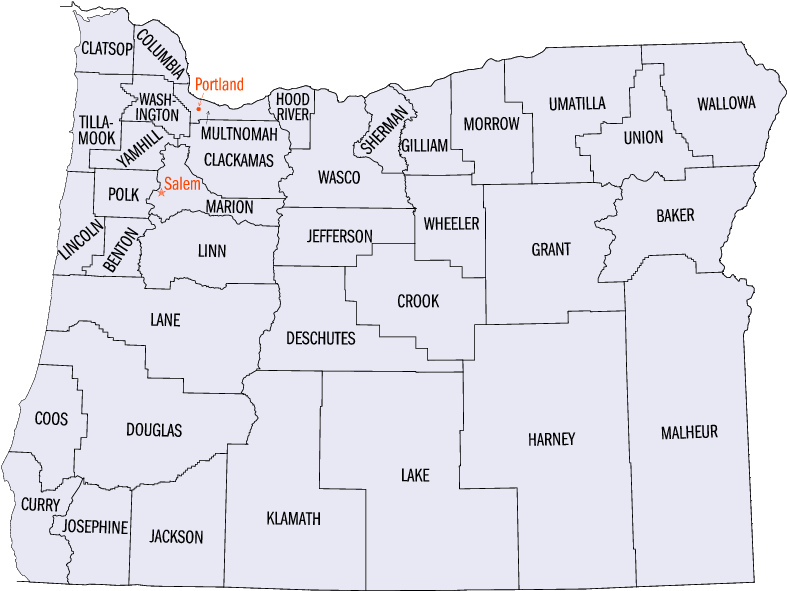
An enlargeable map of the 36 counties of Oregon

- Controlled substances
- Convention centers (category)
- Counties
  - Counties (commons category)
  - County name etymologies
- Court, United States District
- Court of Appeals, Ninth Circuit
- Cuisine
- Culture
  - Culture (category)

== D ==
- Dams and reservoirs
- Demographics
- District Court, United States
- Drugs (see Controlled substances)

== E ==
- Economy
  - Economy (category)
  - Economy (commons category)
- Education (subsection)
  - Education (category)
- Elections
  - Elections (category)
  - Elections (commons category)
- Environment (category)
- Etymology, state name
  - Etymologies, county names
  - Executions
- Executive branch, State of Oregon (subsection)

== F ==
The Flag of Oregon

- Festivals (category)
- Flag
- Flower, State
- Forts
  - Forts (category)
  - Forts (commons category)
- Forests (category)
  - Forests, National (category)
  - Forests, State

== G ==
- Galleries and art museums (category)
- Gardens (category)
  - Gardens, botanical (category)
- Geography
  - Geography (category)
  - Geography (commons category)
- Geology
  - Geology (category)
- Ghost towns
  - Ghost towns (category)
- Glaciers (category)
- GLOBIO
- Golf clubs and courses (category)
- Government, State
  - Government (category)
  - Government (commons category)
- Government, Provisional
- Government, Territorial
  - Legislature, Territorial
    - Legislators, Territorial
    - Officials, Territorial (category)
- Governor
  - Governors, list of

== H ==
- Heritage railroads (category)
- High schools
- Higher education
- Highways, state
  - Highways, state (category)
  - Highways, named state
  - Highway route numbers
- Hiking trails (category)
- Historic Landmarks, National
- Historic places, registered
  - Historic places, registered (category)
- History
  - Historical outline
  - History (category)
  - History (commons category)
  - History, indigenous peoples (subsection)
  - History, pioneer
- Hospitals
  - Hospitals (category)
- Hot springs (category)
- House of Representatives

== I ==
- Images (category)
  - Images (commons category)
- Indian reservations
- Indian wars
  - Nez Perce War
- Islands
  - Islands (category)

== J ==
- Jails
- Judges
  - Judges, Oregon State (category)
  - Judges, Oregon Supreme Court (category)
  - Judges, Territorial (category)
- Judicial branch, Government of Oregon

== L ==
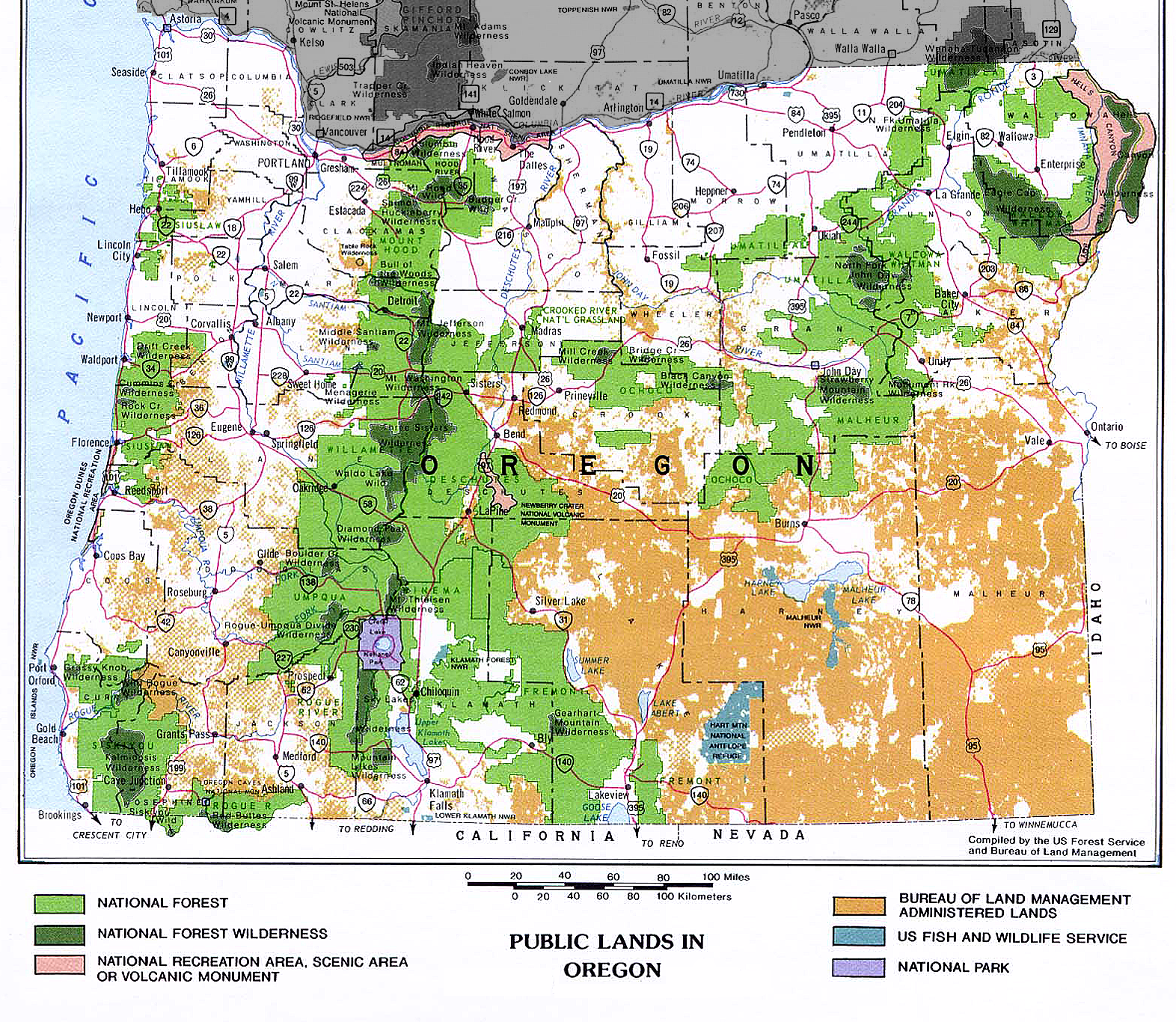
Map of federal land usage in Oregon. National Forest National Forest wilderness National Recreation Area, Scenic Area, or Volcanic Monument Bureau of Land Management administered lands U.S. Fish and Wildlife Service National Park

- Lakes
  - Lakes (category)
  - Lakes (commons category)
- Landmarks (category)
- Law (category)
  - Law enforcement agencies
- Legislative branch, Government of Oregon
  - Legislature, State
- Lighthouses (category)
  - Lighthouses, Oregon Coast
- Lists

== M ==
- Maps (category)
  - Maps (commons category)
- Mass media (category)
- Methamphetamine (section)
- Monuments and memorials (category)
- Mountains
  - Mountains (category)
  - Mountains (commons category)
- Mountain ranges
  - Mountain ranges (category)
- Museums
  - Museums (category)
  - Museums (commons category)
- Music
- Musical groups (category)
- Musicians (category)

== N ==
- National forests (category)
  - National Forests (commons category)
- National monuments (category)
- Native American tribes
  - Native American tribes (category)
  - Native American tribal entities
- Native plants
- Natural gas pipelines (category)
- Natural history
  - Natural history (category)
- Newspapers

== O ==
- Observatories, astronomical (category)
- Oregon
  - Oregon (category)
  - Oregon (commons category)
- Oregon Ballot Measures 68 and 69 (2010)
- Oregon boundary dispute, 1844–1846
- Oregon Country, 1818–1846
- Oregon Society of Certified Public Accountants
- Oregon State Capitol
- Oregon State Leather Contest
- Oregon Territory, 1848–1859
- Oregon Trail
- Outdoor sculptures (category)

== P ==
- Pacific Northwest Waterways Association
- Parks (category)
  - State parks
  - State parks (category)
- People
  - People (category)
  - People (commons category)
  - People by populated place
  - People by county
  - People by occupation
- Plants, native
- Politics
  - Politics (category)
  - Political parties
- Populated places (category)
  - Census-designated places (category)
  - Cities (category)
  - Unincorporated communities (category)
  - Villages (category)
- Power stations
- Prisons
- Protected areas (category)
- Provisional Government, 1843–1848

== R ==
- Radio stations
- Railroad museums (category)
- Railroads
- Registered historic places
  - Registered historic places (commons category)
- Religion
  - Religion (category)
- Representatives, State
- Representatives, United States
- Rivers
  - Rivers (category)
  - Rivers (commons category)
- Rock formations (category)

== S ==
The Oregon State Seal

- Scenic highways (category)
- Schools
  - Boarding schools (category)
  - Elementary (category)
  - High schools
    - High schools (category)
  - Middle schools (category)
  - Private schools (category)
- School districts
  - School districts (category)
- Scouting
- Seal, Oregon State
- Secretary of State, Oregon
- Senate, Oregon State
- Senators, United States
- Settlements (see Populated places)
  - Ghost towns (category)
- Sister states (subsection)
- Ski areas and resorts (category)
- Solar power
- Sports
  - Sports (category)
  - Sports (commons category)
  - Sports venues (category)
- State Capitol, Oregon
- State Highways
- Supreme Court, Oregon
- State forests
- State parks
  - State parks (category)
  - State parks (commons category)
- State prisons
- Structures (category)
  - Structures (commons category)
- Supreme Court, Oregon
- Symbols
  - Symbols (commons category)

== T ==
- Television shows set in Oregon (category)
- Television stations
- Territory, Oregon
- Theatres (category)
- Tourism (category)
- Transportation
  - Transportation (subsection)
  - Transportation (category)
  - Transportation (commons category)
- Treasurer, Oregon State
- Treaties
  - Adams-Onís Treaty
  - Anglo-American Convention of 1818
  - Oregon Treaty
- Tree, state

== U ==
- Universities
  - Universities and colleges (commons category)

== V ==
- Vineyards and wineries
- Volcanoes (category)

== W ==
- Waterfalls (category)
  - Waterfalls (commons category)
- Wine
  - Wineries and vineyards
- Writers (category)
- Wind power

== Z ==
- Zoos (category)
  - Zoos (commons category)

== See also ==
- Topic overview:
  - Oregon
  - Outline of Oregon
