= Golden Hills Wind Project =

Wind farm in Oregon, United States

- Country: United States
- Location: Sherman County, Oregon
- Coordinates: 45°35′21″N 120°44′12″W
- Status: Commissioned 2022
- Owner: BP Alternative Energy

Power generation
- Units operational: 41 x 4.3 MW Vestas V150 10 x 2.5 MW GE 116
- Nameplate capacity: 200 megawatts

Golden Hills Wind Project is a electricity generating wind farm facility in Sherman County, Oregon. The original plan in 2009 by BP Alternative Energy was to generate a peak of 400 megawatts, with an average of 133 MW of wind power across 200,000 acres (81,000 ha) using up to 267 wind turbines. A new plan with 51 turbines generating 200 MW was expected to begin construction in 2021. It began operation in 2022.

== See also ==
- List of wind farms in the United States
- Wind power in Oregon
