= Shepherds Flat Wind Farm =

Wind farm in Oregon, USA

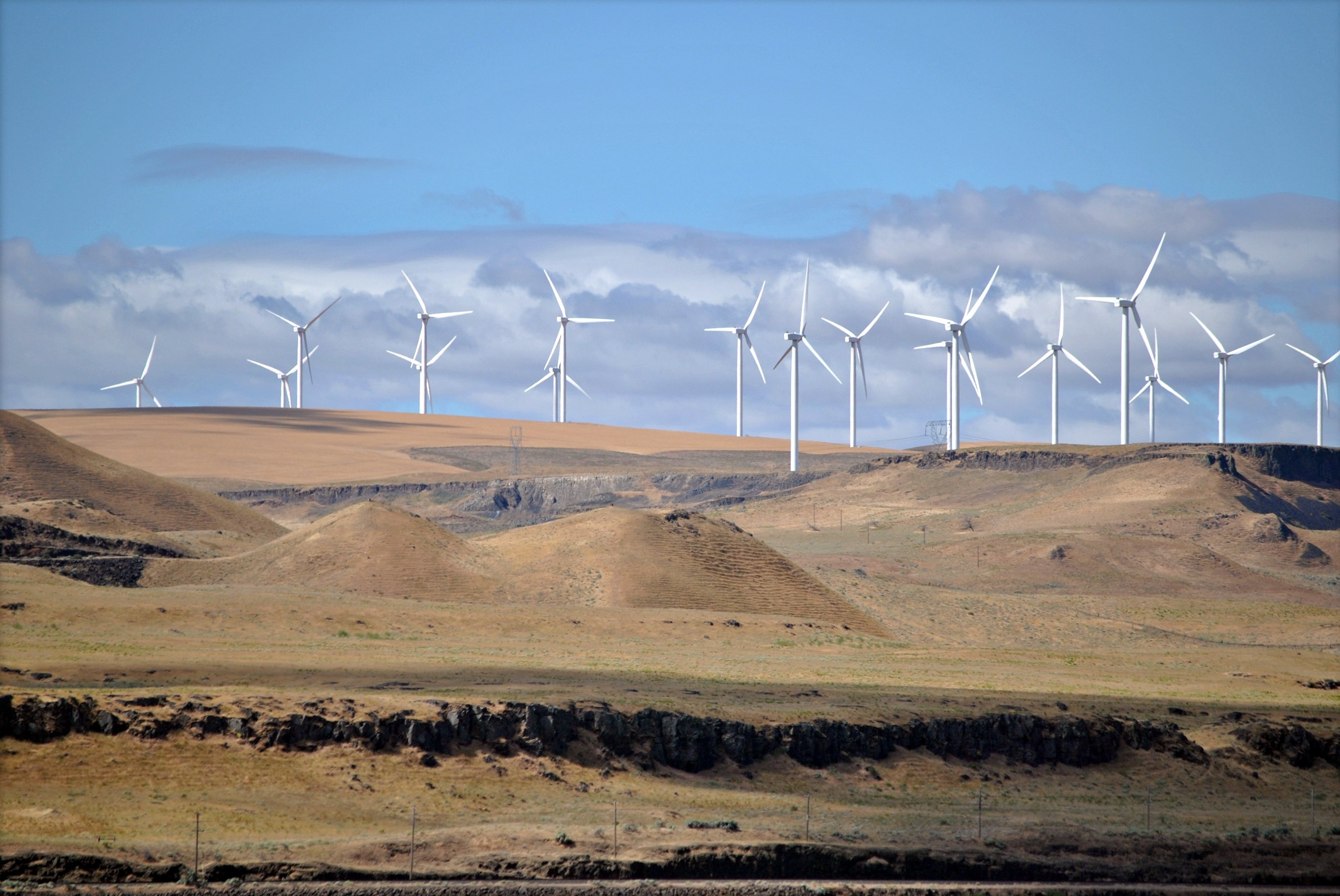
- Country: United States
- Location: Near Arlington, Oregon
- Coordinates: 45°42′N 120°06′W
- Status: Operational
- Construction began: 2009
- Commission date: 2012
- Owners: Sumitomo Corporation of Americas; Tyr Energy; Caithness Energy; GE; Google

Wind farm
- Type: Onshore
- Rotor diameter: 100 m (330 ft)

Power generation
- Units operational: 338 × 2.5 MW
- Make and model: GE Wind Energy 2.5xl (338)
- Nameplate capacity: 845 MW
- Capacity factor: 22.7% (average 2013-2017)
- Annual net output: 1,677 GW·h

The Shepherds Flat Wind Farm is an 845 megawatt (MW) wind farm in the eastern part of U.S. state of Oregon, near Arlington, in both Gilliam and Morrow counties. Groundbreaking occurred in 2009, and it officially opened in September 2012.

The wind farm was built by Caithness Energy using General Electric GE2.5XL 2.5 MW wind turbines, and it supplies electricity to Southern California Edison. The wind farm is estimated to have an economic impact of $16 million annually for Oregon. It is one of the largest land-based wind farms in the world.

== Details ==
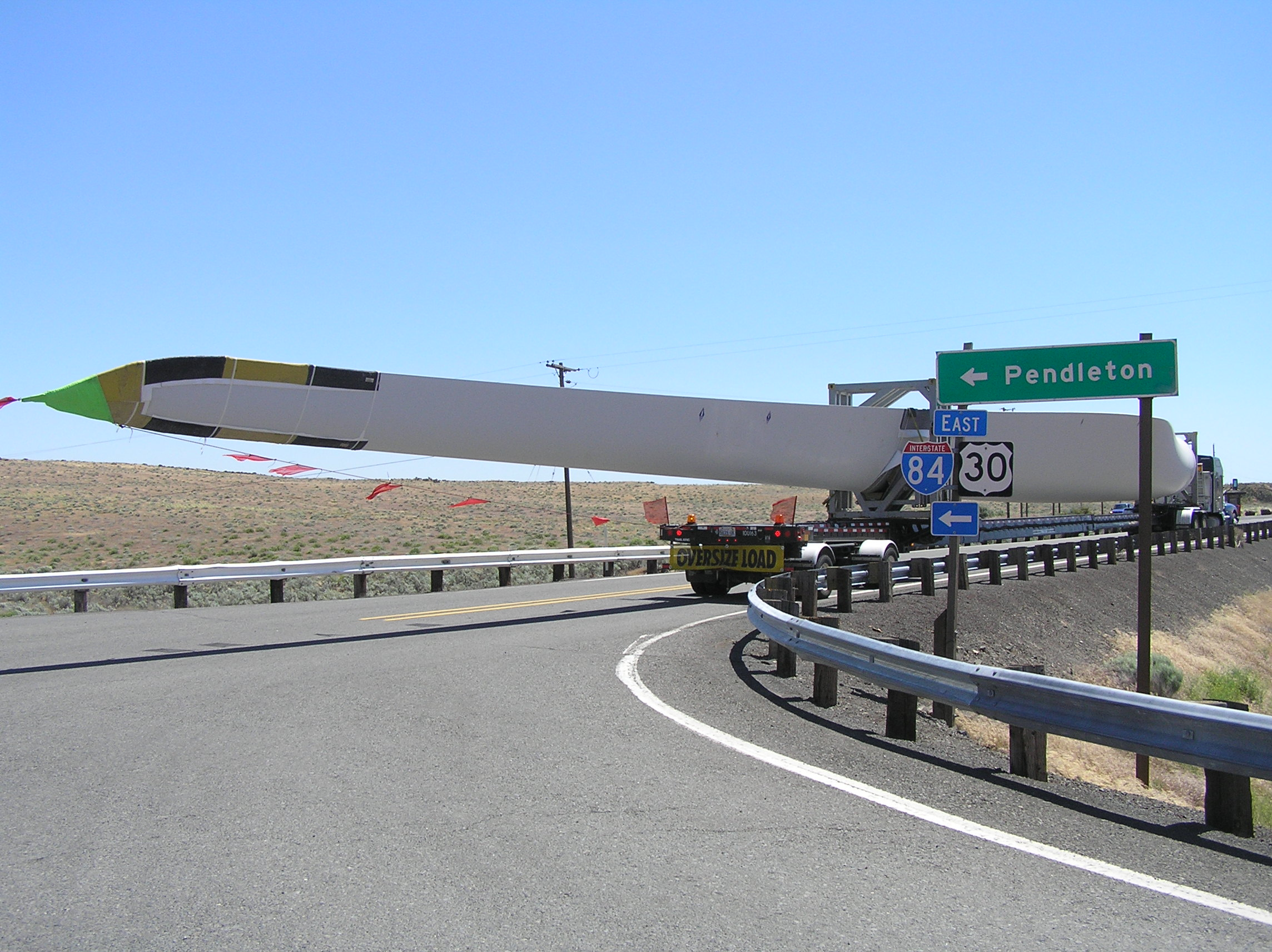
Delivery of a turbine blade, 2011

The wind farm is located in eastern Oregon in both Morrow and Gilliam counties, with the majority of the turbines in the latter. Oregon provided tax incentives to the developer to help land the facility, but the project is expected to provide Gilliam County with about $5 million annually in taxes and fees when it is operating. Shepherds Flat is entirely on private property approximately 5 miles (8.0 km) southeast of the city of Arlington between Oregon Route 19 and Oregon Route 74. Construction on the project was expected to employ 400 people to build 90 miles (140 km) of power lines and 85 miles (137 km) of roads on the 30-square-mile (78 km^{2}) wind farm.

Plans for the project first came in 2002 for a 105 megawatt project, with the plan changed to larger project in 2004. The project was then submitted to the state in 2006 with plans to have the first phase online in 2008. Early plans called for 303 turbines and a generating capacity of 909 megawatts. At the time, it would have doubled the capacity for wind-generated power in Oregon. The farm is divided into several sections, with the Willow Creek Wind Farm between two of the larger segments.

Approved in 2008 by state regulators, groundbreaking came in 2009. The project design now includes 338 GE2.5XL turbines built by GE Wind Energy, each with a capacity to produce 2.5 megawatts, and used for the first time in United States. These turbines and a ten-year service contract cost a total of $1.4 billion, the largest expense on the estimated $2 billion project. In December 2010, the Department of Energy (DOE) offered a $1.3 billion loan guarantee for the project. The insurance fee for the loan guarantee would be paid from federal stimulus money through the Financial Institution Partnership Program. Generating capacity will be 845 megawatts, producing an estimated 2 billion kWh each year, enough to provide electricity to 235,000 homes. Once operational, the facility will have about 35 permanent employees. The wind farm is estimated to have an economic benefit of $16 million annually for Oregon.

In April 2011, Google announced they had invested $100 million in the project, part of a $500 million investment package announced by General Electric and including as investors, also, subsidiaries of Itochu Corp. and Sumitomo Corporation. The facility was officially opened on September 22, 2012.

== Electricity production ==
Shepherds Flat Wind Farm Generation (MW·h)
Year	North Hurlburt 265 MW Unit	South Hurlburt 290 MW Unit	Horseshoe Bend 290 MW Unit	Total Annual MW·h
2012	485,355	214,587	-	699,942
2013	542,117	585,493	612,275	1,739,885
2014	580,941	601,495	652,343	1,834,779
2015	489,302	535,373	568,072	1,592,747
2016	550,227	585,383	612,344	1,747,954
2017	458,684	492,996	519,051	1,470,731
Average Annual Production (years 2013–2017)				1,677,219

== Concerns ==
Concerns have been raised by taxpayer watchdog groups, that ranch owners receive up to $12,000 annually per turbine leased on their land, while they have already received tens of millions of dollars in government subsidies. Some local ranchers due to benefit or already benefiting from the partially government subsidized wind energy projects received nearly $1 million in government subsidies in 2008 alone.

== See also ==
- Biglow Canyon Wind Farm
- Wind power in the United States
- Wind power in Oregon
- List of onshore wind farms
