= Guernsey Power Station =

Natural gas power plant in Guernsey County, Ohio

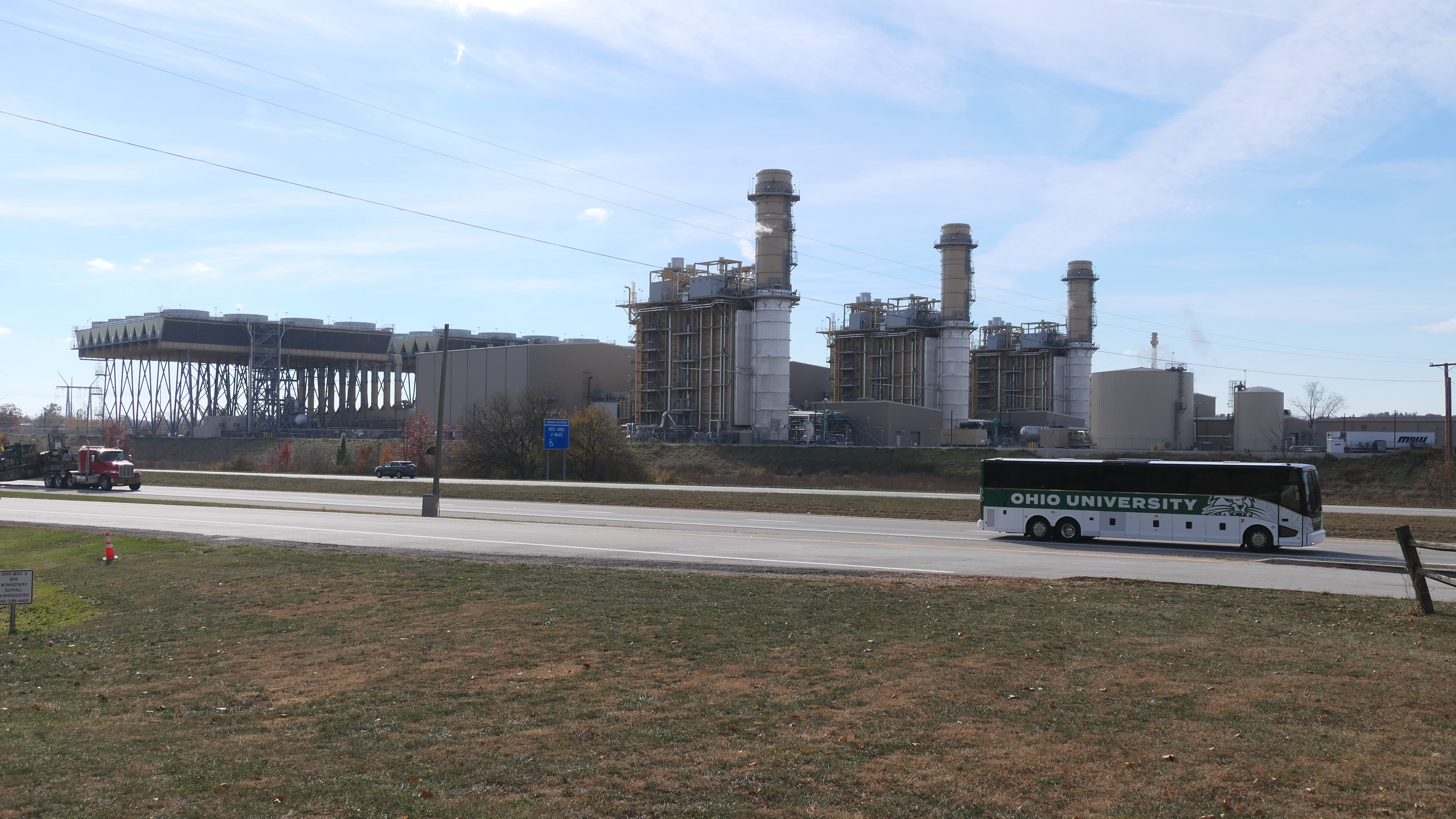
- Located adjacent to Interstate 77, photo from I-77 NB Rest Stop at mile marker 39
- Country: United States
- Location: Valley Township, Ohio
- Coordinates: 39°56′15″N 81°32′06.1″W
- Status: Open
- Construction began: 2019
- Commission date: 2023
- Construction cost: $1.7 B
- Owner: Talen Energy
- Operator: EthosEnergy
- Combined cycle?: Yes

Power generation
- Units operational: 3 x 625 MW
- Make and model: GE 7HA.02 Gas Turbine
- Annual net output: 10.9 TWh

External links
- Website: https://www.talenenergy.com/plant/guernsey-power-station/
- Commons: Related media on Commons

Guernsey Power Station is a privately owned gas-fired power plant located in Guernsey County, Ohio south of Byesville in the heart of the Utica and Marcellus shale region. It generates 1.875 GW of power, currently the 67th largest power station in the United States.

The electric generating facility sells energy and capacity into the Pennsylvania-New Jersey-Maryland Interconnection (PJM) market. PJM is the regional transmission organization that coordinates the movement of wholesale electricity in 13 states, including Ohio.

The facility uses three GE advanced gas turbines, producing electricity equivalent to the power needs of approximately 1.4 million homes. Plant construction cost $1.7 billion and at that time (anno 2021) was:

- the United States' largest natural-gas powered plant built in a single phase and
- the United States' largest plant using the single shaft combined-cycle configuration, employing dual turbine generator technology, first stage being natural gas-powered, then waste heat steam-powered.

== History ==
The Guernsey Power Station, LLC (GPS) is a natural gas-fired power plant owned by Talen Energy. It was developed by Apex Power Group, LLC, formed in 2007, and Caithness Energy. Gemma Power Systems, a subsidiary of Argan, Inc., was responsible for engineering, procurement and construction of the plant.

Key to GPS' location in Valley Township was access to Utica and Marcellus shale natural gas, offering a price competitive, environmentally friendly fuel source. The power plant sits atop a depleted former coal mine, its acreage transected by the Rockies Express East natural gas pipeline and near AEP Ohio (AEP)'s Kammer–Vassell overhead transmission lines linking with PJM's 765 kV interstate network, providing convenient commercial tie-ins.

In Spring 2016, Apex Power Group, LLC presented public meetings to Guernsey County residents explaining the GPS project. Construction was expected to create up to 1,000 temporary jobs with taxes paid benefitting the local community. Plans were included to fund new buildings at Byesville, Ohio's Meadowbrook High School. Rolling Hills school district officials planned this upgrade after developers agreed future GPS tax revenues would pay the district’s 40% share of a contract with the Ohio Facilities Construction Commission, local taxpayers thus having no tax burden for Meadowbrook's new construction.

Regulatory filings were submitted in 2016 for construction of a natural gas-fired power plant capable of generating 1100 megawatts, using two high-efficiency combustion turbines. The plans were postponed, during which time the project's scope increased to include a third turbine, raising total capacity to 1.875 GW maximum output. On January 31, 2019, GPS authorized Gemma to start preliminary design and site preparation activities. Site prep was allocated six months' time and 10–12% of the entire project budget.

CTL Engineering Inc. of Morgantown, West Virginia, planned the drilling grid patterns required for site stabilization per Ohio Environmental Protection Agency’s Underground Injection Control (UIC) Program. Two separate grids were needed on the 118-acre tract, foundation preparations for the power generating facility and a new off-site AEP 765KV switchyard. Howard Concrete Pumping provided mine mitigation, injecting approximately 200,000 cubic yards of grout into acres of subterranean cavities, leavings of century-old underground mining activities.

In May 2019, the Federal Energy Regulatory Commission approved the request and by September 2019 three GE 7HA.02 gas turbines had been ordered. Construction began 3rd quarter 2019. GPS developers paid for extension of municipal water and sewer lines from Byesville to the site, GPS to subsequently purchase those services from the village. Connection between the plant and onsite 42" natural gas pipeline was subcontracted to Aspire Energy Express LLC, an Ohio subsidiary of Chesapeake Utilities Corporation. The branch connection was designed to provide up to 300,000 Dekatherms/day (~300,200 MMBtu/day) with end-point metering and pressure regulation. Baker Concrete Construction provided foundations for the new construction.

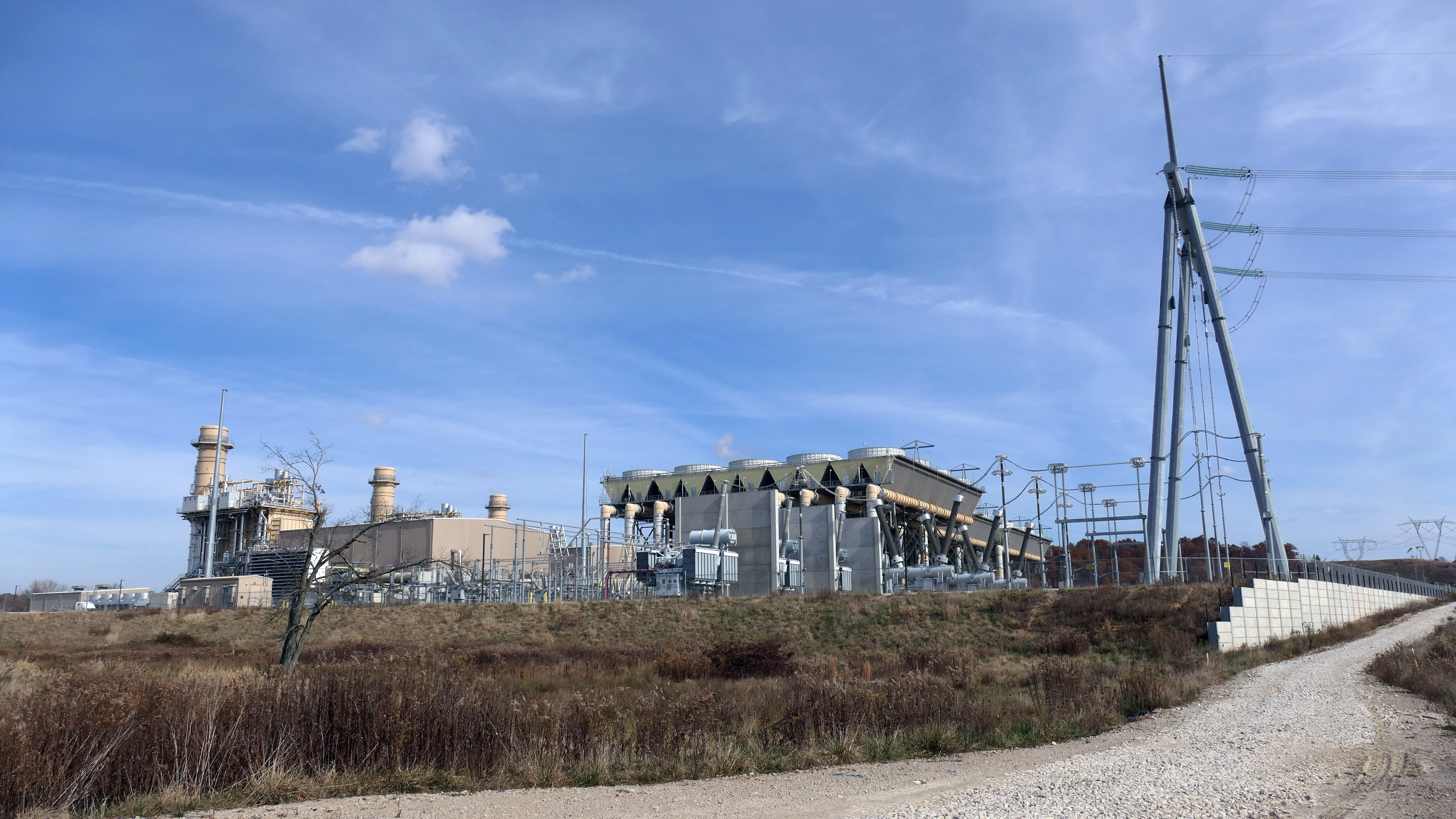
GPS' switchyard and AEP's 765 kV transmission line tie-in, SW view

EPC Services Company, a subsidiary of Electrical Consultants Inc., provided design-build support for the plant's onsite switchyard, where 230 kV lines from the turbines merge into a collector bus and are stepped-up to 765 kV via auto transformers. Local Derwent-based Bi-Con Engineering, LLC, installed metering stations. GPS' switchyard output feeds a new AEP substation located on a 1200’ x 500’ pad near the plant, Aka Guernsey 765 kV Switching Station, which then connects via two 0.3-mile 765-kV transmission line sections to the east- and west-bound legs of the Kammer–Vassell line, respectively. (The Kammer substation lies SW of Wheeling, West Virginia; Vassell, N of Columbus, Ohio). All tie-in and substation expenses were funded by GPS' developers with ownership transferred to AEP upon completion.

GPS began live operation in February 2023 and commercial operation on April 7, 2023. Its construction phase provided an average of 300 jobs with highs of 1,000 during construction peaks. Its ongoing 24/7 in-service operation requires 29 permanent high-tech jobs to maintain operation. Additional labor for scheduled spring and fall shutdowns will require between 100–300 contractor employees on an ongoing semiannual basis for maintenance and reequipping.

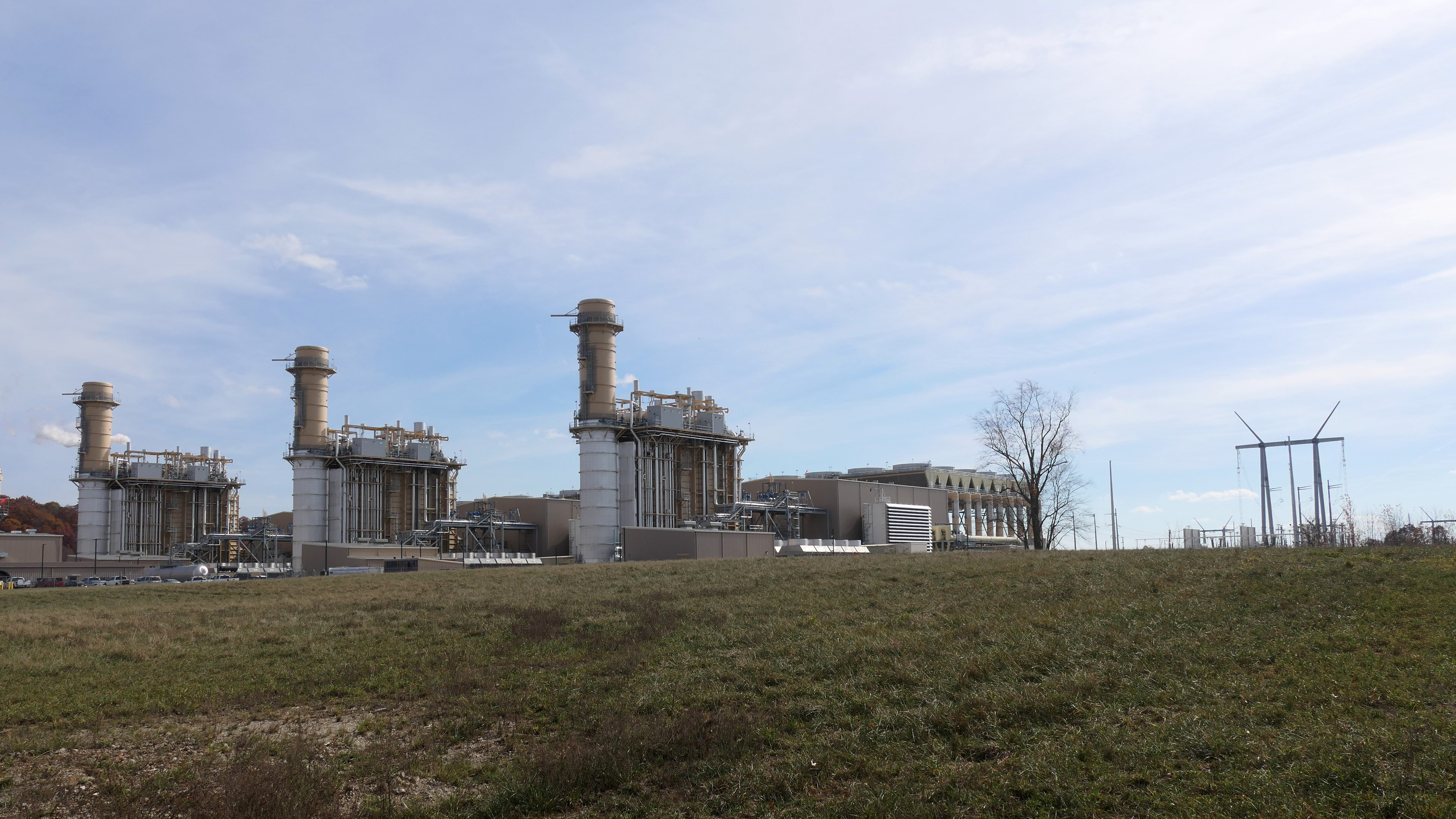
GPS has 3 tandem natural gas-fired generation units, NW view

== Operation ==
The GPS facility is a scaled system of three identical power units, each employing a GE 7HA.02 gas turbine with a GE W84 generator and a GE STF-A650 steam turbine paired with a water/hydrogen cooled generator, all power train components arranged on a single shared power shaft. The 7HA.02 combustion turbine is equipped with evaporative inlet cooling, selective catalytic reduction for NOx reduction, and oxidation catalysts to minimize CO and VOC emissions. The outdoor located GE triple pressure Heat Recovery Steam Generator (HRSG) powers the STF-A650 turbine. The HRSG is also equipped for supplemental natural gas firing to boost steam generation and startup time, allowing the facility to supply 300 megawatts of power to PJM's grid within 10 minutes notice.

The plant's closed-loop cooling system uses dry air cooling vs. conventional water-cooled technology, reducing facility water consumption by 90 to 95%. The air-cooled condensers were supplied by SPG Dry Cooling of Brussels, Belgium." Water for facility operation is provided by the village of Byesville with wastewater being returned for processing, the arrangement having a 20-year renewable contract.

GPS developers contracted the facility's first 5 years of operation to EthosEnergy, headquartered in Houston, Texas, responsible for recruiting and hiring all operation and maintenance staff.

Because of its near 64% combined-cycle efficiency, GPS is anticipated to operate year-round as a PJM base load supplier. Plant maximum capacity can use up to 160,000 MMBtu (1 million British thermal units) or 1,000 MCF (volume of 1,000 cubic feet) per day. GPS' 2024 annual operation generated 10.9 TWh power from 77.0 M MMBtu fuel consumption.
