= Caithness Energy =

US independent power producer

Caithness Energy, LLC
- Trade name: Caithness
- Type: Privately held company
- Industry: Energy Industry
- Founded: 1964; 62 years ago
- Headquarters: Red Bank, New Jersey
- Website: https://caithnessenergy.com/

Caithness Energy, LLC (Caithness) is a privately held independent power producer in the United States. Established in 1964, its business operations have shifted over time, currently focused on the development, acquisition, operation, and management of power generation assets. Corporate offices are currently in Red Bank, New Jersey.

Caithness claims involvement in developing and operating some of the largest geothermal, solar, and wind projects in North America.

== History ==
c. 1964, Caithness's initial strategy was natural resource exploration (e.g., gold, silver, oil and gas).

c. 1980's, focus was on exploration of domestic geothermal sources to pair with development of electric generating plants. Primary geothermal projects were the 240 MW Coso Geothermal Project in California, the 60 MW Dixie Valley and 17 MW Steamboat Springs Geothermal Projects in Nevada.

c. 1990s, Caithness stayed the power industry, expanding into renewable wind and solar power, and simple and combined-cycle natural-gas powered generating facilities.

In 2007, Caithness sold a portion of its power plant portfolio to Arclight Capital Partners, which renamed the portfolio Terra-Gen Power. Caithness has since refocused efforts on environmentally progressive fossil fuel projects and renewable power (wind, solar, and geothermal) projects.

== Operations ==
Some of its planned, current, and former facilities include:

- Guernsey Power Station
- Caithness Long Island Energy Center
- Shepherds Flat Wind Farm
- Coso Geothermal Power Project
- Geothermal system at Beowawe
