= Energy in Oregon =

Energy and electricity in Oregon

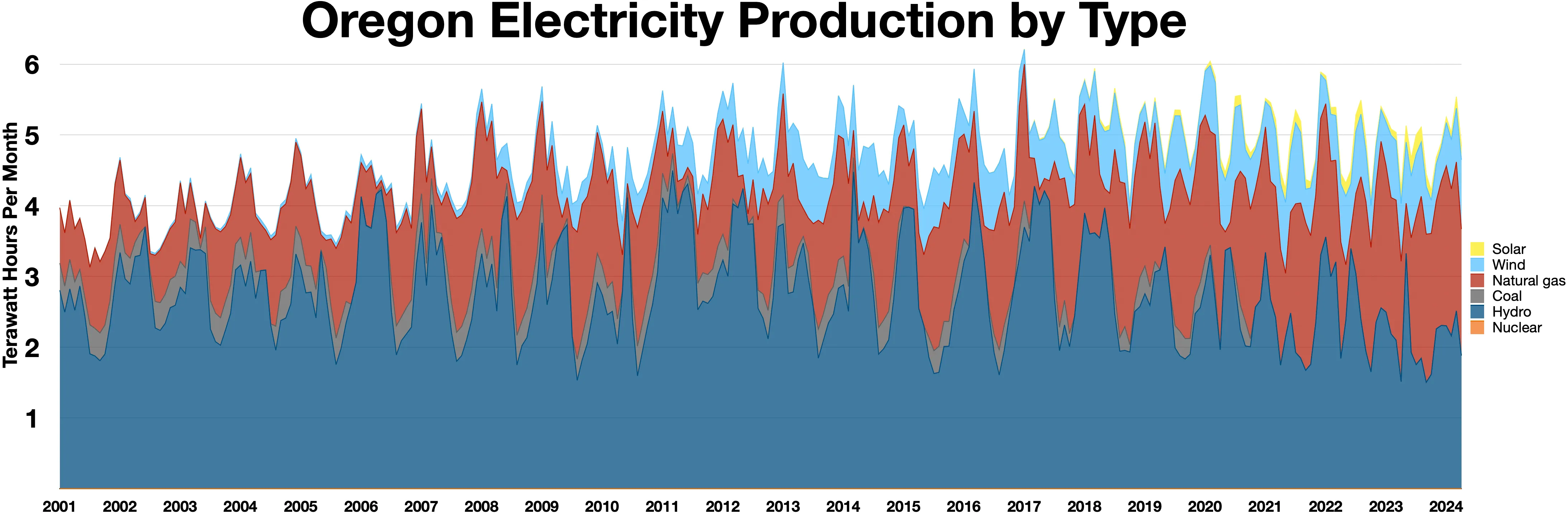
Oregon electricity production by type

The U.S. state of Oregon is the third largest renewable energy producing state in the United States. Hydroelectric power dominates the power market in Oregon, providing nearly two-thirds of the electricity generated in the state, although it accounts for only 38.91% of the total percentage consumed when electricity imported from other states is accounted for. Natural gas is the second largest source of energy consumption in Oregon, that being one third of Oregon's net power generation. This is mostly due to recent reserves of natural gas being found in Coos Bay, OR. As well as persistent extraction from the Mist Field in northwest Oregon, near Astoria. The energy used in Oregon comes mainly from hydroelectric power at 38.91%, coal at 26.47%, natural gas at 21.50%, and wind at 7.01%.

== Electricity ==
Sources of Oregon Electricity Generation

The following table uses official statistics from the Oregon Department of Energy to show Oregon's changing electric fuel mix:

Year	2001	2002	2003	2005	2006-08	2009-11	2010-12	2012-14
Hydro (%)	38	43	44	42	44	43	45	43
Coal (%)	39	42	42	41	37	34	33	34
Natural Gas (%)	15	8	7	10	12	12	12	14
Nuclear (%)	4	3	3	3	4	3	3	3
Wind/Geothermal (%)	1	1	1	1	2	5	5	6
Biomass (%)	3	3	3	3	1	3	1	0.3
Total (%)	100	100	100	100	100	100	100	100

== Renewable energy ==
The Oregon Renewable Energy Act was signed into law in 2007. It mandated that at least 20% of all energy resources comes from renewable resources by 2020, and it raises the standard to 25% by 2025.

On March 8, 2016, Gov. Kate Brown signed the Clean Energy and Coal Transition Act into law. This new law mandates increases in renewable energy resources to 27% by 2025, 35% by 2030, 45% by 2035, and 50% by 2040. Under terms of the legislation, Oregonians will no longer pay for any energy from coal by 2035.

== See also ==
- Trojan Nuclear Power Plant, Oregon's only nuclear power plant in service 1970 to 1992
- List of power stations in Oregon
- Wind power in Oregon
- Solar power in Oregon
- Energy in the United States
