= Solar power in Oregon =

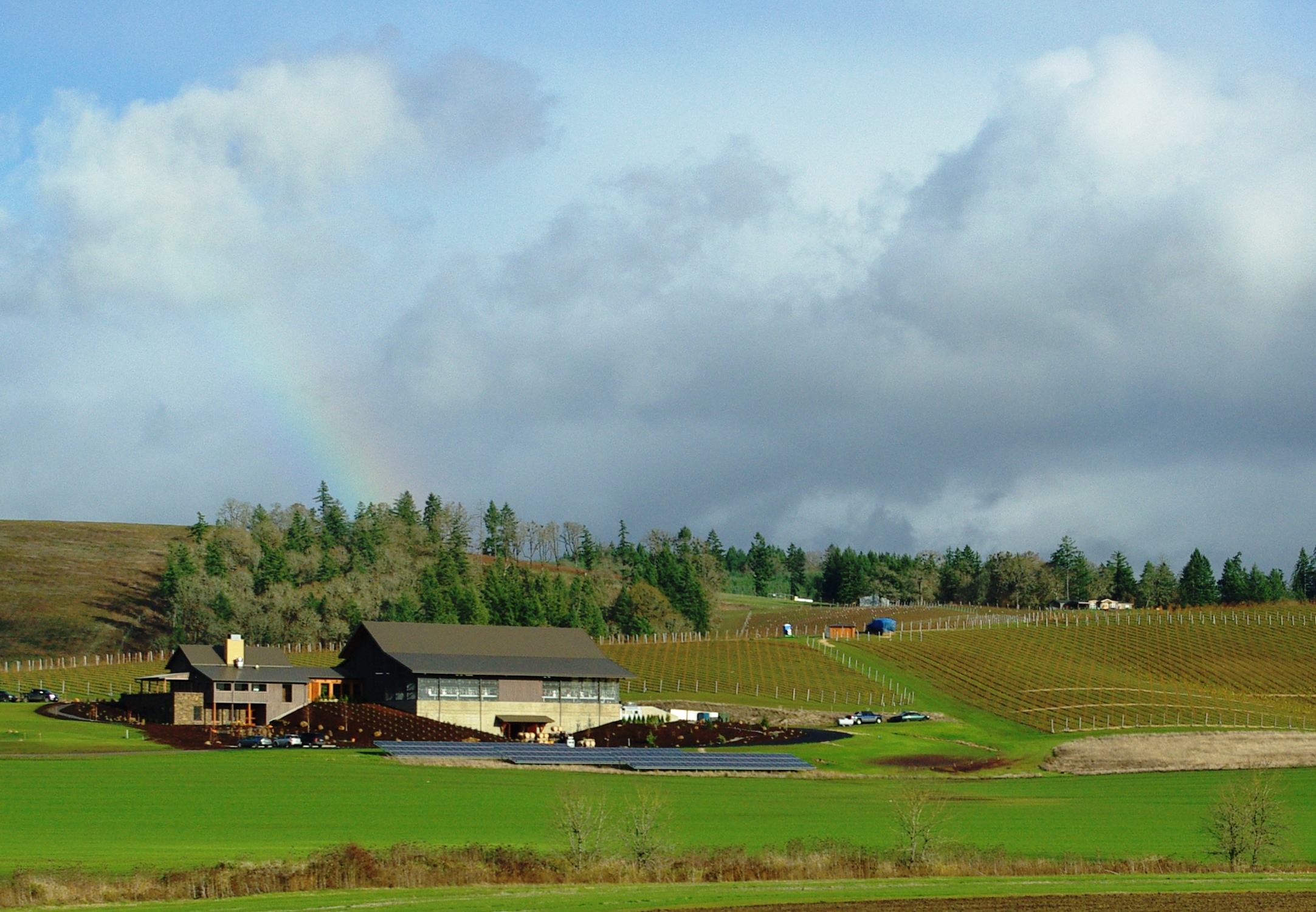
Solar panels at a winery in Yamhill County

Solar power has been growing in the U.S. state of Oregon in recent years, due to new technological improvements and a variety of regulatory actions and financial incentives enacted by the state government.

== Government policy ==
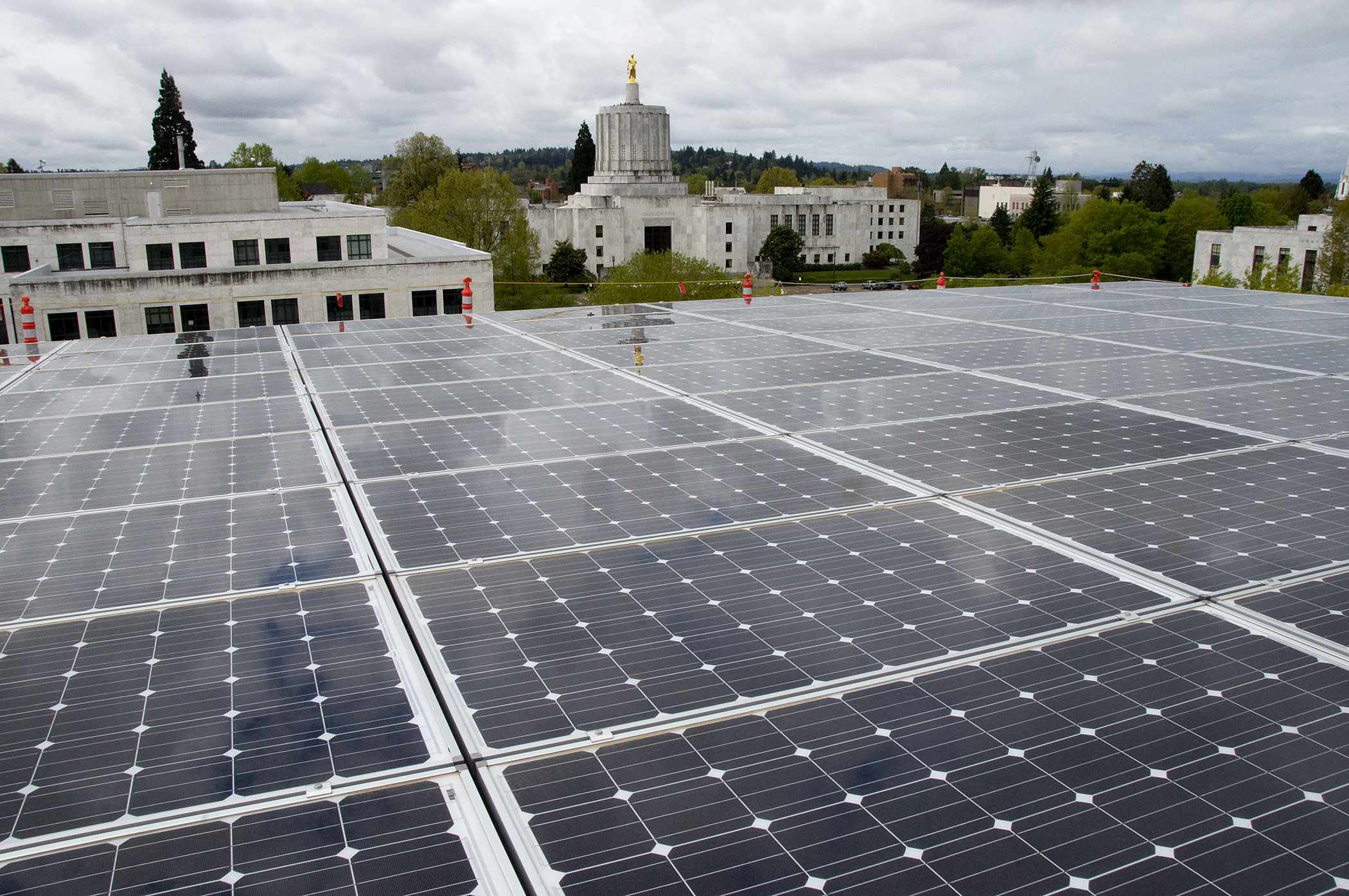
Solar panel installation, Salem

The Government of Oregon has taken a variety of actions to encourage solar energy use and manufacturing within the state. A 2017 law states that homeowner associations cannot ban solar panels.

=== Net metering ===
The state has a net metering program that allows for large installations of up to 2 MW of on-site electrical generation. A report released in 2009 by the Network for New Energy Choices and Vote Solar gave the state's net metering system an "A" grade, a rating only nine other states received.

=== Renewable portfolio standard ===
The state adopted a renewable portfolio standard (RPS) in 2007 which requires that 25% of Oregon's electricity come from renewable resources by 2025. The RPS was revised in 2009 to include a separate 20 MW solar photovoltaic requirement by 2020.

=== Construction budget mandate ===
Passed in the 2007 legislative session, House Bill 2620 requires that public entities such as state and local governments spend 1.5% of the construction budget for new or renovated buildings on on-site solar technologies.

=== Financial incentives ===
==== Solar Within Reach ====
Solar Within Reach is a program through the Energy Trust of Oregon that provides incentives for income-qualified families. Adding a solar power system to a home can greatly reduce energy bills, and this program is designed to help offset the costs of installing such a system, so homeowners can reap the benefits without a big startup cost.

==== Oregon Solar + Storage Rebate Program ====
In 2019, HB 2618 was passed, which created a new ODOE solar rebate program through the Oregon Department of Energy (ODOE). This rebate program allows residential solar energy customers as well as low-income service providers in Oregon to receive rebates for solar energy systems, whether they are stand-alone systems or paired with a solar energy storage system.

==== Residential Energy Tax Credit ====
The Residential Energy Tax Credit (RETC) program aims to encourage residents to invest in energy efficient appliances or residential-scale power producing systems such as roof-mounted solar or small wind setups by offering a tax credit that covers a certain percentage of the cost of eligible equipment.

==== Business Energy Tax Credit ====
The Business Energy Tax Credit (BETC) program aims to encourage private businesses to invest in renewable energy in Oregon by offering a tax credit that covers up to 50% of eligible renewable projects such as power stations or manufacturing factories with a maximum limit of $20 million per project.

==== State Energy Loan Program ====
The State Energy Loan Program aims to encourage investment in energy efficiency and renewable energy production by offering long-term, fixed-rate loans to all types of organizations and individuals with a maximum cap at $20 million per loan. From the time it was first authorized by voters in 1980, the program has made over 700 loans worth a total of $335 million.

==== Feed-in tariff ====
The Oregon Legislative Assembly established a feed-in tariff for solar power modeled on feed-in tariffs in Germany, allowing owners of solar installations to be paid for the electricity they produce. On May 28, 2010, the Oregon Public Utility Commission approved the trial feed-in tariff rules. Under the approved rules, residents and businesses who install solar systems can enter a 15-year contract with investor-owned utilities in the state where they will receive guaranteed monthly payments over the life of the contract with rates ranging from $0.55 to $0.65 per kWh. Funding will come from an estimated one half of 1% increase in electricity rates. The trial program ends after four years and the entire project's size is limited to a maximum 25 MW. Program applications are accepted biannually on April 1 and October 1. The final year of the pilot program was 2013.

== Manufacturing ==
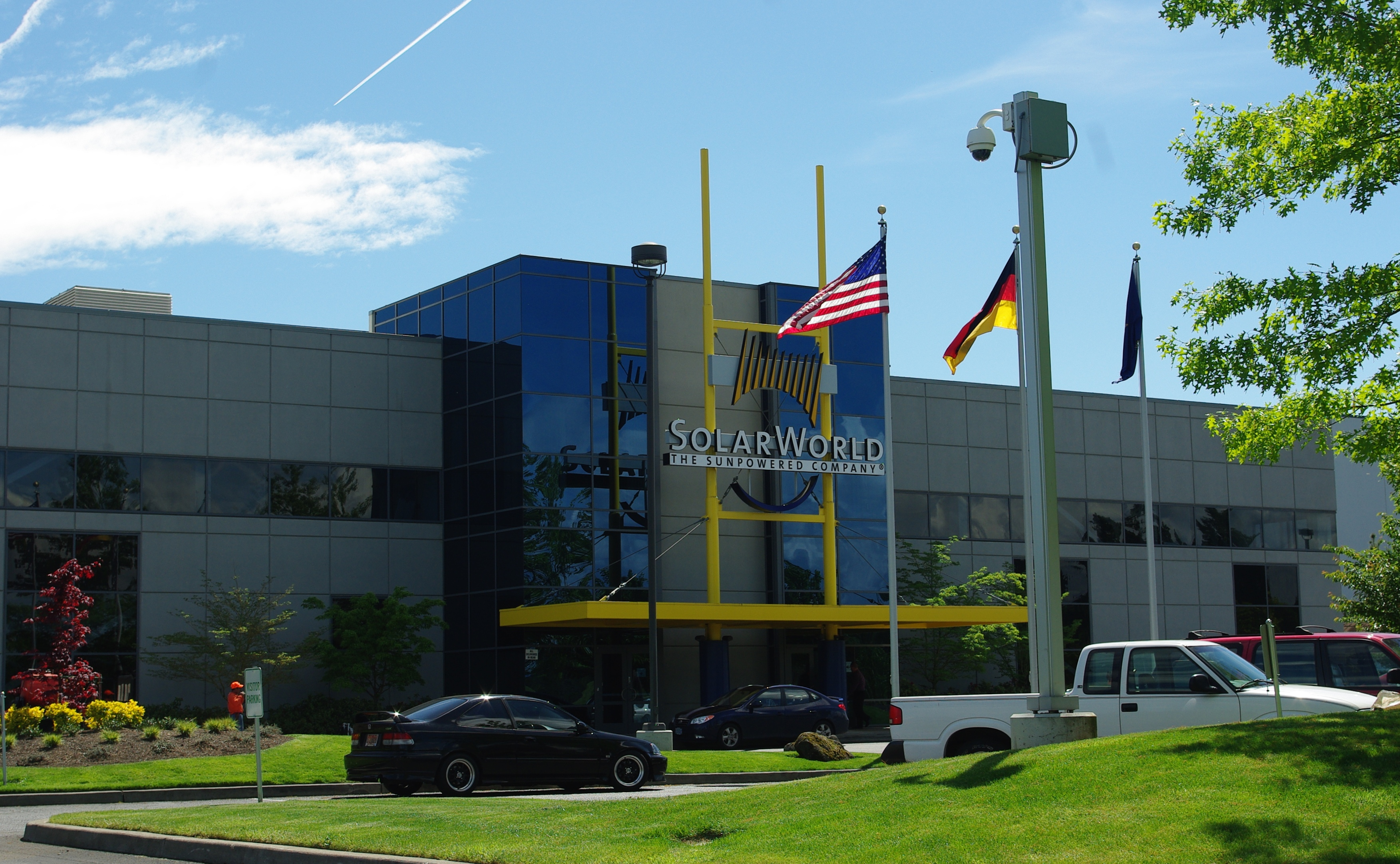
SolarWorld plant in Hillsboro

Many solar manufacturing companies have chosen to operate in Oregon because of its cheap hydroelectric power which is important for manufacturing and because of its close proximity to California's large market. The inexpensive hydroelectric power has also contributed to the high-tech manufacturing companies located in the state's Silicon Forest as well as several data centers such as Google's Project 02.

Oregon was one of the only three states (along with Michigan and Ohio) to manufacture more than 100 MW of solar panels during 2009. SolarWorld's plant in Hillsboro, Oregon is the largest solar cell manufacturing factory in North America, and planned to produce 500 MW of panels annually by 2012.

== Companies ==
Solar companies with operations in Oregon include Sunbridge Solar, Precision Solar & Heating, Energy Solutions, Avila Solar Drafting LLC, Solar Plan Sets LLC, Power Northwest, Tesla Solar, and Grape Solar.

== Notable projects ==
=== Solar panels on state capitol ===
In 2002, Oregon became the first state to install solar panels on its state capitol building. The panels on the Oregon State Capitol building are not visible from the street.

=== Solar highways ===
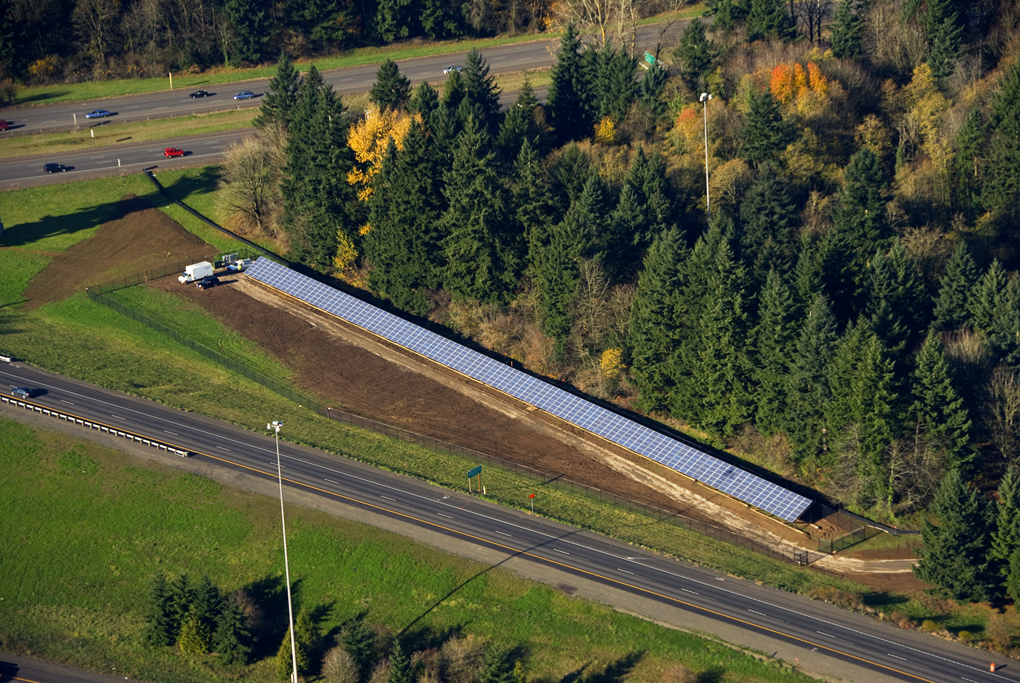
The 104kW solar highway along the interchange of Interstate 5 and I-205 near Tualatin, Oregon in December 2008

In 2008, the Oregon Department of Transportation announced the completion of a 104 kW solar panel project along the interchange of Interstate 5 and I-205 near Tualatin, Oregon. The project is the first solar highway in Oregon and the first in the United States.

In January 2012, the Oregon Department of Transportation announced the completion of its second solar highway project with a 1.75 megawatt capacity at its Baldock Safety Rest Area south of Wilsonville.

A 165 kW expansion to the first project is under study, as is a potential third solar highway project with a capacity of 3 megawatts at ODOT's maintenance storage facility in West Linn. This would be the largest solar highway in the world, slightly passing the 2.8 megawatt record holder in Germany.

=== U.S. Department of Energy partnership ===
Portland, Oregon is one of the 25 cities in the United States Department of Energy's Solar America Cities program. The program's goal is to "rapidly increase the use and integration of solar energy in communities across the country."

== Statistics ==
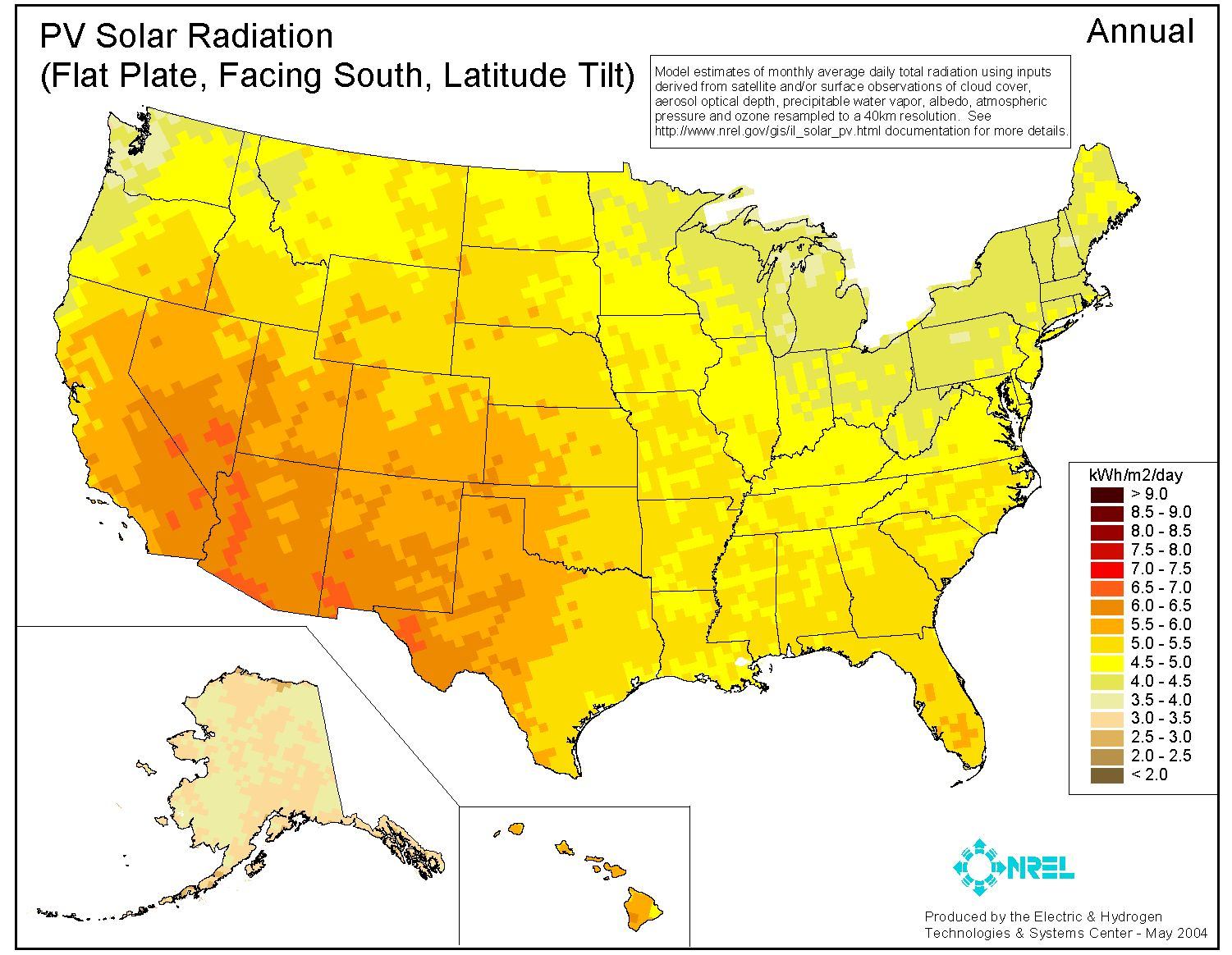
US annual average solar energy received by a latitude tilt photovoltaic cell (modeled)

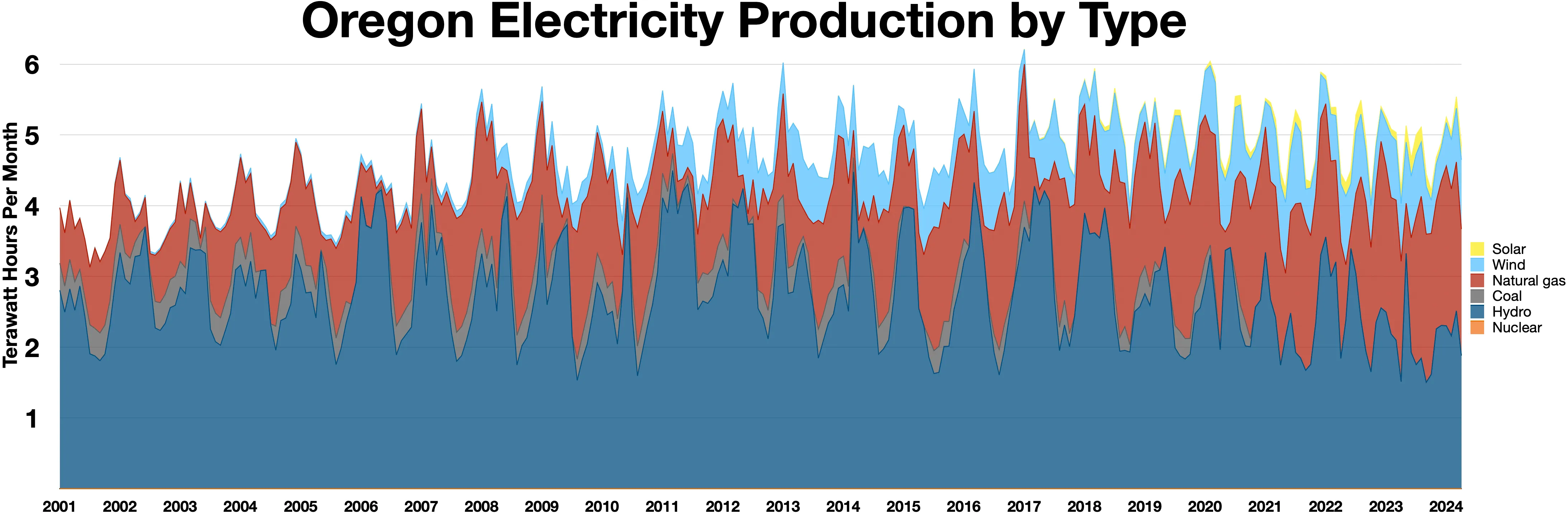
Oregon electricity production by type

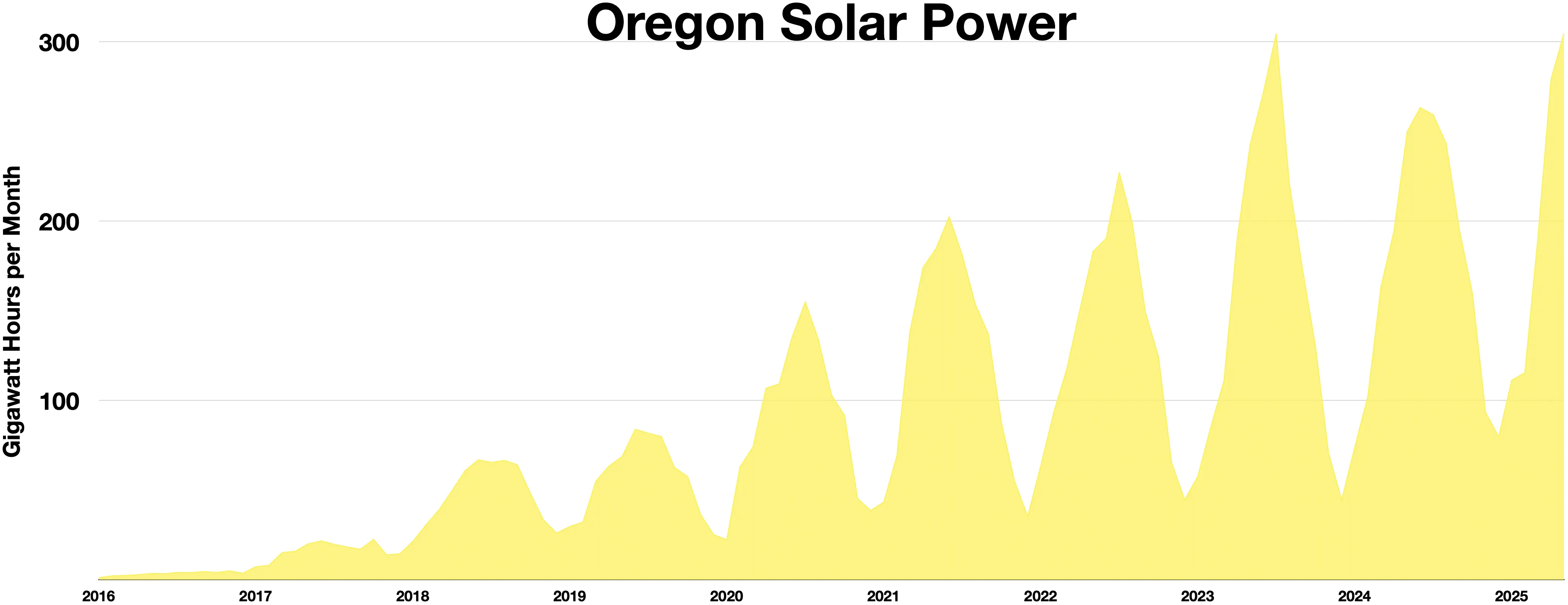
Oregon solar power

=== Potential generation ===
Solar energy is the state's most abundant energy resource, and estimates have placed the state's potential electricity production from solar power at 68,000,000 MWhs annually, an amount larger than the state's total electricity consumption of 46,457,000 MWh in 2005.

=== Installed capacity ===
Oregon grid-connected PV capacity (MW)
Year	Capacity	Change	% change
2005	1.2	0	
2006	1.7	0.5	42%
2007	2.8	1.1	65%
2008	7.7	4.9	175%
2009	14.0	6.3	82%
2010	23.9	9.9	71%
2011	35.8	11.9	50%
2012	56.4	20.6	58%
2013	62.8	6.4	11%
2014	69.2	6.4	10%
2015	90	20.8	30%
2016	215	125	138%
2017	461	246	114%
2018	591	130	28%
2019	733.4	142.4	24%
2020	966.4	233	31%
2021	1,208.2	241.8	25%
2022	1,385	176.8	%

=== Utility-scale generation ===
Utility-scale solar generation in Oregon (GWh)
Year	Total	Jan	Feb	Mar	Apr	May	Jun	Jul	Aug	Sep	Oct	Nov	Dec
2012	7	0	0	0	1	1	1	1	1	1	1	0	0
2013	19	0	1	1	1	2	2	2	2	2	2	2	2
2014	24	1	1	2	2	2	3	2	3	3	2	2	1
2015	23	1	1	2	2	2	2	3	3	2	2	2	1
2016	41	1	2	2	3	4	3	4	4	5	4	5	4
2017	194	7	8	15	16	20	22	20	18	17	23	14	14
2018	572	21	31	39	50	61	67	65	67	64	48	33	26
2019	677	30	32	55	63	69	84	82	80	63	58	36	25
2020	1,078	22	63	74	107	109	135	155	134	103	92	45	39
2021	1,258	63	79	134	163	176	176	171	154	142			

== See also ==
- Wind power in Oregon
- Energy in Oregon
- Solar power in the United States
- Renewable energy in the United States
