= GLOBIO =

Environmental conservation organization

- Formation: 2001; 22 years ago
- Founder: Gerry Ellis
- Founded at: Portland, Oregon
- Type: Nonprofit
- Purpose: Environmental Education; Conservation Awareness; Great Ape Literacy
- Headquarters: Portland, Oregon
- Methods: Delivering Visual Content; Cultivating Conservation Impact; Mobilizing Support
- Executive Director: Gerry Ellis
- Affiliations: NAAEE
- Website: https://globio.org/
- Formerly called: Global Biodiversity Education for Children Foundation

GLOBIO is a USA-based, Portland, Oregon conservation media non-profit. GLOBIO creates primate and conservation science films, videos and podcasts. The organization's mission is to support conservation organizations across Equatorial Africa and SE Asia and shares their stories globally while educating the public about our shared environmental issues through a connection to great apes.

== History ==
GLOBIO was founded by the environmental film-maker and photographer Gerry Ellis in 2001.

In 2004 the American charity began developing internet-based and hands-on educational resources to increase children's awareness and understanding about biological and cultural diversity.

Web resources developed by GLOBIO previously included the child-centric, free, online multimedia encyclopedia named GLOSSOPEDIA© (as of 2017 is no longer available online). Initial versions of the GLOSSOPEDIA© project were funded by a Toyota USA Foundation grant and private donations. Its project partners include the Wolong Nature Reserve in China, Folkmanis Puppets, and the North American Association for Environmental Education.

In 2012 the organization moved away from resource development to focus of content creation that could be served on the Internet and emerging social media digital platforms. The great ape media project was created in 2014 (originally named GreatApes2020). Now called Apes Like Us©, The project was formalized and expanded in 2017 to become a major program area of GLOBIO. Apes Like Us has created over 50 educational and awareness videos viewable on a dedicated Apes Like Us YouTube channel.

With the onset of COVID-19 in 2020, and the restriction of international air travel, and the closure of many national parks and conservation areas home to great apes, GLOBIO launched the Talking Apes podcast as an educational awareness outreach program. The podcast features conversations with scientists (Dr. Brina Pobiner), anthropologists, primatologists (Richard Wrangham, Cat Hobaiter), veterinarians, science writers and journalists (David Quammen, Carl Safina), artists and primate conservationists to increase awareness of the connection between humans and the rest of the primate world.
