= Oregon Department of Energy =

Government agency in Oregon, USA

The Oregon Department of Energy (ODOE) was established in 1975 by the Oregon Legislative Assembly as the culmination of recommendations of several task forces and study groups over several years. The state agency helps Oregonians make informed decisions and maintain a resilient and affordable energy system. ODOE advances solutions to shape an equitable clean energy transition, protect the environment and public health, and responsibly balance energy needs and impacts for current and future generations. ODOE's vision is: "A safe, equitable, clean, and sustainable future." ."

== Energy in Oregon ==
The largest source of renewable energy in Oregon is hydropower. The majority of Oregon's energy consumption comes from the transportation sector, followed by industrial use, residential use, and commercial use.

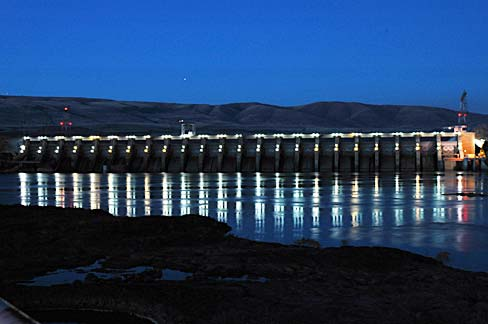
The Dalles Dam in Wasco County, Oregon - one of the hydropower producers in Oregon.

== Renewable Energy Programs ==
In accordance with the Renewable Portfolio Standard (RPS), renewable energy sources in Oregon are growing. The RPS was created in 2007, but was updated in 2016 to require that 50% of energy consumption in Oregon must come from renewable energy by 2040. ODOE is responsible for tracking the progress towards this goal in addition to helping institute ways to reach it through various programs. Suppliers that provide renewable energy sources contributing to RPS are awarded renewable energy certificates (REC). A REC is received by a supplier for one MegaWatt hour worth of renewable energy. The complete rules for establishing eligibility for a REC are listed in The Oregon Administrative Rules. These companies must submit annual compliance forms in order to continue to receive RECs.

Between 2012 and 2019, ODOE awarded over $9 million for 92 renewable energy projects statewide, including solar, hydropower, biogas, biomass, and geothermal installations. The RED Grant program promoted investment in and development of renewable energy projects by providing a grant up to $250,000 for businesses, organizations, public bodies, schools, nonprofits, and tribes that install and operate a renewable energy system that produces electric energy.
