= Wind power in Oregon =

Electricity from wind in one U.S. state

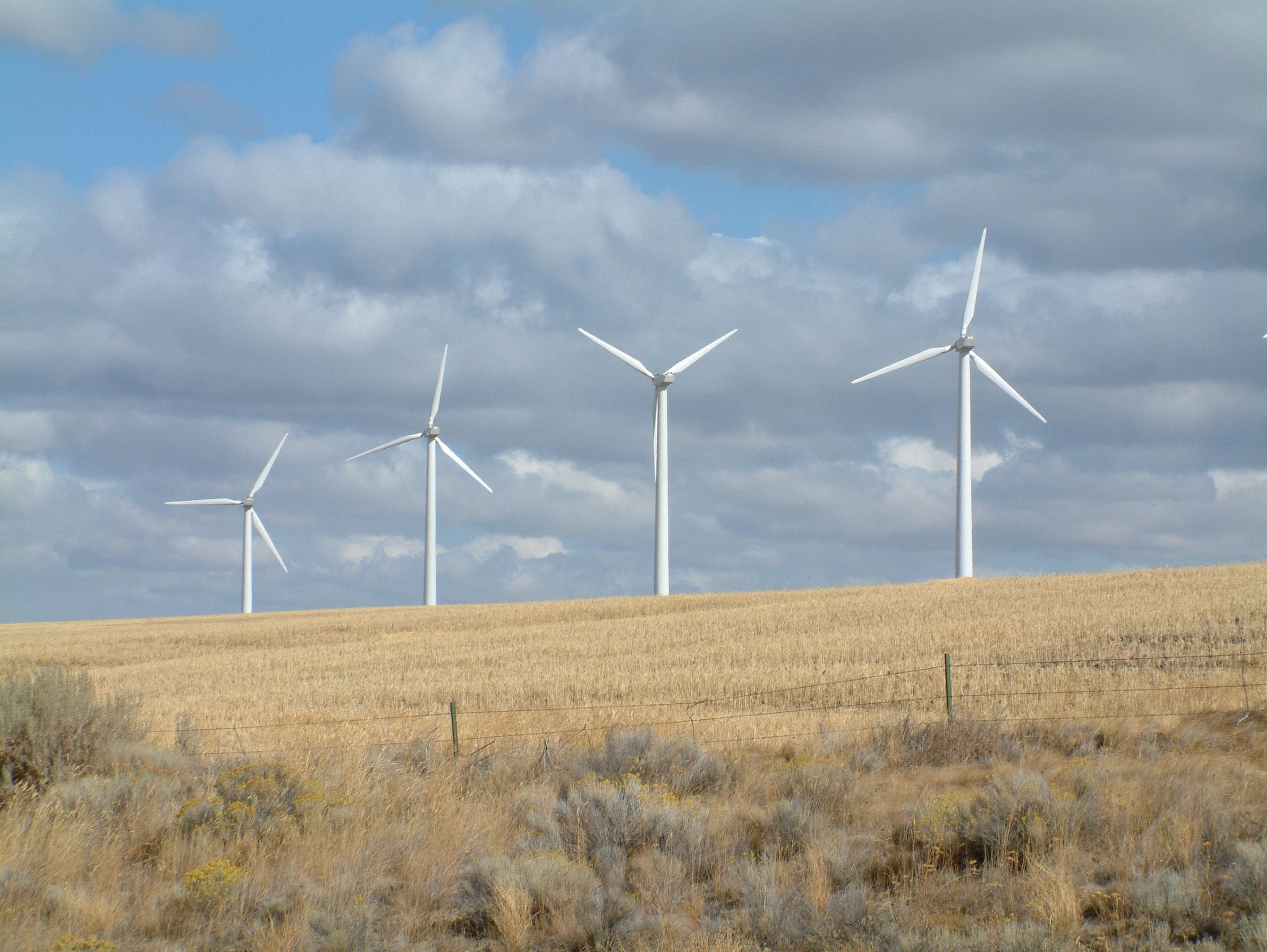
Wind turbines in eastern Oregon

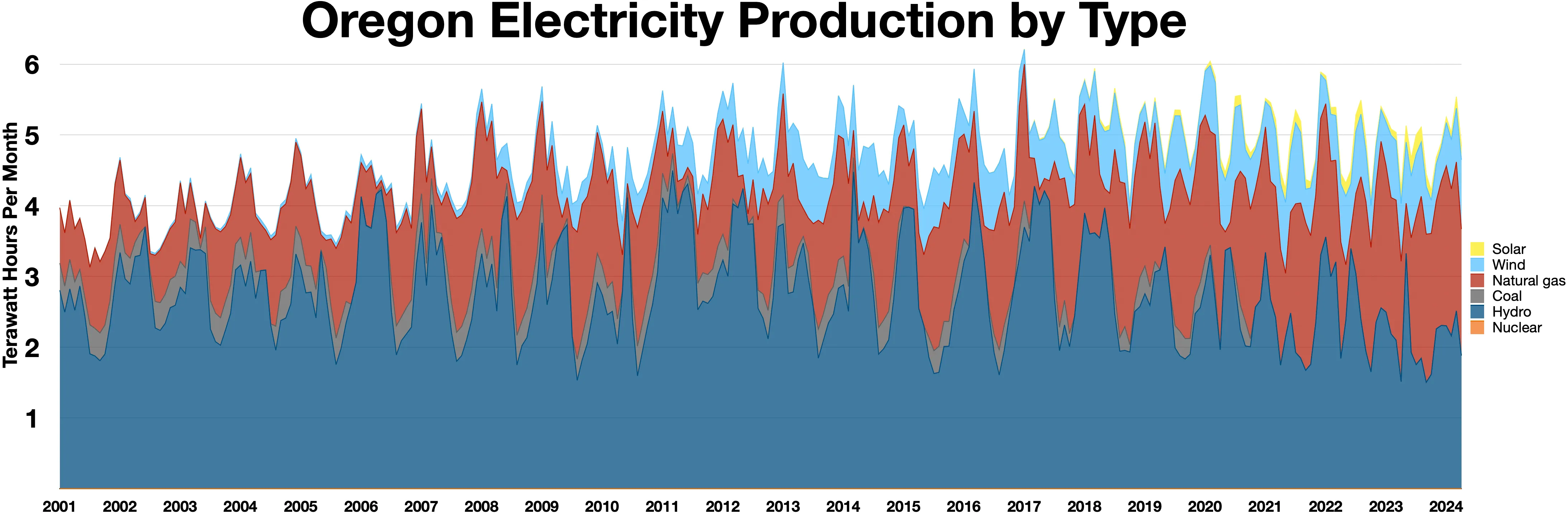
Oregon electricity production by type

The U.S. state of Oregon has large wind energy resources. Many projects have been completed, most of them in rural Eastern Oregon and near the Columbia River Gorge. Wind power accounted for 13.3% of the electricity generated in Oregon in 2024.

== Legislative actions ==
Laws passed by the Oregon Legislative Assembly in 1999 and 2007 have aimed to encourage both small and large wind projects. Oregon passed a net metering law in 1999 that helped encourage installation of small wind power systems. As of 2008, a handful of Oregonians have installed small-scale wind-power systems to reduce their carbon footprint.

Under Senate Bill 838, wind, solar, geothermal and other types of renewable power must account for 25 percent of an electric utility's retail sales by 2025. Intermediate requirements set the standard at 5 percent by 2011, climbing gradually until 2025.

In 2016, Oregon's RPS requirement target was raised to 50%, as two companies must supply 50% of Oregon's power as renewable by 2040. The US Energy Information Administration expects this to increase windpower in Oregon, as older hydropower is exported to California and not eligible for the RPS.

== Companies ==
Vestas, the largest wind turbine manufacturer in the world as of 2009, has its North American headquarters in Portland. Iberdrola Renovables, one of the larger wind farm operators, also bases their American offices in Portland.

== Capacity ==
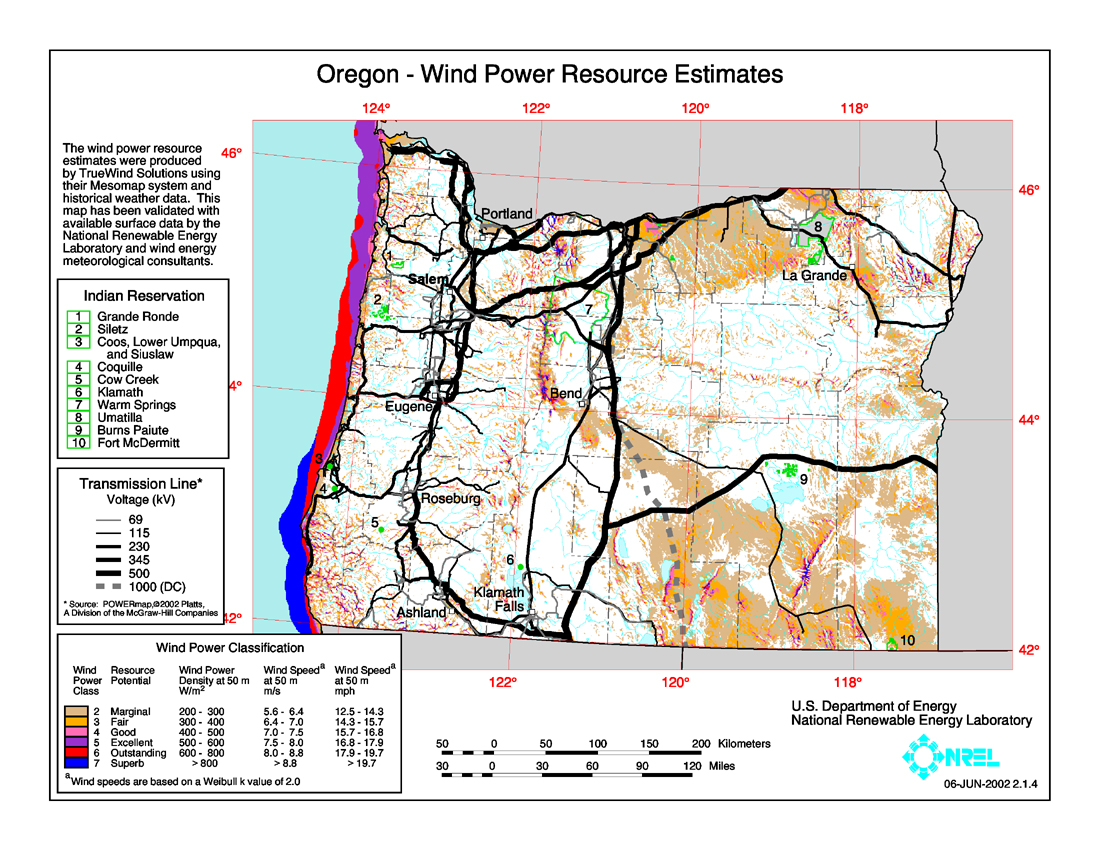
2002 image from the National Renewable Energy Laboratory showing Oregon's estimated wind power resources

=== Potential ===
Estimates from the National Renewable Energy Laboratory showed that Oregon has potential to install over 27,000 megawatts of onshore wind power. The offshore wind potential is estimated at 225,000 MW, and would be capable of generating 962,723 million kWh.

=== Installed growth ===
Installed wind power capacity in Oregon saw large growth from 2007 to 2012. Oregon ranks among the top ten states with the most wind power installed. Climbing from 1 percent in the early 2000s (decade), wind power accounted for 12.4 percent of total electricity generated in Oregon during 2013.

In 2009, 691 MW of wind-powered capacity was added in Oregon, the fourth biggest increase in the U.S. that year.

== Notable projects ==
Oregon wind generation
Gigawatthours (million kWh)

Large wind farms in Oregon
Station	Location	Capacity (MW)	Notes
Shepherds Flat Wind Farm	Gilliam and Morrow counties	845	
Biglow Canyon Wind Farm	Sherman County	450	
Klondike Wind Farm	Sherman County	399	
Golden Hills Wind Project	Sherman County	200	
Vansycle Wind Project	Umatilla County	124	
Stateline Wind Project	Umatilla County	123	

In 2009 GE Wind Energy was awarded a $1.48 billion contract to build the Shepherds Flat Wind Farm. The 845-megawatt project uses over 300 turbines and spans across 30 square miles (78 km^{2}) of Gilliam and Morrow counties in north-central Oregon. When it was completed in September 2012, it became the largest wind farm in Oregon, and the second largest in the world, although many larger ones are planned. It was completed in 2012 to take advantage of the 2.2 cent/kWh Production Tax Credit.

== Conflicts ==
About four gigawatts of new wind energy development in Eastern Oregon and Washington has not been built due to the interference it could cause with aviation radar. The radar in Fossil was upgraded in June 2015 to stop "radar clutter" caused by nearby wind farms.

== Generation ==
Wind generation capacity by year
Megawatts of wind generating capacity

Oregon wind generation (GWh, million kWh)
Year	Total	Jan	Feb	Mar	Apr	May	Jun	Jul	Aug	Sep	Oct	Nov	Dec
2001	88	3	3	8	6	6	6	7	5	5	7	7	25
2002	374	37	21	44	33	30	31	34	26	25	23	30	40
2003	445	28	36	67	27	43	28	26	22	36	45	54	33
2004	620	50	32	79	44	63	52	52	58	54	61	23	52
2005	734	40	33	72	55	55	69	58	62	63	69	88	70
2006	932	112	69	70	66	71	70	70	73	72	86	114	59
2007	1,248	73	75	100	97	109	121	101	105	98	79	84	206
2008	2,576	183	159	239	261	269	383	264	235	136	153	121	173
2009	3,470	211	90	339	364	336	448	321	443	314	273	233	98
2010	3,921	145	77	320	499	477	511	465	460	274	251	240	202
2011	4,775	289	305	296	516	464	570	475	571	263	378	427	221
2012	6,344	398	465	589	499	654	709	741	660	419	397	249	564
2013	7,455	438	636	563	959	698	682	852	615	649	343	459	561
2014	7,556	448	533	638	711	787	1,030	735	650	542	394	635	453
2015	6,630	220	423	402	635	651	663	830	748	529	437	525	567
2016	7,159	310	375	597	777	863	793	830	644	616	425	439	490
2017	6,225	207	327	521	694	566	754	874	597	478	566	386	255
2018	7,448	330	768	625	733	803	898	799	834	512	315	443	388
2019	6,567	252	310	301	687	706	961	913	753	650	491	317	226
2020	8,777	626	928	743	826	730	842	1,039	939	404	704	556	440
2021	9,592	552	969	934	938	926	781	888	822	583	729	667	803
2022	9,214	638	824	822	914	948	685	765	730	696	709	785	698
2023	2,547	687	948	912									

2016 electricity generation in Oregon by source

== See also ==
- Solar power in Oregon
- Energy in Oregon
- Wind power in the United States
- Renewable energy in the United States
