= Oregon State Leather Contest =

The Oregon State Leather Contest (Formerly known as "Blackout Leather Productions") is the largest leather title contest in Oregon. Starting in 1997 the contest has celebrated members of the BDSM and Leather community and beginning in 2015 the Pup community. In 2019 a Mx title was added and the Puppy title was changed to Oregon State Pet. The 501c3 "Oregon State Leather Contest (Formerly:Blackout Leather Productions) has run the event which draws contestants from all over Oregon and SW Washington. Judges for the contest include local community leaders, former title holders, and international title holders. In 2021 the organization's board of directors voted to change the name of the organization from Blackout Leather Productions to Oregon State Leather Contest.

Several winners of Oregon titles have gone on to win international titles such as the International Mister Bootblack title and American Leatherwoman. Title holders have gone on to compete at International Ms. Leather and Bootblack, International Mr. Leather and Bootblack, and International Puppy and Handler.

== Oregon State Leather Contest Board of Directors ==
The Oregon State Leather Contest is a nonprofit 501c3 organization that is overseen by a Board of Directors that produces the contests, and organizes fundraising and charitable giving.

The Board of Directors currently:

- Stormy Styles, President (Former Ms. OSL 2013) (serving since 2022)
- Bobby Martin, Secretary (serving since 2022)
- Nick Lette, Treasurer. (Former Mr.OSL 2018) (serving since 2020)
- Jacob Cannon- Member at large (serving since 2023)

== Title Holders ==
=== Mr.Oregon State Leather ===
- 2024 Heartburn
- 2022-2023- Vacant
- 2019-2021- Ivarr Brockson
- 2018 - Papa Bear Nick Lette
- 2017 - Connor Braddock
- 2016 - Lucky Rebel (Went on to win IMBB 2018)
- 2015 - Cole Miner
- 2014 - Mister Sir Steven
- 2013 - Bill Westervelt
- 2012 - Danny Cage
- 2011 - Tarsus
- 2010 - Peter Pinn Palermo
- 2009 - Brent Seeley
- 2008 - Dominic
- 2007 - Ben Brown Jr.
- 2006 - Tom Ayers
- 2005 - Jeff Landis
- 2004 - Andy Mangels
- 2003 - Earl Coffman
- 2002 - Mack McCall
- 2001 - Rob Hathaway
- 2000 - Charlie Salt
- 1999 - Craig W.
- 1998 - Don Hood
- 1997 - Thom Butts

=== Ms.Oregon State Leather ===
- 2019-2021- MizTee
- 2018 - Leland Carina
- 2017 - Jena Jackson
- 2016 - Vacant
- 2015 - Petal
- 2014 - Shawna Clausen
- 2013 - Ms. Stormy
- 2012 - Michelle Harris
- 2011 - Mz. Tracey
- 2010 - Shell Bishop
- 2009 - Vacant
- 2008 - Val Vittitow
- 2007 - Coral Mallow
- 2006 - Tommie
- 2005 - Lynnda Hale
- 2004 - Theresa
- 2003 - Alycyn Britton
- 2002 - Daemon
- 2001 - Tobin Britton
- 2000 - Cyd Athens
- 1999 - Vacant
- 1998 - Vacant
- 1997 - Lynne Pierce

=== Oregon State Bootblack ===
- 2023- Colin Ashante
- 2019-2022-Vacant
- 2018- Sean Rebel
- 2017 - Jax Black
- 2016 - Eric Windham
- 2015 - Micky Rebel
- 2014 - Vacant
- 2013 - Dara (IMsBB 2014)
- 2012 - Sammy (IMBB 2013)
- 2011 - Nick Elliott (an original member of PDX Bootblacks and IMBB 2012))

Three Oregon State Bootblacks have gone on to win International Bootblack Titles, with one placing as the 1st Runner Up.

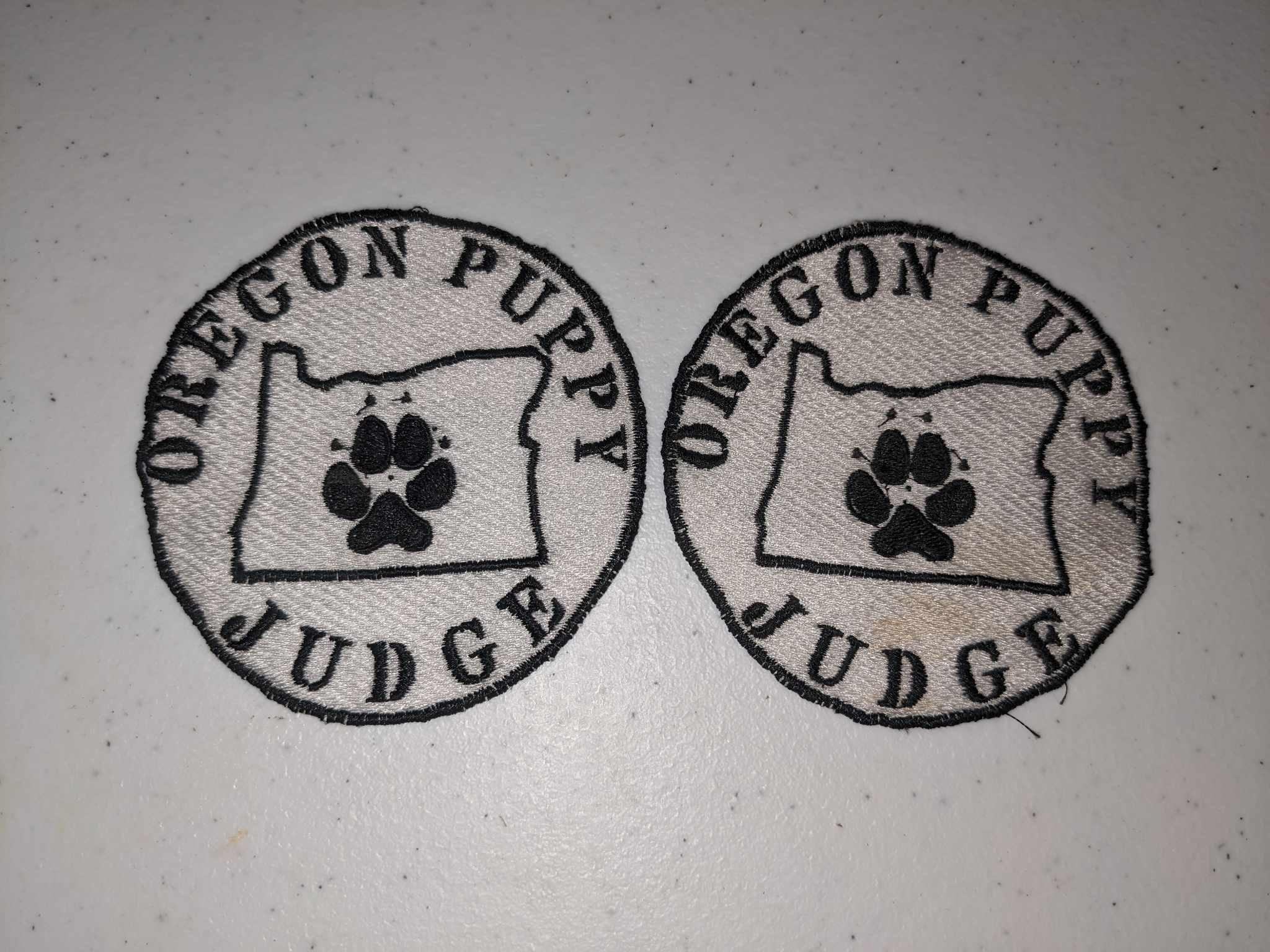
Judges patches, given to the judges of the first Oregon State Puppy Contest. Artwork by PupAngel, physical patches made by Pounder.

=== Oregon State Pup/Pet ===
- 2023- Tucker Max
- 2022- Vacant
- 2019-2021- Pup Timber
- 2018- (requested to be removed)
- 2017 - Cedar Pup
- 2016 - vacant
- 2015 - Pup Zombie
- Pup Blaze held the Pup title in a contest that was subsequently donated to the Oregon State Contest by its founders Billy Senjo and Jacob Cannon
- The title was changed from OS Pup to OS Pet in 2019, starting with Pup Timber.

=== Mx.Oregon State Leather ===
- 2019-2021 - Joe LeBlanc
