= National Register of Historic Places listings in Sherman County, Oregon =

Location of Sherman County in Oregon

This list presents the full set of buildings, structures, objects, sites, or districts designated on the National Register of Historic Places in Sherman County, Oregon, United States, and offers brief descriptive information about each of them. The National Register recognizes places of national, state, or local historic significance across the United States. Out of over 90,000 National Register sites nationwide, Oregon is home to over 2,000, and 5 of those are found in Sherman County.

This National Park Service list is complete through NPS recent listings posted March 14, 2025.

== Current listings ==
	Name on the Register	Image	Date listed	Location	City or town	Description
1	Columbia Southern Railway Passenger Station and Freight Warehouse	Columbia Southern Railway Passenger Station and Freight Warehouse	February 19, 1991 (#91000059)	SW Clark and Fulton Streets; 45°35′27″N 120°41′53″W	Wasco	
2	DeMoss Springs Park	DeMoss Springs Park	April 12, 2007 (#07000366)	De Moss Springs, off Highway 97 approximately 3 miles (4.8 km) north of Moro; 45°30′44″N 120°40′58″W	Moro vicinity	
3	Mack Canyon Archeological Site	Mack Canyon Archeological Site	August 22, 1975 (#75001600)	Address restricted	Grass Valley vicinity	This extensive series of pit houses was occupied seasonally in winter by Columbia River tribes for about 7,000 years from after 5000 BCE to the early 19th century CE.
4	John and Helen Moore House	John and Helen Moore House	August 5, 1994 (#94000806)	66432 Highway 97; 45°26′44″N 120°45′16″W	Moro vicinity	This house is an excellent example of the rural expression of the Italianate style. Built in 1882, around the time of Sherman County's first large-scale settlement, it is one of the oldest houses in the county, and the only Italianate house in the region.
5	Sherman County Courthouse	Sherman County Courthouse	August 28, 1998 (#98001122)	500 Court Street; 45°29′14″N 120°43′53″W	Moro	

== See also ==
- National Register of Historic Places listings in Oregon
- Listings in neighboring counties: Gilliam, Klickitat, Wasco
- Historic preservation
- History of Oregon
- Lists of Oregon-related topics
