= Columbia Southern Railway =

Railway line in Oregon, United States

The Columbia Southern Railway built a rail line extending 69.46 miles (111.79 km) from Biggs (on the Columbia River) south to Shaniko, Oregon, U.S. The company was incorporated on March 5, 1897, and intended to continue beyond Shaniko to Prineville, with a branch to Canyon City. Operations began October 6, 1897, on 8.5 miles (13.7 km) from Biggs to Wasco, and the line was extended to Moro on January 13, 1899, Grass Valley on March 27, 1900, and Shaniko on May 13, 1900. The Union Pacific Railroad (UP), owner of the Oregon Railroad and Navigation Company (OR&N), which followed the Columbia River through Biggs, gained control of the Columbia Southern in 1905, and leased it to the OR&N on June 30, 1906. The properties of the OR&N and Columbia Southern Railway were conveyed to new UP subsidiary Oregon–Washington Railroad and Navigation Company on December 23, 1910.

A railway timetable for September 9, 1900, listed station stops for Biggs, Gibsons, Wasco, Klondyke, Summit, Hay Canyon Junction, McDonalds, DeMoss, Moro, Erskineville, Grass Valley, Bourbon, Kent, Wilcox, and Shaniko. The morning (northbound) train was to leave Shaniko at 8 a.m. and to arrive in Biggs at 11:25 a.m. The southbound train was scheduled to leave Biggs at 1:34 p.m. and to arrive in Shaniko at 5:20 p.m.

No extension was ever built beyond Shaniko, but UP subsidiary Des Chutes Railroad built a line to the west along the Deschutes River, reaching Bend in 1911; Prineville built its own railroad, the City of Prineville Railway, to a connection with this line in 1917 and 1918. The Interstate Commerce Commission authorized abandonment of the old Columbia Southern Railway from Shaniko to Kent in 1943, and of the remainder between Kent and Biggs in 1967.

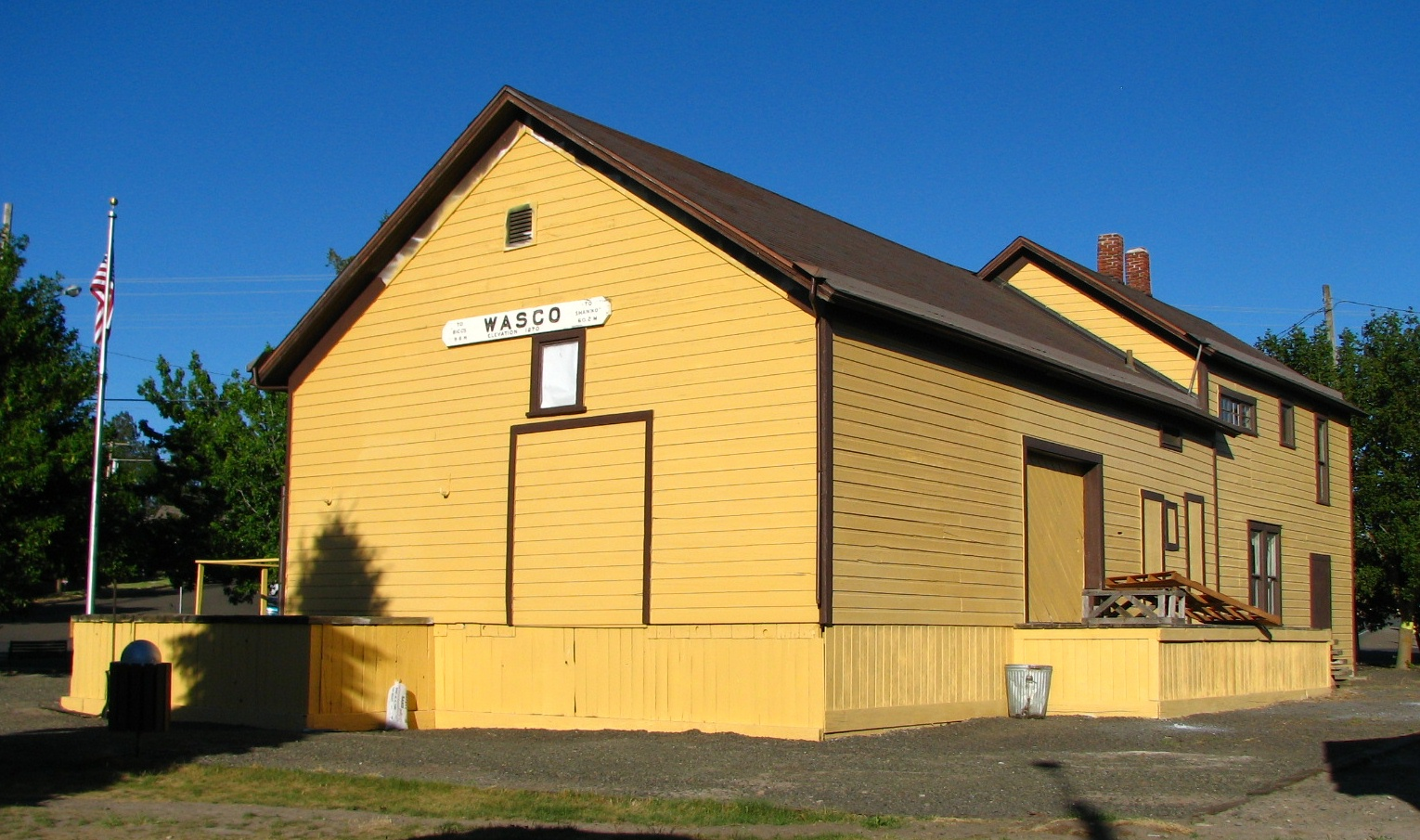
Passenger station and freight warehouse in Wasco

The 1898 Columbia Southern Railway Passenger Station and Freight Warehouse in Wasco and the 1902 Columbia Southern Hotel in Shaniko have been listed on the National Register of Historic Places.

== See also ==
- List of defunct Oregon railroads
