= Klondike, Oregon =

Unincorporated community in the state of Oregon, United States

- Unincorporated community
- Location within Oregon Location within the United States
- Coordinates: 45.583°N 120.614°W
- Country: United States
- State: Oregon
- County: Sherman
- Elevation: 1,558 ft (475 m)
- Time zone: UTC-8 (Pacific (PST))
  - Summer (DST): UTC-7 (PDT)
- ZIP code: 97065
- Area codes: 458 and 541

Klondike is an unincorporated community in Sherman County, Oregon, United States. It is near the Wasco, Oregon site of the Klondike III Wind Project, Oregon's largest wind energy farm with 176 turbines for wind energy.

== History ==
When the Columbia Southern Railway was being built in 1898, the line got to this location when word of a gold discovery in the north was received. Most of the construction crew deserted and headed north to the Klondike. So they decided to name the place after that river.

A.B. Potter was first postmaster of its post office, which was established on January 11, 1899. The office closed on November 30, 1951.
