= Erskine, Oregon =

Unincorporated community in the state of Oregon, United States

- Unincorporated community
- Location within Oregon Location within the United States
- Coordinates: 45°26′17″N 120°46′43″W
- Country: United States
- State: Oregon
- County: Sherman
- Elevation: 2,162 ft (659 m)
- Time zone: UTC-8 (Pacific (PST))
  - Summer (DST): UTC-7 (PDT)
- Area codes: 458 and 541
- GNIS feature ID: 1167703

Erskine is an unincorporated community in Sherman County, in the U.S. state of Oregon. It lies between Moro and Grass Valley along Erskine Road, west of U.S. Route 97.

Erskine at various times was known by other names: Erskineville, Erskine Springs, and Millra. An Erskineville post office was established here in 1882; Abiel Erskine was the first postmaster. The Columbia Southern Railway called the place Erskineville in 1900 when it built its line through this community, but the Union Pacific later shortened that to Erskine. The Erskineville post office closed in 1907. Erskine is the name that appears on maps in the 21st century.
