= Cottonwood Canyon State Park =

State park in Oregon, United States

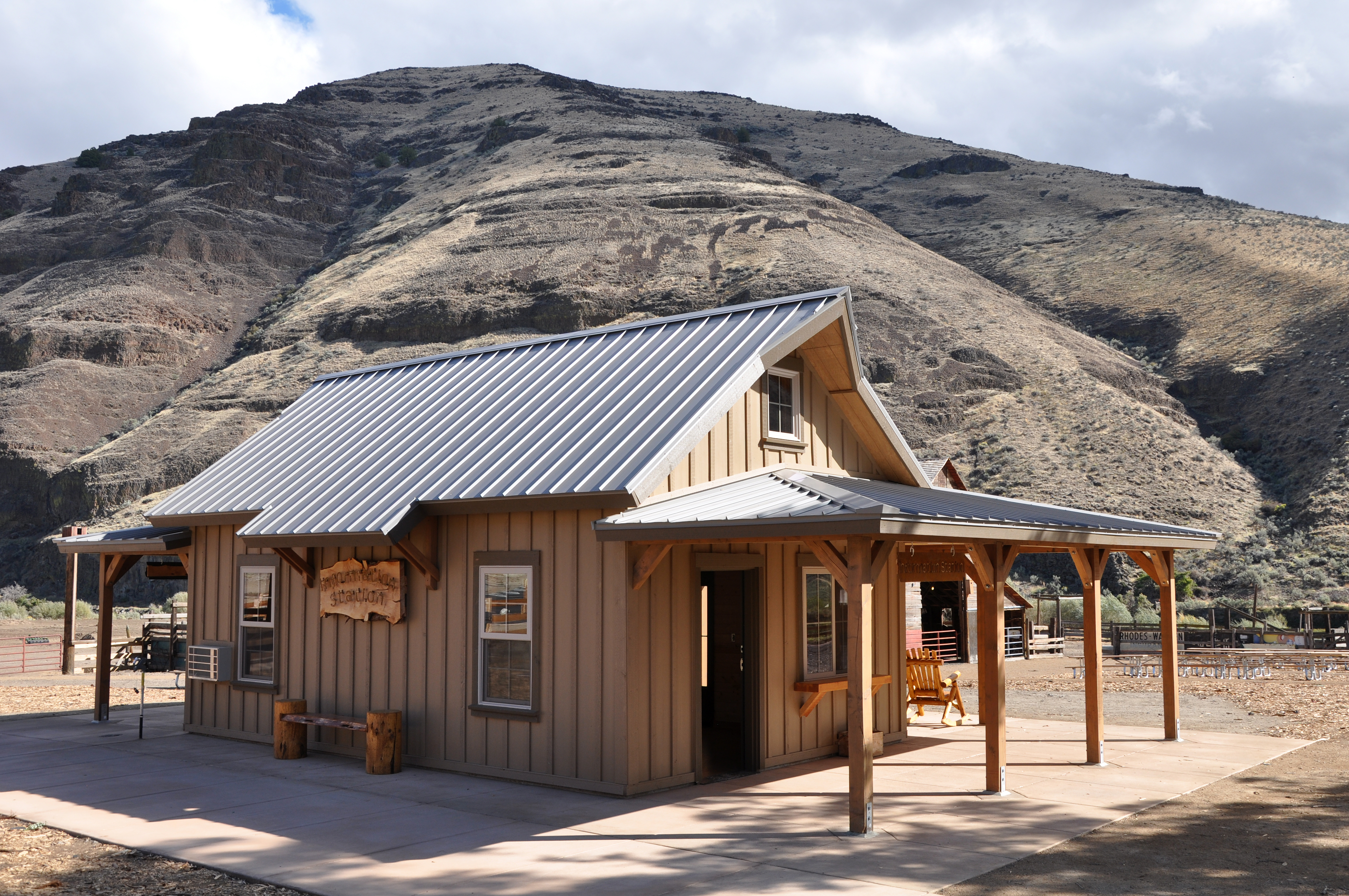
- Information station in the park

- Location within Oregon Location within the United States
- Type: Public, state
- Location: Sherman and Gilliam counties, Oregon
- Nearest city: Wasco
- Coordinates: 45°28′42″N 120°28′20″W
- Area: 8,000 acres (3,200 ha)
- Created: 2013
- Operator: Oregon Parks and Recreation Department
- Open: All year
- Website: Cottonwood Canyon State Park

Cottonwood Canyon State Park is a state park in the U.S. state of Oregon. Established in 2013, it is the second-largest state park in Oregon, encompassing 8,000 acres (3,200 ha) on the lower John Day River. The park land is surrounded by an additional 10,000 acres of public land managed by the Bureau of Land Management (BLM), which is maintained in cooperation with the state to provide a contiguous recreation footprint of over 18,000 acres.

The only Oregon State Park larger in size is Silver Falls State Park, which encompasses 9,064 acres (3,668 ha). In 2024, Cottonwood Canyon was officially certified as an International Dark Sky Park, recognizing its exceptional lack of light pollution and commitment to sky preservation.

== History ==
In 2008, Western Rivers Conservancy bought the land from a cattle-ranching family, the Murthas, who had owned it since the 1930s. The conservancy was able to borrow money from the Wyss Foundation to make a quick purchase possible. Later, Western Rivers offered to sell the land to the Oregon Parks and Recreation Department (OPRD) to create a state park. OPRD agreed and paid Western Rivers what the non-profit had paid the Murthas, $7.86 million. In 2022, the park applied to become the 2nd IDA Dark Sky Park in the state of Oregon, with approvals expected to come by mid to late 2023. In late 2024, it has been certified as a Dark Sky Park.

== Geography ==
Park headquarters, about a two-hour drive east of Portland, is adjacent to Oregon Route 206 between Wasco and Condon. The river, which forms the boundary between Sherman County on the west and Gilliam County on the east, meanders for 16 miles (26 km) through the arid canyon landscape.

The walls of the main canyon reach up to 1,920 feet (590 m) above sea level within the park boundaries. The terrain features four prominent side canyons: Hay Creek, Esau, Rattlesnake, and Cottonwood. These canyons are characterized by sweeping grasslands, sagebrush shrub-steppe, river bottoms, and rugged sheer cliffs composed of the Columbia River Basalt Group.

== Fauna and flora ==
In 2010, a small number of California bighorn sheep were transplanted to the park's future location from the nearby Lower Deschutes Wildlife Area; the herd eventually grew into one of Oregon's largest. Rocky Mountain elk, mule deer, pronghorn, coyotes, and many smaller mammals can be found in the area. A variety of snakes (including the western rattlesnake) live in the park, which is also home to several lizard species. Frogs, toads, and waterfowl can be found near the river. Fish in the river include Chinook salmon, steelhead, catfish, carp and smallmouth bass.

Raptors such as American kestrels and Swainson's hawks frequent the area. Game birds such as the chukar partridge and the ring-necked pheasant are found in the uplands, and migratory birds such as Bullock's oriole and the lazuli bunting visit the park in summer.

Balsamroot and monkey flower bloom here in early May. Sagebrush blooms in October. OPRD workers have been planting small numbers of box elder, chokecherry and hawthorn trees to provide shade near park headquarters.

== Facilities and recreation ==
The park features developed infrastructure clustered near the historic ranching headquarters, largely expanded in 2019 through a $2 million state lottery-funded development project. Facilities include the Experience Center—a 1,500-square-foot multi-use indoor classroom and event pavilion used for environmental education—alongside a shaded outdoor picnic shelter, flush restrooms, and hot showers.

Accommodations at the Lone Tree Campground include:

- 21 primitive campsites accommodating tents or self-contained RVs up to 75 feet (23 m).
- 14 walk-in tent sites featuring solar charging stations and wind-shield structures.
- 4 reservable rustic cabins (two of which are pet-friendly).
- 7 dedicated hiker/biker campsites and a group tent camp for up to 25 people.

Recreational activities include hiking, trail running, mountain biking, stargazing, and river rafting. The John Day River is a notable destination for anglers targeting summer steelhead, smallmouth bass, catfish, and carp.

=== Trails ===
Three primary maintained trails run parallel to the John Day River corridor:

- Pinnacles Trail: A 4.3 miles (6.9 km) flat trail running downstream along the west side of the river in Sherman County.
- Lost Corral Trail: A 4.3 miles (6.9 km) trail running downstream along the east side of the river in Gilliam County.
- Hard Stone Trail: A 1.5 miles (2.4 km) trail traveling upstream from the main highway corridor.

Dispersed backcountry camping and off-trail hiking are permitted throughout the park and adjacent BLM boundaries, provided backpackers camp a minimum of 1 mile (1.6 km) away from any established trailheads.

== Recreation ==
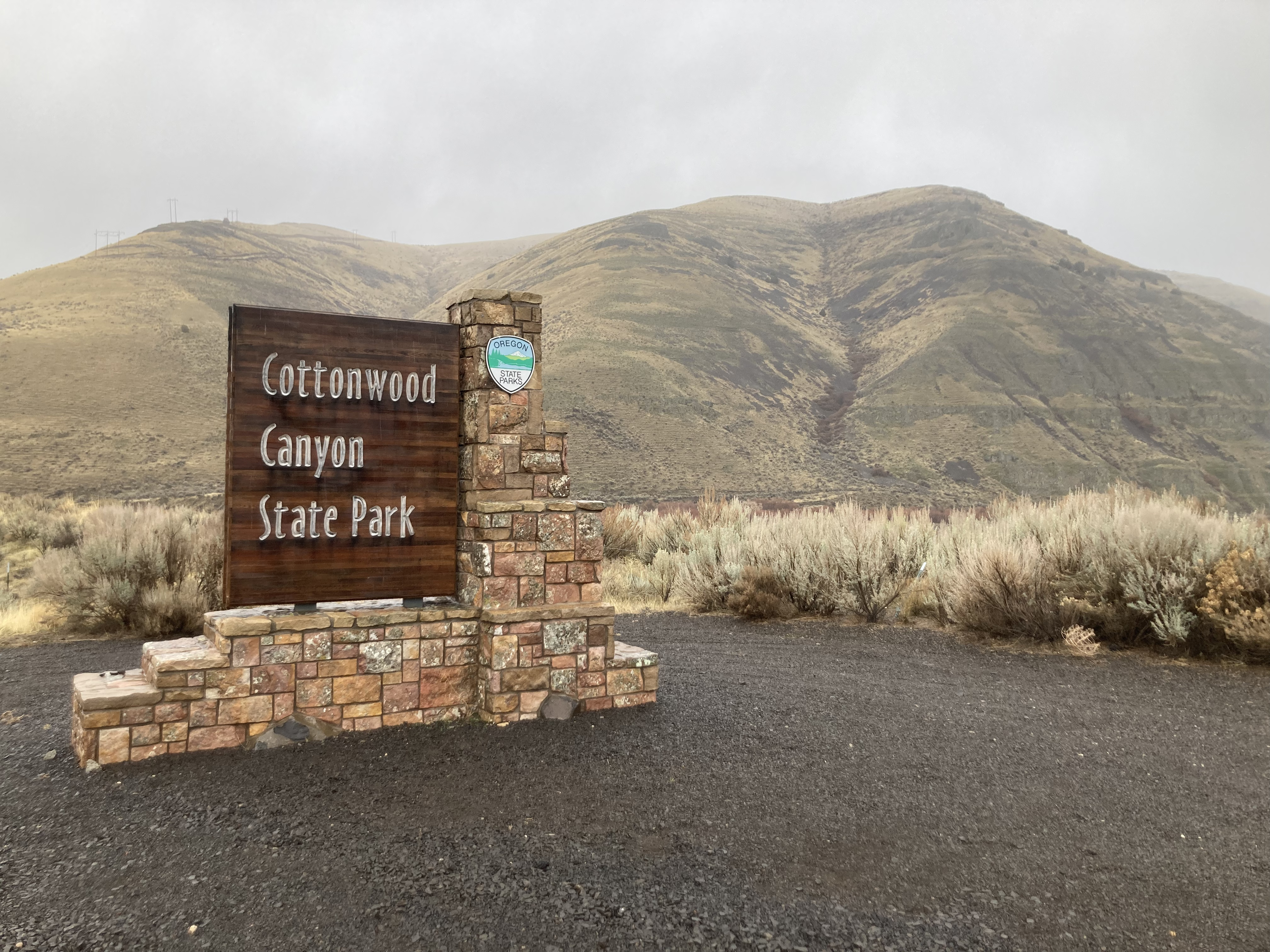
Entry sign

Hiking, camping, fishing, and river rafting are among the recreation possibilities in the park. A campground with 21 primitive sites, 4 cabins, 7 sites for hikers and bikers, a group camping area, potable water, and a restroom are near the park headquarters and the information building. Hiking trails include Pinnacles, in Sherman County, and Lost Corral, in Gilliam County, each of which follows the river downstream for 4.3 miles (6.9 km). On the upstream side of the highway, the Hard Stone Trail follows the river for 1.5 miles (2.4 km). In addition, old ranching roads that cross the park double as hiking trails, and an adjacent 10,000 acres (4,000 ha) of public land managed by the U.S. Bureau of Land Management offer further possibilities for hiking.

Horse trails wind through the Gilliam County segment of the park. The J. S. Burres day-use area, also in the Gilliam County segment, is a put-in place for boaters heading downriver and a take-out place for commercial and private groups running the John Day between Clarno and Route 206. Hunting, subject to Oregon Department of Fish and Wildlife regulations, is allowed in undeveloped parts of the park.

Cottonwood Canyon is also one of the darkest state parks in Oregon, which makes the park ideal for star gazing. The canyon provides an opportunity to stargaze that is hidden from lights from the surrounding areas and adjacent road.

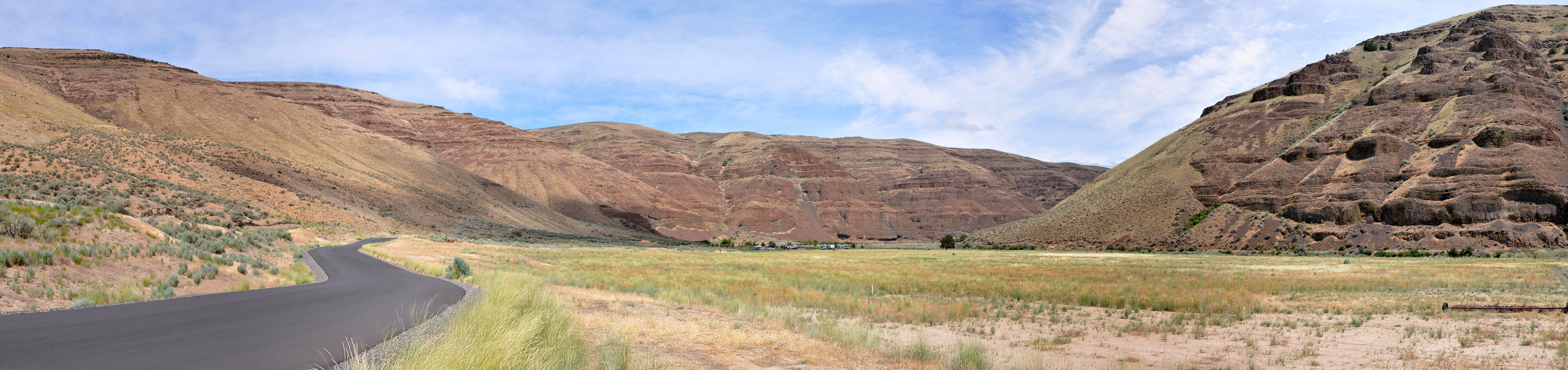
Looking downstream along the main park road in June 2016. Trailer campers in the distance.

== See also ==
- List of Oregon state parks
