= Mack Canyon Archeological Site =

- U.S. National Register of Historic Places
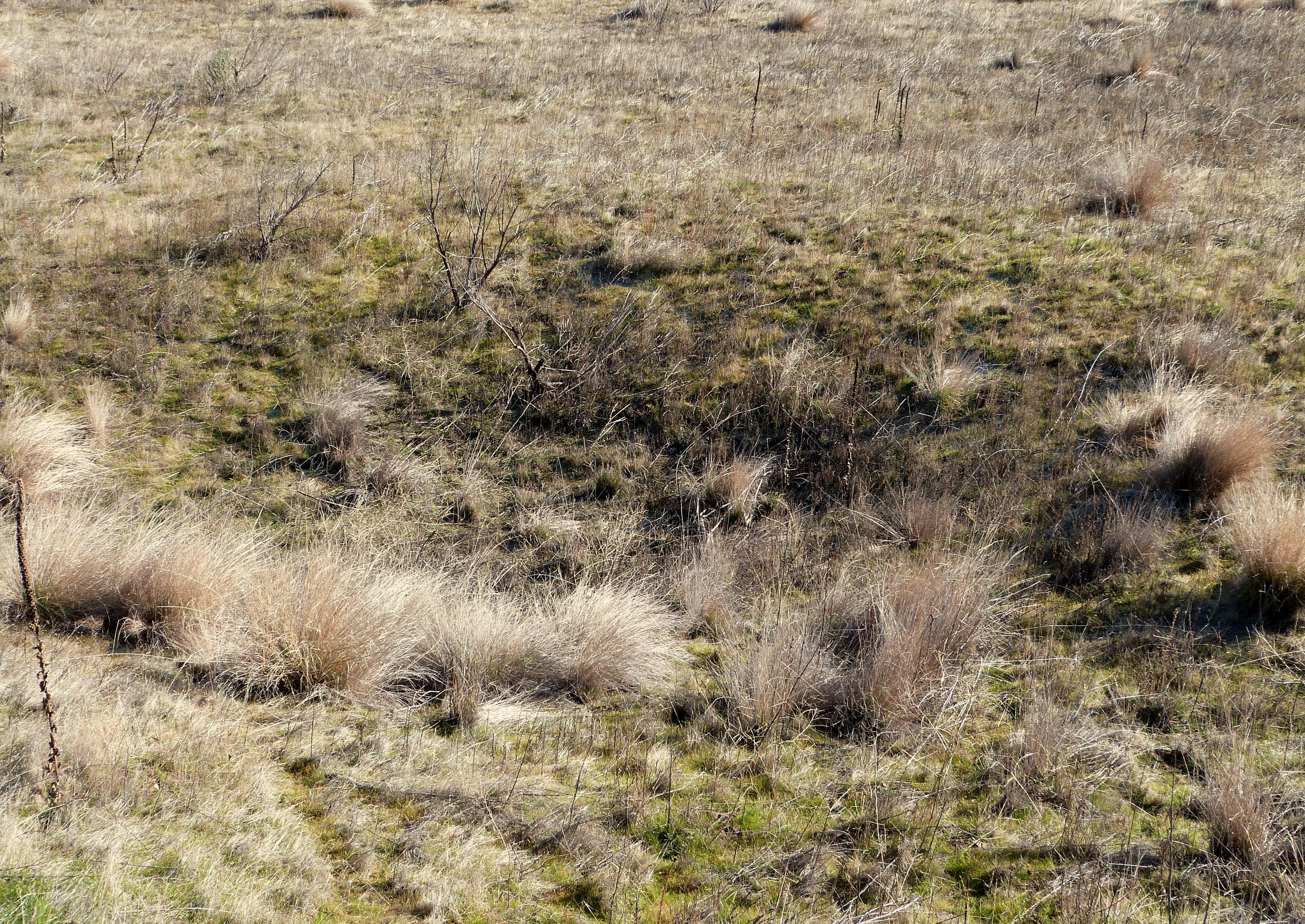
- Soil depression marking the location of a pit house at the Mack Canyon Site in 2013
- Location: Address restricted
- Nearest city: Grass Valley, Oregon
- Built: c. 5000 BCE – c. 1800 CE
- NRHP reference No.: 75001600
- Added to NRHP: August 22, 1975

The Mack Canyon Archeological Site (Smithsonian trinomial: 35SH23) is a prehistoric archaeological site in Sherman County, Oregon, United States. Consisting of an extensive series of pit houses in a sheltered canyon, the site was occupied seasonally in winter by Columbia River tribes for about 7,000 years from after 5000 BCE to the early 19th century CE.

The site was added to the National Register of Historic Places in 1975.

== See also ==
- National Register of Historic Places listings in Sherman County, Oregon
