= Columbia Southern =

Columbia Southern may refer to:

- Columbia-Southern Chemical Corporation, a heavy industrial chemical company
- Columbia Southern Hotel, a historic Oregon hotel
- Columbia Southern Railway, an Oregon rail line
- Columbia Southern Railway Passenger Station and Freight Warehouse, a historic Oregon building
- Columbia Southern University, an Alabama for-profit private university specializing in distance education

== See also ==
- British Columbia Southern Interior, a former British Columbia, Canada electoral district
- British Columbia Southern Railway, a railway stretching through parts of Canada and the United States
