= Biggs Junction, Oregon =

Unincorporated community in the state of Oregon, United States

- Census-designated place (CDP)
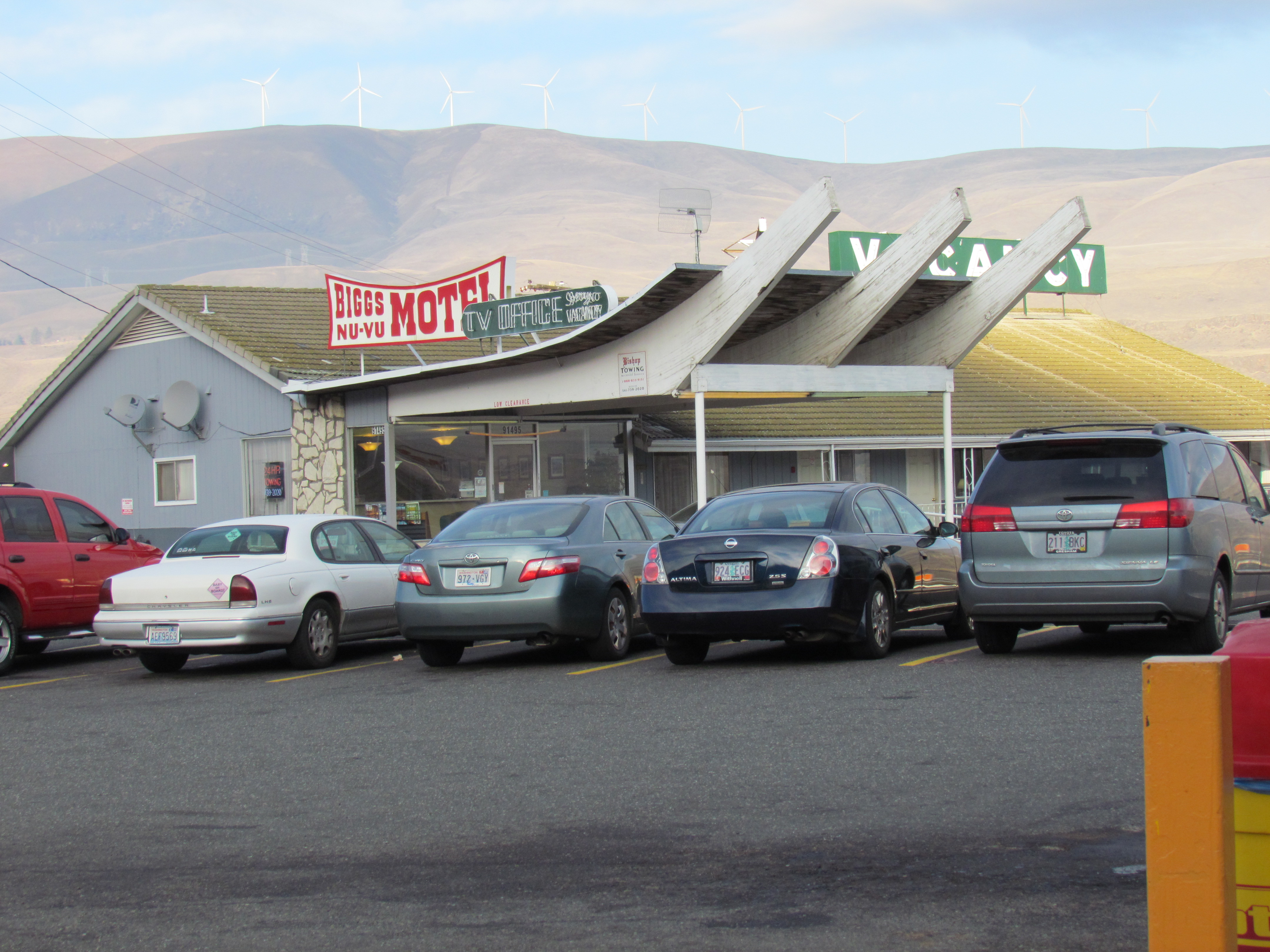
- Biggs Nu-Vu Motel

- Location of Biggs Junction, Oregon
- Coordinates: 45°39′50″N 120°50′21″W
- Country: United States
- State: Oregon
- County: Sherman

Area
  - Total: 0.89 sq mi (2.30 km^{2})
  - Land: 0.89 sq mi (2.30 km^{2})
  - Water: 0 sq mi (0.00 km^{2})
- Elevation: 384 ft (117 m)

Population (2020)
  - Total: 5
  - Density: 5.6/sq mi (2.18/km^{2})
- Time zone: UTC-8 (Pacific (PST))
  - Summer (DST): UTC-7 (PDT)
- ZIP code: 97065
- Area codes: 458 and 541
- FIPS code: 41-06400
- GNIS feature ID: 2407848

Biggs Junction is an unincorporated community and census-designated place (CDP) in Sherman County, Oregon, United States.

Biggs Junction is located on the south side of the Columbia River at the junction of Interstate 84/U.S. 30 and U.S. 97 where it crosses the Sam Hill Memorial Bridge over the river from Washington. The population was 5 at the 2020 census, down from 22 at the 2010 census

== History ==
Biggs is a station on the Union Pacific Railroad (UP) at what was once a junction with the UP's Grass Valley line to Kent that has since been abandoned. Biggs was named for a nearby landowner, W. H. Biggs, who settled in Sherman County in 1880. W. H. Biggs was born on May 12, 1831; he was from Ohio. The rail line was originally owned by the Oregon Railway and Navigation Company (OR&N). In 1885 the OR&N station at Biggs was called Spanish Hollow, after the canyon that opens on the river there. The canyon was said to be named because a Spanish ox died there in the days of the Oregon Trail, which runs parallel to U.S. 97. Biggs is where travelers on the Oregon Trail would first see the Columbia River after their overland journey. The current community of Biggs Junction was named for the station, which is less than a mile west of the current junction, and its location at the intersection of I-84 and U.S. 97. Biggs post office was established in 1884 and closed in 1954.

== Geography ==
According to the United States Census Bureau, the CDP has a total area of 0.8 square miles (2.1 km^{2}), all land.

Biggs Junction is across the Columbia River from Maryhill, Washington.

== Demographics ==
Historical population
Census	Pop.	Note	%±
2020	5		—
U.S. Decennial Census

As of the census of 2000, there were 50 people, 20 households, and 12 families residing in the CDP. The population density was 59.6 people per square mile (23.0 people/km^{2}). There were 22 housing units at an average density of 26.2 per square mile (10.1/km^{2}). The racial makeup of the CDP was 68.00% White, 6.00% Asian, 26.00% from other races. Hispanic or Latino of any race were 26.00% of the population.

There were 20 households, out of which 25.0% had children under the age of 18 living with them, 60.0% were married couples living together, and 40.0% were non-families. 40.0% of all households were made up of individuals, and 5.0% had someone living alone who was 65 years of age or older. The average household size was 2.50 and the average family size was 3.50.

In the CDP, the population was spread out, with 24.0% under the age of 18, 10.0% from 18 to 24, 26.0% from 25 to 44, 30.0% from 45 to 64, and 10.0% who were 65 years of age or older. The median age was 43 years. For every 100 females, there were 85.2 males. For every 100 females age 18 and over, there were 90.0 males.

The median income for a household in the CDP was $19,167, and the median income for a family was $66,250. Males had a median income of $40,750 versus $18,750 for females. The per capita income for the CDP was $19,532. Some 21.4% of families and 22.5% of the population were living below the poverty line, including no one under eighteen and none of those over 64.

== Economy ==
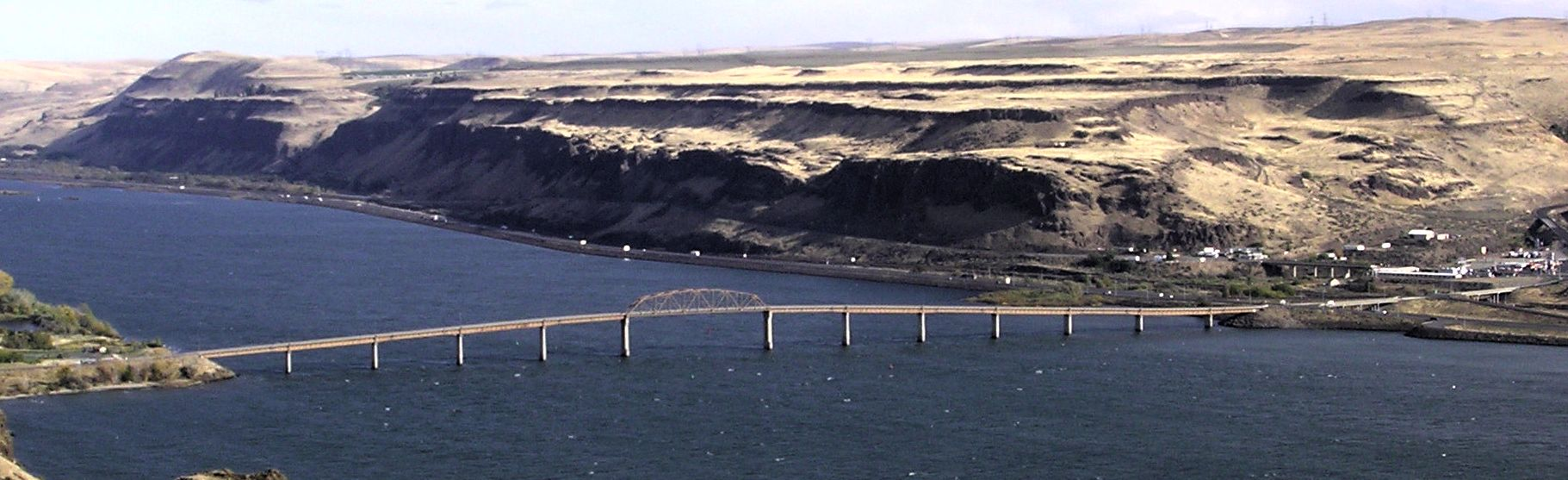
Biggs Junction (right) at the approach to the Sam Hill Memorial Bridge over the Columbia River

The community's major business is that of a rest and refueling stop for traffic along the two major highways. It is one of the largest truck stops on the Oregon section of I-84.

Biggs Junction is an important wheat shipping point, with grain storage elevators and facilities for shipping wheat by river barge and rail.

The Biggs Junction area is known for being a source and the point of discovery of Biggs jasper, a semi-precious gemstone. The jasper was originally used by the local Native Americans and was rediscovered in 1964 during the building of I-84 by road crews who were helping rebuild local bridges after the Christmas flood of that year.

== See also ==
- Columbia Southern Railway
