= Locust Grove, Oregon =

Unincorporated community in the state of Oregon, United States

- Unincorporated community
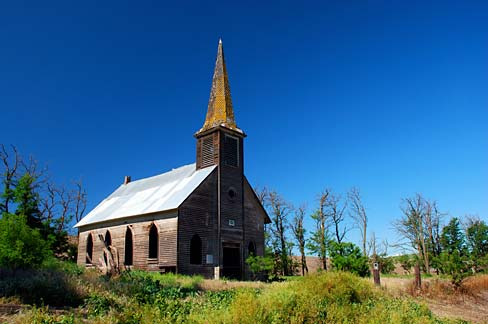
- Locust Grove Church; Gary Halvorson, Oregon State Archives

- Location within Oregon Location within the United States
- Coordinates: 45°35′55″N 120°47′20″W
- Country: United States
- State: Oregon
- County: Sherman
- Elevation: 1,120 ft (340 m)
- Time zone: UTC-8 (Pacific (PST))
  - Summer (DST): UTC-7 (PDT)
- ZIP code: 97065
- Area codes: 458 and 541

Locust Grove is an unincorporated community and ghost town in Sherman County, Oregon, United States. It is located on Oregon Route 206, six miles west of Wasco.

Established in 1895, the town's last burial occurred in 1914, and it has remained unoccupied since.
