= DeMoss Springs Park =

Park in Oregon, United States

- U.S. National Register of Historic Places
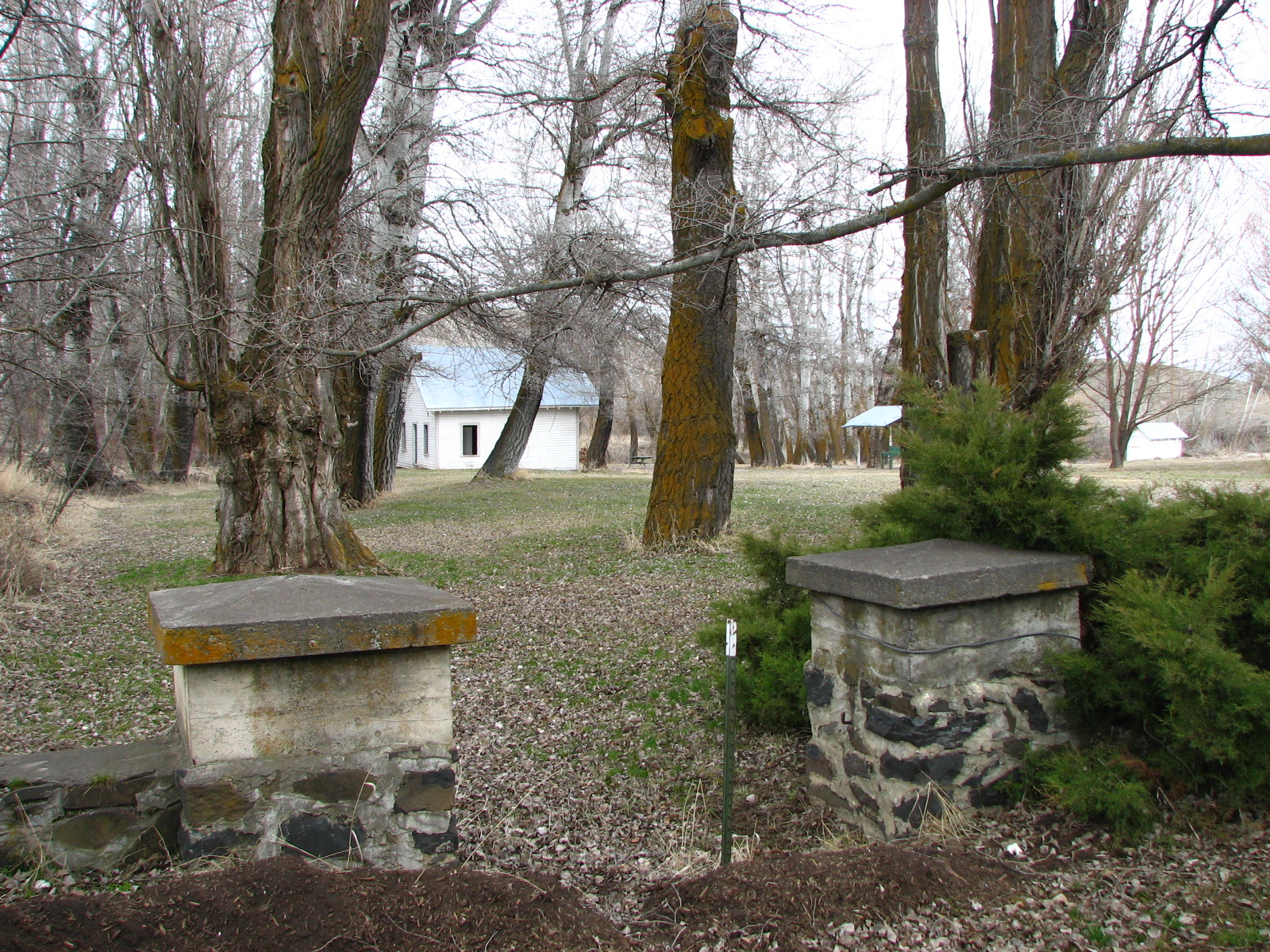

- Location within Oregon Location within the United States
- Nearest city: Moro, Oregon
- Coordinates: 45.5124°N 120.6827°W
- Area: 2.5 acres (1.0 ha)
- Built: 1897
- NRHP reference No.: 07000366
- Added to NRHP: April 12, 2007

DeMoss Springs Park is a park located near Moro, Oregon, listed on the National Register of Historic Places. The site was once the settlement of the DeMoss family, a noted family singing group that toured as the DeMoss Lyric Bards during the period 1872 to 1912. The family donated the land to the county as a park in 1897.

== See also ==
- National Register of Historic Places listings in Sherman County, Oregon
