= Wasco station (Oregon) =

- Columbia Southern Railroad Passenger Station and Freight Warehouse
- U.S. National Register of Historic Places
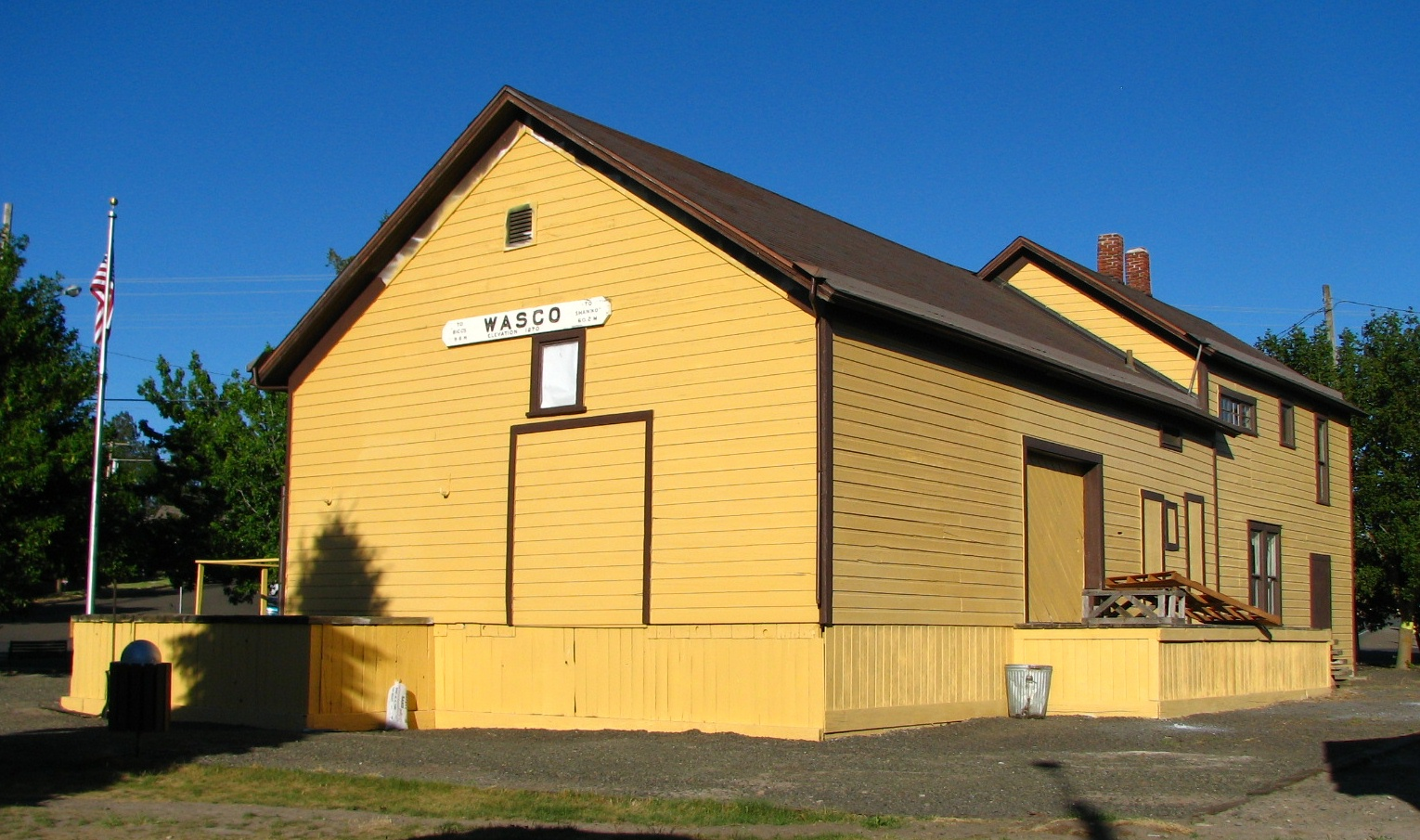
- The building's exterior in 2008

- Location within Oregon Location within the United States
- Location: Jct. of Clark and Fulton Sts., Wasco, Oregon
- Coordinates: 45°35′27″N 120°41′48″W
- Area: 0.2 acres (0.081 ha)
- Built: 1898
- NRHP reference No.: 91000059
- Added to NRHP: February 19, 1991

The Columbia Southern Railway Passenger Station and Freight Warehouse is a historic train station at the intersection of Clark and Fulton Streets in Wasco, Oregon. The station was built in 1898 by the Columbia Southern Railway as part of a new line connecting inland Oregon to the Columbia River. The Wasco depot served both passenger and freight trains along the route, which reached as far south as Shaniko and spurred economic development in the region. While the Oregon Trunk Railway's new line to Bend became the main inland Oregon route in 1911, the Columbia Southern route continued to serve Sherman County as a local route. Passenger service to Wasco ended in 1936, and a 1964 flood damaged the line severely enough to permanently end freight services as well.

The station was listed on the National Register of Historic Places on February 19, 1991.

== See also ==
- National Register of Historic Places listings in Sherman County, Oregon
