= Klondike Wind Farm =

Wind farm in Oregon, United States

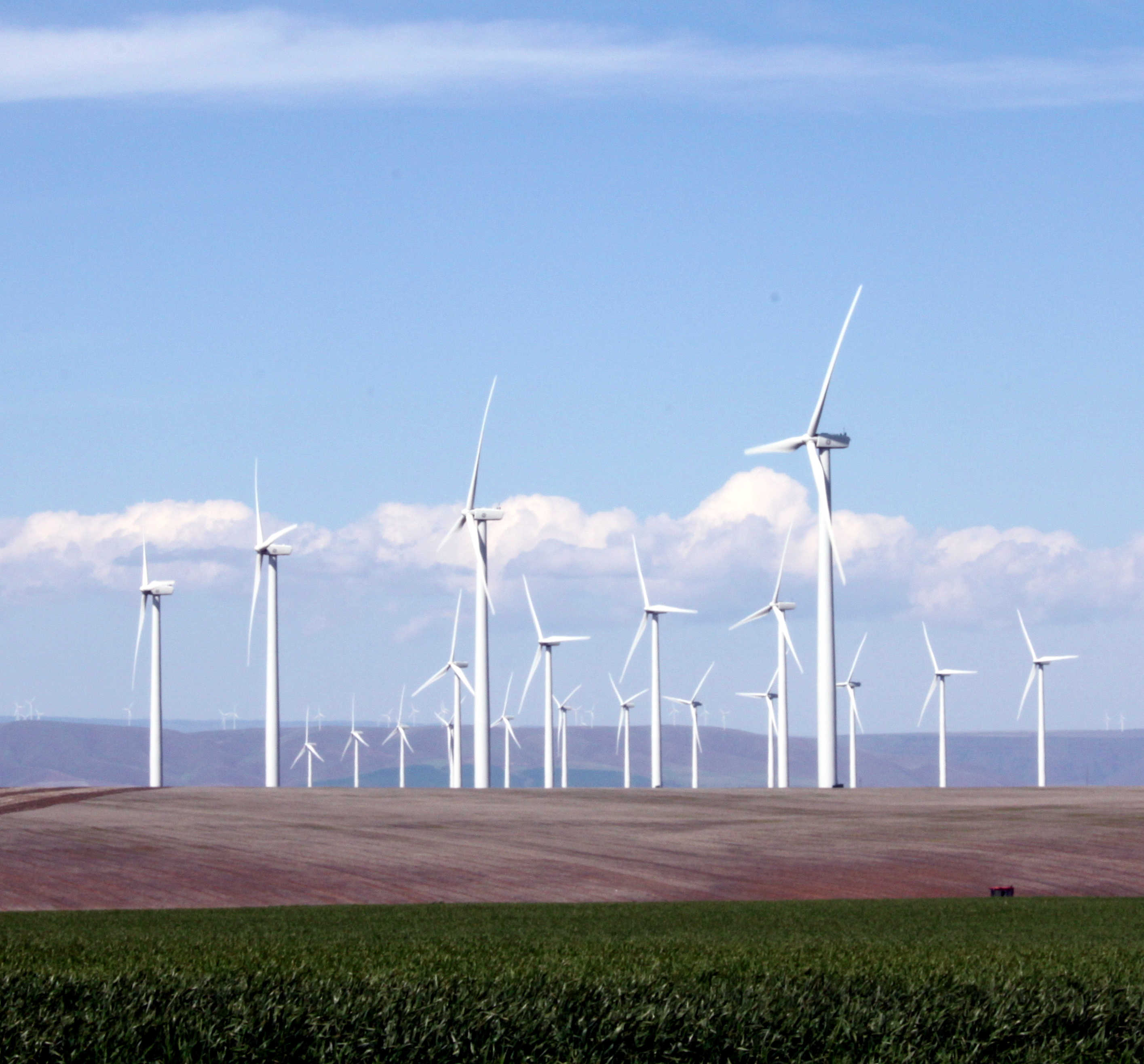
- Turbines at the Klondike Wind Farm
- Country: United States
- Location: Sherman County, near Wasco, Oregon
- Coordinates: 45°34′48″N 120°36′36″W
- Status: Operational
- Owner: Iberdrola

Wind farm
- Type: Onshore

Power generation
- Units operational: 197 x 1.5 MW; 44 x 2.3 MW; 1 x 2.4 MW
- Make and model: Enron Wind; General Electric
- Nameplate capacity: 399.1 MW

Klondike Wind farm is located in Sherman County, east of the small agricultural community of Wasco, in the north-central part of the U.S. state of Oregon. It was built in four phases and is owned and operated by Iberdrola. The first phase was built in 2001 and the latest in 2008.

Phase	Capacity (MW)	Type	number of turbines
Klondike I	24	Enron Wind	16
Klondike II	75	GE Energy	50
Klondike III	120	GE Energy	80
	101.2	Siemens	44
	2.4	Mitsubishi	1
Klondike IIIa	76.5	GE Energy	51
Total	399.1		242

The wind farm is currently a test site for some new wind turbines, notably the Mitsubishi MWT92, a 2.4 megawatt turbine with a rotor diameter larger than the wingspan of any production aircraft at 92 meters, manufactured in Japan. During the construction of the last phase, an accident killed one worker and injured another. Oregon OSHA fined the manufacturer for safety violations.
