= Oregon Raceway Park =

Road course facility in Oregon, US

Coordinates: 45.36235°N 120.7469°W

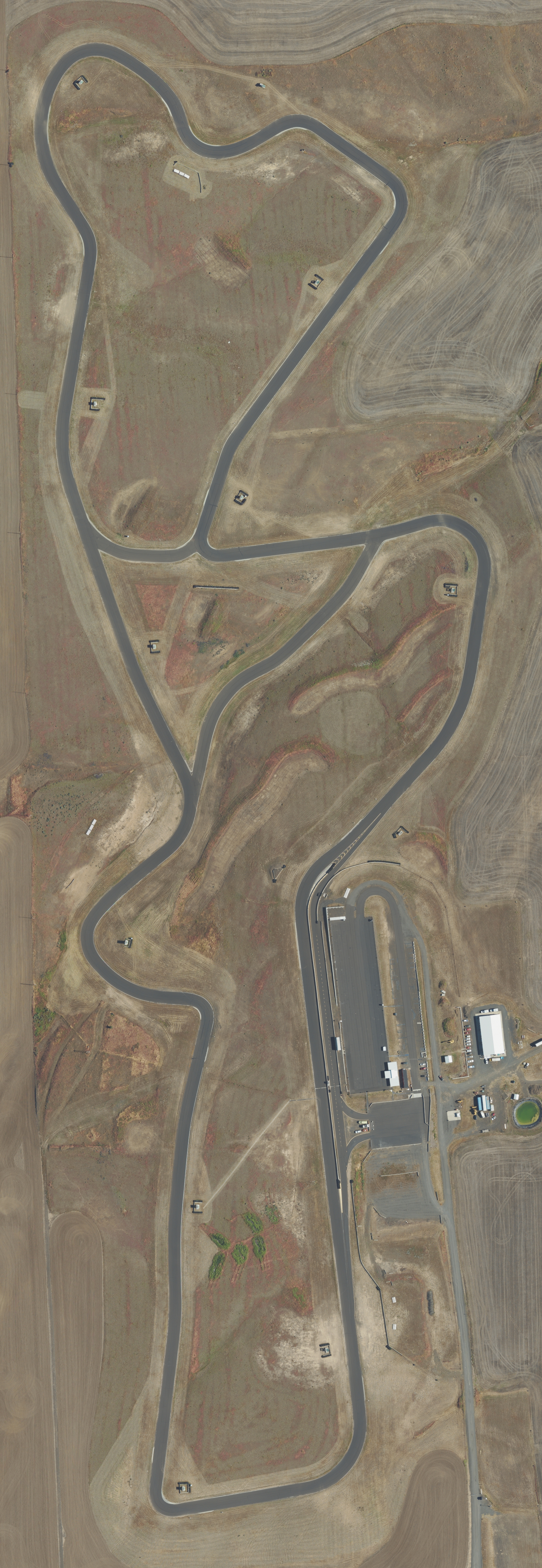
2022 aerial photo

Oregon Raceway Park is a 2.3-mile (3.7km) dedicated road course facility in Grass Valley, Oregon that hosts competitive automobile, kart and motorcycle events. It opened in November, 2008. Construction cost of the track was $3.2 million. The track has 16 turns, including one banked at 16 degrees. One lap covers 400 vertical feet.
