= Gladys Stone Wright =

American band director (1925–2025)

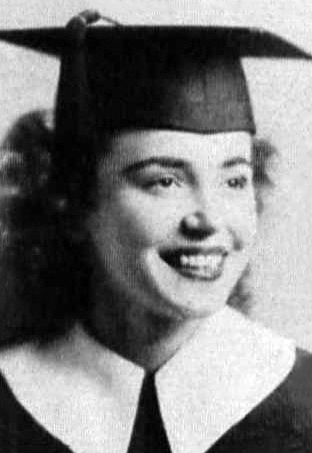
- Stone in 1948
- Born: March 8, 1925; Wasco, Oregon, U.S.
- Died: October 29, 2025 (aged 100)
- Education: University of Oregon
- Occupation: Music director
- Known for: Women Band Directors National Association founder
- Spouse: Al G. Wright
- Awards: National Band Association citation of excellence

Gladys Stone Wright (March 8, 1925 – October 29, 2025) was an American band director. She was among the first female band directors in the United States. Wright was also a composer, author, music judge, and clinician who won multiple awards for her work.

== Background ==
Wright was born on March 8, 1925, in Wasco, Oregon. Her childhood was spent in the heart of Oregon's wheat country. She started to learn music when she received a year's worth of free piano lessons along with a $5 clarinet. Wright attended Lebanon High School, where she was part of the school's band and newspaper. She graduated from high school in 1943, and studied at Willamette University for one year. She went to the University of Oregon a year later, where she received her undergraduate and master's degrees. Her husband was Purdue University band director Al G. Wright.

Gladys Stone Wright and Al G. Wright lived in West Lafayette, Indiana. She died on October 29, 2025, at the age of 100.

== Career ==
Wright was a high school band director at a time when that was considered an unusual job for a woman, and many school administrators were against hiring a woman for the position. She was the second woman to become a member of the American School Band Directors Association, which included 450 men. In Oregon, Wright conducted the band at Elmira Union High School for five years. During her final year at Elmira Union, the high school's band went to the Northwest Music Educators Conference. Wright said of the conference, "It was the only time they had had a woman director, and the clinic session was packed by male directors just to see what a woman could do." The male band directors applauded the performance.

She founded the Women Band Directors National Association, was a part of the North American Congress of Bands, and served as a member of various band-related organizations. Wright was the first woman to be a guest conductor with the United States Navy Band and the Goldman Band. Her school bands received "superior" ratings for 22 consecutive years. She was also a composer, author, music judge, and clinician. She has written for national magazines, and composed "The Big Bowl March" and "Trumpets and Tabards".

In 2024 and 2025, the University of Maryland Libraries' Michelle Smith Performing Arts Library hosted the exhibit, "Gladys Stone Wright: Promoting Women on the Band Podium," to celebrate the arrival of her personal papers at UMD's Special Collections in Performing Arts (SCPA).

== Awards ==
In 1969, Wright received a citation of excellence from the National Band Association. Wright won the Tau Beta Sigma "National Award for Service to Music" at the University of Michigan in 1971. The award "recognizes the contributions made by distinguished female conductors, composers, educators, administrators, artists, and clinicians" who have helped promote bands as a "musical art form". In 1999, Wright was the first woman to be elected to the National Hall of Fame of Distinguished Band Conductors. The day before her February 6 induction ceremony, she was the honored guest conductor of the Troy State University Symphony Band. The Gladys Stone Wright Scholarship is awarded by the Women Band Directors International to women who intend to have a career as a band director.
