= Kent, Oregon =

Unincorporated community in the state of Oregon, United States

- Unincorporated community
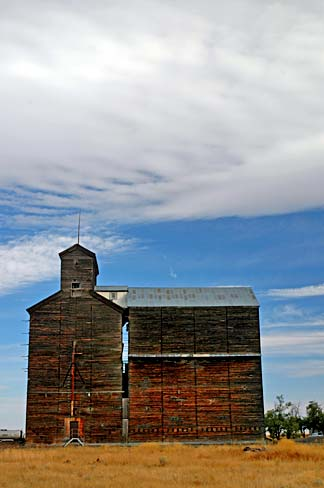
- Old grain elevator in Kent

- Location within Oregon Location within the United States
- Coordinates: 45°11′42″N 120°41′39″W
- Country: United States
- State: Oregon
- County: Sherman
- Elevation: 2,713 ft (827 m)
- Time zone: UTC-8 (Pacific (PST))
  - Summer (DST): UTC-7 (PDT)
- ZIP code: 97033
- Area codes: 458 and 541
- GNIS feature ID: 1122693

Kent is an unincorporated community in Sherman County, Oregon, United States. Kent has a post office with a ZIP code 97033. Kent lies at the intersection of U.S. Route 97 and Dobie Point Road, between Grass Valley to the north and Shaniko to the south.

== History ==
Kent was the site of a railway station, originally called Guthrie, on the Columbia Southern Railway. The name of the community stemmed from a drawing from a group of names submitted by local residents that was drawn out of a hat by Kent's first postmaster, according to the original residents. Milton H. Bennett was that postmaster, who ran the post office beginning in about 1887. The name was suggested because it was short and easy to write.

== Climate ==
This region experiences warm (but not hot) and dry summers, with no average monthly temperatures above 68.1 °F (20.1 °C). According to the Köppen Climate Classification system, Kent has a steppe climate, abbreviated "BSk" on climate maps.

Climate data for Kent, Oregon
Month	Jan	Feb	Mar	Apr	May	Jun	Jul	Aug	Sep	Oct	Nov	Dec	Year
Record high °F (°C)	63 (17)	69 (21)	77 (25)	89 (32)	97 (36)	103 (39)	107 (42)	108 (42)	102 (39)	92 (33)	77 (25)	65 (18)	108 (42)
Mean daily maximum °F (°C)	37.5 (3.1)	42.9 (6.1)	50.5 (10.3)	57.8 (14.3)	66.5 (19.2)	74.2 (23.4)	83.8 (28.8)	83 (28)	74.3 (23.5)	62.4 (16.9)	47.2 (8.4)	39.5 (4.2)	60 (16)
Mean daily minimum °F (°C)	22.9 (−5.1)	26.7 (−2.9)	30.5 (−0.8)	34.1 (1.2)	40 (4)	46.2 (7.9)	52.2 (11.2)	52 (11)	45.9 (7.7)	38 (3)	30 (−1)	25.3 (−3.7)	37 (3)
Record low °F (°C)	−17 (−27)	−19 (−28)	5 (−15)	14 (−10)	21 (−6)	26 (−3)	32 (0)	36 (2)	21 (−6)	9 (−13)	−10 (−23)	−18 (−28)	−19 (−28)
Average precipitation inches (mm)	1.4 (36)	1.08 (27)	1 (25)	0.93 (24)	1.02 (26)	0.87 (22)	0.35 (8.9)	0.38 (9.7)	0.57 (14)	0.87 (22)	1.47 (37)	1.48 (38)	11.42 (290)
Average snowfall inches (cm)	7 (18)	3.9 (9.9)	2.1 (5.3)	0.7 (1.8)	0 (0)	0 (0)	0 (0)	0 (0)	0.1 (0.25)	0.2 (0.51)	2.2 (5.6)	5.2 (13)	21.3 (54)
Average precipitation days	10	9	9	8	7	6	2	3	4	7	10	9	84

== See also ==
- Jack Knife Fire
