= De Moss Springs, Oregon =

Unincorporated community in the state of Oregon, United States

- Unincorporated community
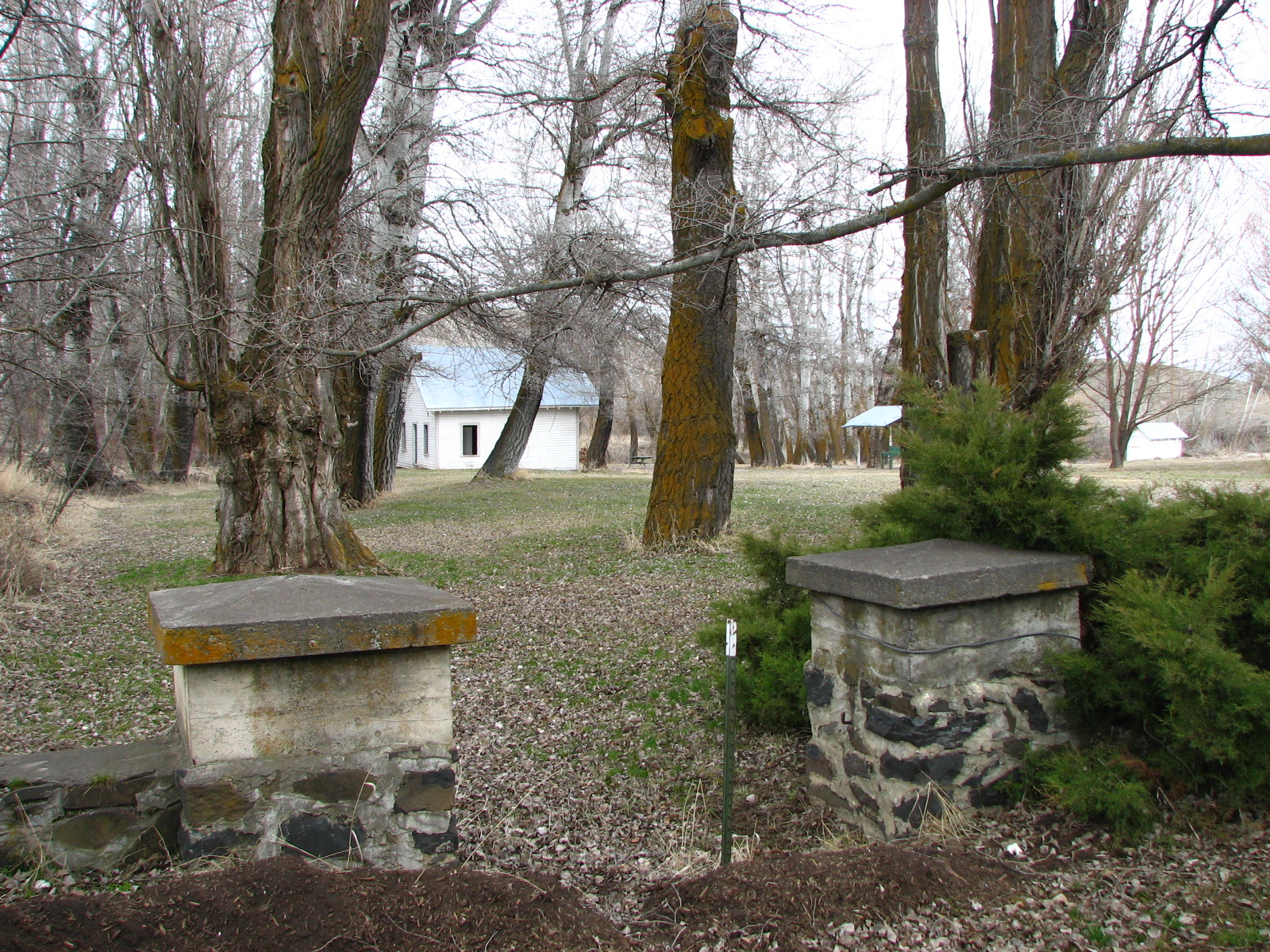
- De Moss Park

- Location within Oregon Location within the United States
- Coordinates: 45°30′40″N 120°40′59″W
- Country: United States
- State: Oregon
- County: Sherman
- Elevation: 1,572 ft (479 m)
- Time zone: UTC-8 (Pacific (PST))
  - Summer (DST): UTC-7 (PDT)
- Area codes: 458 and 541
- GNIS feature ID: 1158197

De Moss Springs is an unincorporated community in Sherman County, in the U.S. state of Oregon. It is about 3 miles (5 km) northeast of Moro along U.S. Route 97.

De Moss Springs had a post office from 1887 to 1923. In 1900, the Columbia Southern Railway established a station known as De Moss along its line to Shaniko. The springs and station were named for the De Moss family, which grew wheat, operated a recreation park at the springs, and formed a musical touring company called the Lyric Bards. The leader of the company, James M. De Moss, had moved to Sherman County from North Powder in 1883. He had managed the stagecoach station in North Powder.
