= Biggs jasper =

Variety of the mineral jasper

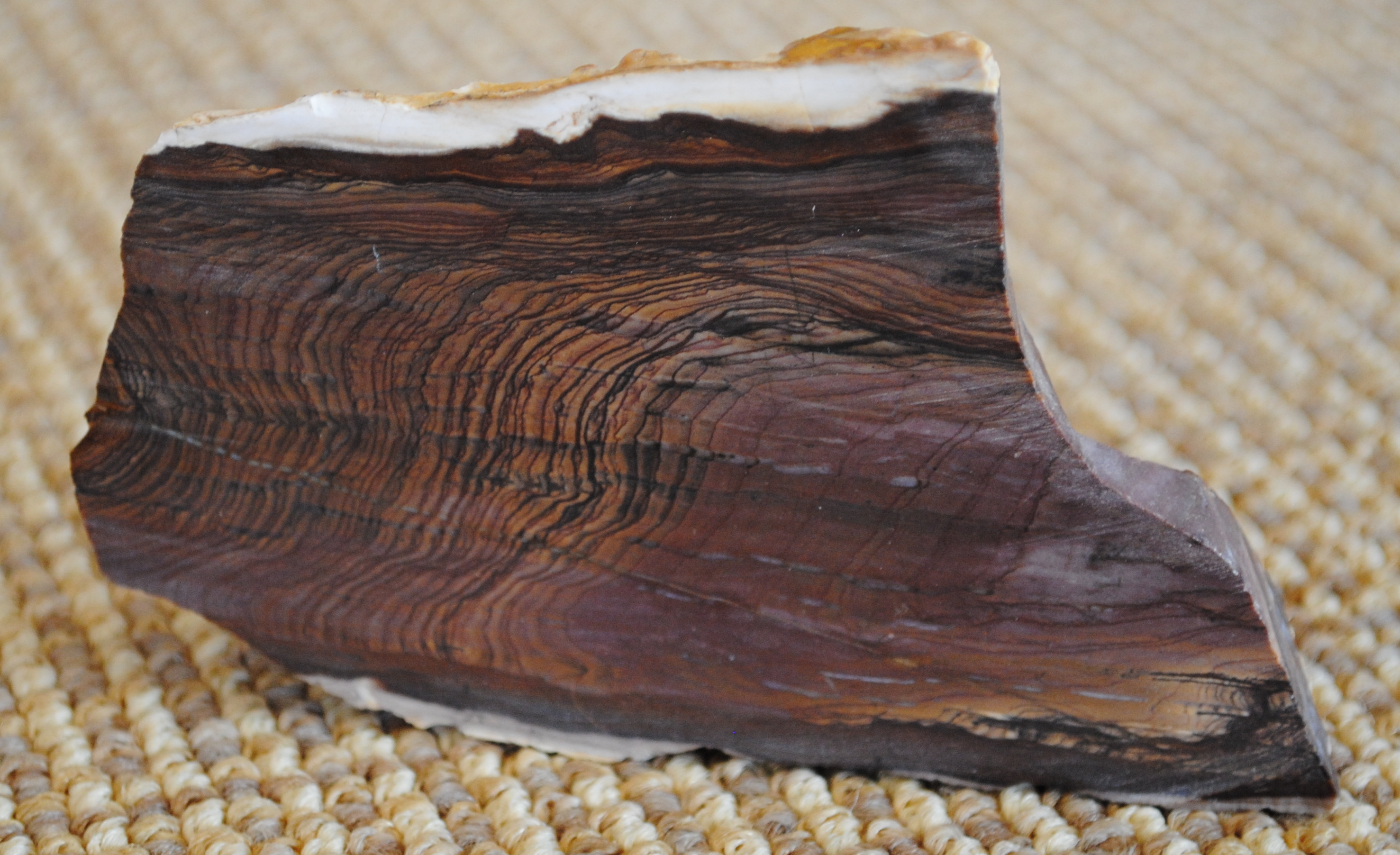
A piece of Biggs jasper

Biggs jasper is a variety of the mineral jasper. It is a "picture jasper" – a jasper that exhibits particular patterns and colors – and is used as an opaque gemstone. It exhibits intricate, shell- or layer-like patterns in shades of brown ranging from beige to dark brown.

The stone was first discovered around 1960 near Biggs Junction, Oregon, and is found in the basalt deposits of the American Pacific Northwest. Biggs jasper was formed as mud from volcanic ash was deposited on basalt terrain, and subsequently heated and compressed through volcanic activity. Because of this sedimentary origin, it is relatively rare, and is valued as a gemstone.

== Discovery ==
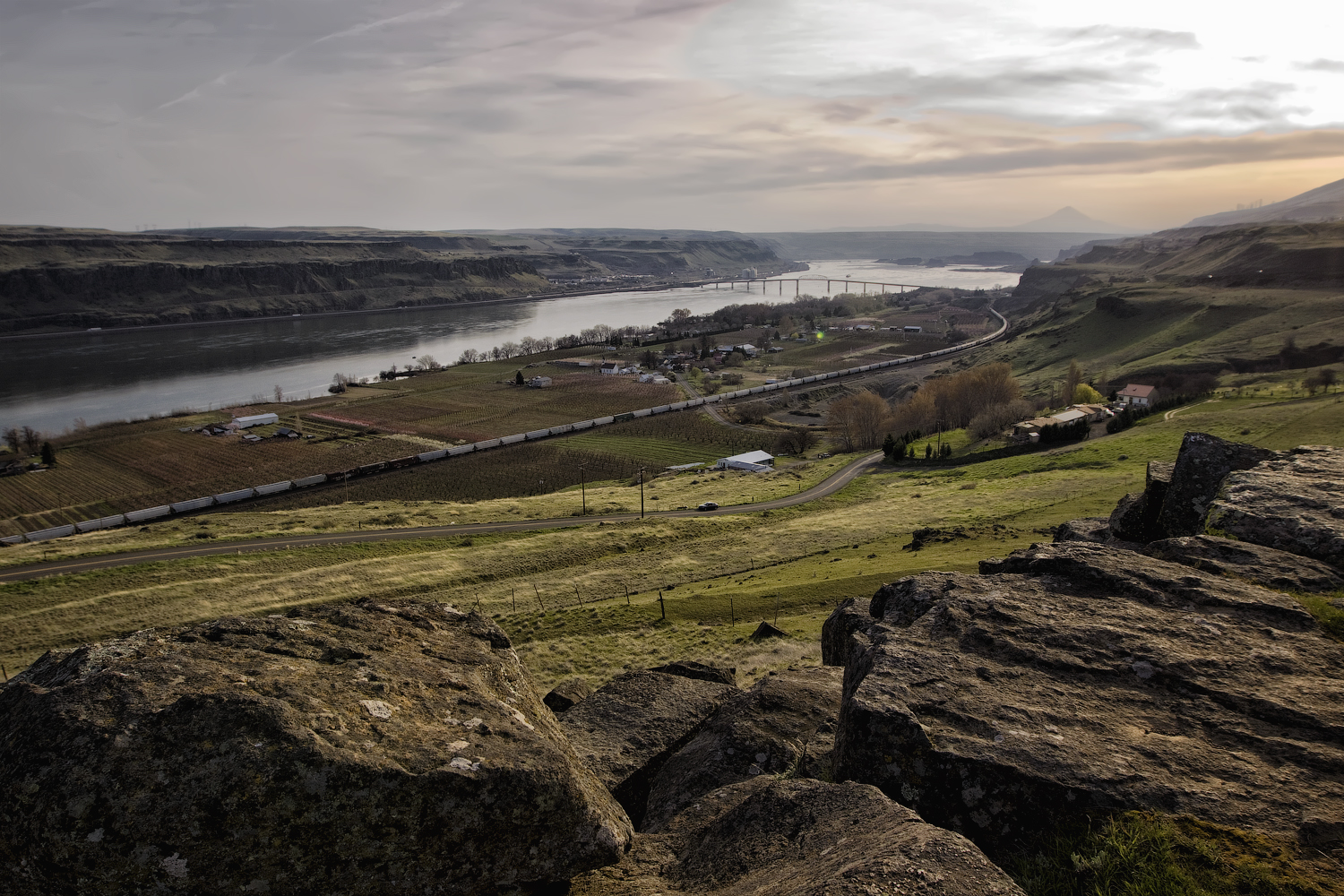
The stone is found near Biggs Junction, Oregon (in the background on the far side of the Columbia River).

Biggs jasper was first found around 1960 at the bottom of a creek near Biggs Junction, Oregon, after possibly being carried some distance by water from the outcrop where it originated, and more of the stone was found in the 1960s, particularly during road works in 1966 when U.S. Route 97 was relocated through a canyon south of Biggs Junction. Road workers found the jasper in a rock cut, collected it and sold it to rock shops. This brought the attractive stone to the attention of collectors, who began to search for it around Biggs Junction.

== Geology ==
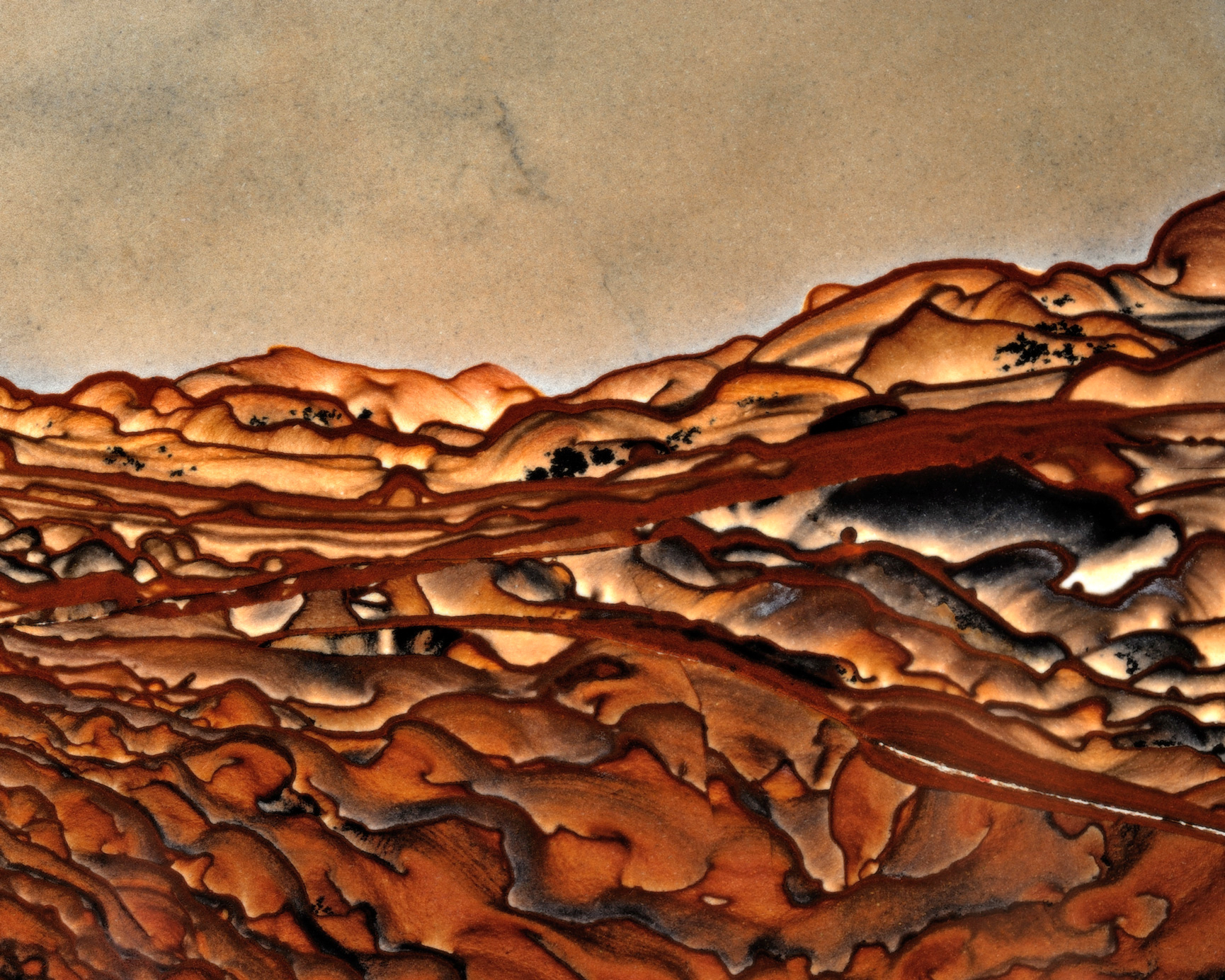
In this piece of Biggs jasper, the border between the jasper at the bottom and the untransformed rock not reached by heat and pressure is visible.

Biggs jasper is found between two of the basalt lava flows that once covered the U.S. states of Oregon, Washington and parts of Idaho. Many thousands of years passed between the individual flows, allowing life to flourish. During this time, the volcanic ash decomposed into clay and was deposited by rain water in streams and lakes atop the cooled basalt. There it mixed with silica and iron from the weathering of the then-recent igneous rocks, forming a plastic colloid.

When lava next flowed over it, the heat and pressure transformed the muddy mixture. As water escaped it in the form of superheated steam, pressure variations resulted in flexing and many short fluctuating changes, reflected in the jasper's many thin, parallel bands. The hydrothermal reaction progressed as a shock wave through the mud, removing iron from it and depositing the iron as intertwining bands of limonite. The altered rock remained plastic, and subject to local movement as a result of pressure changes. These caused the great variety of marbled, rosette-like and picture designs found in Biggs jasper.

Near Biggs jasper a stratum of white clay is sometimes found, locally named "wascoite" for the town of Wasco, Oregon. It is probably the end form of much-weathered volcanic debris. Also often found together with Biggs jasper is a dark gray, somewhat translucent chert. It formed from colloidal silica released from the volcanic debris. Because of their different physical properties, water movement separated the two colloids from which the chert and Biggs jasper resulted from each other, so that both were deposited in nearly pure form.

== Use ==
Biggs jasper is used as a gemstone in bolo tie stones, necklaces, bracelets, brooches and other jewelry. It is also of interest to mineral collectors, who sometimes cut slabs of it to resemble landscapes beneath a realistic-looking sky.
