= McDonald, Oregon =

Unincorporated community in the state of Oregon, United States

- Unincorporated community
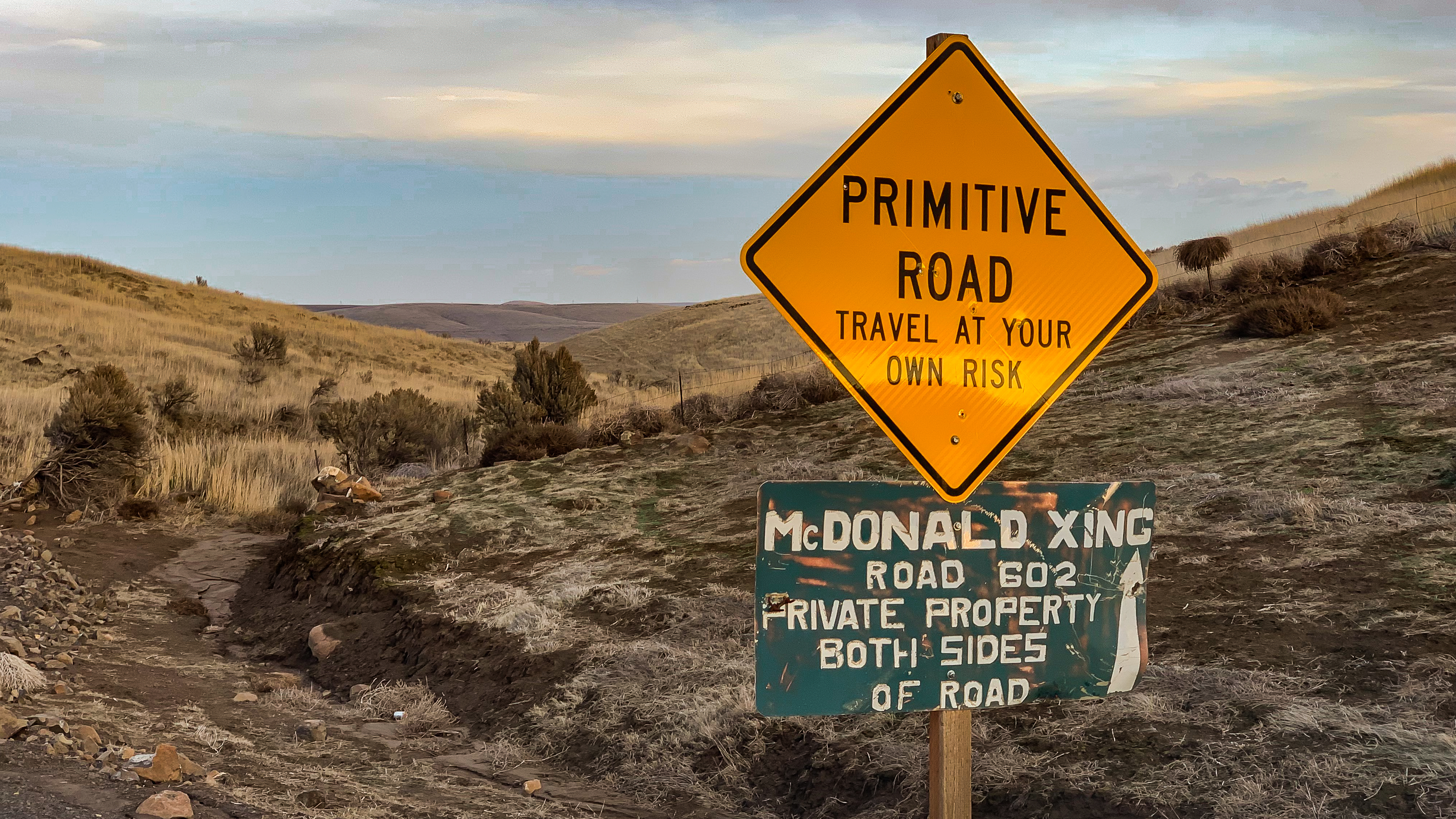
- McDonald crossing

- Location within Oregon Location within the United States
- Coordinates: 45.589°N 120.41°W
- Country: United States
- State: Oregon
- County: Sherman
- Elevation: 404 ft (123 m)
- Time zone: UTC-8 (Pacific (PST))
  - Summer (DST): UTC-7 (PDT)
- ZIP code: 97065
- Area codes: 458 and 541

McDonald is an unincorporated community in Sherman County, Oregon, United States. Its post office was established on the John Day River on March 15, 1904, and closed on October 14, 1922. The first postmaster was William G. McDonald.
