= Sherman County, Oregon =

County in Oregon, United States

- County
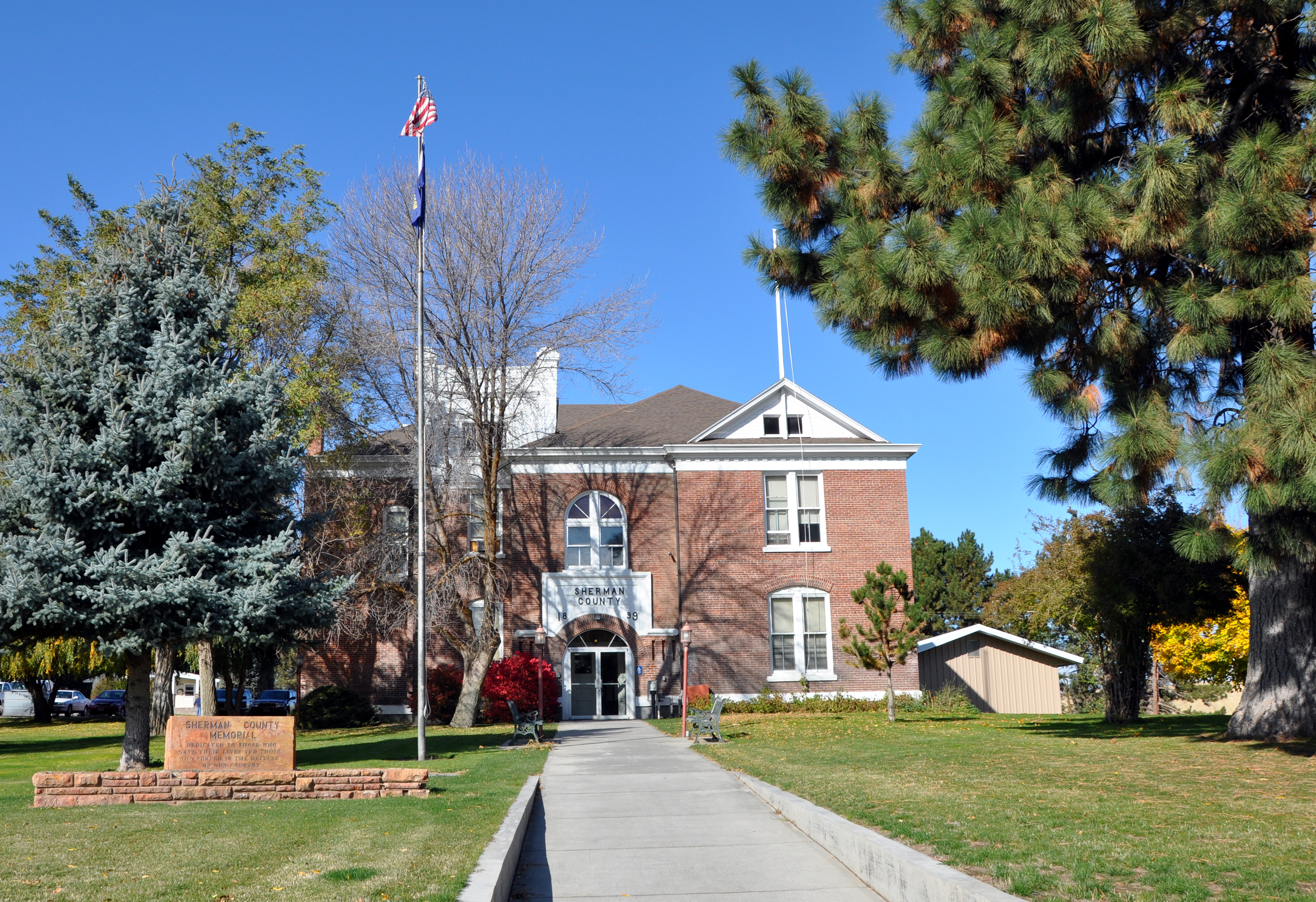
- Sherman County Courthouse in Moro

- Location within the U.S. state of Oregon
- Coordinates: 45°25′N 120°41′W
- Country: United States
- State: Oregon
- Founded: February 25, 1889
- Named for: William T. Sherman
- Seat: Moro
- Largest city: Wasco

Area
  - Total: 831 sq mi (2,150 km^{2})
  - Land: 824 sq mi (2,130 km^{2})
  - Water: 7.5 sq mi (19 km^{2}) 0.9%

Population (2020)
  - Total: 1,870
  - Estimate (2025): 2,051 ▲
  - Density: 2.1/sq mi (0.81/km^{2})
- Time zone: UTC−8 (Pacific)
  - Summer (DST): UTC−7 (PDT)
- Congressional district: 2nd
- Website: www.shermancountyor.gov

Sherman County is one of the 36 counties in the U.S. state of Oregon. As of the 2020 census, the population was 1,870, making it the second-least populous county in Oregon after nearby Wheeler. The county seat is Moro, and the largest city is Wasco. The county is named for William Tecumseh Sherman, a Union general in the American Civil War.

== History ==
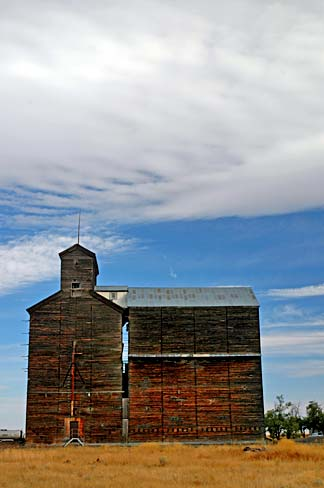
Old grain elevator in Kent

As the pioneers felt crowded in the new settlements of western Oregon, they turned east to the Columbia Plateau for new opportunities. The county's first white settler was William Graham, who located at the mouth of the Deschutes River in 1858. Homesteaders, eager for land, arrived in the 1880s by steamboat, stagecoach and wagon. Soon farmers received government patents.

As the population grew, so did the sentiment for independence from Wasco County. Sherman County was created on February 25, 1889, out of the northeast corner of Wasco County. The county's borders have been changed only once, in 1891, when the Legislative Assembly moved the county line 18 miles (29 km) farther south into Wasco County.

The town of Wasco was designated the county seat by the Legislative Assembly although this designation was contested between Wasco and Moro. Following the addition of a portion of Wasco County, Moro became the eventual winner.

== Geography ==
Sherman County is located in the central northern part of Oregon, east of the Cascade Range. It lies between the John Day River to the east and the Deschutes River to the west, which defines the borders of the county. On the northern border of the county is the Columbia River. Sherman County is mostly flat, being part of the Columbia Plateau; its highest point is at an unknown location at 3,004 feet (916m).

According to the United States Census Bureau, the county has a total area of 831 square miles (2,150 km^{2}), of which 824 square miles (2,130 km^{2}) is land and 7.5 square miles (19 km^{2}) (0.9%) is water.

=== Adjacent counties ===
- Klickitat County, Washington - north
- Gilliam County - east
- Wasco County - southwest

Map of Sherman County

== Demographics ==
Historical population
Census	Pop.	Note	%±
1890	1,792		—
1900	3,477		94.0%
1910	4,242		22.0%
1920	3,826		−9.8%
1930	2,978		−22.2%
1940	2,321		−22.1%
1950	2,271		−2.2%
1960	2,446		7.7%
1970	2,139		−12.6%
1980	2,172		1.5%
1990	1,918		−11.7%
2000	1,934		0.8%
2010	1,765		−8.7%
2020	1,870		5.9%
2025 (est.)	2,051	▲	9.7%
U.S. Decennial Census; 1790–1960 1900–1990; 1990–2000 2010–2020

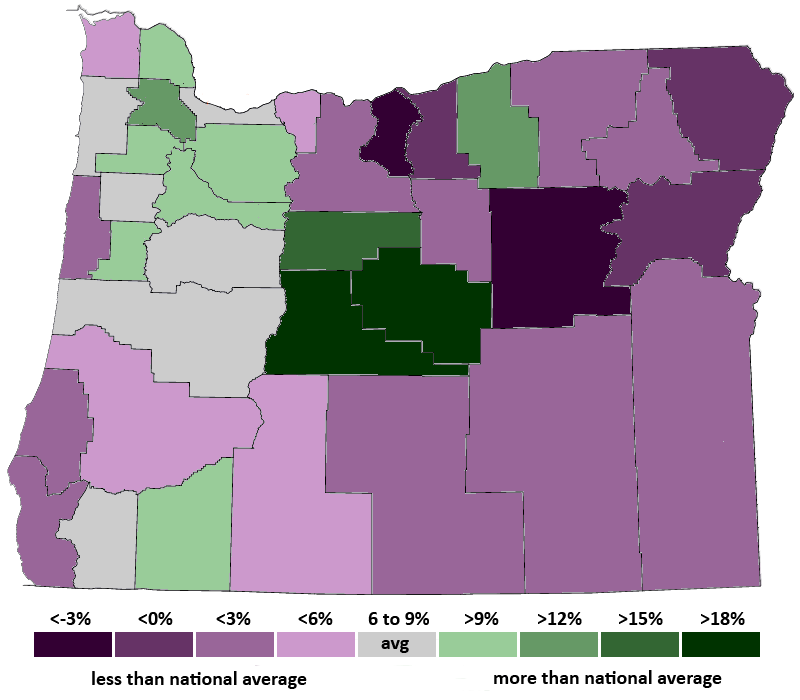
From 2000 to 2007, Sherman County lost 4.1% of its population, the second-lowest growth rate in the state.

=== 2020 census ===
Sherman County, Oregon – Racial and ethnic composition Note: the US Census treats Hispanic/Latino as an ethnic category. This table excludes Latinos from the racial categories and assigns them to a separate category. Hispanics/Latinos may be of any race.
Race / Ethnicity (NH = Non-Hispanic)	Pop 1980	Pop 1990	Pop 2000	Pop 2010	Pop 2020	% 1980	% 1990	% 2000	% 2010	% 2020
White alone (NH)	2,118	1,853	1,782	1,616	1,610	97.51%	96.61%	92.14%	91.56%	86.10%
Black or African American alone (NH)	3	0	0	2	0	0.14%	0.00%	0.00%	0.11%	0.00%
Native American or Alaska Native alone (NH)	5	24	27	21	19	0.23%	1.25%	1.40%	1.19%	1.02%
Asian alone (NH)	11	13	8	3	7	0.51%	0.68%	0.41%	0.17%	0.37%
Native Hawaiian or Pacific Islander alone (NH)	x	x	0	1	0	x	x	0.00%	0.06%	0.00%
Other race alone (NH)	4	0	0	6	3	0.18%	0.00%	0.00%	0.34%	0.16%
Mixed race or Multiracial (NH)	x	x	23	18	112	x	x	1.19%	1.02%	5.99%
Hispanic or Latino (any race)	31	28	94	98	119	1.43%	1.46%	4.86%	5.55%	6.36%
Total	2,172	1,918	1,934	1,765	1,870	100.00%	100.00%	100.00%	100.00%	100.00%

As of the 2020 census, the county had a population of 1,870. Of the residents, 19.4% were under the age of 18 and 24.3% were 65 years of age or older; the median age was 46.3 years. For every 100 females there were 104.4 males, and for every 100 females age 18 and over there were 107.1 males. 0.0% of residents lived in urban areas and 100.0% lived in rural areas.

The racial makeup of the county was 87.9% White, 0.0% Black or African American, 1.0% American Indian and Alaska Native, 0.4% Asian, 0.2% Native Hawaiian and Pacific Islander, 2.2% from some other race, and 8.3% from two or more races. Hispanic or Latino residents of any race comprised 6.4% of the population.

There were 826 households in the county, of which 25.9% had children under the age of 18 living with them and 19.7% had a female householder with no spouse or partner present. About 30.3% of all households were made up of individuals and 16.3% had someone living alone who was 65 years of age or older.

There were 918 housing units, of which 10.0% were vacant. Among occupied housing units, 68.2% were owner-occupied and 31.8% were renter-occupied. The homeowner vacancy rate was 1.4% and the rental vacancy rate was 8.7%.

=== 2010 census ===
As of the 2010 census, there were 1,765 people, 777 households, and 492 families living in the county. The population density was 2.1 inhabitants per square mile (0.81/km^{2}). There were 918 housing units at an average density of 1.1 per square mile (0.42/km^{2}). The racial makeup of the county was 93.4% white, 1.6% American Indian, 0.2% black or African American, 0.2% Asian, 0.1% Pacific islander, 2.7% from other races, and 1.8% from two or more races. Those of Hispanic or Latino origin made up 5.6% of the population. In terms of ancestry, 22.6% were German, 16.5% were English, 13.0% were Irish, and 4.9% were American.

Of the 777 households, 23.0% had children under the age of 18 living with them, 51.2% were married couples living together, 7.5% had a female householder with no husband present, 36.7% were non-families, and 30.5% of all households were made up of individuals. The average household size was 2.27 and the average family size was 2.84. The median age was 48.2 years.

The median income for a household in the county was $41,354 and the median income for a family was $52,361. Males had a median income of $42,768 versus $32,386 for females. The per capita income for the county was $21,688. About 13.9% of families and 20.0% of the population were below the poverty line, including 38.2% of those under age 18 and 9.9% of those age 65 or over.

=== 2000 census ===
As of the 2000 census, there were 1,934 people, 797 households, and 545 families living in the county. The population density was 2 (2,3) people per square mile (1/km^{2}). There were 935 housing units at an average density of 1 per square mile (0/km^{2}). The racial makeup of the county was 93.59% White, 0.21% Black or African American, 1.40% Native American, 0.47% Asian, 2.79% from other races, and 1.55% from two or more races. 4.86% of the population were Hispanic or Latino of any race. 20.5% were of German, 17.3% American, 11.7% English, 8.7% Irish and 5.3% Norwegian ancestry.

There were 797 households, out of which 29.90% had children under the age of 18 living with them, 58.50% were married couples living together, 6.50% had a female householder with no husband present, and 31.50% were non-families. 28.70% of all households were made up of individuals, and 14.10% had someone living alone who was 65 years of age or older. The average household size was 2.43 and the average family size was 2.97.

In the county, the population was spread out, with 26.40% under the age of 18, 5.80% from 18 to 24, 23.40% from 25 to 44, 26.10% from 45 to 64, and 18.30% who were 65 years of age or older. The median age was 42 years. For every 100 females there were 102.90 males. For every 100 females age 18 and over, there were 105.00 males.

The median income for a household in the county was $35,142, and the median income for a family was $42,563. Males had a median income of $31,207 versus $21,579 for females. The per capita income for the county was $17,448. About 12.30% of families and 14.60% of the population were below the poverty line, including 20.20% of those under age 18 and 7.70% of those age 65 or over.

== Government and infrastructure ==
The Northern Oregon Regional Corrections Facility (Norcor), a short-term jail, serves Sherman, Gilliam, Hood River, and Wasco counties. Although Sherman County is located in Central Oregon, its politics are more-aligned with the eastern parts of the state with most of its voters being affiliated with the Republican Party. No Democrat has carried this county in a presidential election since Lyndon Johnson in 1964. The last time a Democrat had won over 400 votes here was in 1996 with Bill Clinton, who lost the county to Bob Dole by a margin of 32 votes.

United States presidential election results for Sherman County, Oregon
Year	Republican		Democratic		Third party(ies)	
Year	No.	%	No.	%	No.	%
1904	701	71.10%	163	16.53%	122	12.37%
1908	437	58.27%	252	33.60%	61	8.13%
1912	244	34.86%	232	33.14%	224	32.00%
1916	717	46.86%	747	48.82%	66	4.31%
1920	893	65.57%	423	31.06%	46	3.38%
1924	756	55.92%	367	27.14%	229	16.94%
1928	759	66.35%	375	32.78%	10	0.87%
1932	423	38.04%	665	59.80%	24	2.16%
1936	337	27.78%	823	67.85%	53	4.37%
1940	575	46.07%	670	53.69%	3	0.24%
1944	475	47.69%	518	52.01%	3	0.30%
1948	532	53.20%	454	45.40%	14	1.40%
1952	747	67.48%	355	32.07%	5	0.45%
1956	671	61.50%	420	38.50%	0	0.00%
1960	659	56.57%	506	43.43%	0	0.00%
1964	494	36.51%	859	63.49%	0	0.00%
1968	646	59.32%	384	35.26%	59	5.42%
1972	677	64.91%	330	31.64%	36	3.45%
1976	567	51.13%	491	44.27%	51	4.60%
1980	677	57.86%	389	33.25%	104	8.89%
1984	828	67.48%	398	32.44%	1	0.08%
1988	555	54.63%	435	42.81%	26	2.56%
1992	424	37.99%	362	32.44%	330	29.57%
1996	476	44.61%	444	41.61%	147	13.78%
2000	679	63.94%	326	30.70%	57	5.37%
2004	694	62.86%	390	35.33%	20	1.81%
2008	634	60.55%	385	36.77%	28	2.67%
2012	678	66.08%	319	31.09%	29	2.83%
2016	732	71.98%	202	19.86%	83	8.16%
2020	921	76.24%	260	21.52%	27	2.24%
2024	890	76.53%	233	20.03%	40	3.44%

== Economy ==
Sherman County is predominantly an agricultural county, its economy receiving some aid from ranching and tourism. Its farms primarily produce wheat and barley. It is also home to the Biglow Canyon Wind Farm, the largest project of its kind in Oregon.

Press reports indicate the county workforce is fewer than one thousand. Of these, 143 are employed by the federal government, the highest proportion of any county in the state.

== Communities ==
=== Cities ===
- Grass Valley
- Moro (county seat)
- Rufus
- Wasco

=== Census-designated place ===
- Biggs Junction

=== Unincorporated communities ===
- De Moss Springs
- Erskine
- Harmony
- Hay Canyon
- Kent
- Klondike
- Locust Grove
- Rutledge
- McDonald
- Monkland

=== Former communities ===
- Early
- Boardman
- Biglow
- Emigrant Springs
- Lone Rock
- Webfoot

== See also ==
- National Register of Historic Places listings in Sherman County, Oregon

== Newspapers ==
- Current - The Times-Journal

Moro Bulletin.

- Moro Leader. (1898— )
- Moro Observer/Sherman County Observer. (1897—1931)
- Sherman County Journal. (1931— )
- Sherman County News. (1927— )
