= Moro, Oregon =

- City
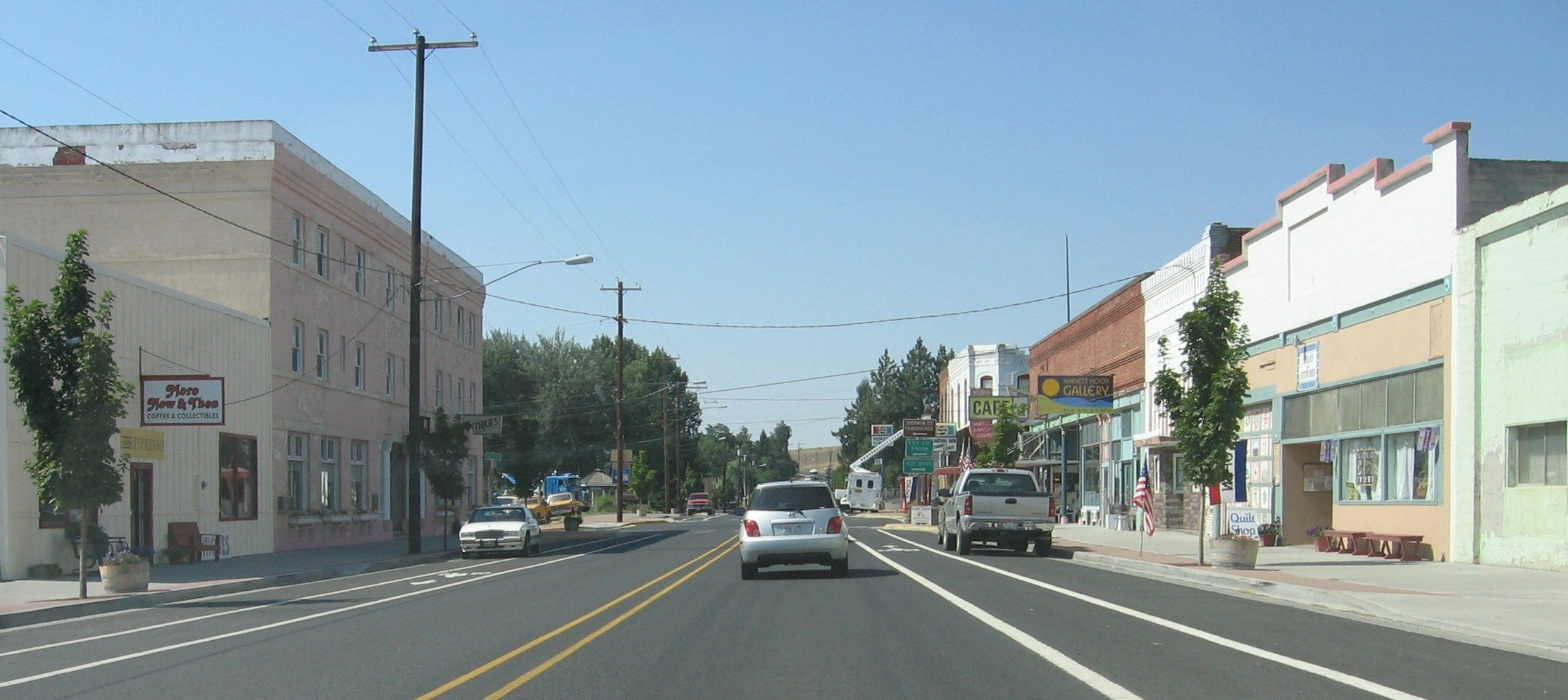
- Moro, viewed looking down U.S. Highway 97, the town's main street

- Location in Oregon
- Coordinates: 45°29′02″N 120°44′00″W
- Country: United States
- State: Oregon
- County: Sherman
- Incorporated: 1899

Government
  - Mayor: Robert Perisho

Area
  - Total: 0.49 sq mi (1.28 km^{2})
  - Land: 0.49 sq mi (1.28 km^{2})
  - Water: 0 sq mi (0.00 km^{2})
- Elevation: 1,850 ft (560 m)

Population (2020)
  - Total: 367
  - Density: 739.9/sq mi (285.69/km^{2})
- Time zone: UTC−8 (Pacific)
  - Summer (DST): UTC−7 (Pacific)
- ZIP code: 97039
- Area code: 541
- FIPS code: 41-50000
- GNIS feature ID: 2411166
- Website: www.cityofmoro.net

Moro is a city in Sherman County, Oregon, United States. As of the 2020 census, Moro had a population of 367. It is the county seat of Sherman County. It’s currently the least-populous county seat in Oregon. Moro was incorporated on February 17, 1899, by the Oregon Legislative Assembly. It was named for Moro, Illinois.

== Geography and climate ==
According to the United States Census Bureau, the city has a total area of 0.49 square miles (1.27 km^{2}), all of it land.

Moro has a Mediterranean climate (Köppen Csb) with hot, dry summers with cool mornings, and chilly, wetter winters. During the summer, afternoons are very warm to hot and generally very clear: the median rainfall is only 0.11 inches or 2.8 millimeters in August and 0.13 inches or 3.3 millimeters in July, and more than one-fifth of months in this period have no more than a trace of rain. Between June 15 and September 18 of 1932 there were ninety-six days without even a trace of rainfall. Temperatures will reach 90 °F or 32.2 °C on an average of twenty afternoons, though 100 °F or 37.8 °C can be expected only twice each year. The hottest temperature on record has been 111 °F (43.9 °C) on July 27 of 1939. Summer mornings are comfortable: as early as August 29, 1980 temperatures of 31 °F (−0.6 °C) were reported. Winters are cold if not usually severe: maxima top freezing on all but twenty afternoons and only two mornings each winter will fall to or below 0 °F or −17.8 °C, with the coldest temperature being −22 °F (−30 °C) on January 26 and 27 of 1957, and the coldest maximum temperature −7 °F (−21.7 °C) on December 31, 1968. By the middle of spring afternoon temperatures are typically extremely pleasant at around 60 °F or 16 °C, but mornings remain chilly well into spring and the last freeze can be expected around May 7.

Precipitation is very low due to the rain shadow of the Cascades and the valley location, being around 4 inches or 100 millimetres lower than even the driest areas in the Olympic rain shadow like Sequim. The wettest month on record has been December 1964 with 6.11 inches (155.2 mm), but no other month has passed 5 inches or 127.0 millimeters. The wettest "rain year" has been from July 1947 to June 1948 with 17.51 inches (444.8 mm) and the driest from July 1967 to June 1968 with 5.49 inches (139.4 mm), whilst he most precipitation in one day has been 1.67 inches (42.4 mm) on January 9, 1953.

Snowfall averages 17 inches or 0.43 meters, but varies greatly between years: in January 1950 54.4 inches or 1.4 meters fell and led to a total of 65 inches (1.7 m) for the full season, but in many years there is little snow – there was only a trace of snowfall between July 1957 and June 1958, only 2.6 inches (0.066 m) between July 2002 and June 2003, and 3.0 inches (0.076 m) between July 1976 and June 1977.

Climate data for Moro, Oregon (1991–2020 normals, extremes 1898, 1917–present)
Month	Jan	Feb	Mar	Apr	May	Jun	Jul	Aug	Sep	Oct	Nov	Dec	Year
Record high °F (°C)	68 (20)	68 (20)	75 (24)	89 (32)	100 (38)	113 (45)	111 (44)	110 (43)	100 (38)	88 (31)	72 (22)	65 (18)	113 (45)
Mean daily maximum °F (°C)	40.1 (4.5)	44.9 (7.2)	52.3 (11.3)	58.8 (14.9)	67.4 (19.7)	74.3 (23.5)	84.0 (28.9)	83.8 (28.8)	75.8 (24.3)	62.2 (16.8)	48.4 (9.1)	39.5 (4.2)	61.0 (16.1)
Daily mean °F (°C)	32.3 (0.2)	35.5 (1.9)	41.2 (5.1)	46.7 (8.2)	54.5 (12.5)	60.7 (15.9)	68.5 (20.3)	68.2 (20.1)	60.6 (15.9)	49.2 (9.6)	38.5 (3.6)	31.8 (−0.1)	49.0 (9.4)
Mean daily minimum °F (°C)	24.5 (−4.2)	26.2 (−3.2)	30.1 (−1.1)	34.5 (1.4)	41.6 (5.3)	47.0 (8.3)	53.0 (11.7)	52.6 (11.4)	45.4 (7.4)	36.2 (2.3)	28.7 (−1.8)	24.2 (−4.3)	37.0 (2.8)
Record low °F (°C)	−22 (−30)	−15 (−26)	1 (−17)	18 (−8)	18 (−8)	27 (−3)	34 (1)	31 (−1)	21 (−6)	7 (−14)	−9 (−23)	−20 (−29)	−22 (−30)
Average precipitation inches (mm)	1.47 (37)	1.06 (27)	0.97 (25)	0.96 (24)	0.96 (24)	0.57 (14)	0.18 (4.6)	0.20 (5.1)	0.43 (11)	1.06 (27)	1.54 (39)	1.61 (41)	11.01 (280)
Average snowfall inches (cm)	5.3 (13)	2.5 (6.4)	0.7 (1.8)	0.0 (0.0)	0.0 (0.0)	0.0 (0.0)	0.0 (0.0)	0.0 (0.0)	0.0 (0.0)	0.2 (0.51)	2.2 (5.6)	5.7 (14)	16.6 (42)
Average precipitation days (≥ 0.01 in)	11.1	8.9	9.5	9.2	7.5	4.8	1.8	1.7	2.9	8.3	11.6	12.2	89.5
Average snowy days (≥ 0.1 in)	3.8	1.7	0.6	0.0	0.0	0.0	0.0	0.0	0.0	0.0	1.0	3.5	10.6
Source: NOAA

== Demographics ==
Historical population
Census	Pop.	Note	%±
1900	335		—
1910	378		12.8%
1920	418		10.6%
1930	352		−15.8%
1940	309		−12.2%
1950	359		16.2%
1960	327		−8.9%
1970	290		−11.3%
1980	336		15.9%
1990	292		−13.1%
2000	337		15.4%
2010	324		−3.9%
2020	367		13.3%
U.S. Decennial Census

=== 2020 census ===
As of the 2020 census, Moro had a population of 367. The median age was 43.3 years. 24.3% of residents were under the age of 18 and 22.1% of residents were 65 years of age or older. For every 100 females there were 94.2 males, and for every 100 females age 18 and over there were 100.0 males age 18 and over.

0% of residents lived in urban areas, while 100.0% lived in rural areas.

There were 162 households in Moro, of which 26.5% had children under the age of 18 living in them. Of all households, 46.3% were married-couple households, 21.0% were households with a male householder and no spouse or partner present, and 24.7% were households with a female householder and no spouse or partner present. About 32.7% of all households were made up of individuals and 21.0% had someone living alone who was 65 years of age or older.

There were 179 housing units, of which 9.5% were vacant. Among occupied housing units, 59.3% were owner-occupied and 40.7% were renter-occupied. The homeowner vacancy rate was 4.0% and the rental vacancy rate was 14.3%.

Racial composition as of the 2020 census
Race	Number	Percent
White	326	88.8%
Black or African American	0	0%
American Indian and Alaska Native	6	1.6%
Asian	1	0.3%
Native Hawaiian and Other Pacific Islander	0	0%
Some other race	1	0.3%
Two or more races	33	9.0%
Hispanic or Latino (of any race)	13	3.5%

=== 2010 census ===
As of the census of 2010, there were 324 people, 149 households, and 86 families residing in the city. The population density was 661.2 inhabitants per square mile (255.3/km^{2}). There were 163 housing units at an average density of 332.7 per square mile (128.5/km^{2}). The racial makeup of the city was 92.6% White, 3.1% Native American, 2.8% from other races, and 1.5% from two or more races. Hispanic or Latino people of any race were 4.0% of the population.

There were 149 households, of which 21.5% had children under the age of 18 living with them, 47.7% were married couples living together, 8.1% had a female householder with no husband present, 2.0% had a male householder with no wife present, and 42.3% were non-families. 36.2% of all households were made up of individuals, and 18.2% had someone living alone who was 65 years of age or older. The average household size was 2.17 and the average family size was 2.85.

The median age in the city was 48.1 years. 19.4% of residents were under the age of 18; 7.1% were between the ages of 18 and 24; 17.7% were from 25 to 44; 30.3% were from 45 to 64; and 25.6% were 65 years of age or older. The gender makeup of the city was 47.2% male and 52.8% female.

=== 2000 census ===
As of the census of 2000, there were 337 people, 133 households, and 94 families residing in the city. The population density was 696.4 inhabitants per square mile (268.9/km^{2}). There were 150 housing units at an average density of 310.0 per square mile (119.7/km^{2}). The racial makeup of the city was 92.58% White, 1.19% African American, 1.19% Native American, 0.30% Asian, 3.26% from other races, and 1.48% from two or more races. Hispanic or Latino people of any race were 5.34% of the population.

There were 133 households, out of which 35.3% had children under the age of 18 living with them, 52.6% were married couples living together, 15.0% had a female householder with no husband present, and 29.3% were non-families. 27.1% of all households were made up of individuals, and 16.5% had someone living alone who was 65 years of age or older. The average household size was 2.53 and the average family size was 3.10.

In the city, the population was spread out, with 30.9% under the age of 18, 6.5% from 18 to 24, 22.3% from 25 to 44, 23.1% from 45 to 64, and 17.2% who were 65 years of age or older. The median age was 40 years. For every 100 females, there were 97.1 males. For every 100 females age 18 and over, there were 94.2 males.

The median income for a household in the city was $35,625, and the median income for a family was $40,625. Males had a median income of $35,313 versus $15,417 for females. The per capita income for the city was $14,887. About 14.7% of families and 16.8% of the population were below the poverty line, including 19.0% of those under age 18 and 9.8% of those age 65 or over.
