= Grass Valley, Oregon =

City in Sherman County, Oregon, U.S.

- City
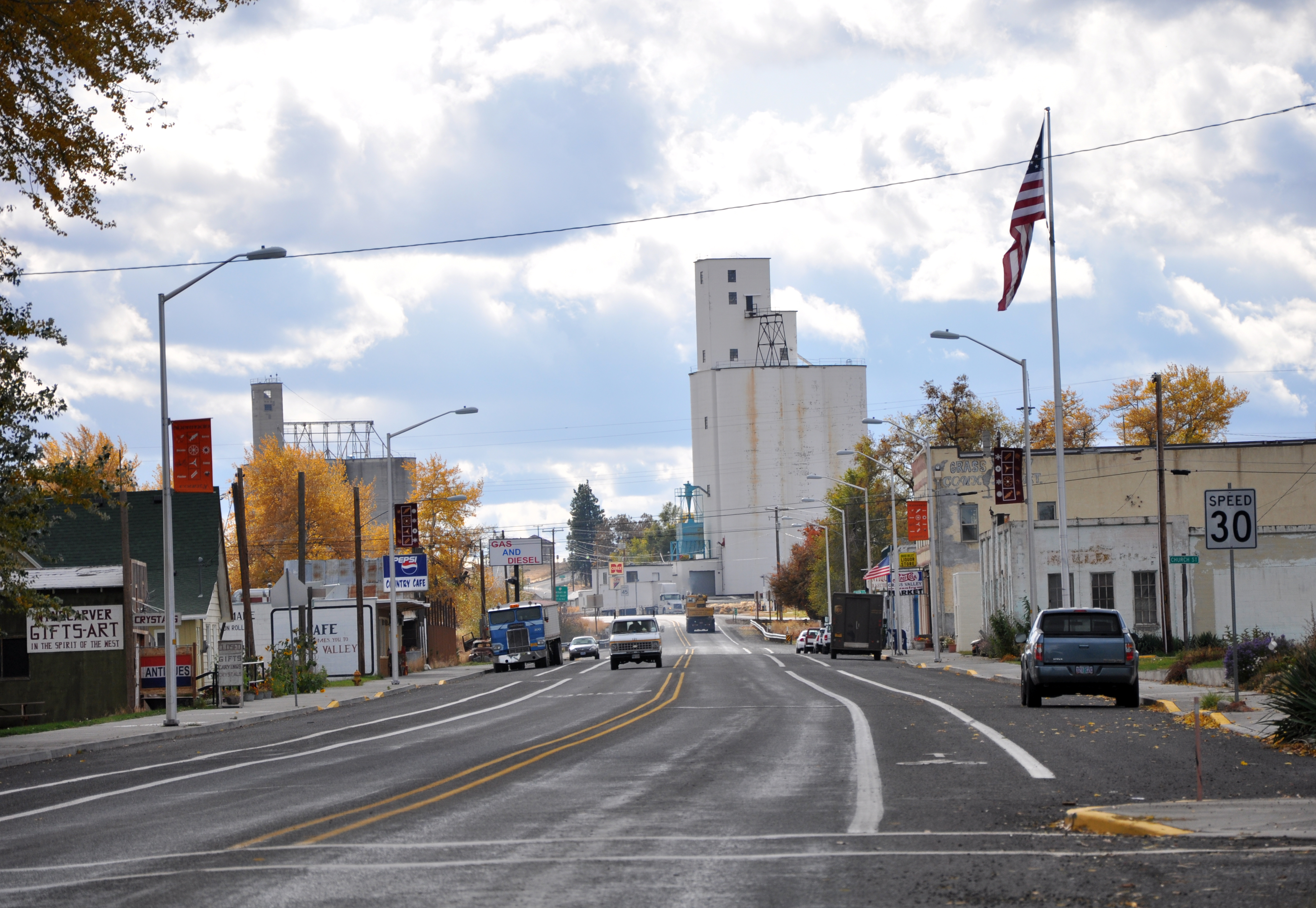
- Looking south along Mill Street (U.S. Route 97)

- Location in Oregon
- Coordinates: 45°21′33″N 120°47′03″W
- Country: United States
- State: Oregon
- County: Sherman
- Incorporated: 1901

Government
  - Mayor: Meinrad Kuettel

Area
  - Total: 0.51 sq mi (1.32 km^{2})
  - Land: 0.51 sq mi (1.32 km^{2})
  - Water: 0 sq mi (0.00 km^{2})
- Elevation: 2,267 ft (691 m)

Population (2020)
  - Total: 149
  - Density: 291.4/sq mi (112.51/km^{2})
- Time zone: UTC-8 (Pacific)
  - Summer (DST): UTC-7 (Pacific)
- ZIP code: 97029
- Area code: 541
- FIPS code: 41-30650
- GNIS feature ID: 2410652
- Website: www.grassvalleyoregon.com

Grass Valley is a city in Sherman County, Oregon, United States. As of the 2020 census, Grass Valley had a population of 149.

== Geography ==
According to the United States Census Bureau, the city has a total area of 0.51 square miles (1.32 km^{2}), all of it land.

== Demographics ==
Historical population
Census	Pop.	Note	%±
1910	342		—
1920	317		−7.3%
1930	208		−34.4%
1940	204		−1.9%
1950	195		−4.4%
1960	234		20.0%
1970	153		−34.6%
1980	164		7.2%
1990	160		−2.4%
2000	171		6.9%
2010	164		−4.1%
2020	149		−9.1%
U.S. Decennial Census

=== 2020 census ===
As of the 2020 census, Grass Valley had a population of 149. The median age was 44.8 years. 18.8% of residents were under the age of 18 and 24.8% of residents were 65 years of age or older. For every 100 females there were 129.2 males, and for every 100 females age 18 and over there were 124.1 males age 18 and over.

0% of residents lived in urban areas, while 100.0% lived in rural areas.

There were 71 households in Grass Valley, of which 26.8% had children under the age of 18 living in them. Of all households, 35.2% were married-couple households, 33.8% were households with a male householder and no spouse or partner present, and 23.9% were households with a female householder and no spouse or partner present. About 39.4% of all households were made up of individuals and 21.1% had someone living alone who was 65 years of age or older.

There were 80 housing units, of which 11.2% were vacant. Among occupied housing units, 76.1% were owner-occupied and 23.9% were renter-occupied. The homeowner vacancy rate was <0.1% and the rental vacancy rate was <0.1%.

Racial composition as of the 2020 census
Race	Number	Percent
White	129	86.6%
Black or African American	0	0%
American Indian and Alaska Native	1	0.7%
Asian	0	0%
Native Hawaiian and Other Pacific Islander	0	0%
Some other race	0	0%
Two or more races	19	12.8%
Hispanic or Latino (of any race)	7	4.7%

=== 2010 census ===
As of the census of 2010, there were 164 people, 74 households, and 47 families living in the city. The population density was 321.6 inhabitants per square mile (124.2/km^{2}). There were 92 housing units at an average density of 180.4 per square mile (69.7/km^{2}). The racial makeup of the city was 97.0% White, 0.6% Native American, 0.6% from other races, and 1.8% from two or more races. Hispanic or Latino of any race were 3.0% of the population.

There were 74 households, of which 23.0% had children under the age of 18 living with them, 47.3% were married couples living together, 14.9% had a female householder with no husband present, 1.4% had a male householder with no wife present, and 36.5% were non-families. 29.7% of all households were made up of individuals, and 20.3% had someone living alone who was 65 years of age or older. The average household size was 2.22 and the average family size was 2.74.

The median age in the city was 52 years. 21.3% of residents were under the age of 18; 2.4% were between the ages of 18 and 24; 18.2% were from 25 to 44; 29.3% were from 45 to 64; and 28.7% were 65 years of age or older. The gender makeup of the city was 45.7% male and 54.3% female.

=== 2000 census ===
As of the census of 2000, there were 171 people, 75 households, and 47 families living in the city. The population density was 335.3 inhabitants per square mile (129.5/km^{2}). There were 93 housing units at an average density of 175.9 per square mile (67.9/km^{2}). The racial makeup of the city was 95.32% White, 2.34% Native American, 1.17% Asian, and 1.17% from two or more races. Hispanic or Latino of any race were 3.51% of the population.

There were 75 households, out of which 26.7% had children under the age of 18 living with them, 49.3% were married couples living together, 12.0% had a female householder with no husband present, and 37.3% were non-families. 34.7% of all households were made up of individuals, and 22.7% had someone living alone who was 65 years of age or older. The average household size was 2.28 and the average family size was 2.96.

In the city, the population was spread out, with 24.0% under the age of 18, 5.8% from 18 to 24, 22.2% from 25 to 44, 21.6% from 45 to 64, and 26.3% who were 65 years of age or older. The median age was 44 years. For every 100 females, there were 87.9 males. For every 100 females age 18 and over, there were 80.6 males.

The median income for a household in the city was $25,417, and the median income for a family was $31,250. Males had a median income of $41,250 versus $30,417 for females. The per capita income for the city was $13,843. About 6.0% of families and 13.6% of the population were below the poverty line, including 31.0% of those under the age of eighteen and 9.5% of those 65 or over.

== Points of interest ==
Oregon Raceway Park is a 2.3-mile dedicated road course facility just east of the town that hosts competitive automobile, kart and motorcycle events.
