= Wasco, Oregon =

- City
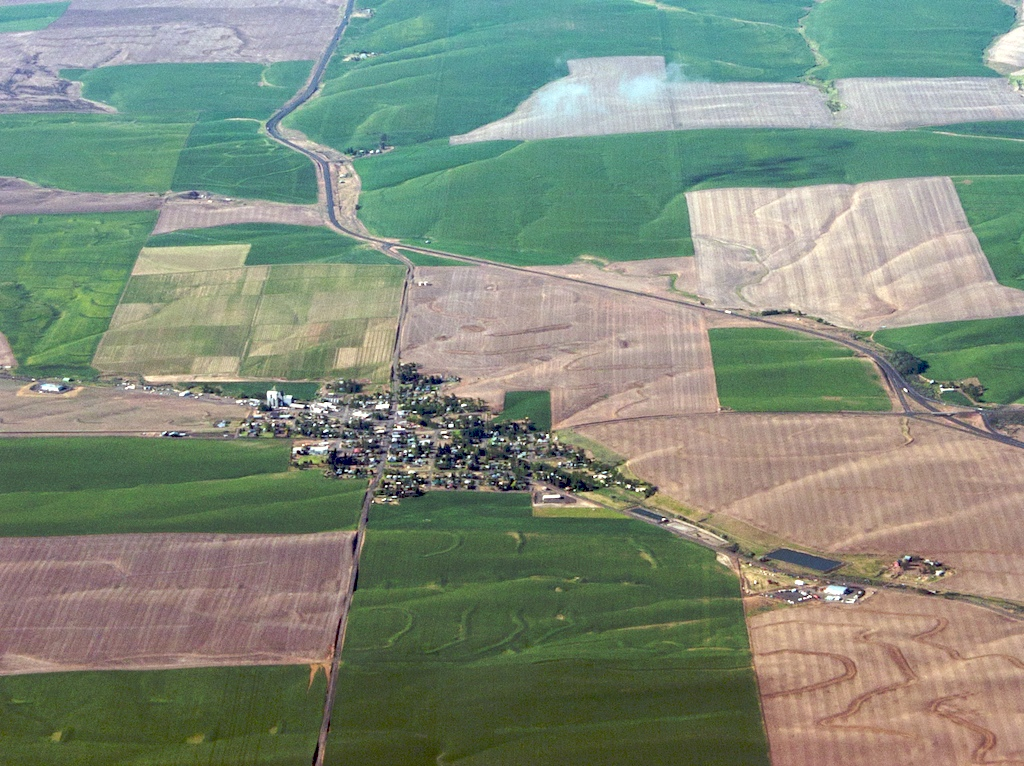
- Aerial view of Wasco

- Location in Oregon
- Coordinates: 45°35′30″N 120°41′51″W
- Country: United States
- State: Oregon
- County: Sherman
- Incorporated: 1898

Government
  - Type: City Council

Area
  - Total: 1.01 sq mi (2.61 km^{2})
  - Land: 1.01 sq mi (2.61 km^{2})
  - Water: 0 sq mi (0.00 km^{2})
- Elevation: 1,283 ft (391 m)

Population (2020)
  - Total: 417
  - Density: 413.7/sq mi (159.73/km^{2})
- Time zone: UTC-8 (Pacific)
  - Summer (DST): UTC-7 (Pacific)
- ZIP code: 97065
- Area code: 541
- FIPS code: 41-78950
- GNIS feature ID: 2412186
- Website: www.wascooregon.com

Wasco is a city in Sherman County, Oregon, United States. The population was 417 at the 2020 census.

== Geography ==
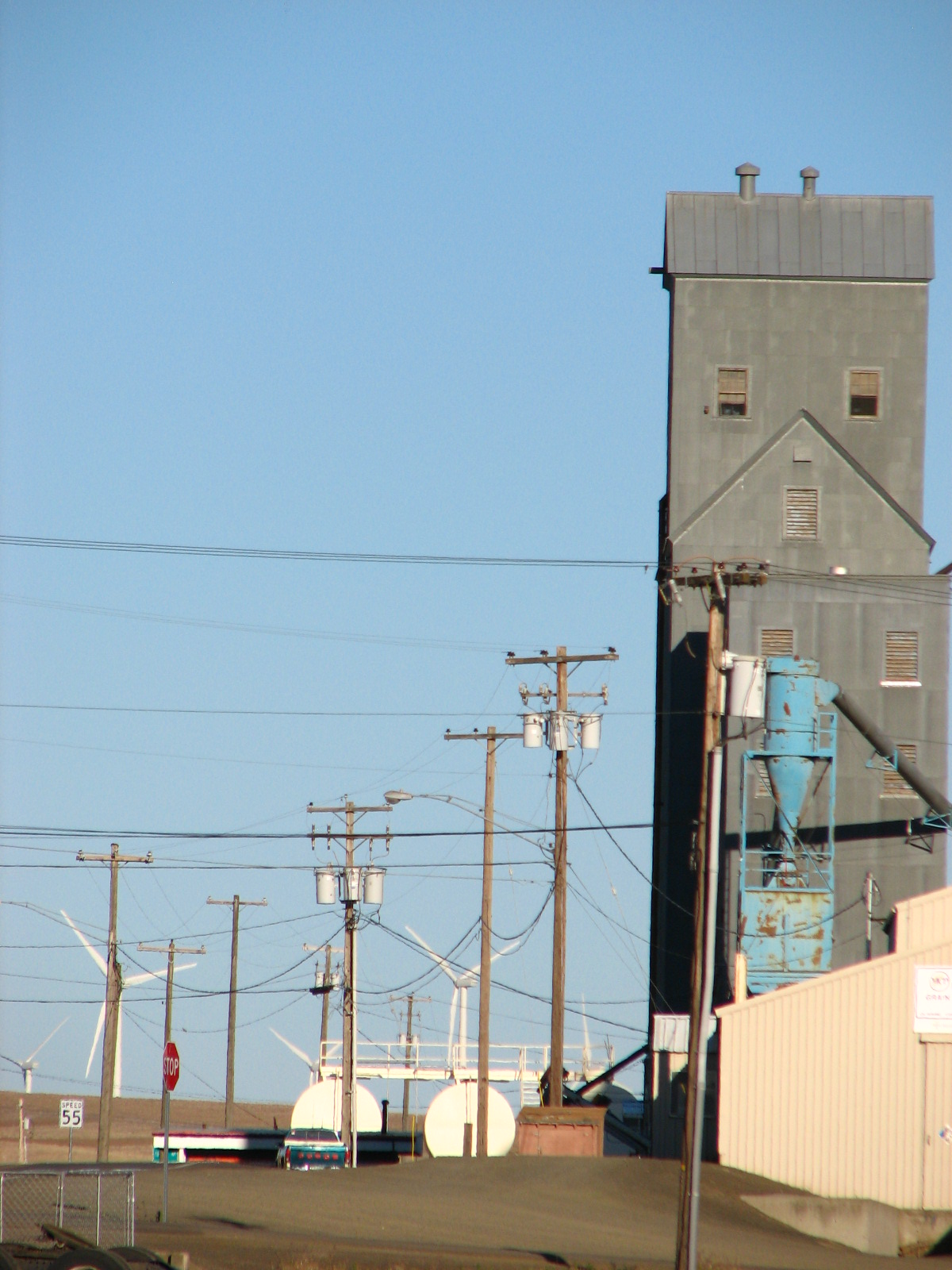
The agricultural and wind power industries are prominent around Wasco.

According to the United States Census Bureau, the city has a total area of 1.00 square mile (2.59 km^{2}), all land.

Wascoite or Biggs jasper, a type of white clay-based mineral found near Biggs Junction, is locally named for Wasco.

== Climate ==
This region experiences warm (but not hot) and dry summers, with no average monthly temperatures above 71.6 °F. According to the Köppen Climate Classification system, Wasco has a warm-summer Mediterranean climate, abbreviated "Csb" on climate maps.

Climate data for Wasco
Month	Jan	Feb	Mar	Apr	May	Jun	Jul	Aug	Sep	Oct	Nov	Dec	Year
Record high °F (°C)	63 (17)	71 (22)	79 (26)	91 (33)	100 (38)	105 (41)	113 (45)	105 (41)	101 (38)	87 (31)	76 (24)	65 (18)	113 (45)
Mean daily maximum °F (°C)	37.1 (2.8)	43.3 (6.3)	53.8 (12.1)	62.6 (17.0)	70.3 (21.3)	76.8 (24.9)	86.4 (30.2)	85 (29)	75.9 (24.4)	64 (18)	48.2 (9.0)	40.4 (4.7)	62 (17)
Mean daily minimum °F (°C)	24.2 (−4.3)	28.3 (−2.1)	33.4 (0.8)	37.4 (3.0)	42.8 (6.0)	49.1 (9.5)	54.6 (12.6)	53.7 (12.1)	47.1 (8.4)	39.7 (4.3)	32.2 (0.1)	28 (−2)	39.2 (4.0)
Record low °F (°C)	−20 (−29)	−21 (−29)	14 (−10)	18 (−8)	12 (−11)	32 (0)	33 (1)	37 (3)	25 (−4)	11 (−12)	6 (−14)	−28 (−33)	−28 (−33)
Average precipitation inches (mm)	1.84 (47)	1.22 (31)	0.97 (25)	0.75 (19)	0.71 (18)	0.62 (16)	0.21 (5.3)	0.29 (7.4)	0.54 (14)	0.96 (24)	1.73 (44)	1.87 (47)	11.7 (300)
Average snowfall inches (cm)	6.2 (16)	2.9 (7.4)	0.8 (2.0)	0 (0)	0 (0)	0 (0)	0 (0)	0 (0)	0 (0)	0.1 (0.25)	1.4 (3.6)	3.8 (9.7)	15.1 (38)
Average precipitation days	10	9	8	6	5	4	2	2	4	6	10	10	76

== Demographics ==
Historical population
Census	Pop.	Note	%±
1900	322		—
1910	386		19.9%
1920	701		81.6%
1930	400		−42.9%
1940	303		−24.2%
1950	305		0.7%
1960	348		14.1%
1970	412		18.4%
1980	415		0.7%
1990	374		−9.9%
2000	381		1.9%
2010	410		7.6%
2020	417		1.7%
U.S. Decennial Census

=== 2020 census ===
As of the 2020 census, Wasco had a population of 417. The median age was 51.1 years. 16.1% of residents were under the age of 18 and 32.9% of residents were 65 years of age or older. For every 100 females there were 102.4 males, and for every 100 females age 18 and over there were 102.3 males age 18 and over.

0% of residents lived in urban areas, while 100.0% lived in rural areas.

There were 182 households in Wasco, of which 23.6% had children under the age of 18 living in them. Of all households, 42.3% were married-couple households, 28.0% were households with a male householder and no spouse or partner present, and 24.2% were households with a female householder and no spouse or partner present. About 32.4% of all households were made up of individuals and 19.2% had someone living alone who was 65 years of age or older.

There were 204 housing units, of which 10.8% were vacant. Among occupied housing units, 74.2% were owner-occupied and 25.8% were renter-occupied. The homeowner vacancy rate was 2.2% and the rental vacancy rate was 5.9%.

Racial composition as of the 2020 census
Race	Number	Percent
White	355	85.1%
Black or African American	0	0%
American Indian and Alaska Native	7	1.7%
Asian	3	0.7%
Native Hawaiian and Other Pacific Islander	2	0.5%
Some other race	10	2.4%
Two or more races	40	9.6%
Hispanic or Latino (of any race)	32	7.7%

=== 2010 census ===
As of the census of 2010, there were 410 people, 182 households, and 111 families living in the city. The population density was 410.0 inhabitants per square mile (158.3/km^{2}). There were 208 housing units at an average density of 208.0 per square mile (80.3/km^{2}). The racial makeup of the city was 95.6% White, 0.5% African American, 0.7% Native American, 0.2% Asian, 0.2% Pacific Islander, 1.5% from other races, and 1.2% from two or more races. Hispanic or Latino people of any race were 2.0% of the population.

There were 182 households, of which 20.3% had children under the age of 18 living with them, 49.5% were married couples living together, 8.2% had a female householder with no husband present, 3.3% had a male householder with no wife present, and 39.0% were non-families. 31.3% of all households were made up of individuals, and 13.1% had someone living alone who was 65 years of age or older. The average household size was 2.25 and the average family size was 2.80.

The median age in the city was 50.2 years. 18% of residents were under the age of 18; 7.9% were between the ages of 18 and 24; 18.3% were from 25 to 44; 31.9% were from 45 to 64; and 23.9% were 65 years of age or older. The gender makeup of the city was 51.5% male and 48.5% female.

=== 2000 census ===
As of the census of 2000, there were 381 people, 168 households, and 110 families living in the city. The population density was 394.5 inhabitants per square mile (152.3/km^{2}). There were 196 housing units at an average density of 202.9 per square mile (78.3/km^{2}). The racial makeup of the city was 94.23% White, 2.36% Native American, 0.26% Asian, 0.26% from other races, and 2.89% from two or more races. Hispanic or Latino people of any race were 3.41% of the population.

There were 168 households, out of which 25.0% had children under the age of 18 living with them, 56.5% were married couples living together, 4.8% had a female householder with no husband present, and 34.5% were non-families. 29.8% of all households were made up of individuals, and 16.1% had someone living alone who was 65 years of age or older. The average household size was 2.27 and the average family size was 2.73.

In the city, the population was spread out, with 23.1% under the age of 18, 4.2% from 18 to 24, 22.0% from 25 to 44, 28.3% from 45 to 64, and 22.3% who were 65 years of age or older. The median age was 45 years. For every 100 females, there were 101.6 males. For every 100 females age 18 and over, there were 103.5 males.

The median income for a household in the city was $35,917, and the median income for a family was $39,375. Males had a median income of $30,500 versus $21,875 for females. The per capita income for the city was $17,917. About 7.0% of families and 11.9% of the population were below the poverty line, including 16.9% of those under age 18 and 9.0% of those age 65 or over.

== Transportation ==
- Wasco State Airport
- Sherman County Transit

== History ==
On July 16, 1883, Wasco townsite was platted by Clark Dunlap; the southeast corner of southwest half of section 4, township 1, north range 17 E.W.M. The quarter located due east by Bill Armsworthy, where the cistern is located. The parcel of land where the depot is situated by W.H. Biggs and the last parcel platted on McPhereson's quarter, where the warehouses stand.

The townsite situated near the head of Spanish Hollow, was given the name Wasco (an Indian word meaning a maker of horn basins) from the name of the county in which it was located at the time it was founded. W.M. Barnett was first to build a business which was a two-story edifice, the lower portion being used for his mercantile business; the upper story used primarily for meetings of every description. Mr. Barnett closely followed by Messrs. MacKenzie and Somer, a machine shop. Mr. MacKenzie's mother was the first white woman to live in the city. These people were followed the succeeding year by Messrs. Tozier and Holland, blacksmiths. The same year, 1883, the first Methodist Episcopal Church was built.

Prior to moving to Wasco, Mr. Barnett had been engaged in mercantile business since 1880 near Eaton's ranch, one and one-half miles northwest of Wasco. A second store building was erected in town by Mr. Barnett, this was in 1885 - a drug store - rented to Josiah Marsh. In 1887 Levi Armsworthy built the Oskaloosa Hotel, the first hostelry on the original plat of the town. Later came Dr. S.E. Koontz and James Haas, a contractor. In 1888 the first school house was erected, a one-story building in commission for two years. In 1890 a four-room edifice was built costing $4,000 and in 1889, E.O.E. Webber built the second general merchandise store in Wasco. A stock company was organized in 1901 for the purpose of transacting a general banking business and the Sherman County Bank was sold to J.M. Patterson and V.C. Brook; it failed in 1899. After the 1892 national panic, the marks of melancholy resulted throughout the land. By 1897, Wasco had doubled in population, and with anticipation of Columbia Southern Railway, the first warehouse was constructed by Farmers Co-Operative Warehouse Company. It was in business two years and disposed of to the Union Warehouse Company, and in one year, it was merged with the Wasco Warehouse and Milling Company. H.P. Isaacs erected the first flouring mill in Wasco.

In January of 1898, 55 residences with a population of 300 within the city limits, petitioned and was granted permission by the county court to incorporate. After a vote of a successful majority in favor, on January 31, 1898, George N. Crosfield was elected the first mayor. For councilmen - L. Clark, J. McPherson, W. Booth, P. Kretzer, W. Murchie, and W. Reynolds. For recorder - W.F. Johnson and W.H. Walker for marshal, and V.C. Brock as treasurer.

In 1903, Wasco suffered a disastrous fire starting in the Oregon Trading Company's store. Destroying not only this building, the fire ran to the adjacent opera house, which was a total loss, as was the residence of John Venable. The Oregon Trading Company's store (the property of E.O. McCoy and George N. Crosfield) was valued at $100,000, the opera house, $40,000, and the Venable residence, $1,500. This moved the citizens of Wasco to vote for a fire protection system and sewerage system at the same time.

When Wasco was settled, it was part of four different parcels of land. If you drive through the main street coming down the steep hill from the south, you will notice the main street is not straight with the section line. It was told, when the state highway was to come through the town, one party objected and refused to give a right-of-way, therefore the other three parties gave more than their share. This is why the street is jogged.

== Notable people ==
- Gladys Stone Wright (1925–2025), American band director, was born in Wasco.
