= List of ghost towns in Oregon =

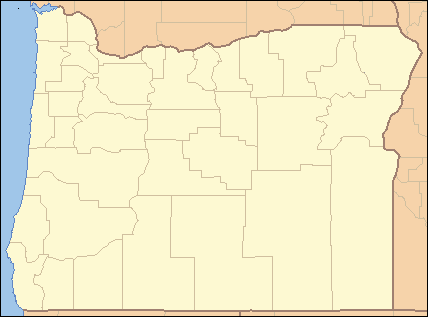

According to several historians, the U.S. state of Oregon contains over 200 ghost towns. Professor and historian Stephen Arndt has counted a total of 256 ghost towns in the state, some well known, others "really obscure." The high number of ghost towns and former communities in the state is largely due to its frontier history and the influx of pioneers who emerged in the area during the 19th century. Many of the ghost towns in Oregon were once mining or lumber camps that were abandoned after their respective industries became unprosperous.

This list includes towns and communities that have been described as ghost towns, and may be abandoned, unpopulated, or have populations that have declined to significantly small numbers; (Note: According to T. Lindsay Baker, a "ghost town" can refer to either an unpopulated town or a town that, though still populated (albeit in small numbers), has seen a significant decline in population since its establishment.) some may still be classified as unincorporated communities. As of 2019, some of the towns included may have small residual populations; others may retain few physical remnants of their existence, but are broadly considered ghost towns under prevailing definitions in the United States. (Note: American author Lambert Florin's preferred definition of a ghost town is simply "a shadowy semblance of a former self," while historian T. Lindsey Baker defines a ghost town as simply "a town for which the reason for being no longer exists." Based on the definitions, Sherman County has the most ghost towns with 14 while Klamath County has the fewest with zero.)

== Classifications ==
Many historians and enthusiasts of ghost towns use a classification system to distinguish ghost towns by types. This classification, which breaks towns into numerous different types, was established by photographer Gary Speck, and has been adapted here.

Class	Distinguishing features
A	No apparent remains of former settlement exist. In some cases, site may be marked and/or contain a cemetery.
B	Dilapidated buildings and/or remnants of buildings present, along with rubble and debris.
C	No population, but structures are still mostly intact; may be actively preserved by a caretaker.
D	Area is sparsely populated and may boast period structures (of varied physical condition) and/or a cemetery, but no operative town proper.
E	Has retained a small population and historic structures, though typically not as substantive as in its heyday.
F	Not a stand-alone classification, but an addition to any of the above. It usually designates a restored town, state park, or indicates some other “additional” status.

== Towns ==
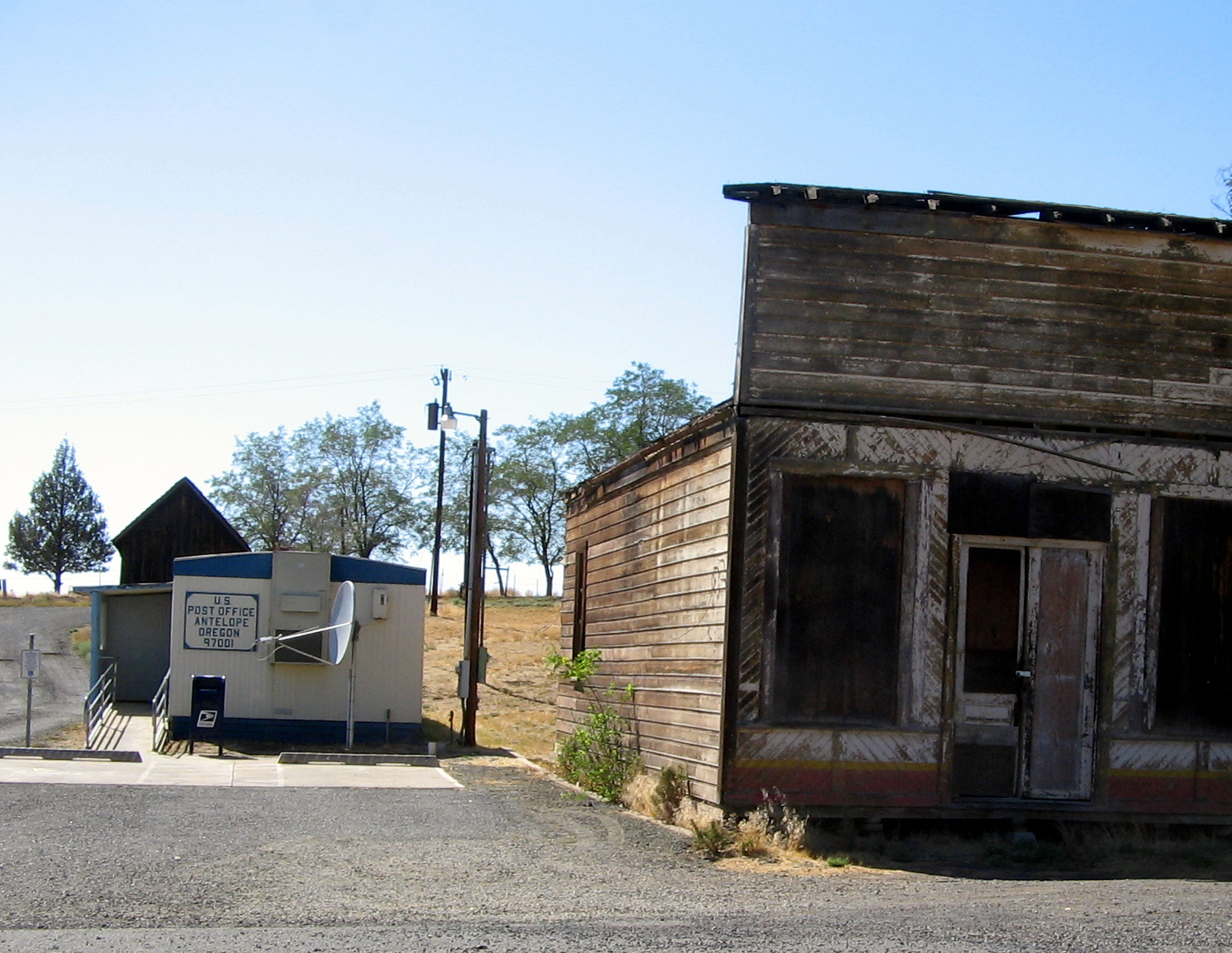
Antelope, 2009

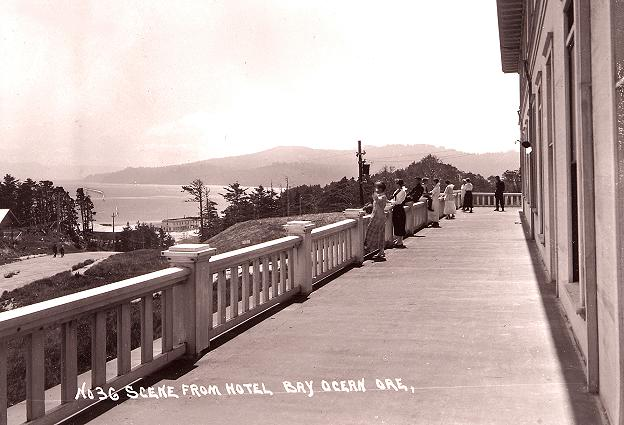
Bayocean, c. 1911

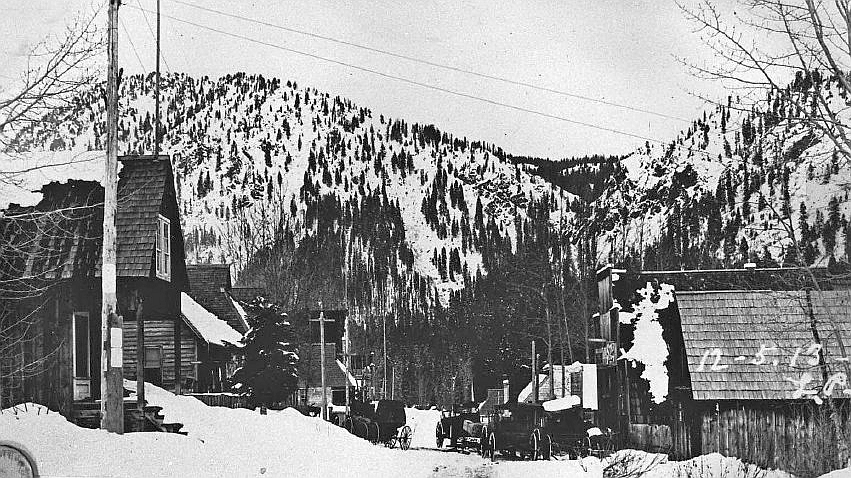
Cornucopia, 1913

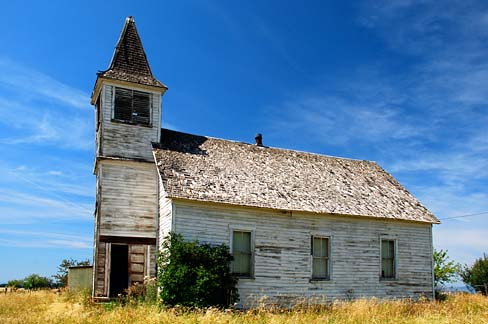
Flora, 2009

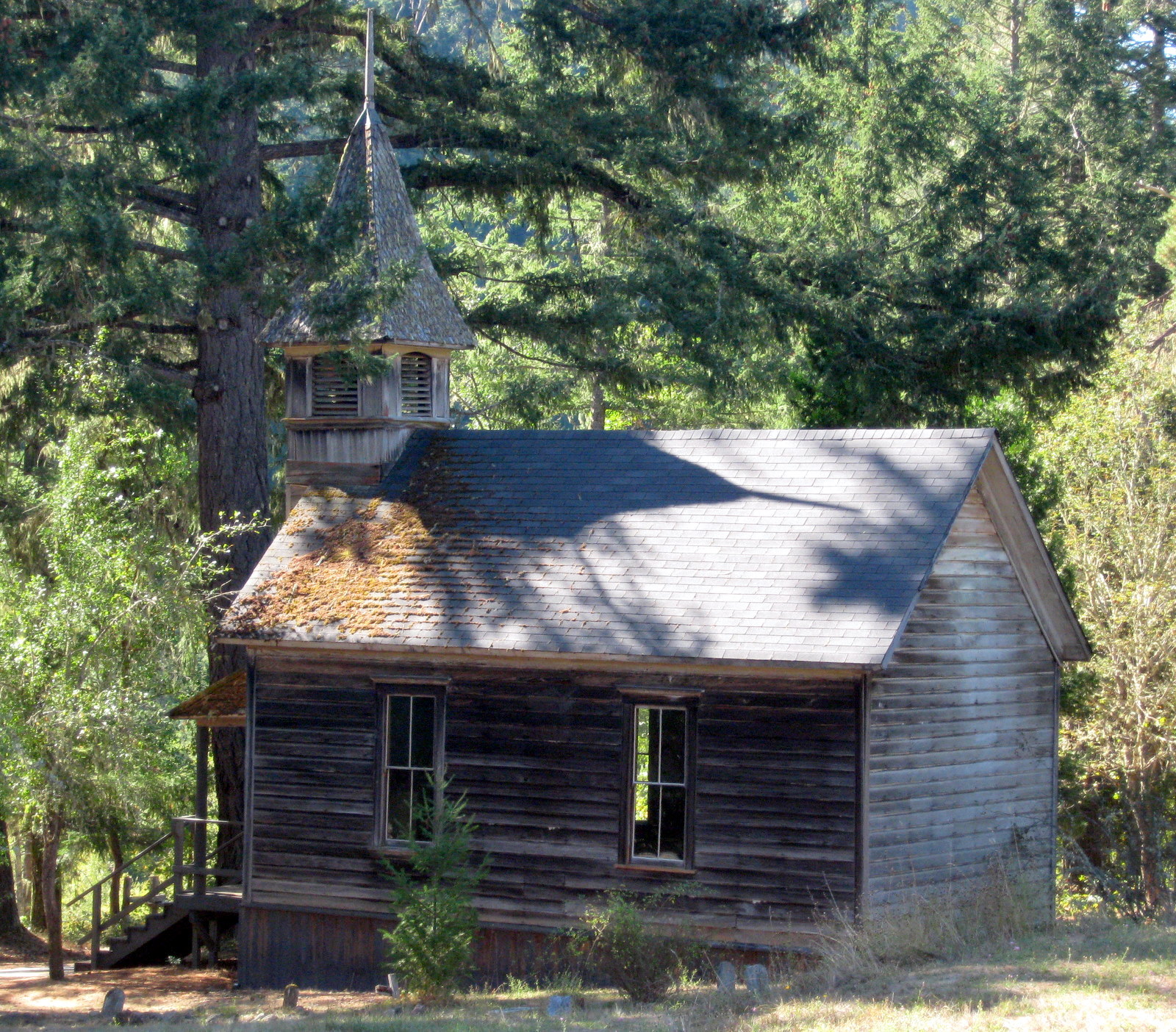
Golden, 2009

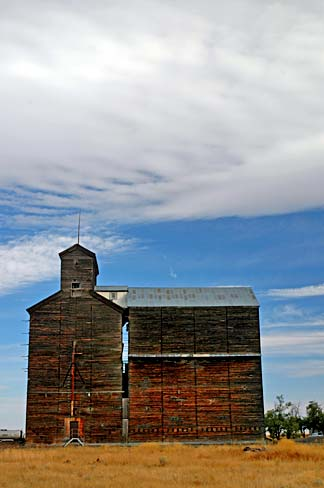
Kent, 2006

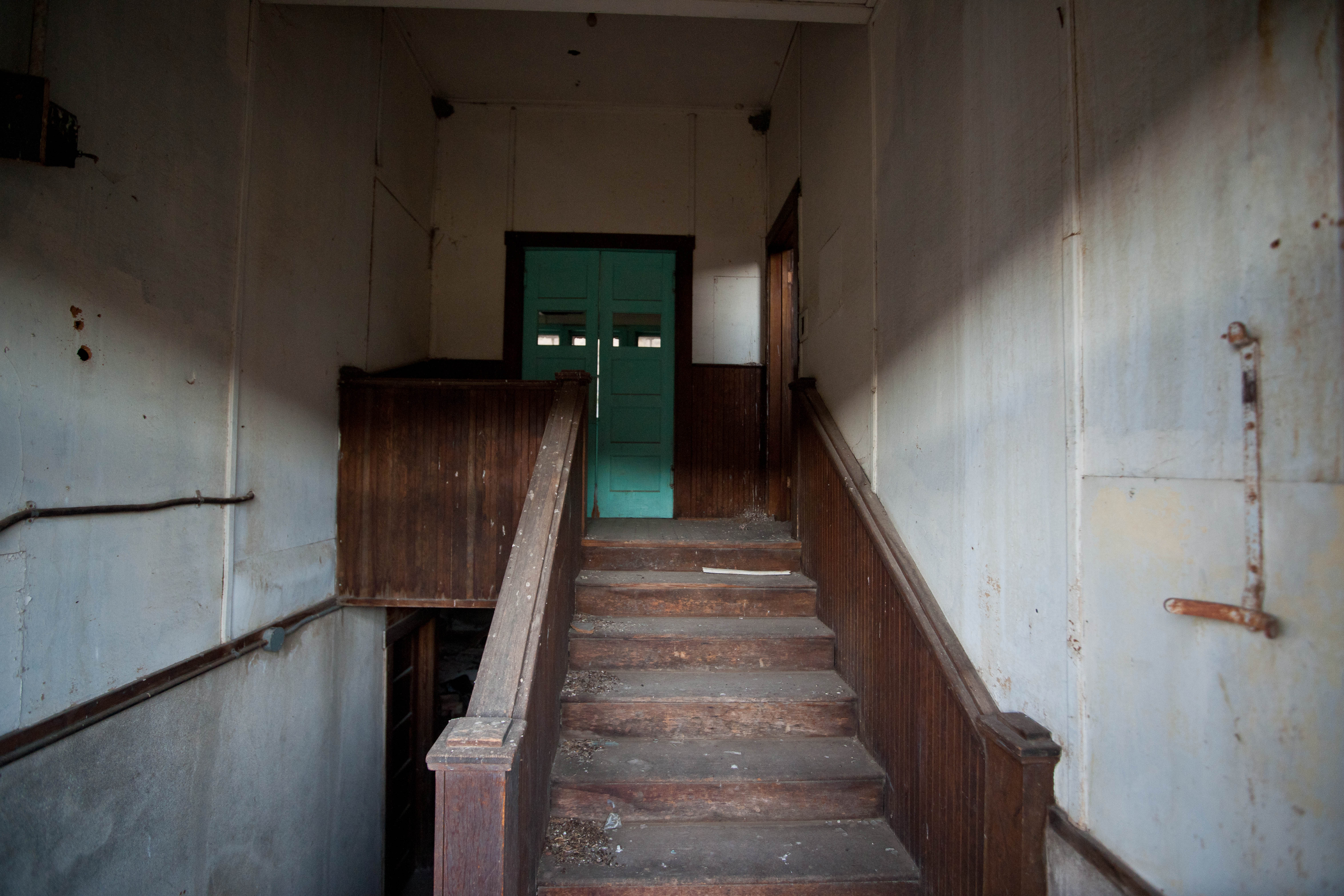
Lime building interior, 2012

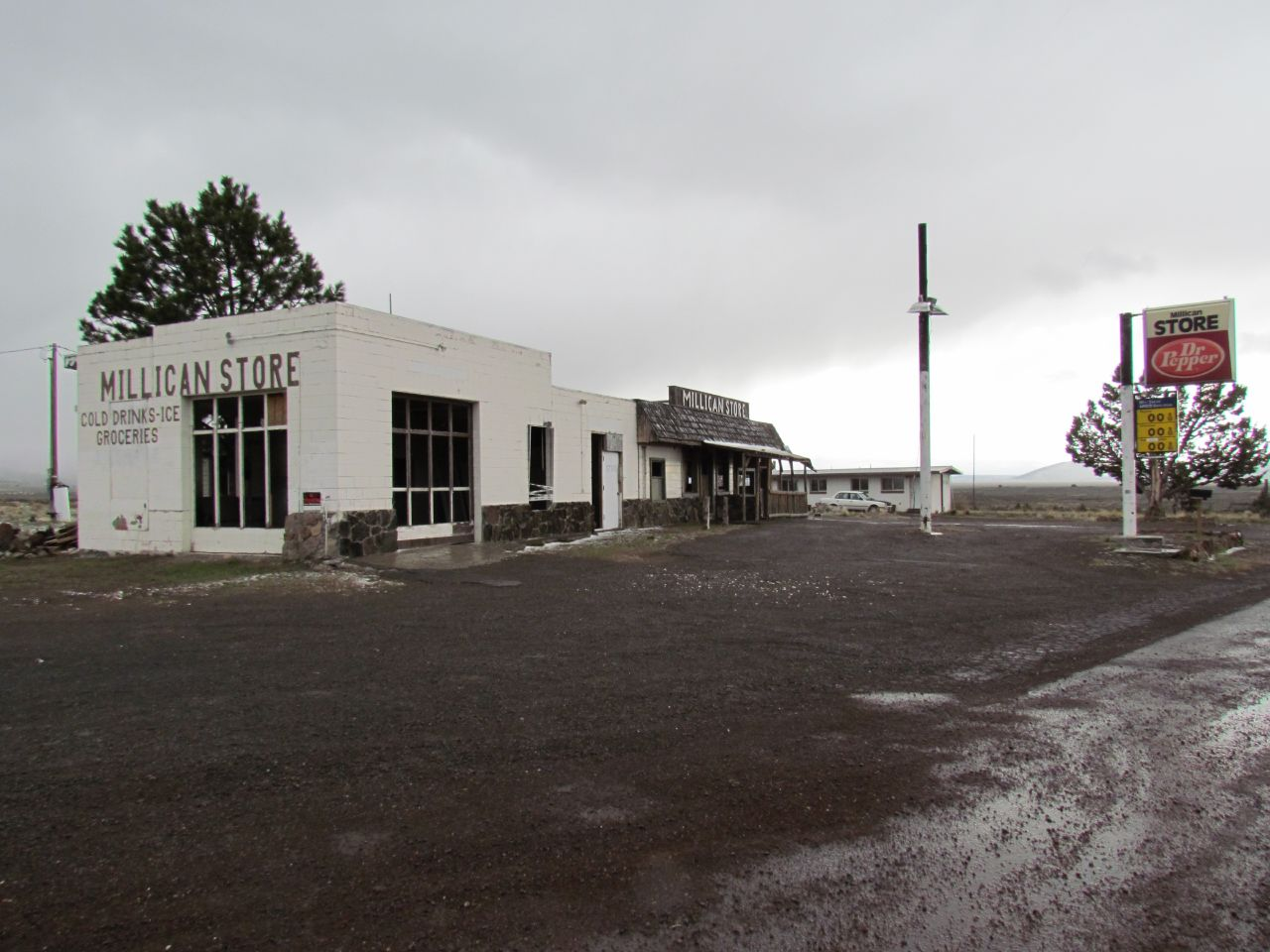
Millican, 2011

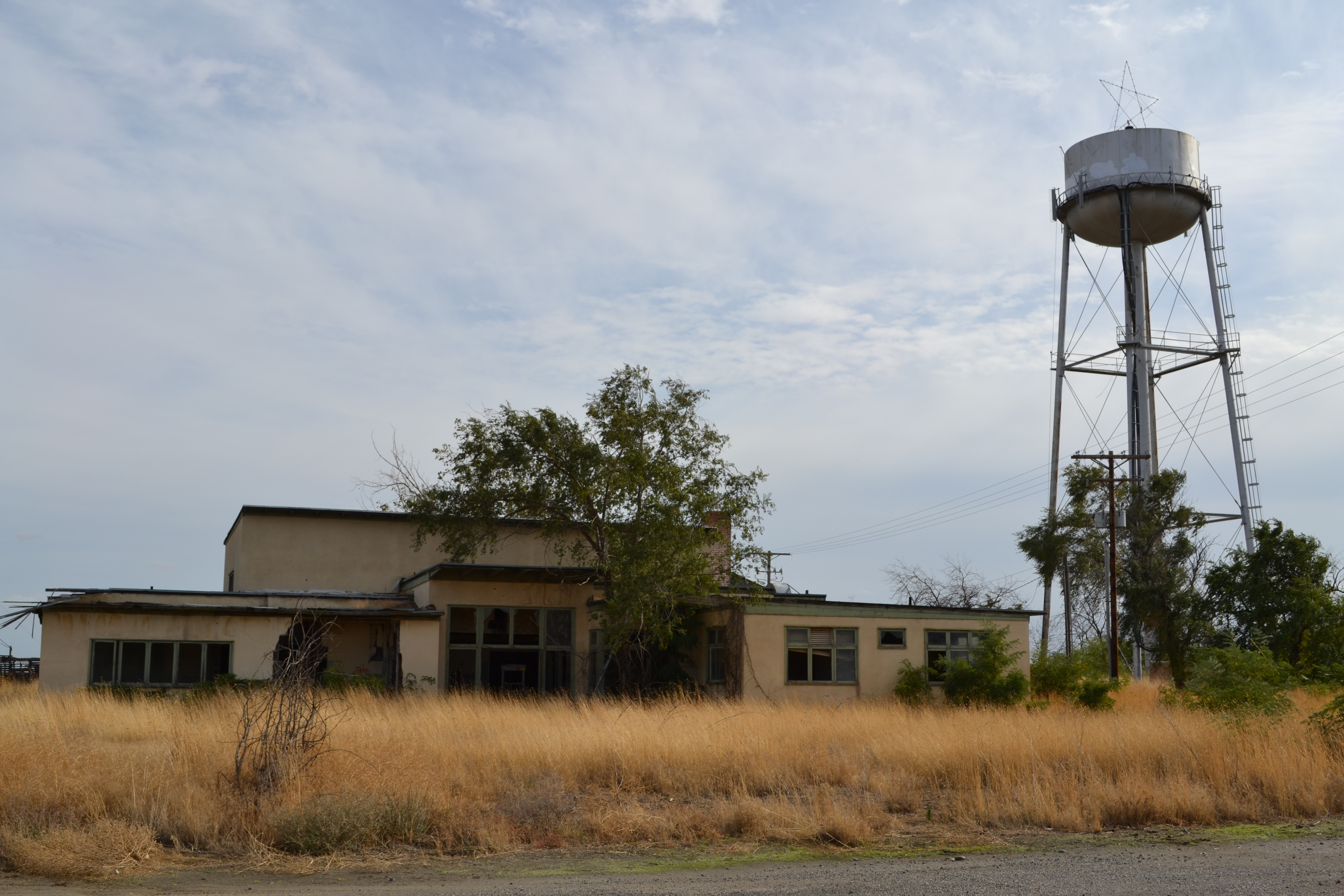
Ordnance, 2011

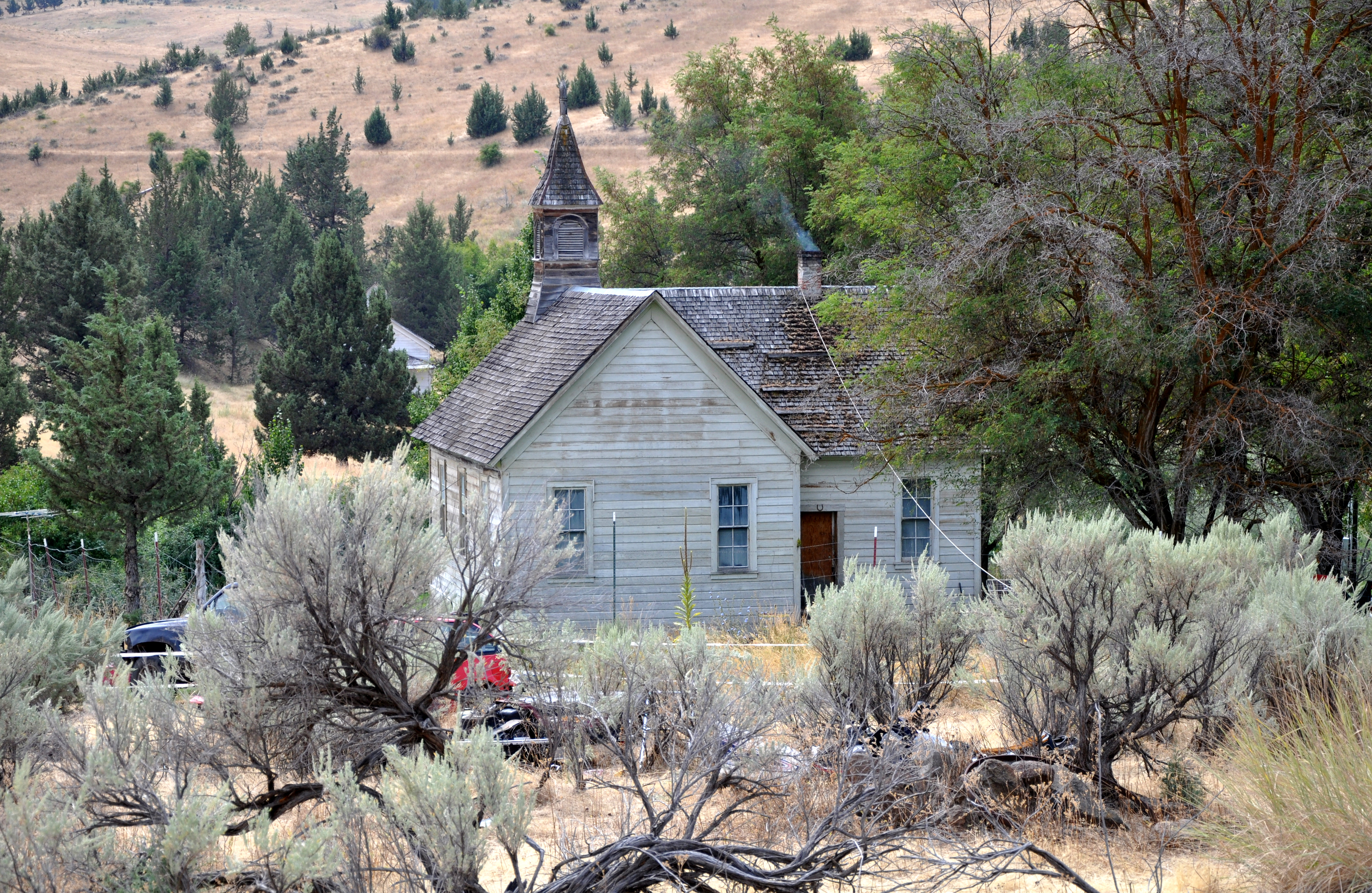
Richmond, 2011

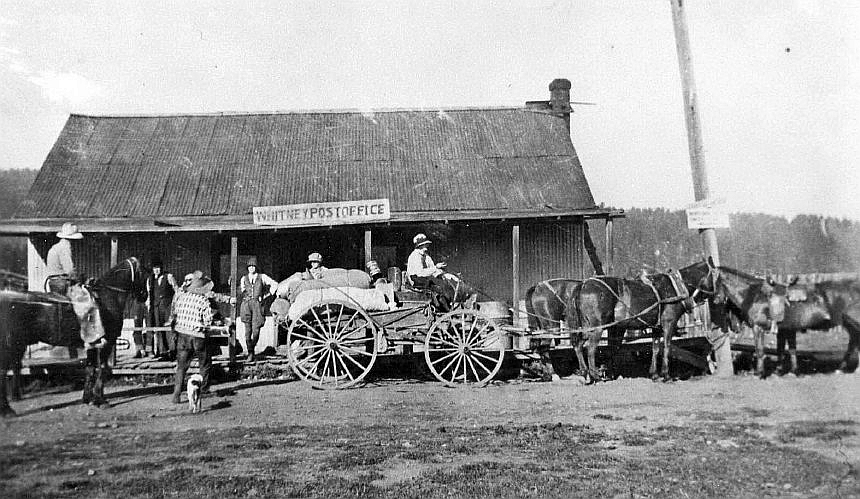
Whitney, c. 1900

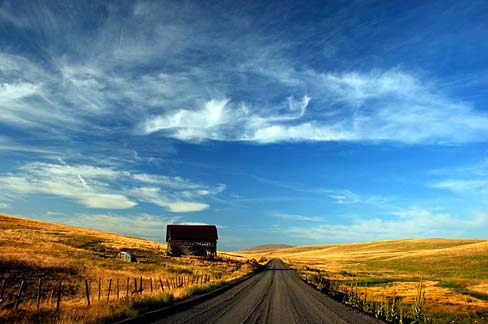
Zumwalt, 2009

Town	Est.	Disest.	County	Class	Notes	Refs.
Airlie	1882	1927	Polk	D	The railroad from Airlie north to Monmouth was abandoned in 1927, but the community survived, anchored by a general store and gas station.	
Ajax	1888	1940s	Gilliam	A	20 miles Northwest of Condon lies what's left of Ajax, along with its accompanying private use runway.	
All Hours	Unknown	Unknown	Josephine	A	A gold mining town 4 miles east of Takilma in the Illinois River Valley.	
Alma	1880s	Unknown	Lane	A	It was the location of a work camp for the county Department of Corrections in Lane County until 2008.	
Andrews	1880	1996	Harney	C	When it burned down in 1996, the community became a ghost town.	
Anlauf	1901	1946	Douglas	D	Near modern Curtin.	
Antelope	1871		Wasco	D	As more Rajneeshees moved to Antelope, more of the town's original residents sold their lots and left. The old-timers panicked, and held a vote to disincorporate.	
Arnet	<1900	1953	Lane	A	Destroyed and flooded during construction of Lookout Point Reservoir. Foundations and artifacts accessible during late-summer draw-downs.	
Apiary	1889		Columbia	D	Currently, Apiary Road is a popular freight route for forest products moving from the Northern Oregon Coast Range to markets in Longview, Washington.	
Ashwood	1870 (c.)		Jefferson	C		
Auburn	1861	1903	Baker	A	Site of first gold rush in eastern Oregon.	
Austin	1888	1950	Grant	C		
Bacona	1897		Washington	A	Four families from Denmark immigrated at the same time and settled in the area.	
Ballston	1878	1969	Polk	D	Previously known as “Ballsville”, the name of the post office was changed to Ballston in 1880.	
Bates	1917	1975	Grant	A	Named after Paul Chapman Bates	
Bayocean	1906	1953	Tillamook	A	Destroyed by coastal erosion; In 1971, the last remaining building (a garage) fell into the ocean.	
Beaver Hill	1896	1926	Coos	A		
Bethel	1865		Polk	D	The only remaining structure is a school, now serving as a church.	
Black Rock	1905	1943	Polk	A	In 1943, Black Rock was incorporated into the U.S. tree farm system.	
Blaine	1882		Tillamook	D	James G. Blaine. Smith was appointed postmaster in 1882.	
Blalock	1879	1968	Gilliam	A	Inundated by the John Day Dam in 1968.	
Blitzen	1915 (c.)	1943	Harney	B		
Bohemia City	1893	1922	Lane	B	The mining town depended on provisions from Cottage Grove.	
Boston	1858	1899	Linn	C-F	Partly resected and subsumed by Shedd in 1899.	
Bourne	1895		Baker	D	Originally named "Cracker City".	
Boyd	1861	1955	Wasco	C	Repurposed as farmland.	
Bradwood	1930	June 25, 1963	Clatsop	A	on June 25, 1963 the mill & entire town was sold at auction into private hands. A major fire in 1965 destroyed the mill & much of the remaining buildings, and another fire in 1984 took care of what buildings remained.	
Bridal Veil	1886		Multnomah	D		
Brighton	1912	1950s	Tillamook	D	Named for the seaside resort of Brighton, England. It was hoped the place would become a popular vacation spot.	
Browntown	1853	Unknown	Josephine	B	It was located near the mouth of Walker Gulch on Althouse Creek before being moved in 1876. The flat on which the town stood has been long since sluiced away, and no trace of the old townsite remains.	
Buena Vista	1850		Polk	D		
Bull Run	1893		Clackamas	D	Originally named Unavilla. Site of Bull Run Hydroelectric Powerhouse.	
Buncom	1851		Jackson	C		
Burlington	1855	1857	Linn	A	Burlington post office was established in 1855 and ran until 1857 when it was renamed Peoria and likely moved to the other town	
Butteville	1840		Marion	D		
Cabell City	1880s		Grant	B	Mining encampment; also contains cemetery.	
Cascadia	1892		Linn	C	Originally a stage stop on the Santiam Wagon Road, then a summer resort also known as Cascadia Mineral Springs, Cascadia had a post office established in 1898.	
Castle Rock	1881	1968	Morrow	A	In 1968 Lake Umatilla inundated the railroad bed and the adjacent highway. The railroad station was subsequently moved to a higher elevation about a mile south and renamed Castle.	
Carter	<1900	1953	Lane	A	Destroyed and flooded during construction of Lookout Point Reservoir.	
Cem	<1900	1953	Lane	A	Destroyed and flooded during construction of Lookout Point Reservoir.	
Champoeg	1841	1861	Marion	C-F	Destroyed by the great flood of 1862	
Chapman	1905	1990s	Columbia	A-F	Originally the terminus to the Portland & Southwestern Railroad. In 2005, the Port of St. Helens donated the Chapman Landing property for a future trailhead, park, and water connection.	
Cherryville	1884		Clackamas	D	Remaining cemetery designated local historic site in 2014.	
Chitwood	1887		Lincoln	D		
Chinatown	1864	1940s	Baker	A	In the 1970s, the last of its buildings were torn down.	
Clarksville	1862	1880s	Baker	A		
Clatsop Plains	1870	1910s	Clatsop	F	Clatsop Plains extended from the Skipanon River to Seaside. Eventually, Gearhart came into being and the town was subsumed by it.	
Clifton	1874		Clatsop	D		
Coe	1889	1952	Marion	B	The original townsite of Detroit (coe) was inundated in 1952 when the Corps of Engineers finished Detroit Dam on the Santiam River.	
Copper	1924	1980	Jackson	A	Remaining buildings demolished and/or flooded to make way for Applegate Lake.	
Copper	1904		Wallowa	B	Now part of Hells Canyon National Recreation Area	
Copperfield	1898	1927	Baker	A		
Cornucopia	1884		Baker	C		
Cross Hollows	1879	1911	Wasco	B	Thought to be the previous name for Shaniko, August Scherneckau arrived at Cross Hollows from Germany in 1874.	
Danner	1863		Malheur	D		
Dee	1906		Hood River	B		
De Moss Springs	1887		Sherman	C		
Divide	1900	1909	Lane	A		
Dolph	1880s	1960s	Tillamook	A	In 1916–1917, a new public road was built from the Little Nestucca road over Sourgrass Summit to join the old road, Because the new route to the coast was free, there was no longer a need to collect tolls and the town no longer had a reason to exist.	
Dufur	1893		Wasco	E		
Elk City	1868		Lincoln	D	Originally named Newton.	
Ellendale	1850		Polk	D		
Eola	1844		Polk	D		
Erskine	1882	1907	Sherman	A	Also known as Millra.	
Eureka	1892		Baker	B		
Eureka Bar	1903		Wallowa	B	As of 2015, only foundations of buildings remain.	
Farmington	1845	1904	Washington	D	Was known as Bridgeport for a short time.	
Fleetwood	1913	1938	Lake	A		
Flora	1897		Wallowa	D		
Fort Clatsop	1804		Clatsop	C		
Fort Stevens	1863		Clatsop	C		
Frankport	1850s	1905	Curry	A		
Fremont	1908	1922	Lake	A		
Friend	1903		Wasco	B		
Galena	1865		Grant	C		
Geiser	1898	1910s	Baker	A		
Geneva	1910		Jefferson	B		
Glencoe	1842	1910s	Washington	E-F	In 1910, a railroad line to Tillamook was built to the north of Glencoe with much of the community relocating one mile west to the new community of North Plains. Whole buildings were moved to the new town.	
Golden	1840 (c.)		Josephine	C-F	Golden has been a Oregon State Heritage Site since 2011.	
Grandview	1910 (c.)	1930 (c.)	Jefferson	B		
Granite	1867		Grant	D		
Grant	1880	1894	Sherman	C	Almost completely abandoned after a flood, This site is currently privately owned.	
Greenback	1897		Josephine	B		
Greenhorn	1897		Baker, Grant	C		
Greenville	1871		Washington	D		
Hardman	1881		Morrow	D		
Hobsonville	1870s	1940s	Tillamook	C	By World War II the community was largely defunct, with some portion of the Hobsonville Indian community moving to the town of Garibaldi.	
Horse Heaven	1933		Jefferson	B		
Idiotville	1945	1950s-1960s	Tillamook	A	Originally known as “Ryan’s Camp”, made to help with cleanup during the Tillamook Burn. The nearby Idiot Creek is named after the previous locale.	
Izee	1889		Grant	D		
Jawbone Flats	1931		Marion	C		
Jennyopolis	1851	1860s	Benton	A	The first murder in Oregons history took place here, it would go on to shape the State of Oregon's legal procedures and laws.	
Jimtown	1904		Baker	D		
Jonesboro		1990s	Malheur	A		
Keasey	August 5, 1890	1955	Columbia	A	There are no remains of the original community due to the destruction of the Portland, Astoria & Pacific Railroad.	
Kent	1887		Sherman	D		
Kerby	1884 (c.)		Josephine	E		
Kerry	1917	1940s	Columbia	C	It was founded to extend the Columbia & Nehalem River Railroad.	
Kernville	1896		Lincoln	D		
Kings Valley	1855		Benton	D		
Kingsley	1878	1930s (c.)	Wasco	B	After the construction of the Great Southern Railroad in 1913 & the Dalles-California Highway in 1926, these bypasses sealed the towns fate.	
Kinton	1894		Washington	D		
Kinzua	1927	1978	Wheeler	A		
Kirk	1920	1948	Klamath	A		
Kishwalks	1930s (c.)		Wasco	B	Likely named after Elijah Kishwalk, about 5 mi south east of Simnasho	
Klondike	1899	1951	Sherman	B		
Langell Valley	December 11, 1871	March 15, 1930	Klamath	E		
Lamonta	1890	1934	Jefferson	A	Originally named Desert.	
Latourell	1876		Multnomah	D		
Landax	<1900	1953	Lane	A	Destroyed and flooded during construction of Lookout Point Reservoir.	
Lawler	<1900	1953	Lane	A	Destroyed and flooded during construction of Lookout Point Reservoir. Long-term draw-downs of the reservoir have exposed the site in recent years.	
Leland	1855	1943	Josephine	D		
Lime	1899		Baker	B	Site of former lime cement plant.	
Linn City	1843	1861	Clackamas	A	Linn City was a community that existed from 1843 to 1861 and was destroyed in the Great Flood of 1862. The former site of Linn City was incorporated into the city of West Linn.	
Locust Grove	1895	1914	Sherman	B		
Longcoy	1890s	1900s	Lincoln	A	Longcoy only existed for about ten years. Taft on the north side of Schooner Creek and Siletz Bay were better settlement locations so residents moved.	
Lonerock	1881		Gilliam	D		
Luper	1850		Lane	A	Only the cemetery is visible, no remaining structures to be found.	
McCoy	1879		Polk	D		
McDonald	1904	1922	Sherman	A	Site of a former river crossing, only modern ranch buildings remain	
McEwen	1891		Baker	D		
Mabel	1878		Lane	A	Only modern structures are visible at the location.	
Malheur City	1863	1911 (c.)	Malheur	B	All wooden structures destroyed in 1957 brushfire, leaving only stone remnants.	
Marysville	1849	1853	Benton	F	Eventually became Corvallis on December 20, 1853	
Mayville	1884		Gilliam	D		
Maxville	1923	1933	Wallowa	A	No buildings remain.	
Medical Springs	1868		Union	D	As of 2014, three buildings remained.	
Miller	1860 (c.)		Sherman	A		
Millican	1913		Deschutes	D		
Mitchell	1873		Wheeler	E		
Narrows	1889		Harney	B		
Nelson	1880s		Baker	A	Location of lime cement plant between 1979 and 1980.	
New Era	1876		Clackamas	D	Also location of the New Era Spiritual Camp.	
New Pokegama	1903	1909	Klamath	A	Previously a freight & stage terminal, site located south off Green Springs Hwy.	
No Fog	June 7, 1915	Feb 28, 1918	Douglas	B	Also referred to as Nofog.	
Nolin	1860s		Umatilla	D	Originally named Happy Canyon.	
Nonpareil	1882		Douglas	D		
Old Pokegama	1897	1903	Klamath	A	The Sugar Pine Logging Company operated here. Nothing remains of the logging camp and all the railroad tracks were removed in the 1910s.	
Orleans	1850	1862	Linn	A	Significantly damaged in the Great Flood of 1862.	
Ordnance	1943		Umatilla	B		
Orodell	1867	1878	Union	A		
Ortley	1911	1922	Wasco	A		
Paisley	1873		Lake	E		
Palestine	1891	1903	Multnomah	F	Eventually subsumed by Portland.	
Persist	1902		Jackson	B		
Pine Grove			Umatilla	B	The old townsite can be found along W Birch Creek Rd, off of 395.	
Pinehurst	1878		Jackson	D	Public school still operating as of 2017.	
Pittsburg	1879		Columbia	D		
Placer	1885		Josephine	D		
Pocahontas	1862		Baker	A		
Pondosa	1927		Union	D		
Rajneeshpuram	1981	1988	Wasco	B	The Oregon Supreme Court closed its litigation in 1987, leaving Rajneeshpuram vacant, bankrupt, but legal within Oregon law.	
Richmond	1899		Wheeler	B		
Riverview			Umatilla	A		
Robinette	1898	1958	Baker	A	Inundated by Brownlee Reservoir in 1958.	
Robinsonville	1878	1880s	Grant	A		
Rock Point	1852		Jackson	C	Original tavern (est. 1864) restored by Del Rio Vineyards in 2001.	
Rowland	1886	1905	Linn	D		
Saint Joseph	1872		Yamhill	D		
Sanger	1871		Baker	B	Originally named Augusta; renamed Sanger in 1887.	
Scottsburg	1850		Douglas	D	Population significantly declined after Great Flood of 1862.	
Shaniko	1901	1911	Wasco	D		
Shelburn	1850 (c.)		Linn	D		
Sherar's Bridge	1860		Sherman	A		
Shevlin	1930s	1950s	Deschutes Klamath	B		
Silver Falls City	1888	1930s	Marion	A-F	It was home to approximately 200 people at its height. While none of the structures remain, a trace of this settlement can be seen at the Orchard Picnic Shelter, where the apple and pear trees date back to the Volz family homestead.	
Skipanon	1845	1903 (c.)	Clatsop	A-F	First known as Lexington, eventually known as Skipanon. Nothing remains because the settlement was eventually subsumed by Warrenton.	
Sodhouse	1872 (c.)	1878	Harney	B	Sodhouse was a short lived community near the present-day headquarters of the Malheur National Wildlife Refuge	
Southport	1875 (c.)	1890s	Coos	A		
Snooseville			Washington	A	About 8 miles north of Mountaindale, a sawmill used to stand in the town.	
Sparta	1872		Baker	B		
Spicer	1886	1904	Linn	D	Previously known as Lengs.	
Stauffer	1910	1950s	Lake	A	Residents originally wanted to name the post office Lost Creek. However, the United States postal system already had a post office with that name, so it was named after Charles Stauffer, who was the community's first postmaster.	
Sterlingville	1854	1957	Jackson	A		
Sumpter	1889		Baker	E		
Susanville	1864		Grant	B		
Tallman	1886	1923	Linn	D		
Thatcher	1895		Washington	D		
Thomas	1898	1920	Linn	D	The town took its name from the nearby Thomas Creek	
Thornberry	1916	1923	Sherman	A		
Three Lynx	1920s	2020s	Clackamas	B	On September 8, 2020, the Riverside Fire tore through the area, destroying all but five of the Three Lynx houses. The remaining buildings were removed in 2022, and the land returned to a more natural state.	
Tiller	1902		Douglas	C	Sold in 2018 to be converted into a resort.	
Valsetz	1919	1984	Polk	A		
Vanport	1942	May 30, 1948	Multnomah	A	Vanport was destroyed on May 30, 1948 due to the Columbia River Flood. The city was underwater by nightfall, leaving around 18,000 of its inhabitants homeless.	
Waldo	1852	1928	Josephine	A		
Weatherby	1879	1920	Baker	B-F	In 1884, the Oregon Railway and Navigation Company established a Weatherby station on its line to Huntington.	
Wendling	1899	1922	Lane	A		
Westfall	1870		Malheur	B	Originally named Bully.	
West Lake City	1905	1918	Klamath	B	Eliminated by irrigation and drainage projects, what was once White Lake is bisected by California State Route 161, connecting U.S. Highways 139 and 97.	
Wilcox			Sherman	A		
Whitney	1900		Baker	C	Logging declined in the area in the 1940s, which caused the town and the railroad to fade.	
Yarnell	1901		Lane	D		
Yaquina	1887	1930s	Lincoln	A	By the beginning of World War II, Toledo was the western terminus of the rail line, and the tracks from there to Yaquina were removed. Roughly 20 years later, the former seaport's population dropped to zero.	
Zena	1858		Polk	C		
Zumwalt	1903		Wallowa	B		

== See also ==
- Category:Former populated places in Oregon
- Lists of Oregon-related topics
- List of flooded towns in the United States § Oregon
- List of ghost towns in the United States

== Notes and references ==
=== Sources ===
- Baker, T. Lindsay (2003). More Ghost Towns of Texas. Norman, Oklahoma: University of Oklahoma Press. ISBN 978-0-806-13518-2.
- Case, George Baxter (1983). The History of the Port of Coos Bay (Thesis). Pan American University. OCLC 10205043.
- Corning, Howard McKinley (June 1947). "Ghost Towns on the Willamette of the Riverboat Period". Oregon Historical Quarterly. 48 (2): 55–67. JSTOR 20611743.
- Florin, Lambert (1971). Ghost Towns of the West. New York City: Promontory Press. ISBN 978-0-883-94013-6.
- Florin, Lambert (1992). Ghost Towns of the Pacific Frontier. New York City: Promontory Press. ISBN 978-0-883-94068-6.
- Friedman, Ralph (1990). In Search of Western Oregon. Caldwell, Idaho: Caxton Press. ISBN 978-0-870-04332-1.
- Hall, Shawn (2010). Ghost Towns and Mining Camps of Southern Nevada. Charleston, South Carolina: Arcadia Publishing. ISBN 978-0-738-57013-6.
- Hatton, Raymond; Chitwood, Lawrence; Garrett, Stuart (1996). Oregon's Sisters Country. Bend, Oregon: Geographical Books. ISBN 978-0-892-88260-1.
- McArthur, Lewis A.; McArthur, Lewis L. (1974) [1928]. Oregon Geographic Names (4th ed.). Portland, Oregon: Oregon Historical Society Press. OCLC 1135868.
- McArthur, Lewis A.; McArthur, Lewis L. (1991) [1928]. Oregon Geographic Names (6th ed.). Portland, Oregon: Oregon Historical Society Press. ISBN 978-0-87595-237-6.
- McArthur, Lewis A.; McArthur, Lewis L. (2003) [1928]. Oregon Geographic Names (7th ed.). Portland, Oregon: Oregon Historical Society Press. ISBN 978-0-875-95277-2.
- Metzler, Ken (1986). Best of Oregon. Portland, Oregn: Timber Press. ISBN 978-0-881-92028-4.
- Miller, Donald C. (1977). Ghost Towns of Washington and Oregon. Boulder, Colorado: Pruett Pub. Co. ISBN 978-0-871-08500-9.
- Miller, George R. (2017). Grant County. Charleston South Carolina: Arcadia Publishing. ISBN 978-1-467-12568-0.
- Romaine, Garret (2015). Gold Panning the Pacific Northwest: A Guide to the Area's Best Sites for Gold. Guilford, Connecticut: Falcon Guides. ISBN 978-1-493-01483-5.
- Smith, Earl R. (1963). The Westfall Country: The Story of an Eastern Oregon Community and the People Who Settled and Lived There. New York City: Exposition Press. OCLC 908823656.
- Thomsen, Clint (2012). Ghost Towns: Lost Cities of the Old West. New York: Bloomsbury. ISBN 978-1-782-00107-2.
- Varney, Phillip; Drew, Susan; Drew, Jonathan (2005). Ghost Towns of the Pacific Northwest: Your Guide to the Hidden History of Washington, Oregon, and British Columbia (1st ed.). Stillwater, Minnesota: Voyageur Press. ISBN 978-0-896-58592-8.
- Varney, Phillip (2013). Ghost Towns of the Pacific Northwest: Your Guide to the Hidden History of Washington, Oregon, and British Columbia (2nd ed.). Minneapolis, Minnesota: Voyageur Press. ISBN 978-0-760-34316-6.
- Weis, Norman D. (1971). Ghost Towns of the Northwest (1st ed.). Caldwell, Idaho: Caxton Press. ISBN 978-0-870-04201-0.
- Weis, Norman D. (2006) [1971]. Ghost Towns of the Northwest (10th ed.). Caldwell, Idaho: Caxton Press. ISBN 978-0-870-04358-1.
