= Ortley =

Ortley may refer to:

- Ortley (apple), an apple cultivar
- Ortley, Oregon, a former town in Wasco County
- Ortley, South Dakota, a town in Roberts County
- Dover Beaches South, New Jersey, commonly known as Ortley Beach
