= Bellefleur =

Bellefleur (French: Bellflower) may refer to:

== Places ==
- Bellefleur, New Brunswick, a Canadian community
- Belle Fleur, historic house in Vicksburg, Mississippi, U.S.; NRHP-listed

== Other ==
- Bellefleur (novel), a 1980 novel by Joyce Carol Oates
- Léon Bellefleur (1910–2007), a Canadian artist
- Bellefleur family, characters in American TV series True Blood
- Belle-Fleur apple, another name for the Bellflower apple
- Bellefleur, Oregon, the setting of the pilot episode of American TV series The X-Files
