= Bellflower =

Bellflower may refer to:

- Bellflower, California, a city in Los Angeles County, California, United States
- Bellflower, Illinois, a village in McLean County, Illinois, United States
- Bellflower, Missouri, a city in Montgomery County, Missouri, United States
- Bellflower, one of several plant species in the family Campanulaceae
  - Bellflower, one of any plant species in the genus Campanula
  - American bellflower
  - Chinese bellflower
  - Bonnet bellflower
- Bellflower (film), a 2011 American film
- Bellflower apple

== See also ==
- The Bellflower Bunnies, an animated series based on the Beechwood Bunny Tales book series by Geneviève Huriet
