= Granite, Oregon =

- City
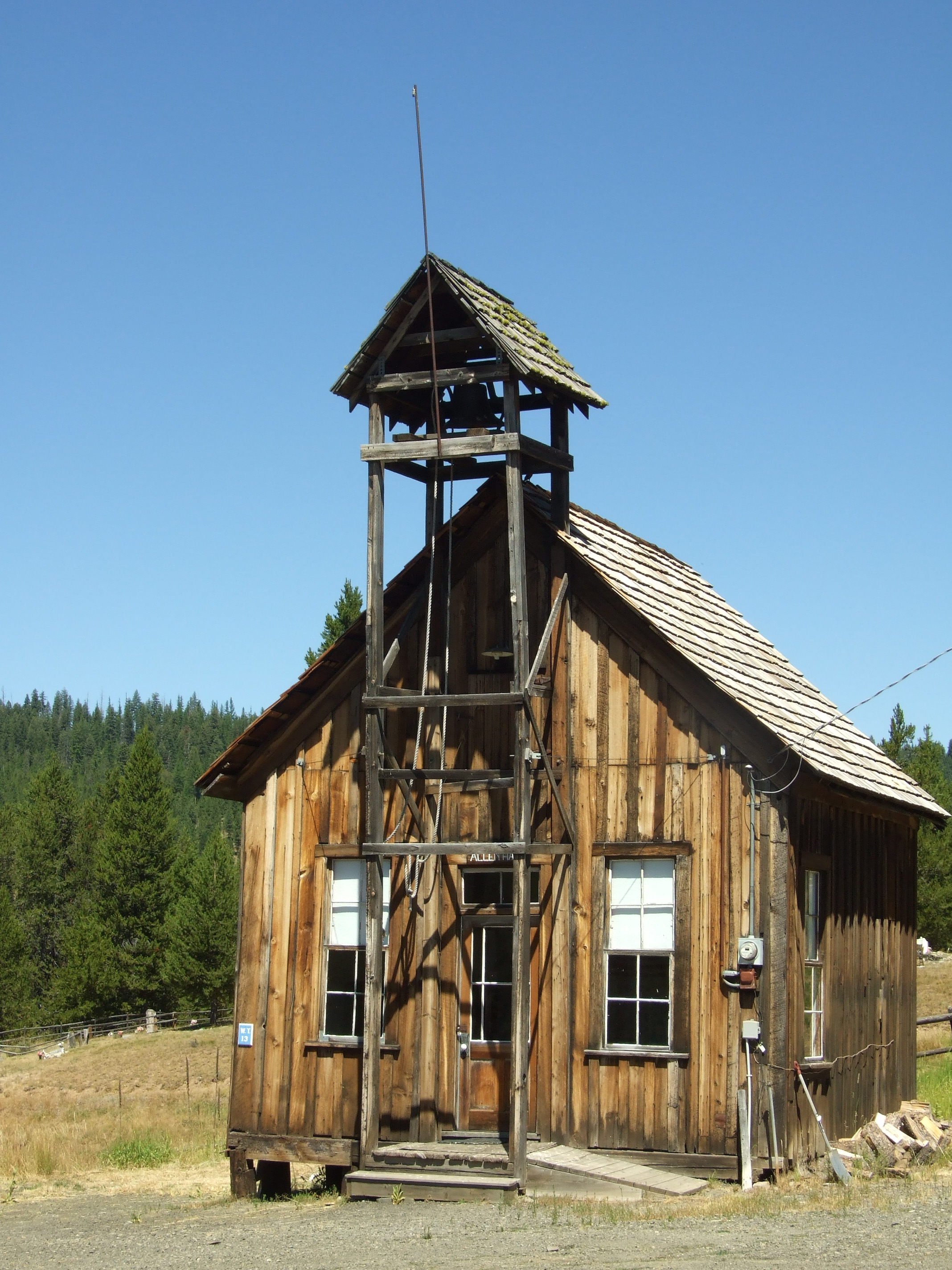

- Location in Oregon
- Coordinates: 44°48′36″N 118°25′07″W
- Country: United States
- State: Oregon
- County: Grant
- Incorporated: 1900

Government
  - Mayor: Dorothy Jewell

Area
  - Total: 0.38 sq mi (0.98 km^{2})
  - Land: 0.37 sq mi (0.96 km^{2})
  - Water: 0.0039 sq mi (0.01 km^{2})
- Elevation: 4,672 ft (1,424 m)

Population (2020)
  - Total: 32
  - Density: 85.9/sq mi (33.17/km^{2})
- Time zone: UTC-8 (Pacific)
  - Summer (DST): UTC-7 (Pacific)
- ZIP code: 97877
- Area codes: 458 and 541
- FIPS code: 41-30500
- GNIS feature ID: 2410642

Granite is a city in Grant County, in the U.S. state of Oregon. The city had a population of 30 in 2020, down from 38 in 2010. As of 2020, it is the fourth-smallest incorporated city by population in Oregon. The smaller cities were Shaniko (pop. 30), Lonerock (pop. 25), and nearby Greenhorn (pop. 3).

== History ==
First established by miners after the discovery of gold along Granite Creek on July 4, 1862, the area was originally called Granite Creek Falls. During the following year, a settlement called Granite City was established about 1.5 miles (2.4 km) downstream of where Granite City is now. It was moved to its current location in 1867 and renamed Independence after the date—July 4, or Independence Day—of the earlier gold discovery. However, when the community's post office was established in 1878, it could not use the name Independence because that name was already used by another Oregon city. Instead, the name Granite was chosen. The post office closed in 1957, but the city retained the name. The creek takes its name from the granite rocks that are common to the area.

The Ah Hee Diggings are located about one-mile north of the town.

In 1878, miner and business owner A. G. Tabor became the first postmaster. Grant Thornburg became the first mayor after the city incorporated in 1900.

A 1939 interview "Occupational and Social Life of Granite" recorded by William "Bill" Haight as part of the Federal Writers' Project, described the town and surroundings of Granite.

== Economy ==
In 1942, during World War II, the War Production Board shut down gold mining in the United States via Order No. L-208. The board deemed gold mining to be non-essential to the war effort, and it wanted gold miners to mine "essential" metals instead. Since Granite depended so heavily on gold mining, its economy collapsed when the mines shut down. Telephone and electric services to Granite ceased after the war. From 86 residents in 1940, the city's population dropped to 2 in 1960.

By 1990, the population had grown again to 10. In 2000, the population reached 24, and telephone service was restored. As of 2002, Granite had two employers: The Outback—which sold food, fuel, and supplies—and The Lodge.

As of September 2017 the population remains at 24. As of 2025, the Outback has shut down and the Lodge is shut down and for sale.

== Geography ==
Granite is in the Blue Mountains of eastern Oregon. It is 47 miles (76 km) west of Baker City by highway and 346 miles (557 km) east-southeast of Portland. According to the United States Census Bureau, the city has a total area of 0.37 square miles (0.96 km^{2}), all land.

The Elkhorn Drive Scenic Byway, a 106-mile (171 km) closed-loop route mainly through forests in the Elkhorn Mountains, passes through Granite. Other communities along the route are Baker City, Haines, and Sumpter, the latter about 11 miles (18 km) southeast of Granite.

== Demographics ==
Historical population
Census	Pop.	Note	%±
1870	448		—
1880	200		−55.4%
1890	249		24.5%
1900	245		−1.6%
1910	89		−63.7%
1920	55		−38.2%
1930	45		−18.2%
1940	86		91.1%
1950	40		−53.5%
1960	3		−92.5%
1970	4		33.3%
1980	17		325.0%
1990	8		−52.9%
2000	24		200.0%
2010	38		58.3%
2020	32		−15.8%

=== 2020 census ===
As of the 2020 census, Granite had a population of 32 and a median age of 60.6 years; 9.4% of residents were under the age of 18 and 43.8% were 65 years of age or older. For every 100 females there were 166.7 males, and for every 100 females age 18 and over there were 163.6 males age 18 and over.

As of the 2020 census, 0% of residents lived in urban areas while 100.0% lived in rural areas.

As of the 2020 census, there were 17 households in Granite, of which 5.9% had children under the age of 18 living in them. Of all households, 17.6% were married-couple households, 52.9% were households with a male householder and no spouse or partner present, and 17.6% were households with a female householder and no spouse or partner present. About 58.8% of all households were made up of individuals and 29.4% had someone living alone who was 65 years of age or older.

As of the 2020 census, there were 66 housing units, of which 74.2% were vacant. Among occupied housing units, 94.1% were owner-occupied and 5.9% were renter-occupied. The homeowner vacancy rate was 11.1% and the rental vacancy rate was <0.1%.

Racial composition as of the 2020 census
Race	Number	Percent
White	29	90.6%
Black or African American	0	0%
American Indian and Alaska Native	0	0%
Asian	0	0%
Native Hawaiian and Other Pacific Islander	0	0%
Some other race	1	3.1%
Two or more races	2	6.2%
Hispanic or Latino (of any race)	2	6.2%

=== 2010 census ===
As of the census of 2010, there were 38 people, 22 households, and 13 families residing in the city. The population density was about 103 inhabitants per square mile (40/km^{2}). There were 88 housing units at an average density of 238 per square mile (92/km^{2}). The racial makeup of the city was about 95% White and 5% Native American. Hispanic or Latino of any race were about 5% of the population.

There were 22 households, of which about 5% had children under the age of 18 living with them, 55% were married couples living together, 5% had a male householder with no wife present, and 41% were non-families. Thirty-two percent of all households were made up of individuals, and 9% had someone living alone who was 65 years of age or older. The average household size was about 1.7 and the average family size was about 2.

The median age in the city was 63 years. About 3% of residents were under the age of 18; none was between the ages of 18 and 24; 3% were from 25 to 44; 50% were from 45 to 64; and 45% were 65 years of age or older. The gender makeup of the city was 58% male and 42% female.

=== 2000 census ===
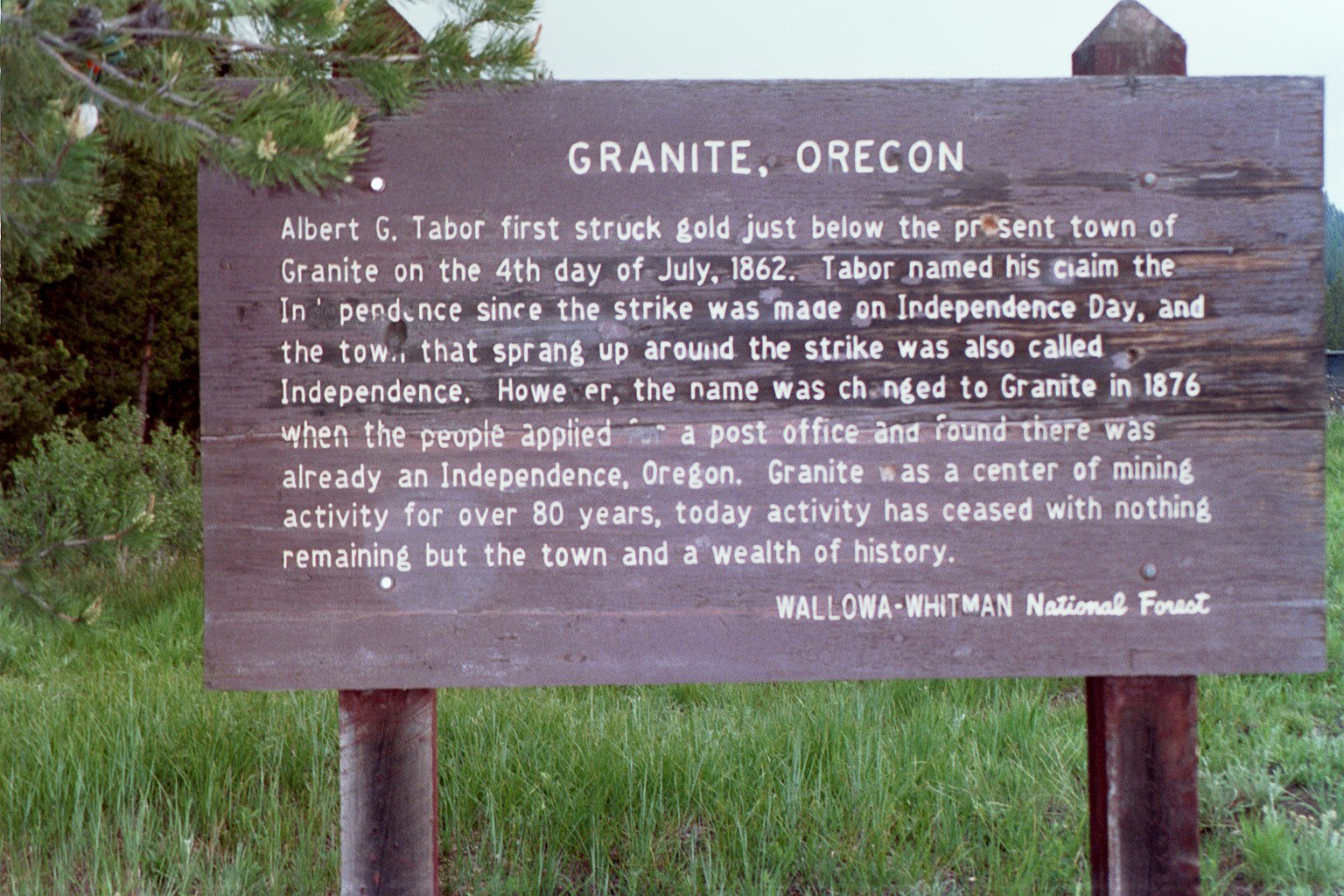
Sign describing Granite's origin

As of the census of 2000, there were 24 people, 15 households, and 9 families residing in the city. The population density was about 60 people per square mile (23/km^{2}). There were 74 housing units at an average density of 186 per square mile (72/km^{2}). The racial makeup of the city was 100% White. Hispanic or Latino of any race were 4% of the population.

There were 15 households, out of which none had children under the age of 18 living with them, 60% were married couples living together, none had a female householder with no husband present, and 40% were non-families. Forty percent of all households were made up of individuals, and 7% had someone living alone who was 65 years of age or older. The average household size was about 1.6 and the average family size was 2.

In the city, the population was spread out, with 21% from 25 to 44, 67% from 45 to 64, and 13% who were 65 years of age or older. The median age was 57 years. For every 100 females, there were 118 males. For every 100 females age 18 and over, there were 118 males.

The median income for a household in the city was $15,625, and the median income for a family was $20,625. Males had a median income of $11,250 versus $6,250 for females. The per capita income for the city was $8,024. About 20% of families and 36% of the population were below the poverty line, including 100% of those 65 and older.

== See also ==
- List of ghost towns in Oregon
