= Golden, Oregon =

Former town in Josephine County, Oregon, U.S.

- Ghost town
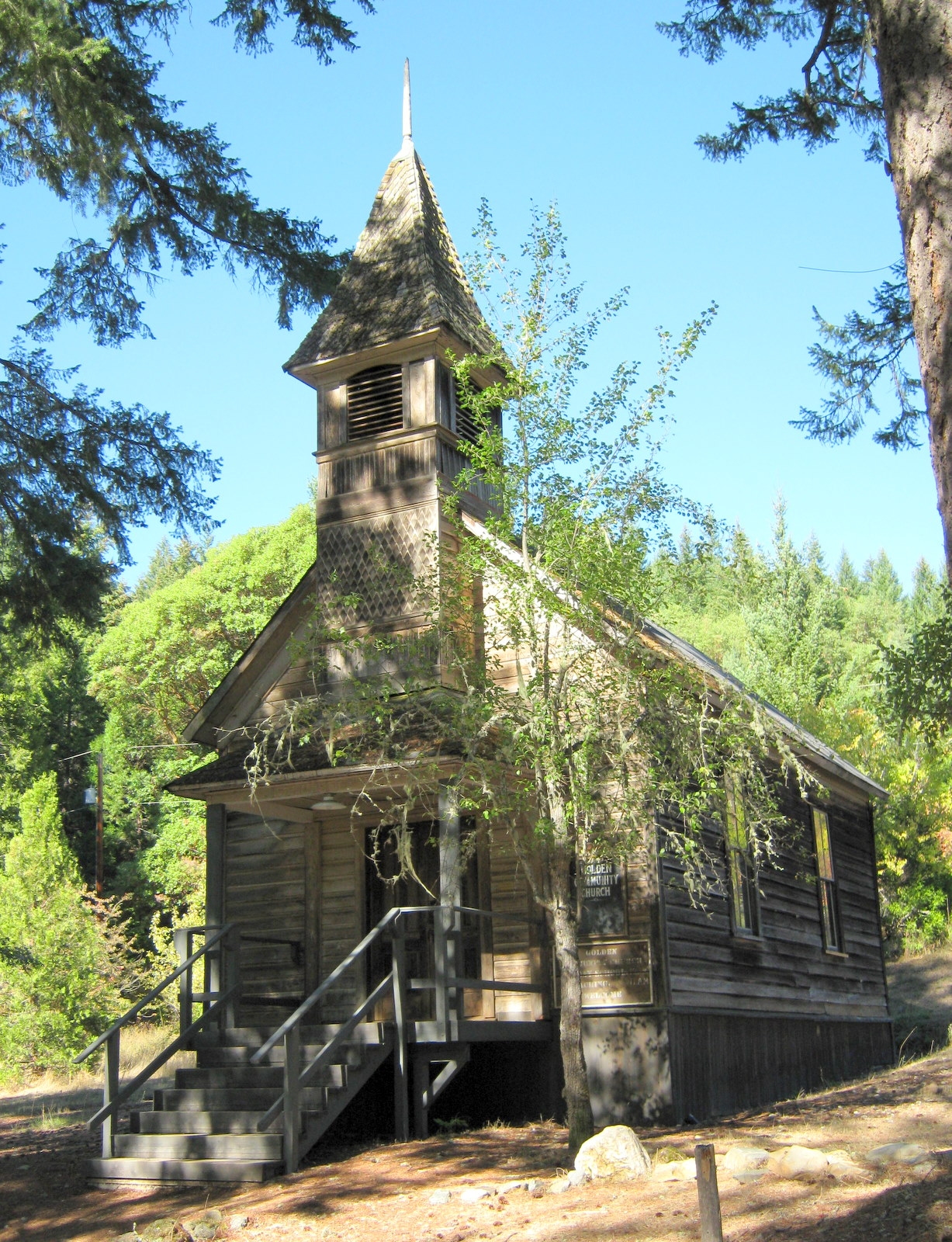
- Golden Community Church

- Location within Oregon Location within the United States
- Coordinates: 42°40′57.9″N 123°19′49.5″W
- Country: United States
- State: Oregon
- County: Josephine
- Time zone: UTC-8 (Pacific (PST))
  - Summer (DST): UTC-7 (PDT)
- Golden Historic District
- U.S. National Register of Historic Places
- U.S. Historic district
- Location: 3482 Coyote Creek Rd., Wolf Creek, Oregon
- Area: 98.6 acres (39.9 ha)
- Built: 1884
- Architectural style: Queen Anne
- NRHP reference No.: 02000825
- Added to NRHP: July 25, 2002

Golden is an abandoned mining town located at Coyote Creek in Josephine County, Oregon, United States.

== History ==
Wolf Creek was first settled by Europeans in the late 1840s, when gold was discovered. However, most of the settlers left when gold was found in the nearby Salmon River in 1850. The abandoned town was eventually used by Chinese miners, who took over the abandoned mines. Several years later, they were driven out as the previous inhabitants (the European settlers) returned from the Salmon River.

A hydraulic mine was built, and in 1885, a schoolhouse was built about a 1/2-mile (0.80 km) downstream from Golden.

By 1892, over 150 people lived along Coyote Creek. A Campbellite church and general store were constructed, and in 1896 the Golden post office established. In 1915, a stamp mill was built.

In 1920, the post office closed.

The church was rebuilt in 1950. The general store, carriage house, and several homes are still standing today.

The Golden Historic District is listed on the National Register of Historic Places. Golden has been an Oregon State Heritage Site since 2011.

The town was featured in the paranormal investigation show Ghost Adventures, as the town–especially the church–are claimed to be haunted by demonic entities. Several locals shared their experiences of being possessed or feeling disoriented. The attraction Oregon Vortex is also featured.

== See also ==
- List of ghost towns in Oregon
