= Ordnance, Oregon =

Ordnance
- Ghost town
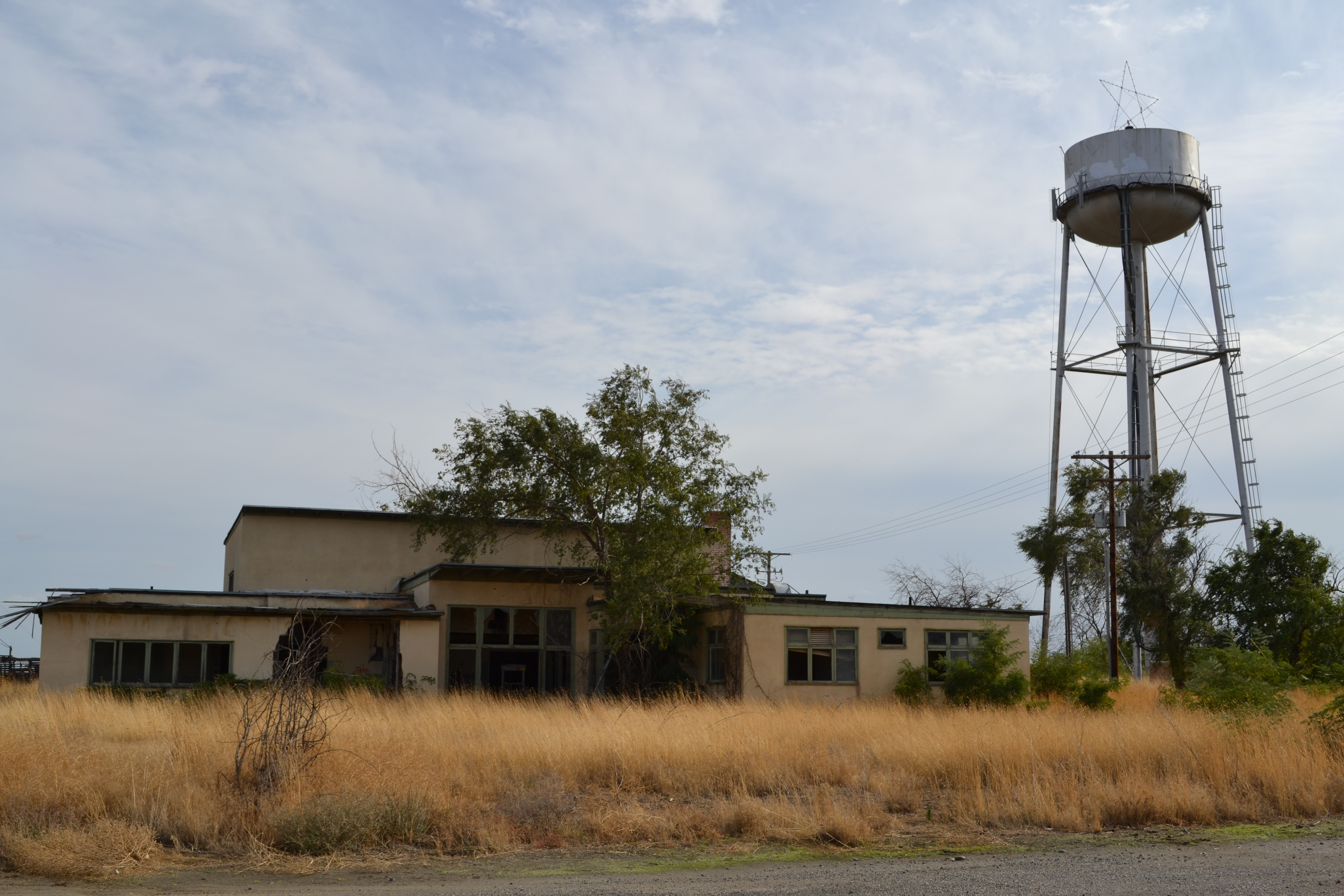

- Location within the state of Oregon
- Coordinates: 45°47′48″N 119°25′01″W
- Country: United States
- State: Oregon
- County: Umatilla
- Elevation: 587 ft (179 m)
- Time zone: UTC-8 (Pacific (PST))
  - Summer (DST): UTC-7 (PDT)
- Area code: 541
- GNIS feature ID: 1136600

Ordnance is a ghost town in Umatilla County, Oregon, United States, southwest of Hermiston on Interstate 84/U.S. Route 30, near the intersection with Interstate 82. In 1941, the United States Department of War commissioned the establishment of the Umatilla Ordnance Depot (later the Umatilla Army Depot, then the Umatilla Chemical Depot) in northern Umatilla County. The town was named after the depot, and Ordnance post office was established in 1943. Due to gradual reductions in military funding for the area after World War II, by the 1960s, Ordnance was no longer a community.

== See also ==
- List of ghost towns in Oregon
