= Orleans, Oregon =

Ghost town in Oregon, United States

Orleans was a city in Linn County, Oregon, United States. It was established around 1850 and destroyed in the Great Flood of 1862. It was not rebuilt. The city was located across the Willamette River from Corvallis. The Orleans cemetery survived because it was built on high ground at 44.5697°N 123.1913°W.

== See also ==
- List of ghost towns in Oregon
