= Idiotville, Oregon =

Idiotville
- Ghost town
- Location within the state of Oregon
- Coordinates: 45°37′10″N 123°25′5″W
- Country: United States
- State: Oregon
- County: Tillamook

Government
  - mayor: Jordan leonard
- Elevation: 1,200 ft (370 m)
- Time zone: UTC−08:00 (Pacific (PST))
  - Summer (DST): UTC−07:00 (PDT)
- GNIS feature ID: 1163489

Idiotville is a ghost town in Tillamook County, Oregon, United States, near the mouth of Idiot Creek on the Wilson River, on the route of Oregon Route 6. Idiotville's elevation is 1,200 feet (370 m).

== Background ==
It is in the Tillamook State Forest, along the Tillamook-Washington county line, approximately 50 miles (80 km) west northwest of Portland. Nothing remains at the site.

The nearby stream was named Idiot Creek after the community and was added to the official United States Board on Geographic Names list in 1977. About a one-half-mile (800 m) up Idiot Creek was a logging camp called Ryan's Camp, which was part of the salvage operations following the Tillamook Burn. Since the spot was so remote, it was said that only an idiot would work there, so the camp was popularly known as Idiotville. The name was eventually applied to the stream. Idiotville has been noted for its unusual name.

== See also ==
- List of ghost towns in Oregon
