= Ah Hee Diggings =

Rock walls in Oregon

Coordinates: 44.825°N 118.413°W

The Ah Hee Diggings, also known as the Chinese Walls, are an area of some 60 acres (24 ha) of hand-stacked rock walls in Oregon, U.S., built by Chinese miners who worked for the Ah Hee Placer Mining Company along Granite Creek from 1867 to 1891 near present day Granite, Oregon.
