= Ortley, Oregon =

Coordinates: 45.655953°N 121.288128°W

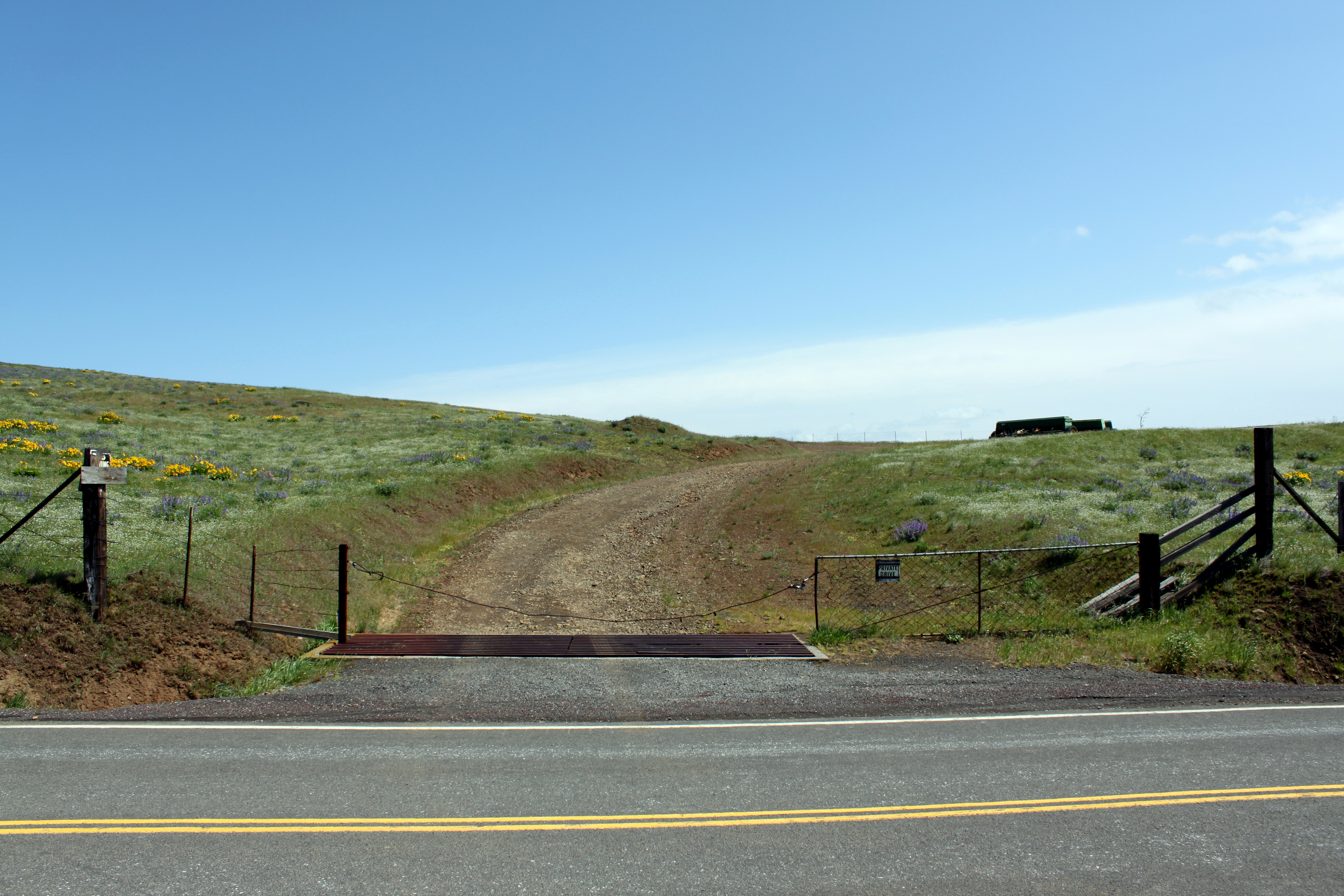
Modern-day road to Ortley, Oregon (private property)

Ortley is a former town in Wasco County, Oregon, in the United States. It was about 1 mile (2 km) south of Rowena and about 7 miles (11 km) southeast of Mosier; the site is now on private land, and no evidence of the townsite exists today. It is still classed as a populated place by the USGS.

== History ==
Ortley was initially developed by the Hood River Orchard & Land Company, which filed a plat for the townsite in 1911, naming it for the "Ortley" apple. The company sold town lots and small orchard parcels, and Ortley quickly grew to a population of 300. The community included a post office, several shops and a hotel. However, the land proved unsuitable for apple production because of the prevailing high winds and water scarcity. By 1922, the town was all but abandoned, and the post office closed that year.

== See also ==
- List of ghost towns in Oregon
