= Frankport, Oregon =

Frankport Frankfort
- Ghost town
- Location within Oregon Location within the United States
- Coordinates: 42.5928873°N 124.4012147°W
- Country: United States
- State: Oregon
- County: Curry
- Founded: 1850s
- Abandoned: 1905
- Named after: S.H. Frank Tannery
- Elevation: 69 ft (21 m)
- Lowest elevation (Pacific Ocean): 0 ft (0 m)
- Time zone: UTC−08:00 (PST)
  - Summer (DST): UTC−07:00 (PDT)
- ZIP Code: 97465
- Area codes: 541 and 458
- License plate: Oregon

Frankport, also called Frankfort, is a ghost town in Curry County, Oregon. The town was centered on Frankport Beach, located in what is now Sisters Rocks State Park. Also part of Frankport was an island off the coast that was home to a shipping dock. The island, one of the three Sisters Rocks, was connected to the mainland by a bridge with a wooden railway.

== Etymology ==
Frankport was named after the S.H. Frank Tannery in Redwood City, California, where it would ship Notholithocarpus densiflorus bark to.

== History ==
Frankport was founded in the 1850s by gold prospectors from California. The town's shipping dock closed in 1905. All that remains of Frankport today is metal debris scattered throughout Frankport Beach.

== See also ==
- List of ghost towns in Oregon
