= Thornberry, Oregon =

- Unincorporated community
- Location within Oregon Location within the United States
- Coordinates: 45.63208°N 120.76324°W
- Country: United States
- State: Oregon
- County: Sherman
- Time zone: UTC-8 (Pacific (PST))
  - Summer (DST): UTC-7 (PDT)

Thornberry is a former community in Sherman County, Oregon, United States, founded in 1916. Formerly known as Grebe, Thornberry was named for Harvey B. Thornberry, who became the second postmaster in January 1919. The town post office was officially closed in November 1923. Thornberry is contemporarily considered a ghost town.
