= Lonerock, Oregon =

- City
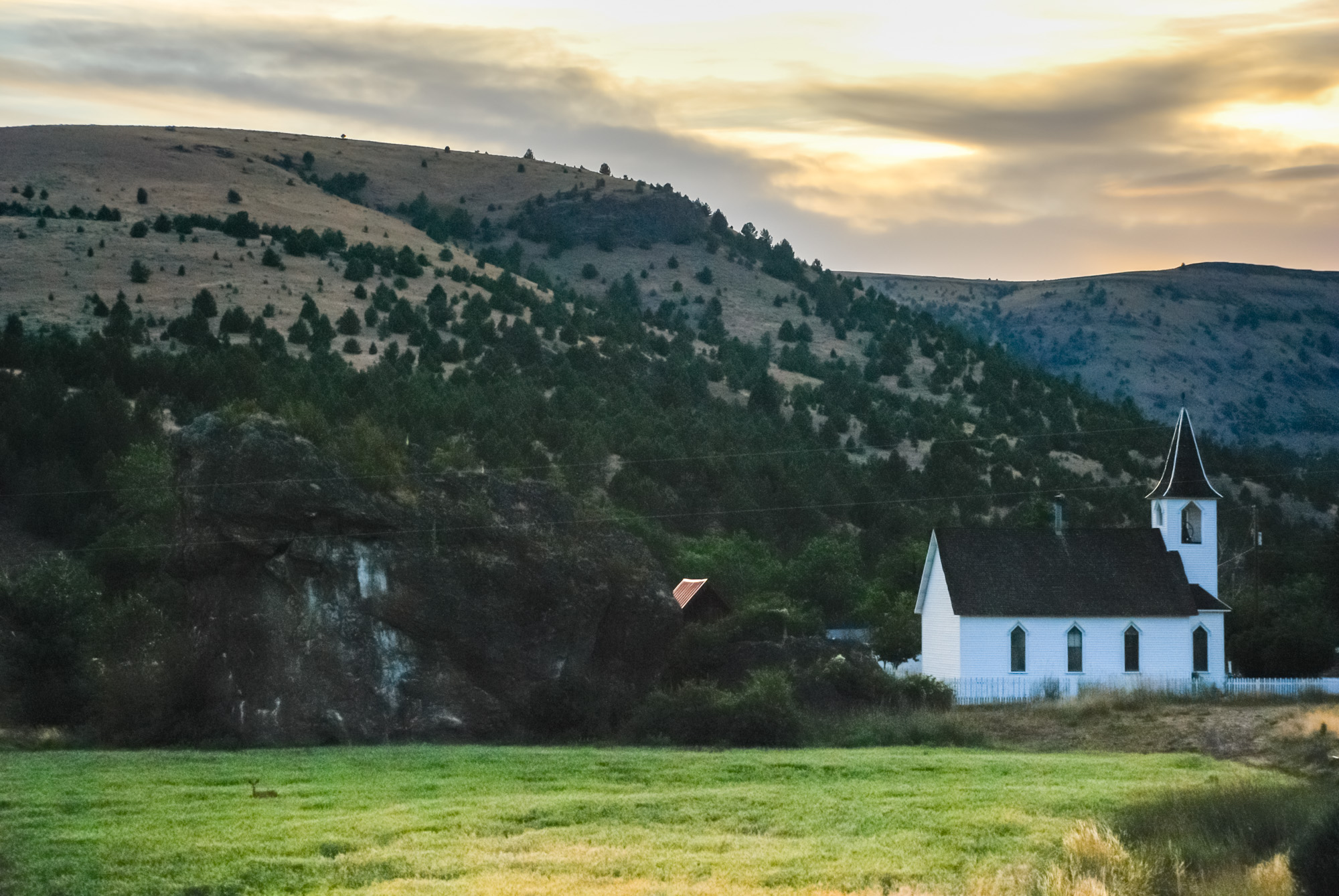

- Location in Oregon
- Coordinates: 45°05′20″N 119°53′02″W
- Country: United States
- State: Oregon
- County: Gilliam
- Incorporated: 1901

Government
  - Mayor: Stan Forrest

Area
  - Total: 1.01 sq mi (2.62 km^{2})
  - Land: 1.01 sq mi (2.62 km^{2})
  - Water: 0 sq mi (0.00 km^{2})
- Elevation: 2,835 ft (864 m)

Population (2020)
  - Total: 25
  - Density: 24.7/sq mi (9.55/km^{2})
- Time zone: UTC-8 (Pacific)
  - Summer (DST): UTC-7 (Pacific)
- ZIP code: 97823
- Area codes: 458 and 541
- FIPS code: 41-43400
- GNIS feature ID: 2410865

Lonerock is a city in Gilliam County, Oregon, United States, twenty miles east of Condon. The population was 25 at the 2020 census.

== History ==
The settlement began in the early 1870s, as a service center for the surrounding ranches. It was platted in 1882 as "Lone Rock", named for an unusual, 35-foot (11 m)-high rock that still stands in the town near the old Methodist church. The U.S. Postal Service had a preference for one-word names, so name of the post office was "Lonerock", which eventually became the community's official name. The city's population grew from 68 in 1900 to 70 in 1910, 73 in 1920, to a high of 82 in 1930. By 1940, Lonerock's population dwindled to 46, dropped to 38 in 1950, 31 in 1960, and to 12 residents in 1970. The population increased to 26 citizens in 1980, before falling to 11 in the 1990 census.

The first settlers to the area arrived in 1871. The Lonerock area, in a valley cut by a small stream, was lush with grasses, and the surrounding hills abounded with game animals. In 1874, Edward Wineland erected a water-powered sawmill at Lonerock, which allowed construction and settlement to thrive, and, in 1875, a post office was established.

by 1882 the area was secured and the town was incorporated, one of the county's first. Postmaster RG Robinson was elected mayor of the new government.

In 1888, a two-room school building was erected, and 1-12 grade education was provided. The school's final graduation was in 1932. In 1898, Reverend Deuse joined the community and built a Methodist church that held weekly services for many years. As of 2020, the church still stands, and occasionally holds services. The small white church has become as iconic to the Lonerock community as the rock itself.

In July 1896, the town was almost destroyed by fire. The entire business portion burned and only a few dwellings were left on the outskirts of town. The blaze was reportedly started by a boy playing with matches.

By 1900, the town's population stood at 68; new settlers were arriving and several businesses operated within its limits. Many of the surrounding homesteads had become successful ranches and farms that occupied thousands of acres on the surrounding hillsides. A varied economy was arising, including hunting for sport, fishing, and winter sledding. An annual rodeo, held on the middle of Main Street, became a popular event, attracting participants and spectators from the surrounding area. By the 1920s, rodeos in the surrounding areas grew larger and Lonerock's annual rodeo was no longer the main attraction; its final year was 1934. The economy also declined as businesses and activities migrated to larger settlements in the area. The town's population shrank by nearly half from 1930 to 1940.

Early settlers from Scotland formed much of the sheep-based early economy. This part of the economy gradually evaporated due to a mixture of fluctuating sheep prices and the increased prevalence of cattle raising in the area. The lush grasses on the area's hillsides allowed cattle raising, which currently accounts for nearly all the city's economy. The other part of the agricultural economy is hay production. Lonerock's climate would not support hay farming at first, but the introduction of various irrigation methods in the Lonerock valley allowed alfalfa to thrive.

== Geography ==
According to the United States Census Bureau, the city has a total area of 1.01 square miles (2.62 km^{2}), all of it land.

== Demographics ==
Historical population
Census	Pop.	Note	%±
1910	70		—
1920	73		4.3%
1930	82		12.3%
1940	46		−43.9%
1950	38		−17.4%
1960	31		−18.4%
1970	12		−61.3%
1980	26		116.7%
1990	11		−57.7%
2000	24		118.2%
2010	21		−12.5%
2020	25		19.0%
US Decennial Census

=== 2020 census ===
As of the 2020 census, Lonerock had a population of 25. The median age was 72.5 years. 8.0% of residents were under the age of 18 and 60.0% of residents were 65 years of age or older. For every 100 females there were 66.7 males, and for every 100 females age 18 and over there were 53.3 males age 18 and over.

0% of residents lived in urban areas, while 100.0% lived in rural areas.

There were 17 households in Lonerock, of which 41.2% had children under the age of 18 living in them. Of all households, 17.6% were married-couple households, 5.9% were households with a male householder and no spouse or partner present, and 41.2% were households with a female householder and no spouse or partner present. About 11.8% of all households were made up of individuals and <0.1% had someone living alone who was 65 years of age or older.

There were 27 housing units, of which 37.0% were vacant. Among occupied housing units, 88.2% were owner-occupied and 11.8% were renter-occupied. The homeowner vacancy rate was <0.1% and the rental vacancy rate was <0.1%.

Racial composition as of the 2020 census
Race	Number	Percent
White	21	84.0%
Black or African American	0	0%
American Indian and Alaska Native	0	0%
Asian	1	4.0%
Native Hawaiian and Other Pacific Islander	0	0%
Some other race	0	0%
Two or more races	3	12.0%
Hispanic or Latino (of any race)	2	8.0%

=== 2010 census ===
As of the 2010 United States census, there were 21 people, 12 households, and 5 families in the city. The population density was 20.8 inhabitants per square mile (8.0/km^{2}). There were 25 housing units at an average density of 24.8 per square mile (9.6/km^{2}). The racial makeup of the city was 100.0% White.

There were 12 households, of which 8.3% had children under the age of 18 living with them, 33.3% were married couples living together, 8.3% had a female householder with no husband present, and 58.3% were non-families. 50.0% of all households were made up of individuals, and 50% had someone living alone who was 65 years of age or older. The average household size was 1.75 and the average family size was 2.40.

The median age in the city was 54.5 years. 4.8% of residents were under the age of 18; 0% were between the ages of 18 and 24; 19.1% were from 25 to 44; 28.5% were from 45 to 64; and 47.6% were 65 years of age or older. The gender makeup of the city was 42.9% male and 57.1% female.

=== 2000 census ===
As of the 2000 United States census, there were 24 people, 15 households, and 7 families in the city. The population density was 24.1 people per square mile (9.3/km^{2}). There were 27 housing units at an average density of 27.1 per square mile (10.5/km^{2}). The racial makeup of the city was 100.00% White.

There were 15 households, out of which 13.3% had children under the age of 18 living with them, 33.3% were married couples living together, 13.3% had a female householder with no husband present, and 53.3% were non-families. 53.3% of all households were made up of individuals, and 33.3% had someone living alone who was 65 years of age or older. The average household size was 1.60 and the average family size was 2.29.

The town's population contained 16.7% under the age of 18, 16.7% from 25 to 44, 33.3% from 45 to 64, and 33.3% who were 65 years of age or older. The median age was 60 years. For every 100 females, there were 71.4 males. For every 100 females age 18 and over, there were 66.7 males.

The median income for a household in the city was $12,500, and the median income for a family was $20,938. Males had a median income of $0 versus $13,750 for females. The per capita income for the city was $8,857. There are 33.3% of families living below the poverty line and 17.9% of the population, including no under eighteens and none of those over 64.

== See also ==
- List of ghost towns in Oregon
