= Lamonta, Oregon =

- Location within Oregon Location within the United States
- Coordinates: 44.4692894°N 121.0358677°W
- Country: United States
- State: Oregon
- County: Jefferson
- Time zone: UTC-8 (Pacific (PST))
  - Summer (DST): UTC-7 (PDT)

Lamonta was a town located in Jefferson County, Oregon, United States, established in 1890, and abandoned in 1934.

Located along The Dalles-John Day stage route, Lamonta contained a post office, school, blacksmith, livery, hotel, stores, four saloons and a dance hall. Following a series of crop failures and droughts in the 1920s, Lamonta was mostly abandoned by 1934. By 1939, Lamonta was considered a ghost town.

Original traces of town were burned down to make room for the new substation.
