= Malheur City, Oregon =

- Unincorporated community
- Location within Oregon Location within the United States
- Coordinates: 44°24′47″N 117°43′30″W
- Country: United States
- State: Oregon
- County: Malheur
- Elevation: 3,940 ft (1,200 m)
- Time zone: UTC-8 (Pacific (PST))
  - Summer (DST): UTC-7 (PDT)
- GNIS feature ID: 1161431

Malheur City is a ghost town in Malheur County, Oregon, United States, situated along Willow Creek. The town was established in 1863 after miners struck gold in the nearby El Dorado mine. Originally located in Baker County, Malheur City became part of Malheur County after the county's formation in 1887. The town became unpopulated around 1911 after mining operations slowed in the area. On August 16, 1957, a brushfire burned all of the town's remaining wooden structures, leaving only stone foundations.
