= Three Lynx, Oregon =

Three Lynx
- Ghost town
- Interactive map of Three Lynx
- Location within the state of Oregon Three Lynx (the United States)
- Coordinates: 45°07′34″N 122°04′17″W
- Country: United States
- State: Oregon
- County: Clackamas
- First company presence: 1907
- First constructions: 1909
- Founded: 1923
- Extinction: 2020
- Founder: Portland Railway, Light and Power Company

Government
  - Administration: United States Forest Service

Population
  - Total: 0
- ZIP codes: 97723
- Area code: 503/971

Three Lynx is a ghost town in Clackamas County in the U.S. state of Oregon. The town was inhabited up until 2020, when the last few houses in the area were torn down. The ghost town is located twenty miles east of Estacada in the Mount Hood National Forest.

The town, before becoming a ghost town, was notably one of the last few company towns in the United States.

== History ==
Even before the establishment of the company town, back in 1907, the area saw the presence of the Portland Railway, Light and Power Company.

References to the area dates back to 1909, with the name of Three Links. This name appeared in various publications throughout the years, including the "Estacada quadrangle" map published by USGS in 1916. This name would stick around up until the 50s, when the settlement was already established.

The town began as a "construction camp" as early as 1923, under the name Camp 8. The settlement was originally built by the Portland Railway, Light and Power Company, now known as Portland General Electric (PGE).

The town initially had only seven cabins, mostly made by the Aladdin Company. The town soon developed into a permanent worker community. It provided various amenities, such as housing, education and community activities for the residents for nearly eight decades. Notably, the school of the town was frequented by various neighbouring communities, organizing various events and becoming one of the driving forces of the town. The school house within the settlement was closed in 1988, and was torn down in 2014.

Following the 1930s, the U.S. Forest Service employed workers in the area, who used the town as a place to rest and to settle due to their isolated work locations.

In the mid-1950s, the town was growing and had initiated various community-based initiatives, such as the construction of a pool in the area and the expansion of the school in 1964, and by the late 1960s modern offices had started to replace the ones constructed during the founding of the city, showing signs of progress. However, by the 1970s, despite the low rents, the number of inhabitants started to decrease. Connections to Estacada were not passable during winter, and a single small self-propelled railcar was the only viable option to exit the town during winter, making things worse. Despite the fact that the town kept up with the various technological developments of the rest of the United States, the trend of depopulation did not stop, reaching a point of no return by 1992, when six of the Three Lynx houses were vacant. By 2003, buildings started to be removed and costs started to rise exponentially for PGE.

One of the main factors for this depopulation was that the company no longer needed as many workers in the area after the powerhouse was modernized, leading to many families to believe it was best to move somewhere else.

In 2018, PGE started to consider dropping its involvement in the town and searched for a successor to take care of the town in its place. In addition to wanting to address the growing costs and condition of living of the last few inhabitants, PGE recognized the town's historical significance as one of the last company towns, reaching out to local and national companies that might be interested in holding the ownership of the town, as well as to various social media websites (The town was eligible for the "National Register of Historic Places" up to September 2020). Despite this process becoming increasingly hard with the increasing costs of the local failing septic system in 2019, PGE's efforts continued up to the summer of 2020, even after the final permanent residents left the town in January 2020.

However, on September 8, 2020, the Riverside Fire destroyed most of the houses in the community, leaving behind only five buildings and striking the final blow to the dying town. Despite PGE claiming that the site would become archeologically and historically important for future generations, the last few houses in the area were completely demolished in 2022, and the area reverted to a natural status currently preserved by the local U.S. Forest Service department. This means the settlement had a lifespan of 97 years.
