= Miller, Oregon =

- Unincorporated community
- Location within Oregon Location within the United States
- Coordinates: 45.639570°N 120.892560°W
- Country: United States
- State: Oregon
- County: Sherman
- Time zone: UTC-8 (Pacific (PST))
  - Summer (DST): UTC-7 (PDT)

Miller is a former community in Sherman County, Oregon, United States, established circa 1860. It was named for Thomas Jefferson Miller, a settler of the area, also for which Miller Island on the Columbia River takes its name. Miller is contemporarily considered a ghost town.
