= Bayocean, Oregon =

Oregon Ghost Town

Coordinates: 45.5276032°N 123.9523544°W

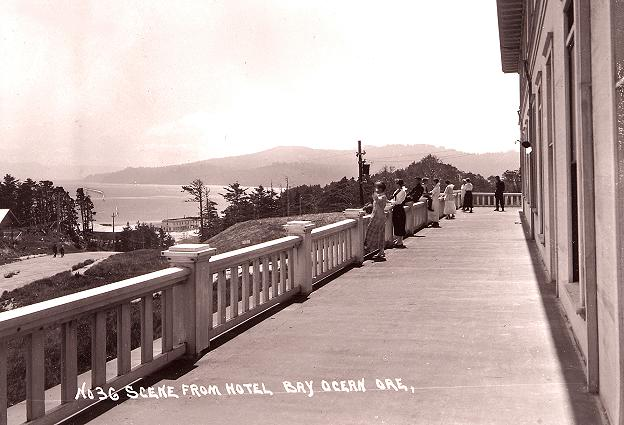
A view from the hotel that once existed in Bayocean

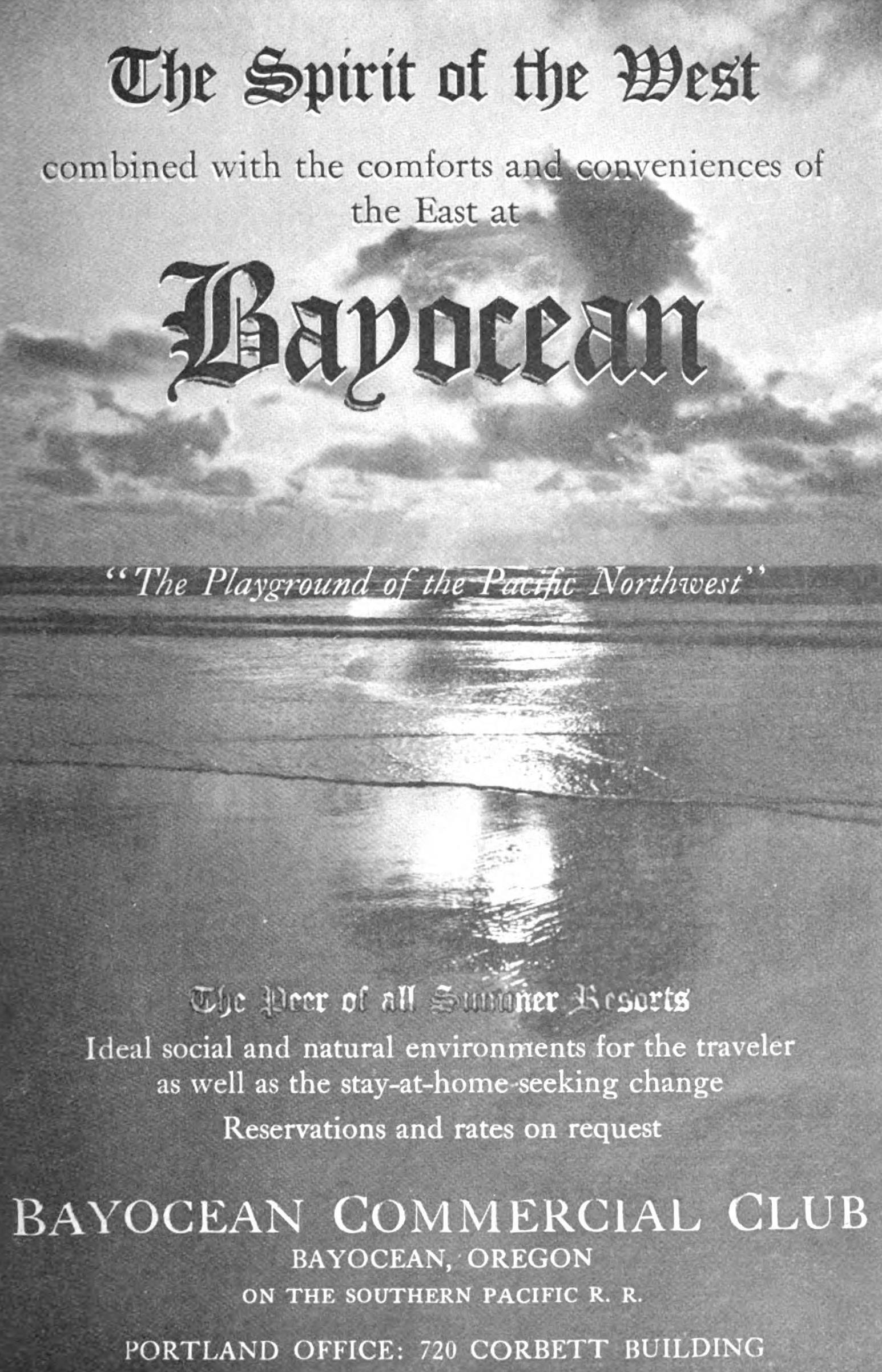
"The Spirit of the West combined with the comforts and conveniences of the East at Bayocean" "The Playground of the Pacific Northwest" 1913 ad, Sunset Magazine vol. 31

Bayocean was a community in Tillamook County, Oregon, United States. Sometimes known as "the town that fell into the sea", it was a planned resort community founded in 1906 on Tillamook Spit, a small stretch of land that forms one wall of Tillamook Bay.

Bayocean's post office was established on February 4, 1909, and by 1914, the town's population was 2,000. Only a few decades later however, Bayocean had become a ghost town, having had many of its attractions destroyed by "man-induced" coastal erosion. The town's unforeseen destruction is believed by many to have been caused by the residents themselves.

== Development ==
The location of Bayocean was said to have been discovered by co-founder Thomas Irving Potter while sight-seeing and hunting along the Oregon Coast. It was called by both T. I. Potter and his father/business partner Thomas Benton Potter, who envisioned the venture as the "Atlantic City of the West".

Believing the site to have an exceptional view of both Tillamook Bay and the Pacific Ocean, the new town's name was logically derived from both.

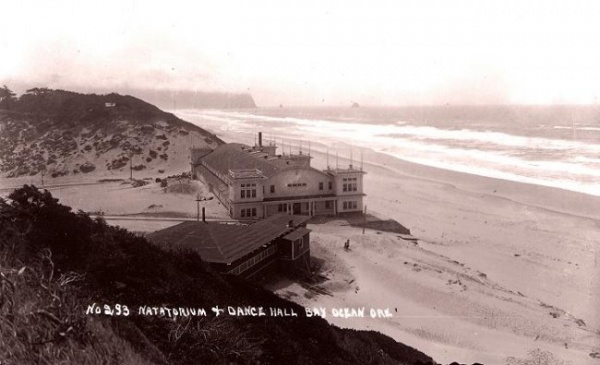
The dance hall (foreground) and natatorium once located in Bayocean

Bayocean had many features uncommon for a small town of its time, including a dance hall, a hotel with orchestra, a 1000-seat movie theater, a shooting range, a bowling alley, tennis courts, a rail system and four miles of paved streets.

One notable attraction was a heated natatorium, complete with a wave generator and a special section for a band to play music to entertain the swimmers.

While Bayocean's economy was based on tourism, there were other businesses in town, including a cannery, a tin shop, a machine shop, and a Texaco gas station.

In a time when many other towns did not have technological infrastructure like electricity or paved roads, Bayocean hosted a water system, a telephone system and a diesel-driven power plant.

== Decline ==
Despite having paved roads, Bayocean was not connected to the rest of the country until the 1920s. Most residents and tourists arrived to the town via T. B. Potter's steamship, the S.S. Bayocean, in a three-day trip from Portland.

The final leg of the journey, entering into the unprotected mouth of Tillamook Bay, could provide a rough and frightening experience to passengers. Eventually Bayocean's residents asked the Army Corps of Engineers for a protective jetty to reduce the waves. The Army Corps of Engineers studied the location and suggested that two jetties be built, one on each side of the bay's mouth, at an estimated cost of $2.2 million. Half of that amount was required to come from local residents. With the multimillion-dollar price considered unaffordable, Bayocean's residents proposed and eventually had a single jetty constructed. The price was a little over $800,000 with Bayocean's citizens paying half. Although the new single jetty made for a much smoother journey into the bay, the one-sided change to the coastline began a process of erosion to Bayocean's beaches, slowly narrowing them before overtaking them completely.

In 1932, waves from a massive storm finally crossed the beach and destroyed the huge natatorium. The spit itself was further damaged by winter storms in 1939, 1942, 1948, and by 1952 what was left of Bayocean had become an island.

Bayocean's post office closed in 1953. What little remained of the town was demolished during the reclamation and dike-building project of 1956.

In 1960, Bayocean's last house was washed away, and in 1971, the last remaining building, a garage, finally fell into the ocean.

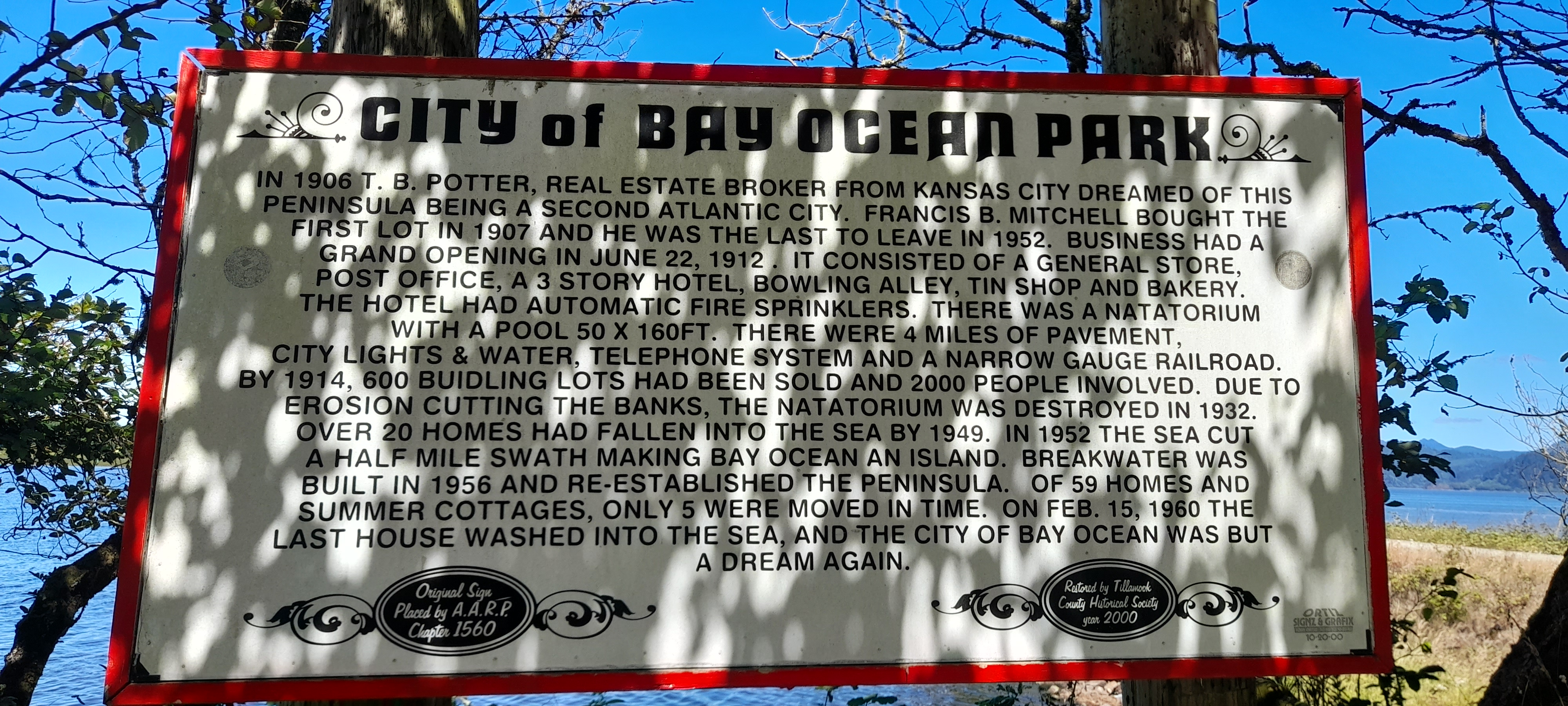
Sign at the entrance to Bayocean Dike Road

== Legacy ==
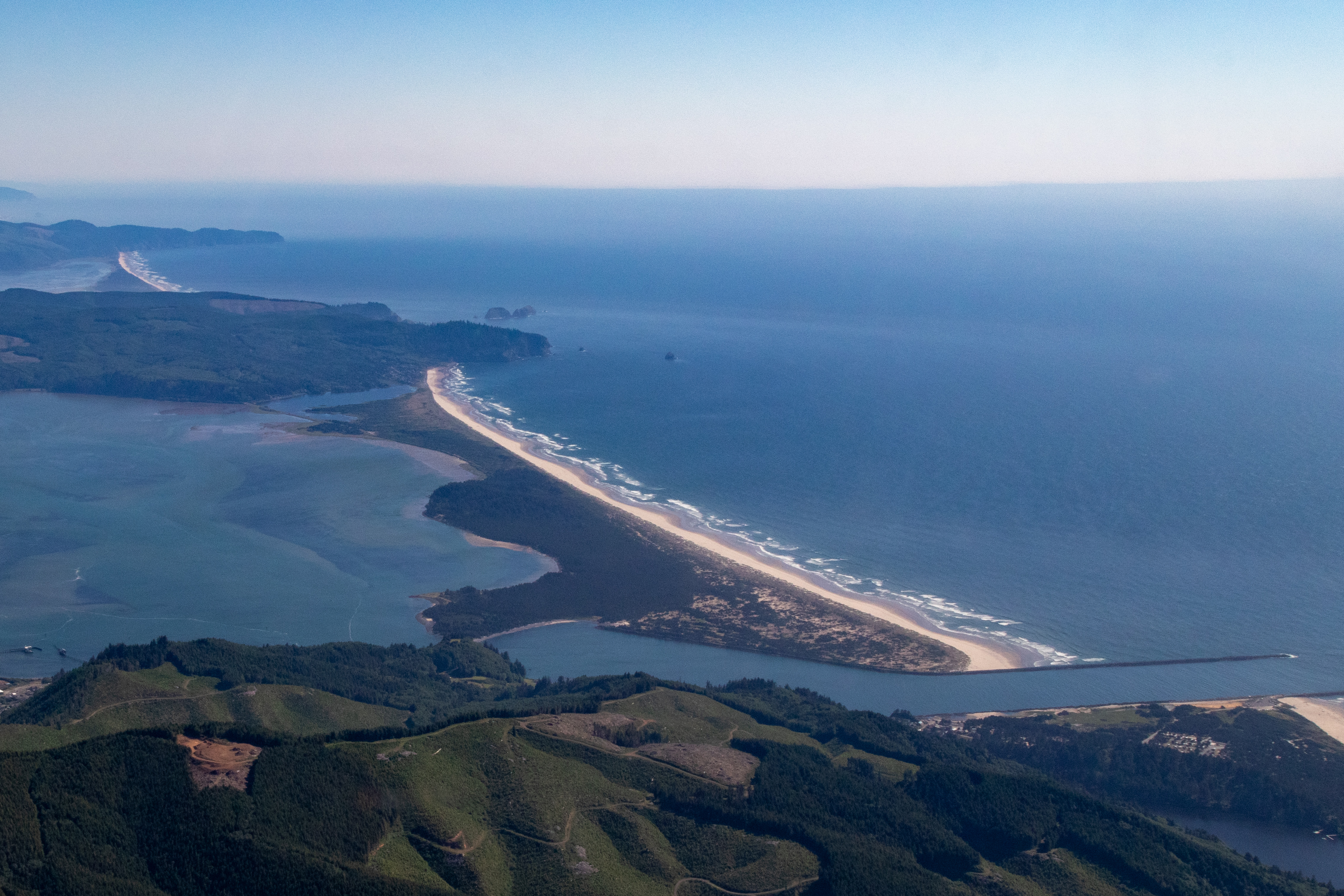
Bayocean in 2022

With the addition of a second jetty built in the 1970s, sand began to re-accumulate on the spit. The site is now the location of Bayocean Peninsula County Park and virtually all traces of the town are gone. All that remains of Bayocean is a commemorative sign at the south end of the park.

A sandy 7.8 mile hiking loop around the perimeter of the peninsula upon which Bayocean was located is maintained today. This trail begins and ends at the parking lot of Bayocean Peninsula Park. From March through September hikers must walk on wet sand on the beach due to restrictions protecting the nesting habitat of snowy plover in the dry sand and dunes.
