= Eureka Bar, Oregon =

- Unincorporated community
- Location within Oregon Location within the United States
- Coordinates: 45.818523°N 116.769054°W
- Country: United States
- State: Oregon
- County: Wallowa
- Established: 1903
- Elevation: 932 ft (284 m)

Eureka Bar is a former town located in Wallowa County, Oregon, United States, which was formed at the confluence of the Imnaha and Snake Rivers in 1903. The town came into being due to local copper mining operations. It included a smelting tower 13 stories tall, a hotel, and a warehouse were constructed in 1903.

A post office operated in Eureka Bar in 1903. A Wallowa County mail delivery man, W.K. Stubblefield, recounted that he had received the contract to carry mail to the town, but that the first time he arrived, the town was empty. After repeated deliveries of mail were met with no residents in the ensuing months, mail operations ceased.

As of 2015, the foundations of the town's buildings remain. The ruins are not accessible by road, with roads only reaching within a 4 miles (6.4 km) radius of the former town.
