= Bellflower, Illinois =

- Village
- Location in McLean County, Illinois
- Coordinates: 40°20′25″N 88°31′33″W
- Country: United States
- State: Illinois
- County: McLean
- Township: Bellflower

Area
  - Total: 0.36 sq mi (0.93 km^{2})
  - Land: 0.36 sq mi (0.93 km^{2})
  - Water: 0 sq mi (0.00 km^{2})
- Elevation: 787 ft (240 m)

Population (2020)
  - Total: 346
  - Density: 959.7/sq mi (370.56/km^{2})
- Time zone: UTC-6 (CST)
  - Summer (DST): UTC-5 (CDT)
- ZIP code: 61724
- Area code: 309
- FIPS code: 17-04897
- GNIS ID: 2398081
- Website: villageofbellflower.org

Bellflower is a village in McLean County, Illinois, United States. The population was 346 at the 2020 census. It is part of the Bloomington–Normal Metropolitan Statistical Area.

== History ==
=== Founding ===
Bellflower was laid out on August 26, 1871, by George Nelson Black (March 15, 1833 – April 22, 1908) and his wife Louisa J. Black (December 22, 1840 – December 23, 1909). George was born in Berkshire County, Massachusetts, and had come to Springfield, Illinois, in 1850, where he became wealthy through manufacturing, mining, and railroads. Bellflower Township had subscribed $30,000 in twenty-year bonds toward the construction of what was then called the Gilman, Clinton and Springfield Railroad. A condition of the funding was that the township would have a station on the railroad. Black purchased 100 acres (0.40 km^{2}) of land, laid 40 acres (160,000 m^{2}) out into town lots and then transferred the title to the railroad. When the railroad became property of the Illinois Central Railroad, town lots in Bellflower were not transferred to that railroad. The name of the town came from the name of the township and was selected by Jesse Richards, who was particularly fond of the Bellflower apple. It is perhaps the only town in Illinois named for an apple. In the 1870s it was often spelled "Belle Flower" or "Belle-Flower".

=== Original plan and growth ===
The original plan of the town consisted of two square blocks of land. Most of the western square was divided into sixteen blocks, each usually containing twelve lots, and this part of the town was split diagonally by the 100-foot-wide (30 m) path of the railroad. Unlike many towns found in the 1870s, there was no depot ground. The eastern square of land and a strip along the north edge of the western square was divided into out lots, each of which were several times the size the lots in the western square. The combination of in lots and out lots was fairly common in central Illinois and may be found, for example, at Hudson and Chenoa. The small triangle of land cut off by the railroad from the remainder of block ten became the location of the town jail. The station was located on the south side of the tracks, and the two early elevators were on railroad land. By 1895 both in lots and out lots held residences. R. E. Moreland established the first business. Bellflower quickly became a major grain shipping center serving the fertile surrounding land. By 1879 it was shipping over 350,000 bushels of grain a year. In 1900 the population was 356, nearly the same as today.

== Geography ==
Bellflower is in southeastern McLean County, along Illinois Route 54, which leads southwest 9 miles (14 km) to Farmer City and northeast 12 miles (19 km) to Gibson City. Bloomington, the McLean county seat, is 30 miles (48 km) to the northwest, while Champaign is 26 miles (42 km) to the southeast.

According to the U.S. Census Bureau, Bellflower has a total area of 0.36 square miles (0.93 km^{2}), all land. The village drains southeast to tributaries of Lone Tree Creek, a northeast-flowing tributary of the Sangamon River and part of the Illinois River watershed.

Students from Bellflower attend the Blue Ridge School District.

== Demographics ==
Historical population
Census	Pop.	Note	%±
1900	356		—
1910	394		10.7%
1920	441		11.9%
1930	442		0.2%
1940	425		−3.8%
1950	413		−2.8%
1960	389		−5.8%
1970	400		2.8%
1980	421		5.3%
1990	405		−3.8%
2000	408		0.7%
2010	357		−12.5%
2020	346		−3.1%
Decennial US Census

As of the census of 2000, there were 408 people, 162 households, and 117 families residing in the village. The population density was 1,118.1 inhabitants per square mile (431.7/km^{2}). There were 171 housing units at an average density of 468.6 per square mile (180.9/km^{2}). The racial makeup of the village was 100.00% White.

There were 162 households, out of which 32.1% had children under the age of 18 living with them, 63.6% were married couples living together, 6.2% had a female householder with no husband present, and 27.2% were non-families. 24.7% of all households were made up of individuals, and 14.8% had someone living alone who was 65 years of age or older. The average household size was 2.52 and the average family size was 3.01.

In the village, the population was spread out, with 24.8% under the age of 18, 7.8% from 18 to 24, 28.2% from 25 to 44, 23.3% from 45 to 64, and 15.9% who were 65 years of age or older. The median age was 39 years. For every 100 females, there were 96.2 males. For every 100 females age 18 and over, there were 93.1 males.

The median income for a household in the village was $41,442, and the median income for a family was $45,625. Males had a median income of $34,375 versus $28,250 for females. The per capita income for the village was $16,200. None of the families and 0.5% of the population were living below the poverty line, including no under eighteens and 3.8% of those over 64.

== Notable people ==
- Harry Cassady, outfielder for the Pittsburgh Pirates and Washington Senators

== Events ==
The Bellflower Country Opry, located at the Bellflower Community Center, is a monthly show which features music, skits, raffles, prizes, and a fundraiser dinner for local organizations.
