= Ortley (apple) =

Apple cultivar

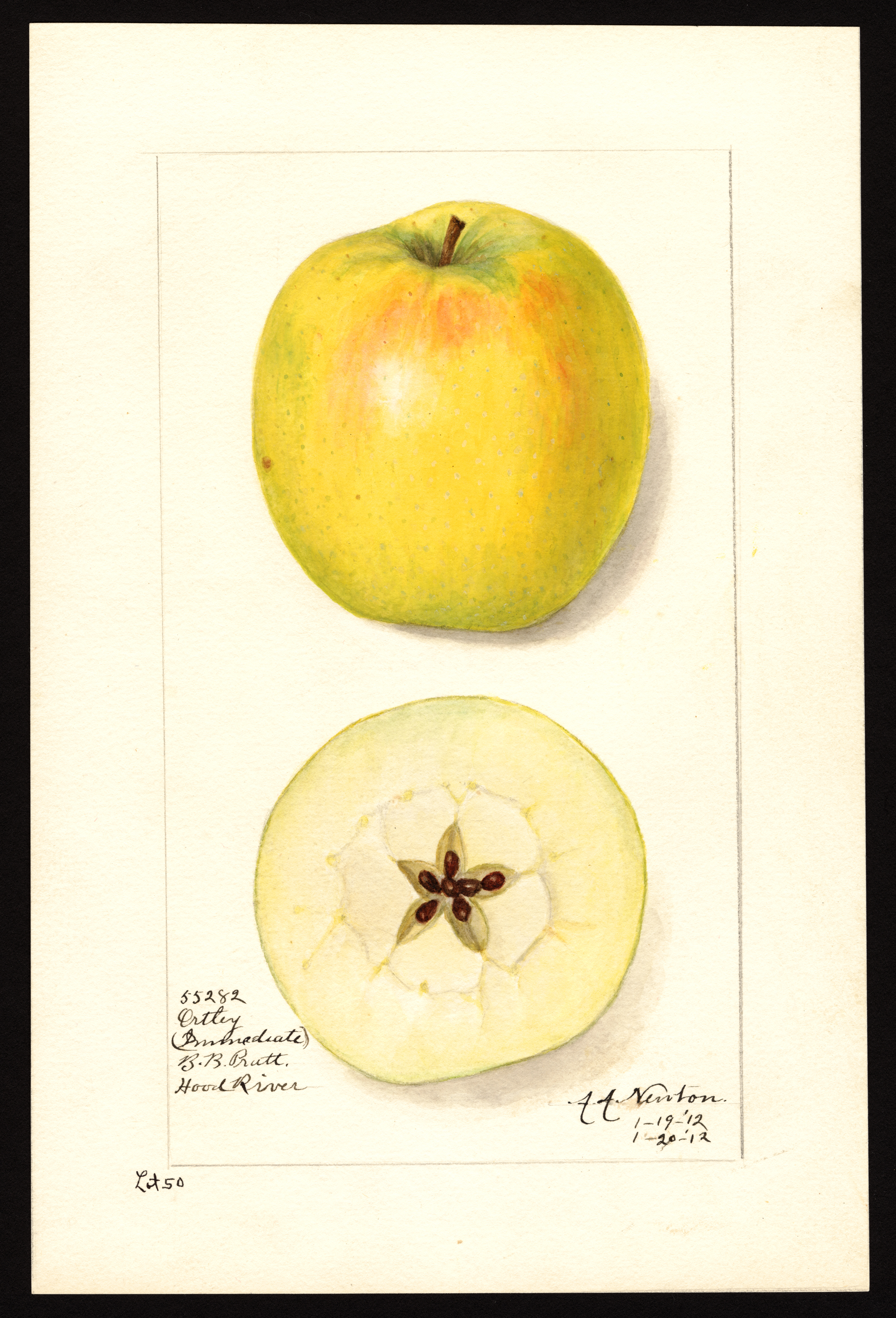
- Cultivar: Ortley
- Origin: New Jersey, United States, before 1817

Ortley is a cultivar of domesticated apple that originated in New Jersey. It has many other names including "Cleopatra" and "Jersey Greening". The fruit is similar to the Yellow Bellflower.
