= Bellflower apple =

Apple cultivar

Malus 'Yellow Bellflower'
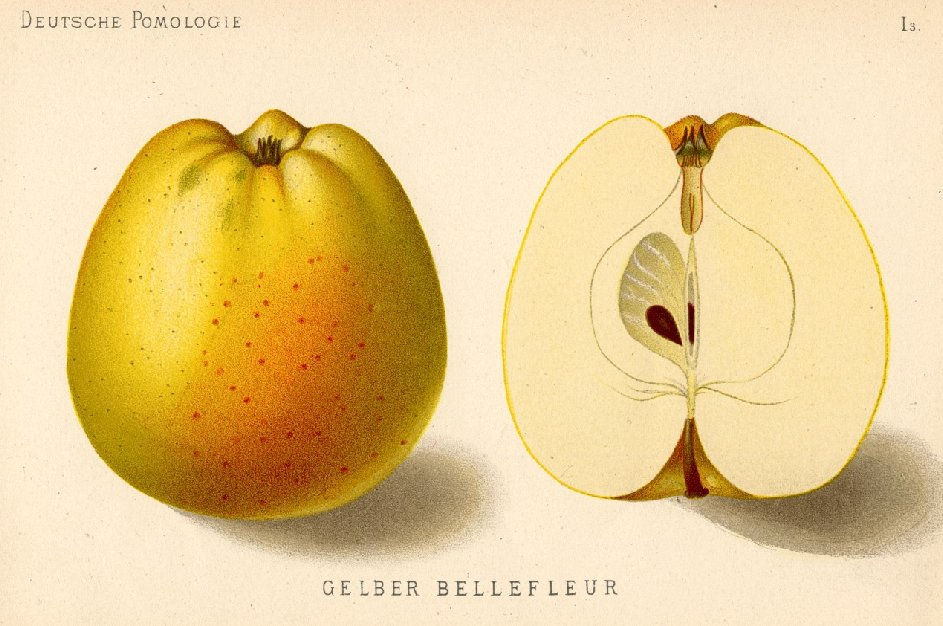
- Illustration of Yellow Bellflower from 1883
- Genus: Malus
- Cultivar group: Yellow Bellflower group
- Marketing names: Bellflower, Bell Flower, Belle, Bellefleur, Belle Flavoise, Lincoln Pippin, Linnoeus Pippin
- Origin: near Crosswicks, New Jersey

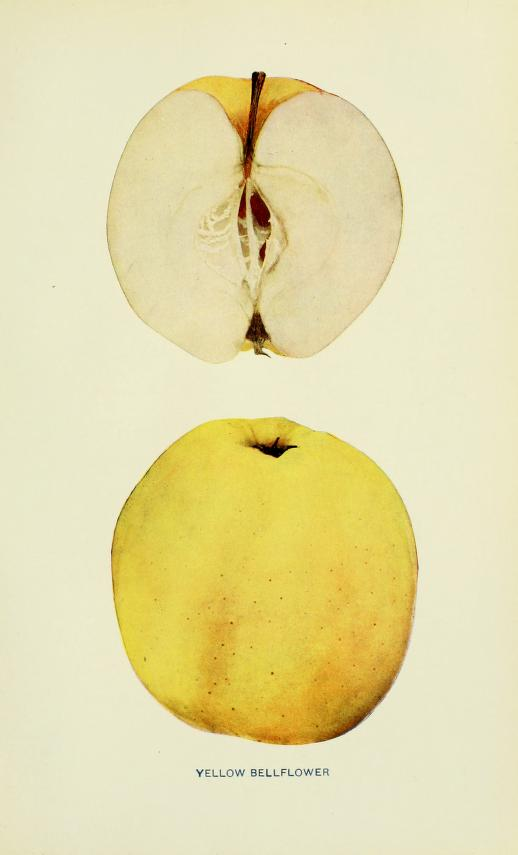
Two Yellow Bellflower apples from the 1905 Apples of New York

Yellow Bellflower is a cultivar of domesticated apple that originated in New Jersey. It has many other names including "Belle Flavoise" and "Lincoln Pippin". It is probably the best known of a group of apple cultivars referred to as the yellow bellflower group, with fruit that are generally elongated, with largely yellow skin. Along with the Yellow Bellflower, the Ortley is the oldest of the group.

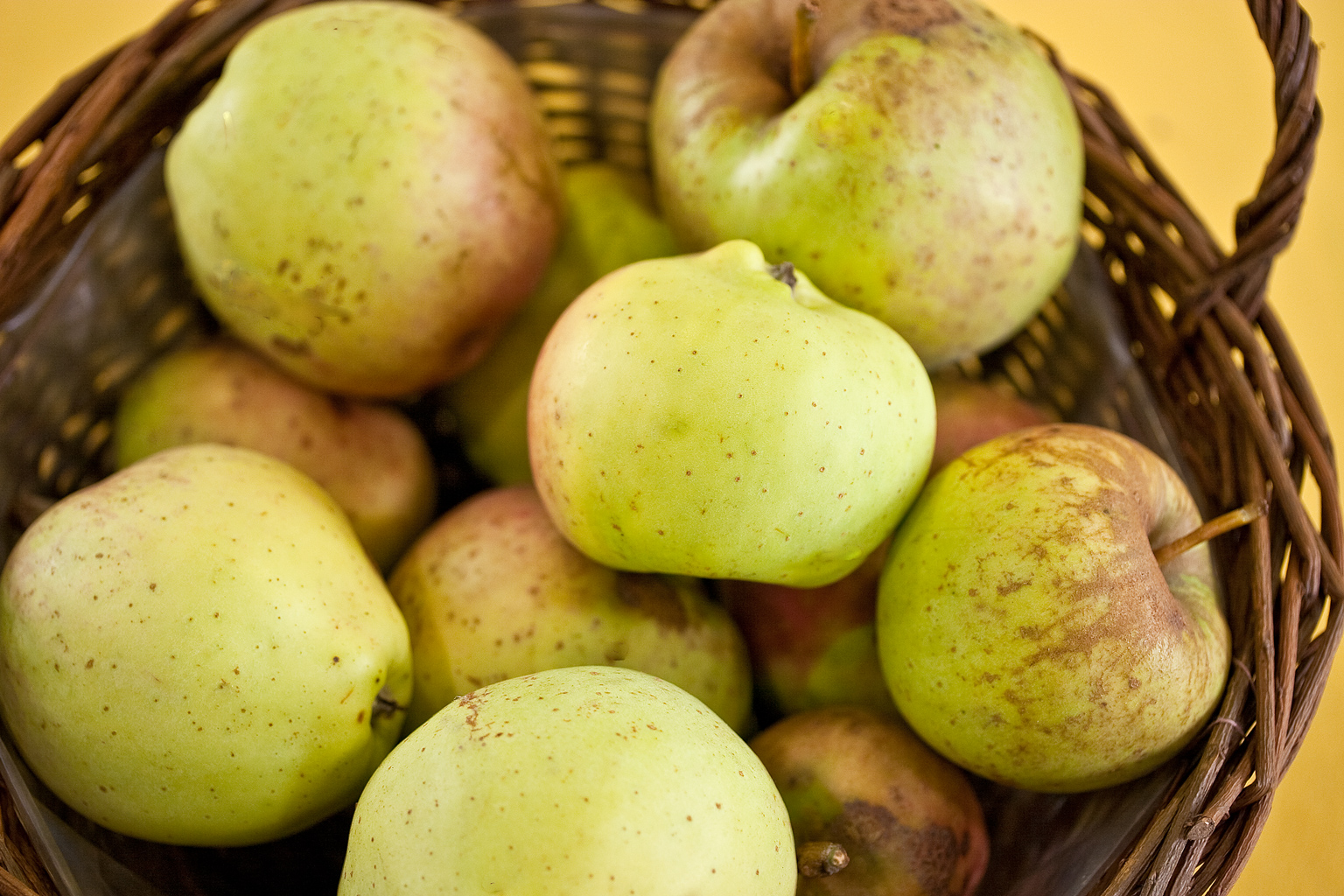
Yellow Bellflower

== Chemical composition ==
Sugar 11.3%, acid 0.56%, pectine 0.43%

== See also ==
- Bellflower, California, named after the apple
- Bellflower, Illinois, named after the apple
