= Sherar =

Sherar is a surname. Notable people with the surname include:

- Joseph Sherar (1833–1908), 19th-century wagon road builder
- Keeley Sherar (born 2003), Australian rules footballer
- Zoe Sherar (born 1999), Canadian sprinter

== See also ==
- Sherars Falls, waterfall in Oregon
- Sherrer, surname
