= Oregon Route 293 =

State highway in northern Oregon, US

Oregon Route 293
- Route 293 highlighted in red

Route information
- Maintained by ODOT
- Length: 13.58 mi (21.85 km)
- Existed: May 14, 2002–present

Major junctions
- West end: US 97 near Willowdale
- East end: OR 218 in Antelope

Location
- Country: United States
- State: Oregon
- Counties: Jefferson, Wasco

Highway system
- Oregon Highways; Interstate; US; State; Named; Scenic
← OR 282	→ OR 331

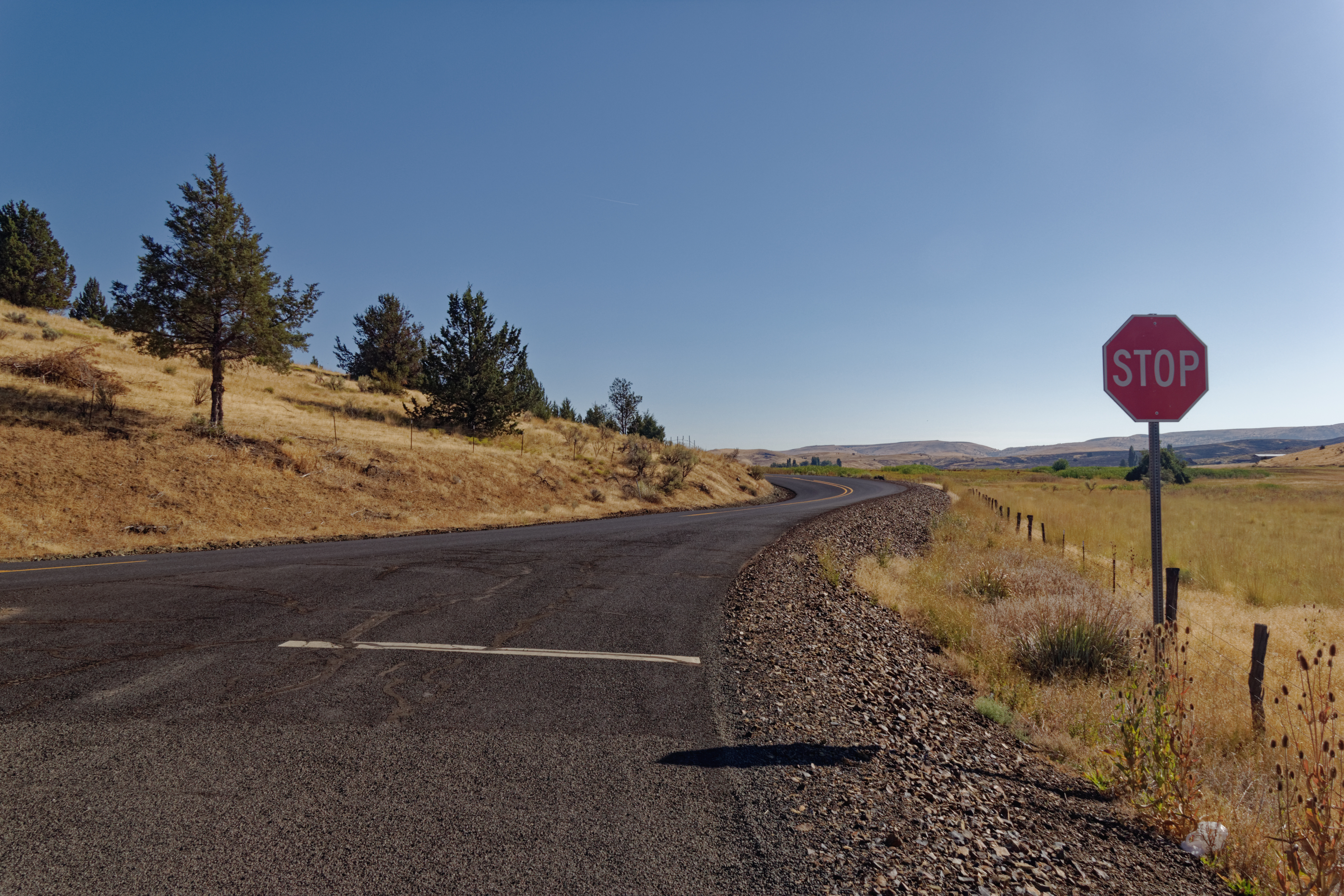
Halfway between US 97 and Antelope

Oregon Route 293 is a state highway located in the north-central part of the U.S. state of Oregon. Stretching from Willowdale to Antelope, it is known as the Antelope Highway No. 293 (see Oregon highways and routes).

Oregon Route 293 is an east–west highway despite having an odd number. It was not initially signed as a state highway until at least the 1990s. There is speculation that Oregon Route 293 signs were posted in error, as OR 293 has always been the internal highway number used by the Oregon Department of Transportation (ODOT). However, in 2002, ODOT revised its policy to allow for the signage of otherwise unnumbered state highways, resulting in the official establishment of Oregon Route 293. It primarily serves the purpose of connecting the rural areas of Wheeler and Gilliam counties to the Bend metropolitan area. The majority of the route is situated within Wasco County, with a small portion extending into Jefferson County.

== History ==
On October 10, 1963, there was agreement with the Oregon State Highway Commission and Wasco County to turn the Wasco County section of the Antelope Highway into a state-maintained road. The section in Jefferson County was turned into a state-maintained road on September 8, 1971. In the Oregon Transportation Commission meeting on May 14, 2002, the commission approved the OR 293 designation to be placed on the Antelope Highway.

== Major intersections ==
County	Location	mi	km	Destinations	Notes
Jefferson		0.00	0.00	US 97 – Madras, Shaniko, Maupin	
Wasco	Antelope	13.58	21.85	OR 218 – Shaniko, Clarno, Fossil	
1.000 mi = 1.609 km; 1.000 km = 0.621 mi
