= Journey Through Time Scenic Byway =

Route information
- Maintained by ODOT
- Length: 286 mi (460 km)
- Existed: February 19, 1997–present

Major junctions
- West end: I-84 / US 97 in Biggs Junction
- East end: OR 7 / I-84 in Baker City

Location
- Country: United States
- State: Oregon
- Counties: Sherman, Wasco, Wheeler, Grant, Baker

Highway system
- Scenic Byways; National; National Forest; BLM; NPS; Oregon Highways; Interstate; US; State; Named; Scenic

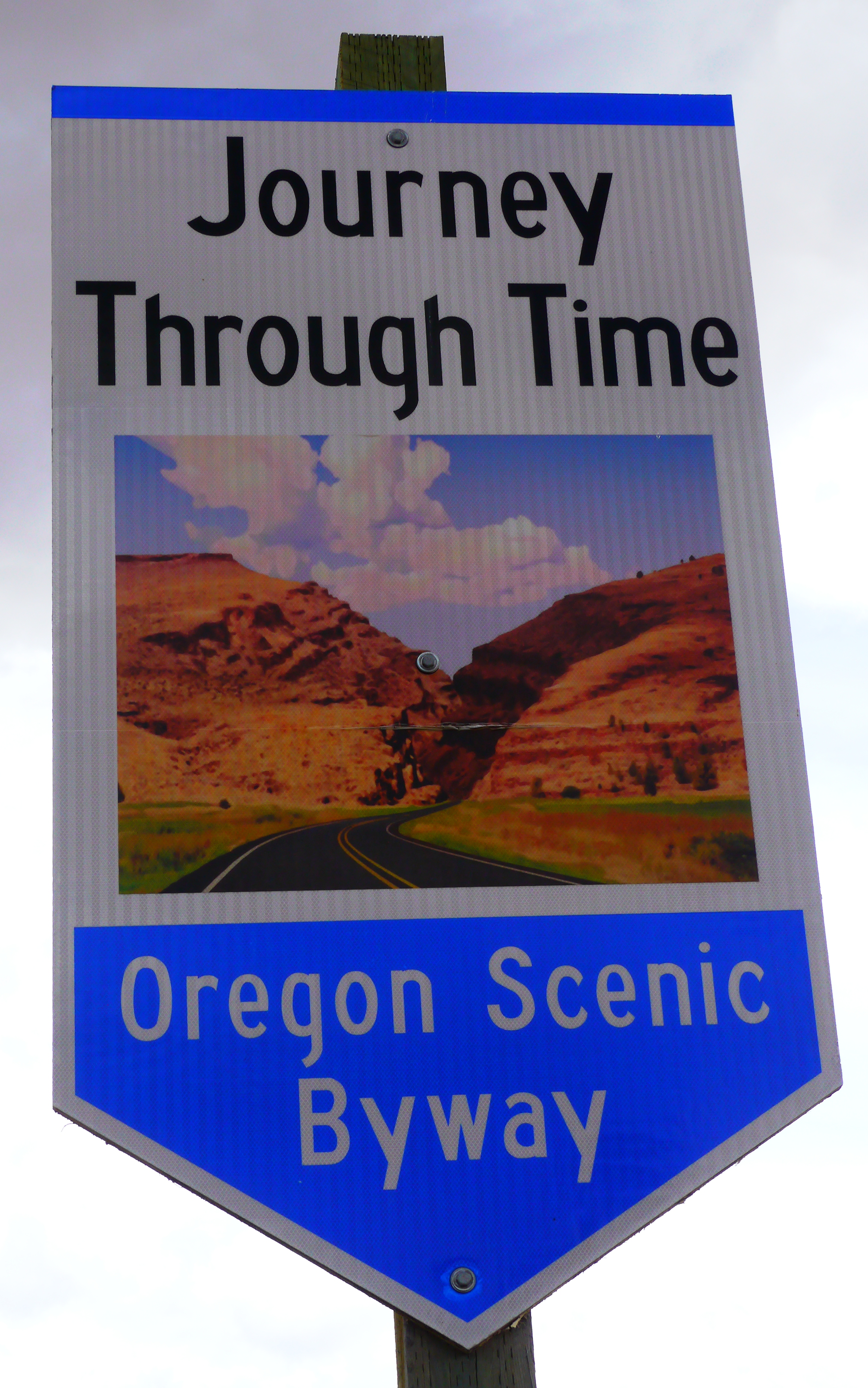
Byway sign near Dayville

Journey Through Time Scenic Byway is a scenic byway in the U.S. state of Oregon. It spans five Oregon counties and comprises portions of U.S. Route 97, Oregon Route 218, Oregon Route 19, U.S. Route 26, and Oregon Route 7. The John Day River meanders through much of its route. The byway offers glimpses into the geologic and pioneer history of Oregon. It passes near the John Day Fossil Beds National Monument, including its Painted Hills unit.

== Route description ==
From Biggs, the byway follows U.S. 97 south through Shaniko to Antelope, then turns east on OR 218 to Fossil. The John Day Fossil Beds National Monument is nearby. From Fossil the byway continues on OR 19, turns southward near Kimberly, and goes generally eastward again on U.S. 26. On U.S. 26 it passes through the communities of Dayville, Mount Vernon, John Day, and Prairie City. At Austin Junction it continues on OR 7 eastward to Baker City.

== History ==
The Journey Through Time Scenic Byway was designated as an Oregon State Scenic Byway on February 19, 1997.
