= Bakeoven, Oregon =

Unincorporated community in the state of Oregon, United States

- Unincorporated community
- Location within the state of Oregon Bakeoven, Oregon (the United States)
- Coordinates: 45°05′11″N 120°50′23″W
- Country: United States
- State: Oregon
- County: Wasco
- Elevation: 2,667 ft (813 m)
- Time zone: UTC-8 (PST)
  - Summer (DST): UTC-7 (PDT)
- Area code: 541
- GNIS feature ID: 1136023

Bakeoven is an unincorporated community in Wasco County, in the U.S. state of Oregon. It is southeast of Maupin and northwest of Shaniko along Bakeoven Creek, a tributary of the Deschutes River.

Bakeoven was named for a clay and stone oven built in 1862 to make bread to sell to miners traveling along a trail from The Dalles to gold mines near Canyon City. The baker was said to have been a trader with a pack train of flour whose horses were driven off in the night by Native Americans. Joseph Sherar, another pioneer and businessman, is thought to have been at the scene at the time of the incident.

In 1905, the community, at the intersection of two stagecoach roads, had a post office, a hotel, general merchandise store, and a blacksmith shop. The Prineville road and the Canyon City road merged here and continued as one road to The Dalles. The Dalles – Canyon City road was later included in the land-grant route known as The Dalles Military Road.

A Bake Oven (two words) post office was established in 1875, and Ellen Burgess was the first postmaster. This office was discontinued in 1913, and for about a year the Bakeoven mail was handled by a nearby post office named Flangan. The Bakeoven (one word) post office was reopened in 1914 but closed again in 1918.
