= Antelope, Oregon =

- City
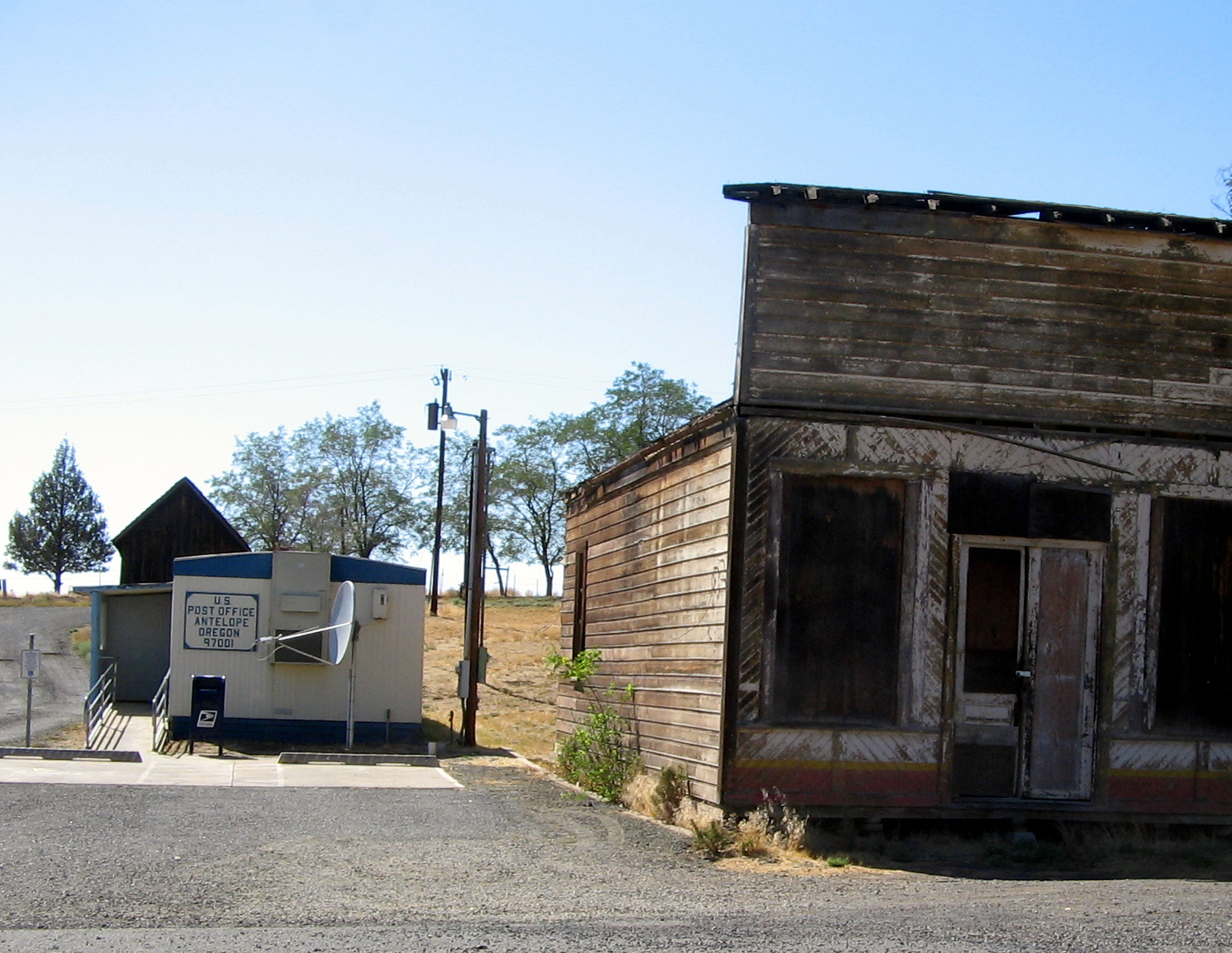
- Post office and abandoned building in Antelope

- Location in Oregon
- Coordinates: 44°54′41″N 120°43′25″W
- Country: United States
- State: Oregon
- County: Wasco
- Incorporated: 1901

Government
  - Mayor: Rodney Shanks

Area
  - Total: 0.46 sq mi (1.19 km^{2})
  - Land: 0.46 sq mi (1.19 km^{2})
  - Water: 0 sq mi (0.00 km^{2})
- Elevation: 2,667 ft (813 m)

Population (2020)
  - Total: 37
  - Density: 80.2/sq mi (30.96/km^{2})
- Time zone: UTC-8 (Pacific)
  - Summer (DST): UTC-7 (Pacific)
- ZIP code: 97001
- Area code: 541
- FIPS code: 41-02250
- GNIS feature ID: 2409714
- Website: cityofantelope.us

Antelope (known as Rajneesh from 1984 to 1986) is a city in rural Wasco County, Oregon, United States. As of the 2020 census, Antelope had a population of 37.

The city was established in 1872 at a stage and freight wagon road stop on the old Dalles to Canyon City Trail. It was incorporated as the City of Antelope in 1901.

In the early 1980s, hundreds of members of the Rajneesh movement moved in and built a small city in previously unoccupied land they purchased. The Rajneeshees effectively took over the government of the city by outnumbering the original residents with new voter registrations. On September 18, 1984, a vote was held, and the city was renamed Rajneesh, Oregon. By 1985, after several of the Rajneesh movement leaders were discovered to have been involved in criminal behavior (including a mass food poisoning attack and an aborted plot to assassinate a U.S. Attorney), leader Rajneesh left the country as part of a plea deal for federal immigration fraud charges, and the Rajneesh commune collapsed. On November 6, 1985, the remaining residents of the city, which included both original residents and some remaining Rajneeshees, voted 34 to 0 to revert to the name Antelope.

== History ==
The Antelope Valley was probably named by European-American members of Joseph Sherar's party, who were packing supplies to mines in the John Day area. Sherar became known as the operator of a toll bridge across the Deschutes River, on a cut-off of the Barlow Road. In the early 19th century, the area supported many pronghorns, which are not true antelopes, but are often called "pronghorn antelopes".

=== 19th century beginnings ===
In the mid-19th century, Antelope began as a station along the wagon road connecting The Dalles on the Columbia River with gold mines near Canyon City. After about 1870, the wagon road became known as The Dalles Military Road. The road crossed the Deschutes River on Sherar's Bridge.

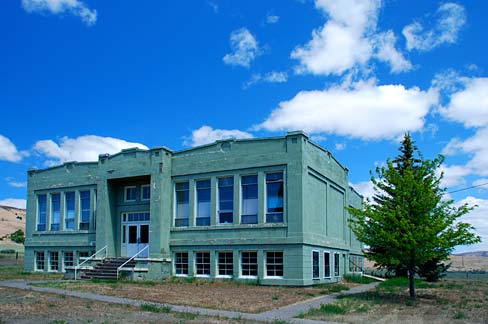
The historic Antelope School building, which currently houses municipal offices and various community functions including the annual harvest dinner event

The Antelope post office was established in 1871, with Howard Maupin, founder of Maupin, Oregon, as the first postmaster. The town's population peaked around 1900, shortly after the Columbia Southern Railway completed a 70-mile (110 km) rail line from Biggs, on the Columbia River, to Shaniko, a few miles north of Antelope. The railroad timetable for September 9, 1900, lists a daily stagecoach run from the train terminal in Shaniko to Antelope and beyond. Antelope was incorporated by the Oregon Legislative Assembly on January 29, 1901.

=== Rajneesh movement ===
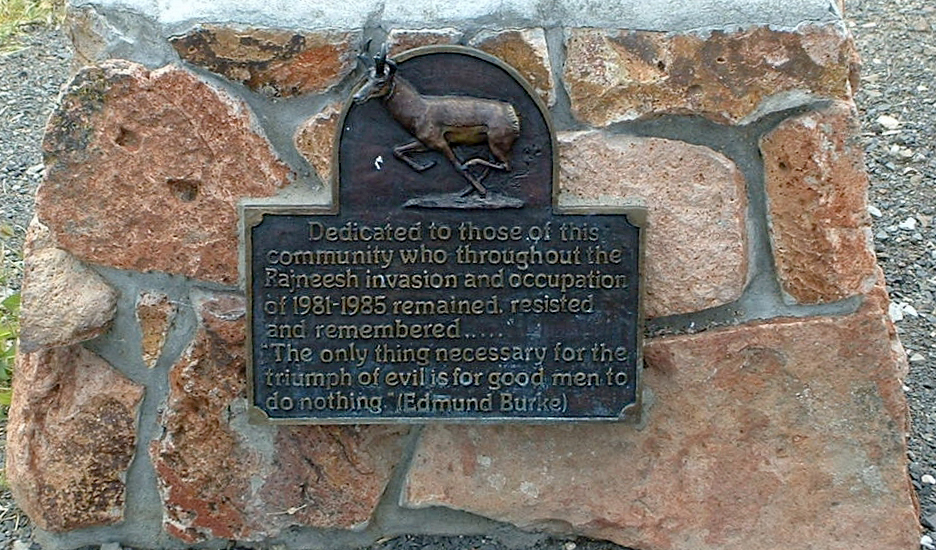
A plaque at the Antelope post office commemorates local resistance to the Rajneeshee movement

Rajneeshpuram, a farming and meditation commune founded by the Rajneesh movement, followers of Bhagwan Shri Rajneesh, was established near the town in 1981. The town attempted to disincorporate in April 1982 to avoid a takeover by the Rajneesh followers, who registered to vote in Antelope en masse and rejected the measure. The Rajneeshees gained a majority on the town council following the November 1982 elections and resignation of two other members. On September 18, 1984, the city was renamed "Rajneesh".

The organization collapsed in 1985 following the discovery by the authorities of criminal activities, such as a bioterror attack a year prior that exposed non-Rajneeshees in Wasco County to salmonella to prevent them from voting. On November 6, 1985, the remaining residents, which included both original residents and some remaining Rajneeshees, voted 34 to 0 to restore the original name, and it was subsequently restored in 1986. The U.S. Postal Service had never recognized the change of name.

Subsequent to the collapse of the commune, the property reverted to ownership by the State of Oregon for non-payment of taxes, and was sold to Montana billionaire Dennis Washington in 1991 for $3.65 million. Currently, the ranch, 18 miles (29 km) from Antelope, is operated by Young Life, a Christian parachurch organization, as a Christian youth camp known as "Washington Family Ranch".

The events of the mid-1980s that involved the Rajneesh group were the subject of the 2003 Forensic Files TV series episode "Bio Attack", and the 2018 Netflix documentary Wild Wild Country.

== Geography ==
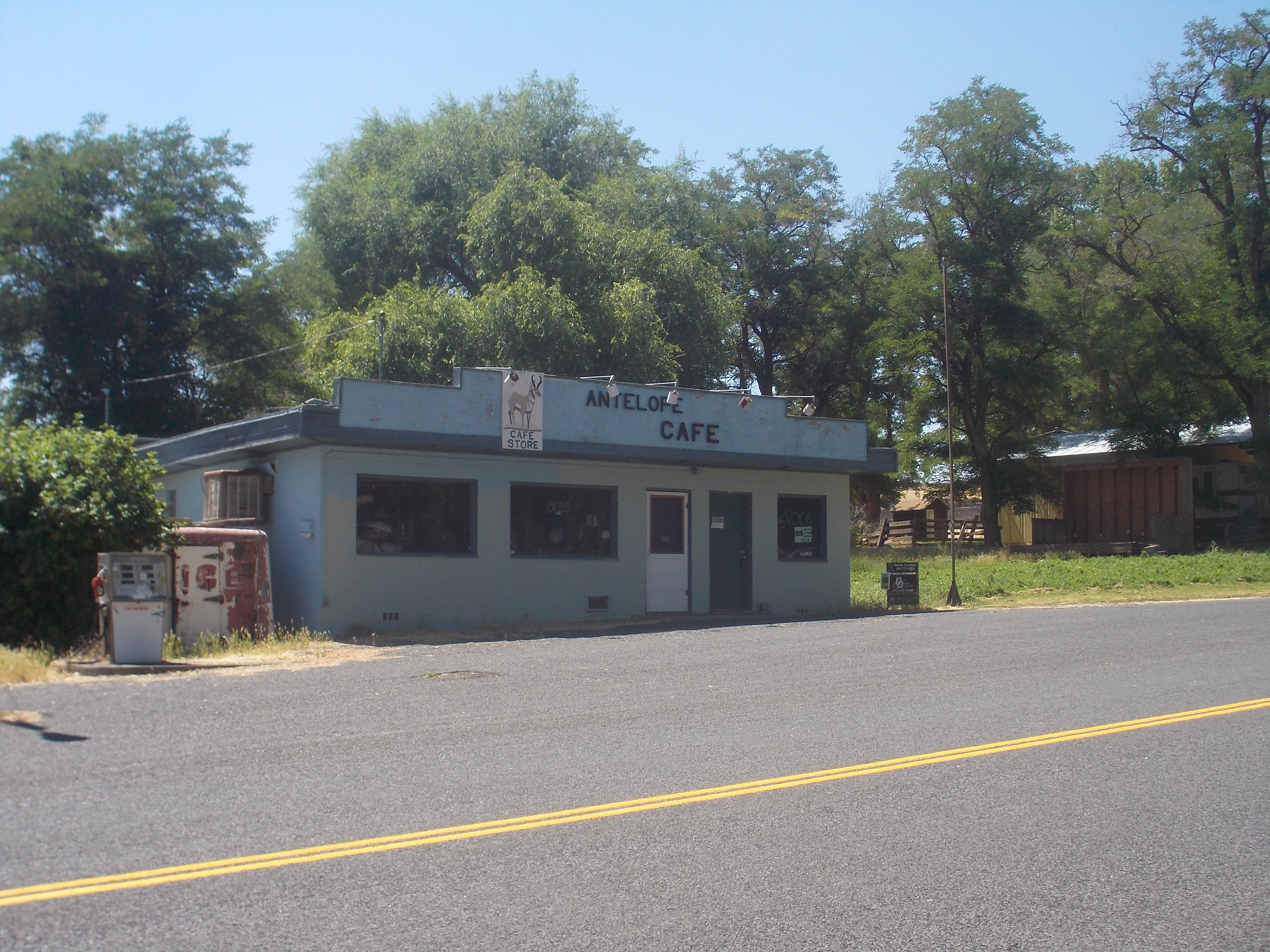
The closed Antelope Café

Antelope, in Wasco County in north-central Oregon, is along Oregon Route 218 just north of its intersection with Oregon Route 293. By highway, the city is 34 miles (55 km) northeast of Madras and 143 miles (230 km) east of Portland. Antelope Creek, in the Deschutes River watershed, flows by Antelope.

The city is 2,654 feet (809 m) above sea level. According to the United States Census Bureau, the city has a total area of 0.48 square miles (1.24 km^{2}), all of it land.

=== Climate ===
According to the Köppen climate classification system, Antelope has a warm-summer Mediterranean climate (Köppen Csa).

Climate data for Antelope, Oregon, 1991–2020 normals, extremes 1924–present
Month	Jan	Feb	Mar	Apr	May	Jun	Jul	Aug	Sep	Oct	Nov	Dec	Year
Record high °F (°C)	70 (21)	72 (22)	78 (26)	90 (32)	98 (37)	108 (42)	107 (42)	109 (43)	101 (38)	91 (33)	76 (24)	72 (22)	109 (43)
Mean maximum °F (°C)	57.6 (14.2)	59.1 (15.1)	66.1 (18.9)	75.5 (24.2)	84.4 (29.1)	91.7 (33.2)	98.8 (37.1)	98.3 (36.8)	92.6 (33.7)	79.9 (26.6)	65.1 (18.4)	56.0 (13.3)	100.4 (38.0)
Mean daily maximum °F (°C)	42.9 (6.1)	46.1 (7.8)	52.8 (11.6)	58.7 (14.8)	68.4 (20.2)	75.7 (24.3)	87.3 (30.7)	86.5 (30.3)	78.2 (25.7)	63.5 (17.5)	49.7 (9.8)	41.6 (5.3)	62.6 (17.0)
Daily mean °F (°C)	34.2 (1.2)	36.2 (2.3)	41.1 (5.1)	45.6 (7.6)	53.6 (12.0)	60.2 (15.7)	68.9 (20.5)	68.3 (20.2)	61.2 (16.2)	49.8 (9.9)	39.5 (4.2)	32.7 (0.4)	49.3 (9.6)
Mean daily minimum °F (°C)	25.6 (−3.6)	26.2 (−3.2)	29.4 (−1.4)	32.5 (0.3)	38.9 (3.8)	44.6 (7.0)	50.5 (10.3)	50.1 (10.1)	44.1 (6.7)	36.0 (2.2)	29.3 (−1.5)	23.8 (−4.6)	35.9 (2.2)
Mean minimum °F (°C)	10.1 (−12.2)	11.2 (−11.6)	18.6 (−7.4)	22.3 (−5.4)	27.1 (−2.7)	33.8 (1.0)	40.2 (4.6)	39.6 (4.2)	32.3 (0.2)	22.8 (−5.1)	14.6 (−9.7)	8.0 (−13.3)	0.5 (−17.5)
Record low °F (°C)	−27 (−33)	−22 (−30)	5 (−15)	11 (−12)	13 (−11)	25 (−4)	29 (−2)	30 (−1)	20 (−7)	8 (−13)	−7 (−22)	−20 (−29)	−27 (−33)
Average precipitation inches (mm)	1.50 (38)	1.29 (33)	1.22 (31)	1.52 (39)	1.99 (51)	1.04 (26)	0.34 (8.6)	0.34 (8.6)	0.50 (13)	1.23 (31)	1.76 (45)	1.81 (46)	14.54 (370.2)
Average snowfall inches (cm)	2.0 (5.1)	1.0 (2.5)	0.7 (1.8)	1.0 (2.5)	0.0 (0.0)	0.0 (0.0)	0.0 (0.0)	0.0 (0.0)	0.0 (0.0)	0.2 (0.51)	1.2 (3.0)	3.6 (9.1)	9.7 (24.51)
Average precipitation days (≥ 0.01 in)	10.9	9.7	9.7	9.7	9.7	6.3	2.5	2.7	3.8	7.9	10.3	12.1	95.3
Average snowy days (≥ 0.1 in)	2.0	1.6	0.6	0.2	0.0	0.0	0.0	0.0	0.0	0.1	0.9	2.4	7.8
Source 1: NOAA
Source 2: National Weather Service

== Demographics ==
Historical population
Census	Pop.	Note	%±
1890	184		—
1900	249		35.3%
1910	175		−29.7%
1920	199		13.7%
1930	136		−31.7%
1940	90		−33.8%
1950	60		−33.3%
1960	46		−23.3%
1970	51		10.9%
1980	39		−23.5%
1990	34		−12.8%
2000	59		73.5%
2010	46		−22.0%
2020	37		−19.6%

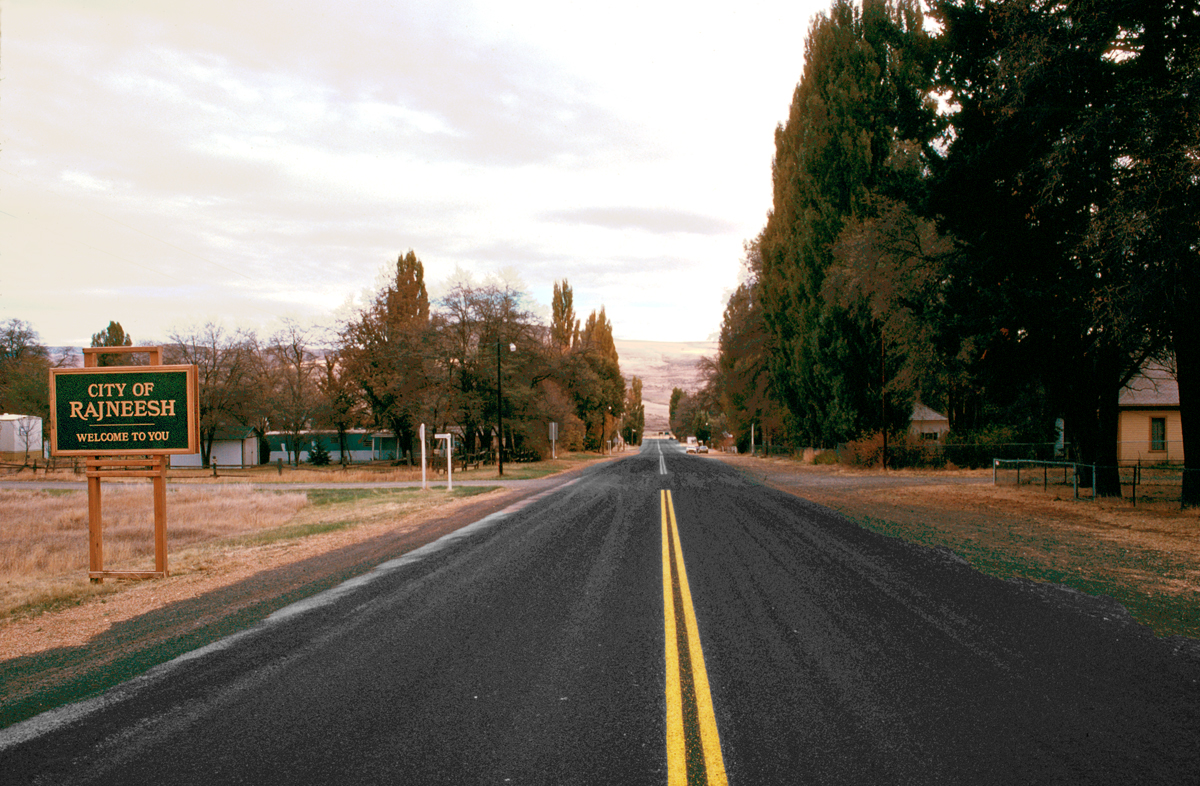
Sign on the entrance to Antelope reading "City of Rajneesh", circa 1985

=== 2020 census ===
As of the 2020 census, Antelope had a population of 37. The median age was 56.3 years, 16.2% of residents were under the age of 18, and 29.7% of residents were 65 years of age or older. For every 100 females there were 236.4 males, and for every 100 females age 18 and over there were 244.4 males age 18 and over.

0% of residents lived in urban areas, while 100.0% lived in rural areas.

There were 20 households in Antelope, of which 30.0% had children under the age of 18 living in them. Of all households, 15.0% were married-couple households, 65.0% were households with a male householder and no spouse or partner present, and 20.0% were households with a female householder and no spouse or partner present. About 50.0% of all households were made up of individuals and 20.0% had someone living alone who was 65 years of age or older.

There were 33 housing units, of which 39.4% were vacant. Among occupied housing units, 55.0% were owner-occupied and 45.0% were renter-occupied. The homeowner vacancy rate was 8.3% and the rental vacancy rate was 10.0%.

Racial composition as of the 2020 census
Race	Number	Percent
White	35	94.6%
Black or African American	0	0%
American Indian and Alaska Native	0	0%
Asian	0	0%
Native Hawaiian and Other Pacific Islander	0	0%
Some other race	1	2.7%
Two or more races	1	2.7%
Hispanic or Latino (of any race)	5	13.5%

=== 2010 census ===
As of the census of 2010, there were 46 people, 28 households, and 10 families residing in the city. The population density was 96 inhabitants per square mile (37.1/km^{2}). There were 43 housing units at an average density of 90 per square mile (34.7/km^{2}). The racial makeup of the city was 91.3% White (42 people), 2.2% Native American (1 person), 2.2% Asian (1 person), and 4.3% from two or more races (2 people).

There were 28 households, of which 11% (3 households) had children under the age of 18 living with them, 21% (6 households) were married couples living together, 4% (1 household) had a female householder with no husband present, 11% (3 households) had a male householder with no wife present, and 64% (18 households) were non-families. About 61% (17 households) of all households were made up of individuals, and 46% (13 households) had someone living alone who was 65 years of age or older. The average household size was 1.64 and the average family size was 2.70.

The median age in the city was 62 years. About 15% of residents (7 people) were under the age of 18; 2% (1 person) were between the ages of 18 and 24; 11% (5 people) were from 25 to 44; 30.3% (14 people) were from 45 to 64; and 41% (19 people) were 65 years of age or older. The gender makeup of the city was 52% (24 people) male and 48% (22 people) female.

== Notable people ==
- H. L. Davis (1894–1960) – Pulitzer Prize winning novelist
