= Oregon Route 218 =

State highway in northern Oregon, US

Oregon Route 218
- Route 218 highlighted in red

Route information
- Maintained by ODOT
- Length: 42.08 mi (67.72 km)

Major junctions
- West end: US 97 in Shaniko
- OR 293 in Antelope
- East end: OR 19 in Fossil

Location
- Country: United States
- State: Oregon
- Counties: Wasco, Wheeler

Highway system
- Oregon Highways; Interstate; US; State; Named; Scenic
← OR 217	→ OR 219

Oregon Route 218 (OR 218) is an Oregon state highway that runs between the small towns of Shaniko and Fossil in north-central Oregon and is known as the Shaniko-Fossil Highway No. 291 (see Oregon highways and routes). OR 218 is a part of the Journey Through Time Scenic Byway, an Oregon state byway.

== Route description ==
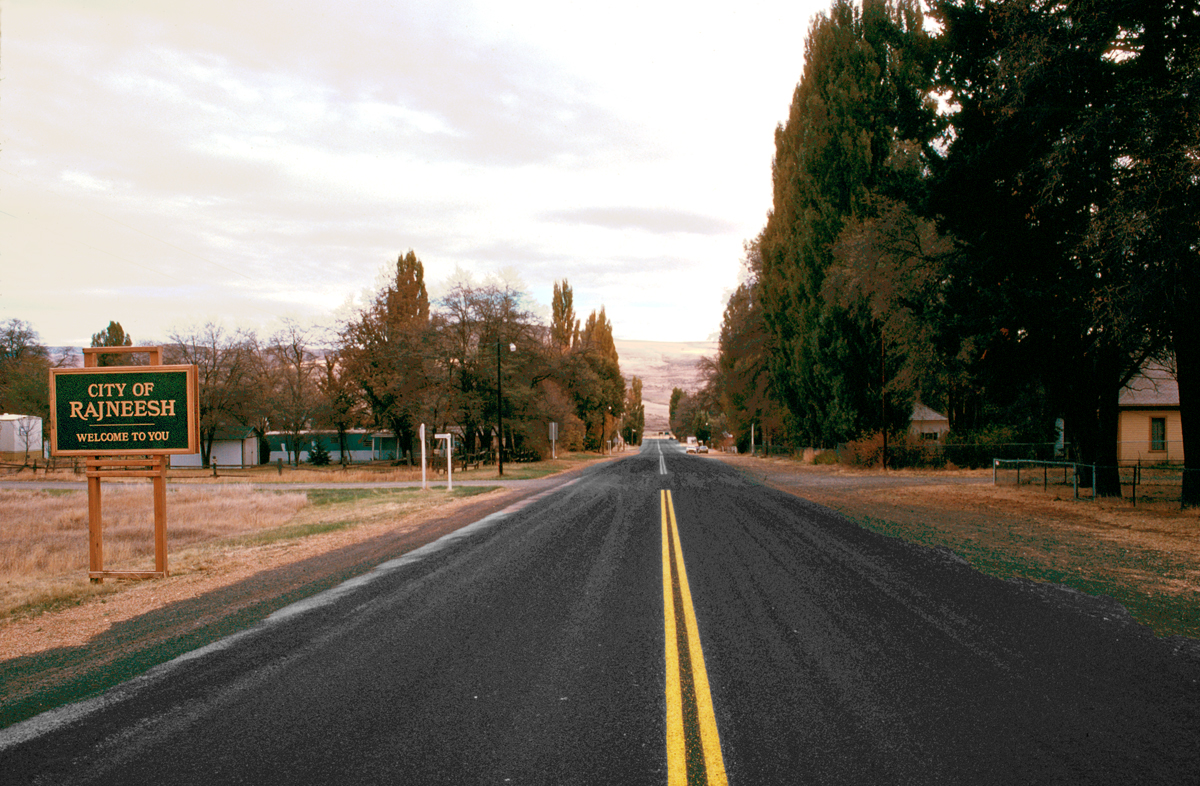
OR 218 eastbound entering Antelope in 1985 (then known as Rajneesh)

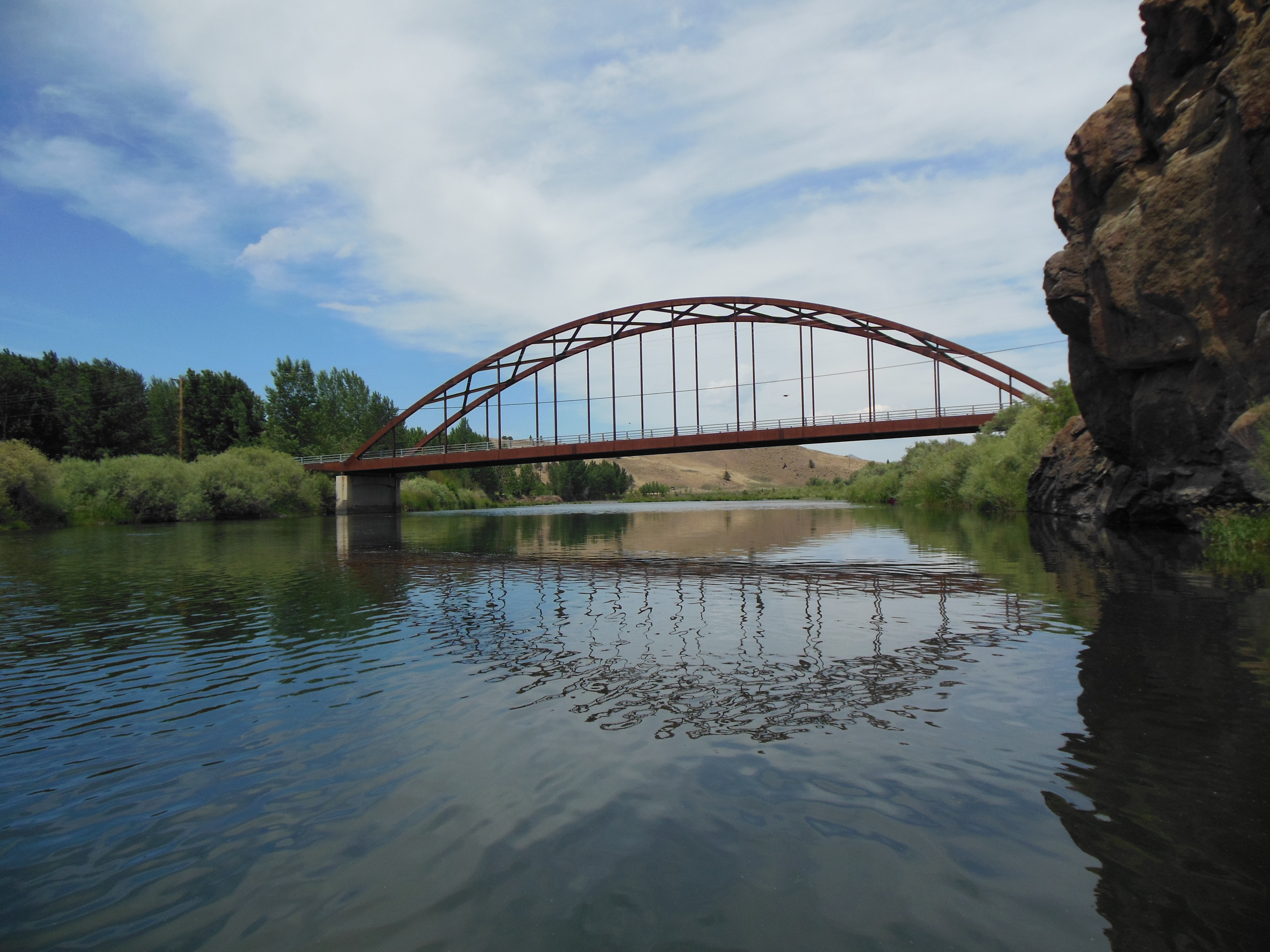
Clarno Bridge carrying OR 218 over the John Day River

OR 218 is a fairly short rural highway. Its western terminus is in Wasco County, in the ghost town of Shaniko at U.S. Route 97. The road is very windy and hilly over its entire 43-mile (69 km) length and is a popular destination for motorcyclists. It runs through the small town of Antelope (population 50) and has a junction with OR 293 on the south end of town.

More mountainous terrain follows, and the highway crosses the John Day River into Wheeler County at Clarno. Just east of Clarno is the Clarno Unit of the John Day Fossil Beds National Monument. Between Clarno and Fossil (the largest town on the route, with a population of about 475), the road has several sharp curves, with a posted speed limit of 15 miles per hour (24 km/h) in several places. The eastern terminus is in Fossil at the junction of Washington Street and Seventh Street (OR 19).

== Major junctions ==
County	Location	mi	km	Destinations	Notes
Wasco	Shaniko	0.00	0.00	US 97 (Sherman Highway) / D Street – Madras, Bend, Grass Valley, Biggs Junction	
Wasco	Antelope	7.96– 8.00	12.81– 12.87	OR 293 west (Antelope Highway) – Willowdale, Madras	Eastern terminus of OR 293
John Day River		22.90	36.85	Clarno Bridge; Wasco–Wheeler county line	
Wheeler	Fossil	42.08	67.72	OR 19 (John Day Highway) / Washington Street – Condon, Spray	
1.000 mi = 1.609 km; 1.000 km = 0.621 mi
