= Columbia Southern Hotel =

Historic hotel in Oregon, United States

- U.S. National Register of Historic Places
- U.S. Historic district – Contributing property
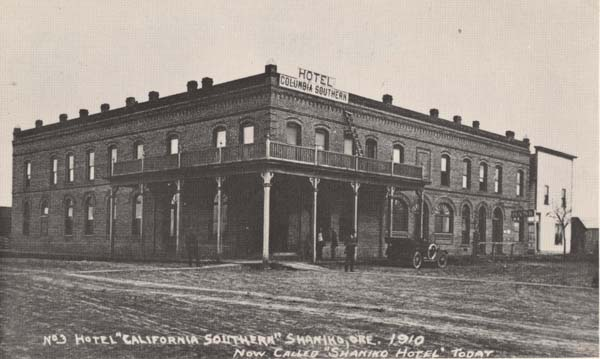
- The Columbia Southern Hotel in 1910
- Location: 4th and E Streets; Shaniko, Oregon
- Coordinates: 45°00′13″N 120°45′10″W
- Built: 1900–1902
- Architectural style: Italianate
- Part of: Shaniko Historic District (ID82003754)
- NRHP reference No.: 79002150
- Added to NRHP: October 31, 1979

The Columbia Southern Hotel, also known as the Shaniko Hotel, is a historic hotel, located in Shaniko, Oregon, United States. Built by the Columbia Southern Railway in 1900–1902 at the southern terminus of its line, the hotel was and remains the most imposing structure in Shaniko. It was the hub and focal point of the community during the heyday of the local wool industry in the early decades of the 20th century. In addition to lodging, it served as saloon, bank, stagecoach stop, dance hall, and general gathering place.

The hotel was listed on the National Register of Historic Places in 1979. In 1982 it was additionally listed as a contributing resource in the National Register-listed Shaniko Historic District.

== Gallery ==
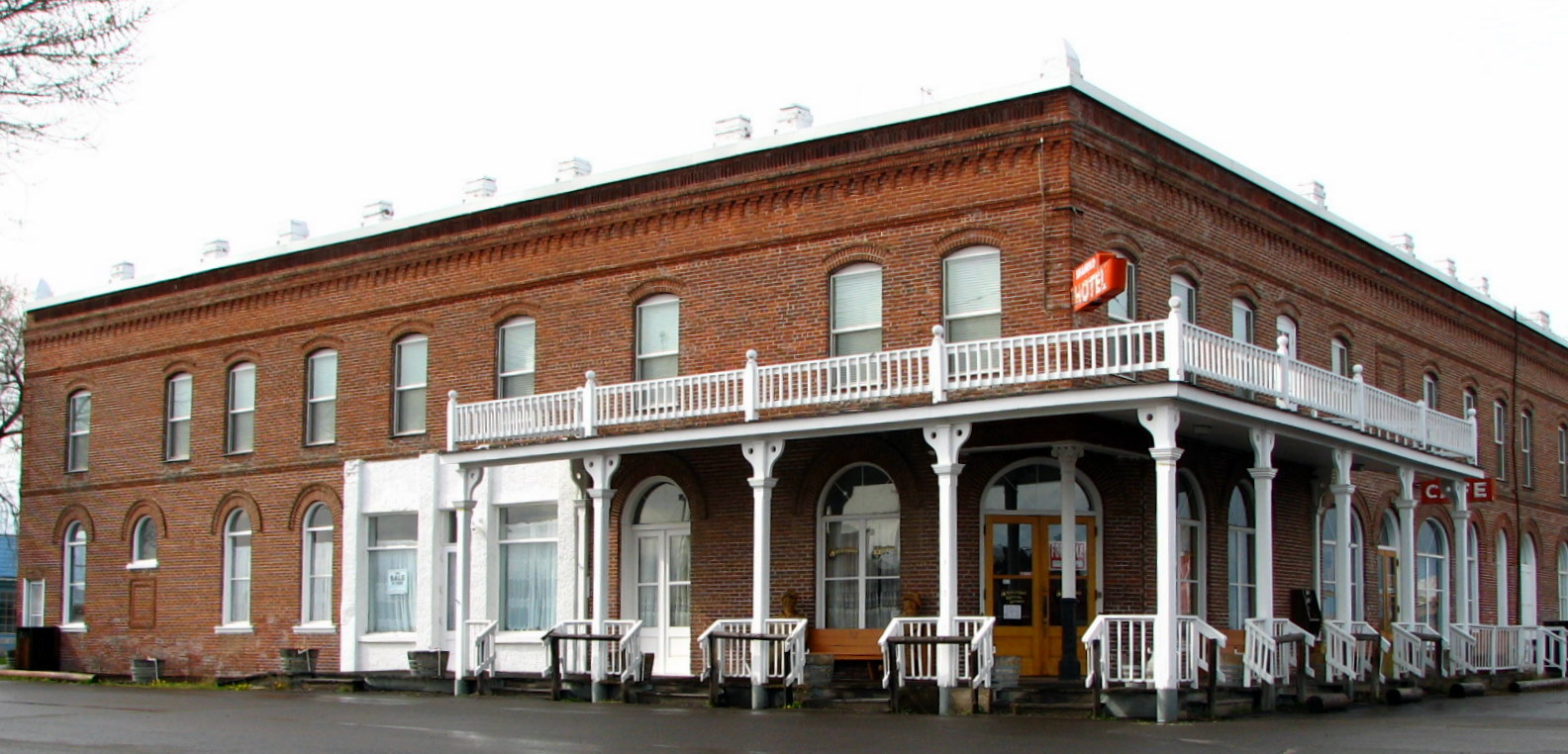
The hotel in May 2009

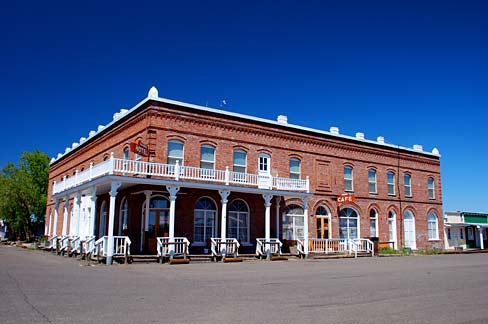
The hotel in June 2008

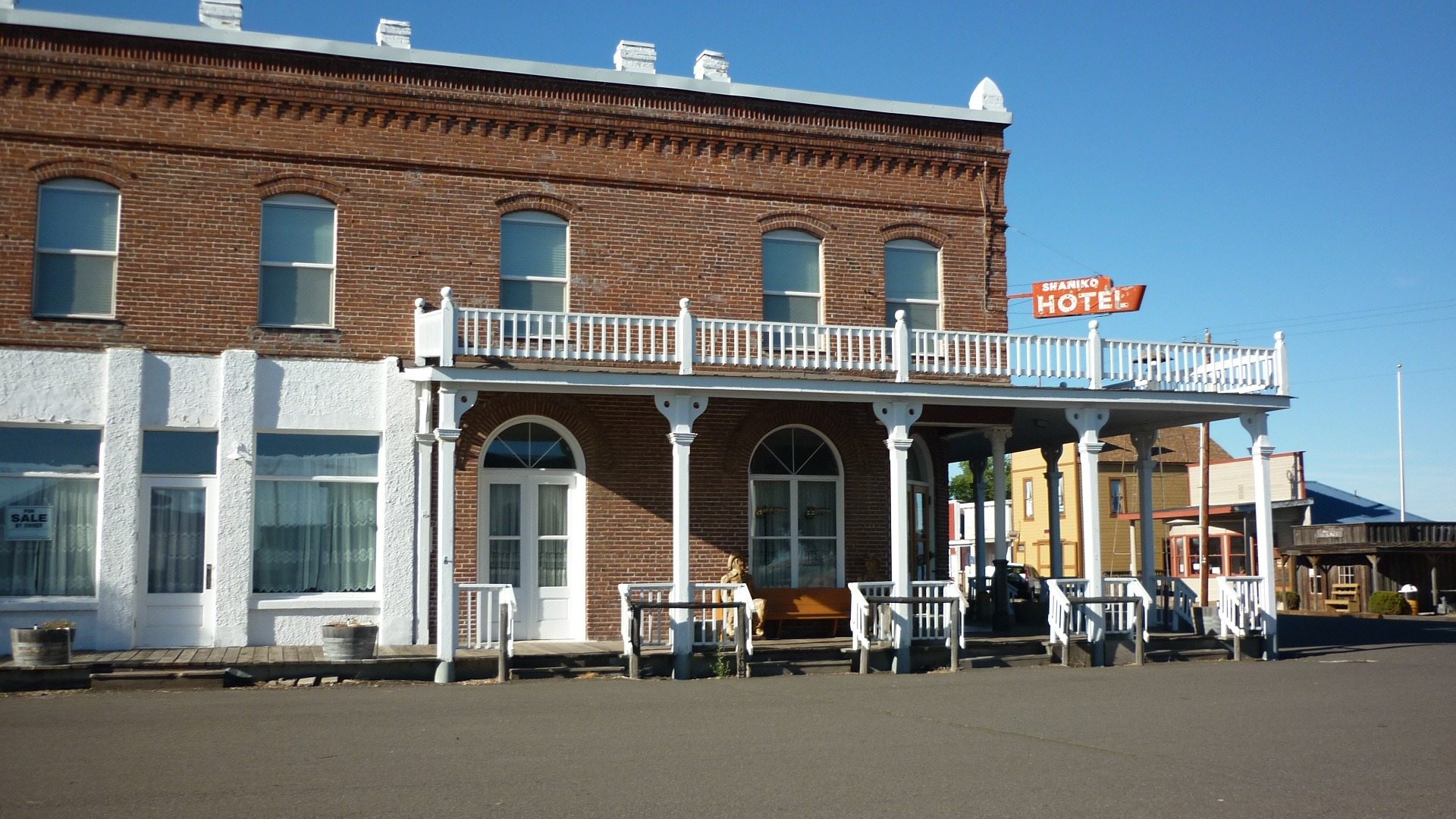
The hotel in April 2009

== See also ==
- National Register of Historic Places listings in Wasco County, Oregon
