= Imperial Stock Ranch Headquarters Complex =

- U.S. National Register of Historic Places
- U.S. Historic district
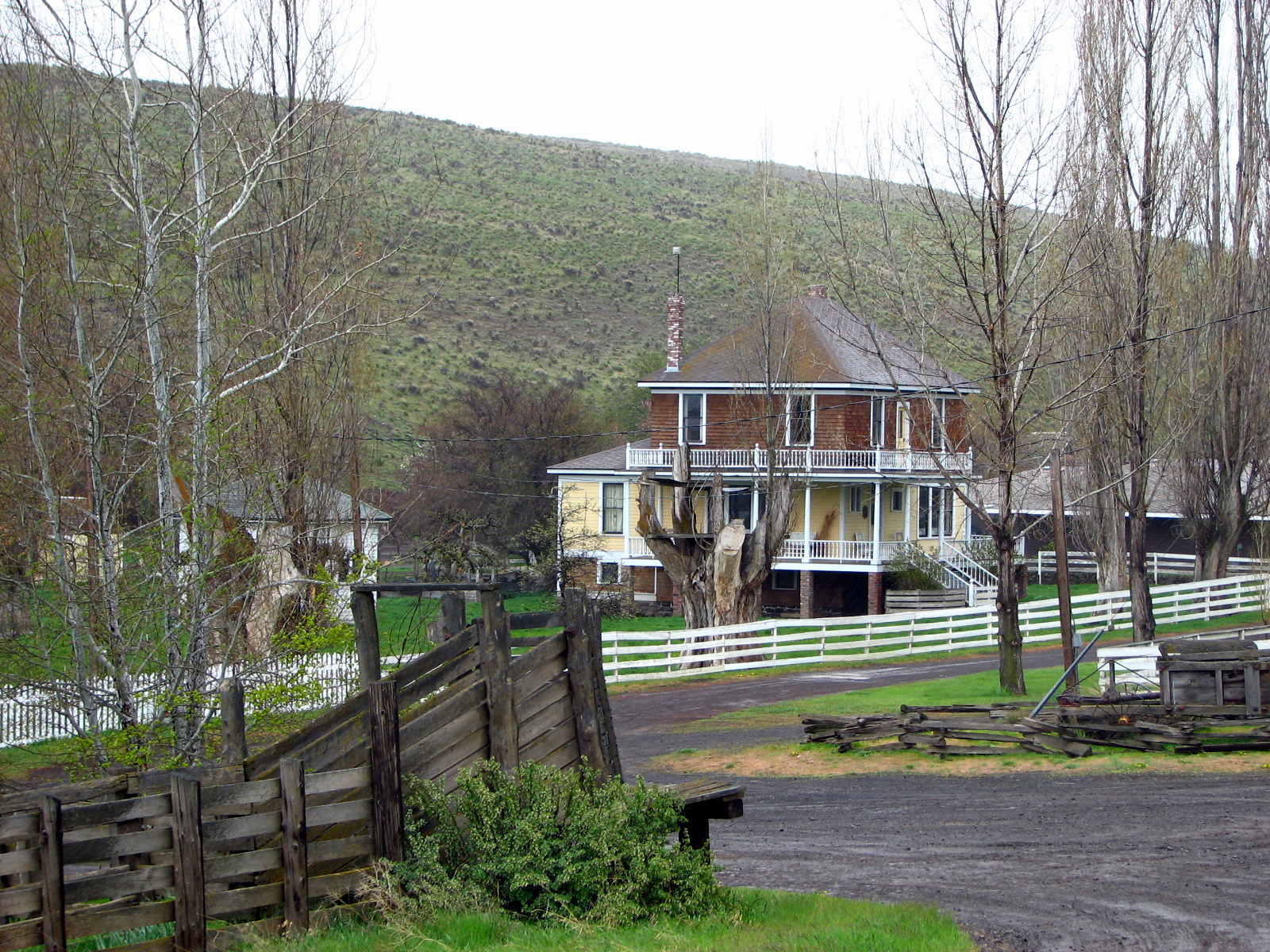
- The Imperial Stock Ranch Headquarters Complex in 2009
- Nearest city: Shaniko, Oregon
- Coordinates: 45°05′55″N 120°47′22″W
- Area: 20.2 acres (8.2 ha)
- Built: 1900
- Architectural style: Colonial Revival
- NRHP reference No.: 94000808
- Added to NRHP: August 5, 1994

The Imperial Stock Ranch Headquarters Complex is a historic district near Shaniko in Wasco County, Oregon, United States, listed on the National Register of Historic Places.

== See also ==
- National Register of Historic Places listings in Wasco County, Oregon
