= Antone, Oregon =

Former unincorporated community in the state of Oregon, United States

- Former community
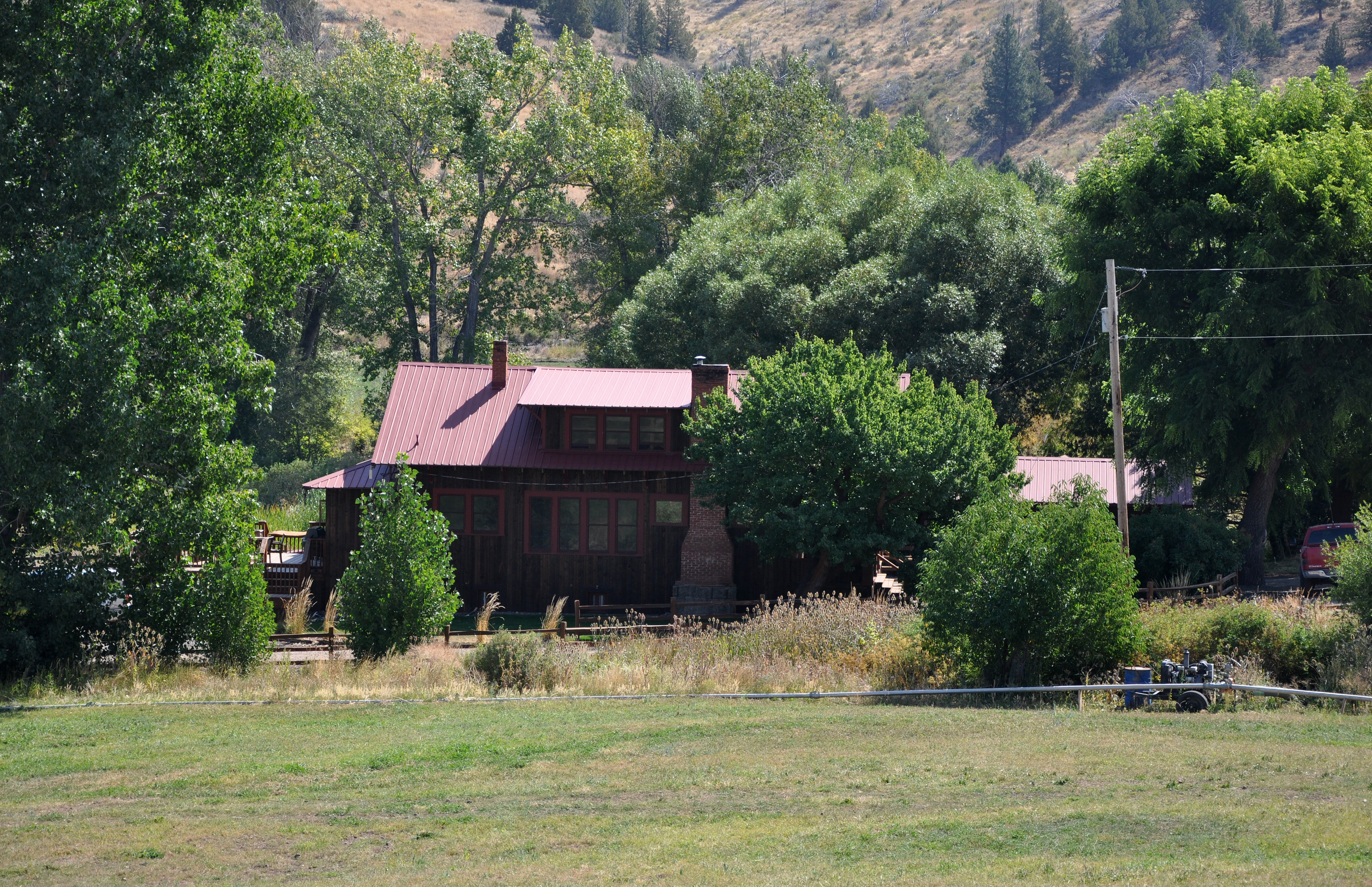
- Ranch house at Antone in 2011

- Location within the state of Oregon Antone, Oregon (the United States)
- Coordinates: 44°28′18″N 119°48′36″W
- Country: United States
- State: Oregon
- County: Wheeler
- Named for: Antone Francisco, a pioneer settler
- Elevation: 3,458 ft (1,054 m)
- Time zone: UTC-8 (PST)
  - Summer (DST): UTC-7 (PDT)
- Area code: 541
- Coordinates and elevation from United States Geological Survey

Antone was an unincorporated community in Wheeler County, in the U.S. state of Oregon. Antone is south of U.S. Route 26 between Mitchell and Dayville.

A gravel road called Antone Lane runs south of and roughly parallel to Route 26, to which it connects both east of Mitchell, in Wheeler County, and west of Dayville, in Grant County. The road crosses Rock Creek, a tributary of the John Day River, at Antone. The Ochoco Mountains and the Ochoco National Forest are directly south of Antone.

The location was named in the early 1890s for Antone Francisco, a pioneer settler of Portuguese descent. A post office operated in Antone from 1894 through 1948 except for a three-year hiatus.

Antone was the site of a U.S. Army barracks built to protect miners and other travelers after Chief Paulina's Northern Paiute warriors killed several soldiers in this vicinity in 1864. The barracks were along a wagon road, renamed The Dalles Military Road in about 1870, that connected The Dalles on the Columbia River with gold mines near Canyon City.
