= Sherrer =

Sherrer is a surname. Notable people with the surname include:

- Ben Sherrer (born 1968), American politician
- Gary Sherrer (Kansas politician) (born 1940), American politician
- Gary Sherrer (Oklahoma politician), American politician
- Larry Sherrer (born 1950), American football player

== See also ==
- Sherar, surname
