= Antelope School =

Historic building in Antelope, Oregon, U.S.

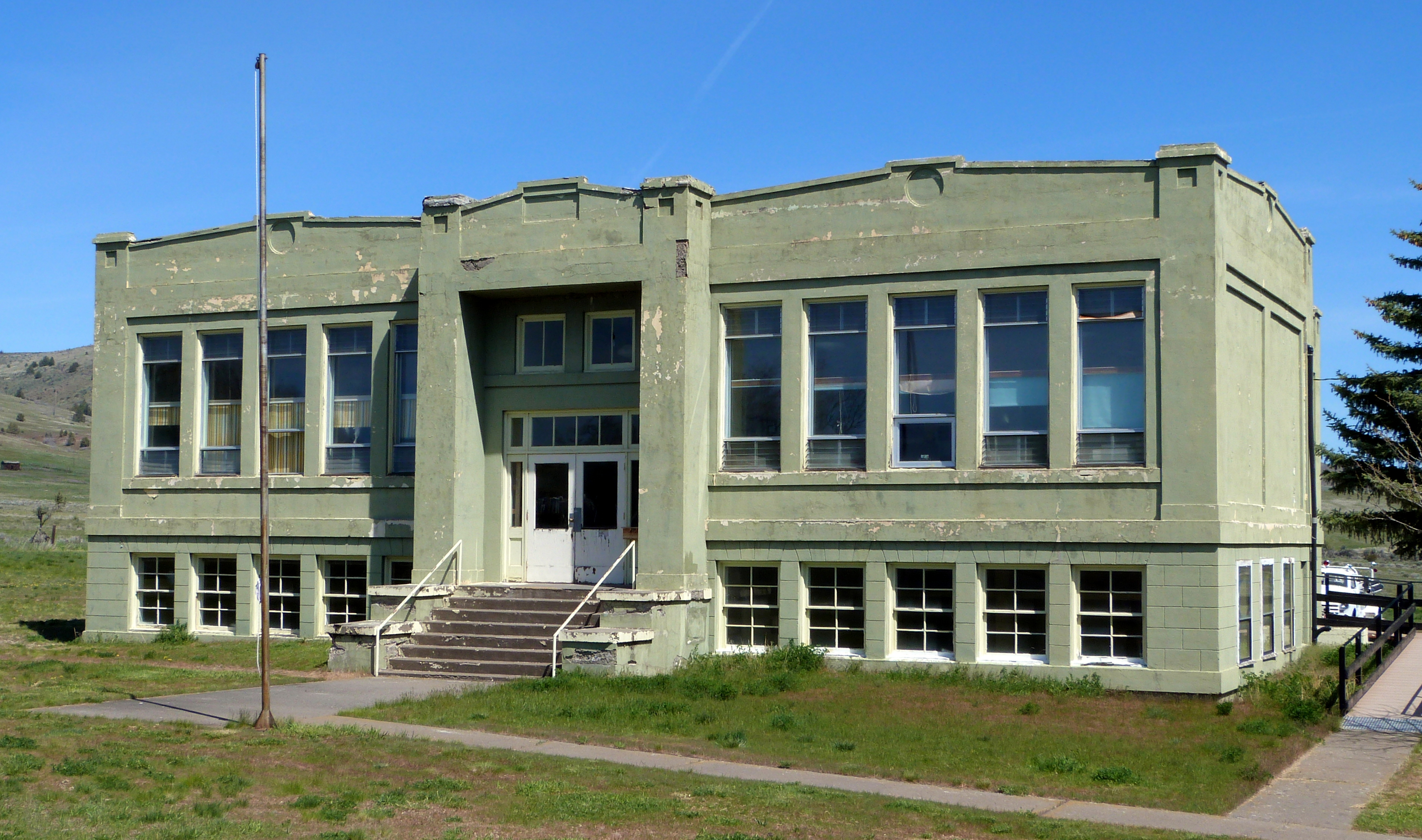
- The school's exterior in 2012

Location
- Antelope, Oregon; United States; 44.91309°N 120.72387°W

Information
- Established: 1924
- Closed: Yes

Antelope School is an historic building in Antelope, Oregon. Completed in 1924, the school is listed on the National Register of Historic Places.

The building no longer is used as a school, but as a community center and municipal office space.

== See also ==
- National Register of Historic Places listings in Wasco County, Oregon
