= Clarno, Oregon =

Unincorporated community in Oregon, United States

- Unincorporated community
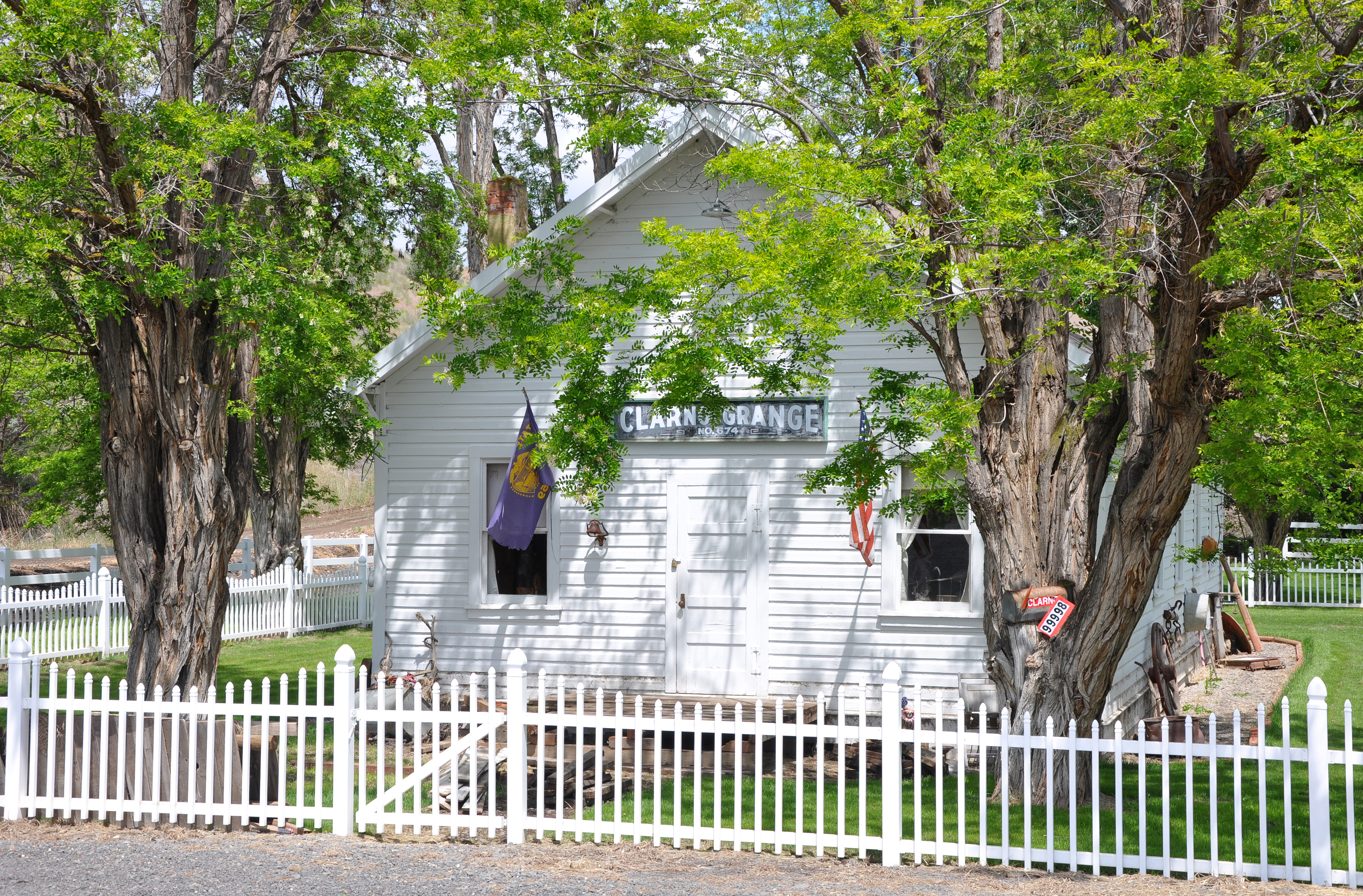
- Clarno Grange in 2011

- Location within the state of Oregon Clarno, Oregon (the United States)
- Coordinates: 44°54′48″N 120°28′24″W
- Country: United States
- State: Oregon
- County: Wasco
- Named after: Andrew Clarno
- Elevation: 1,306 ft (398 m)
- Time zone: UTC-8 (PST)
  - Summer (DST): UTC-7 (PDT)
- ZIP codes: 97001
- Area code: 541
- GNIS feature ID: 1136154

Clarno is an unincorporated community in Wasco County, Oregon, United States. It is located along Oregon Route 218 near the John Day River.

== History ==
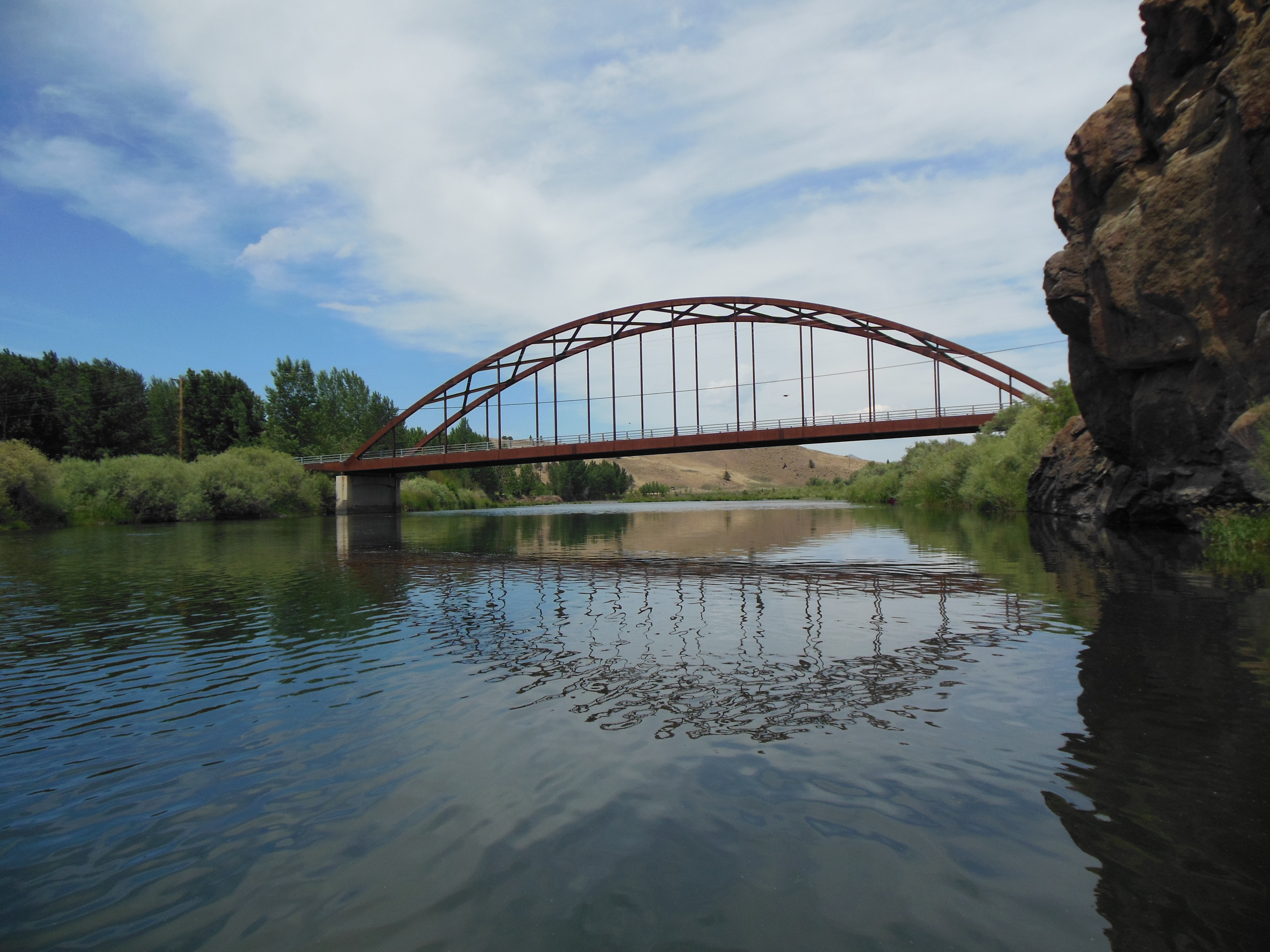
Oregon Route 218 bridge over the John Day River at Clarno

The community was named after Andrew Clarno, an early settler. The Clarno post office was established in 1894 in what was then Gilliam County, from which Wheeler County was later carved. After that, the post office was sometimes in Wheeler County, on the east side of the river, or in Wasco County, on the west side, depending on who was postmaster. The office closed in 1949.

Charles Clarno, Andrew's son, built a miniature steamboat, The John Day Queen, used as a ferry and for pleasure trips. Propelled by steam from a wood-fired boiler, the 40-foot (12 m) craft plied the river from 10 miles (16 km) upstream of Clarno to about 4 miles (6 km) below. After a bridge was constructed at Clarno in 1897, the younger Clarno decided to float the boat down the John Day River to the Columbia River and then down the Columbia to Portland. (Note: By river, the distance from Clarno to the Columbia River is about 110 miles (180 km)). The attempt ended in failure at Clarno Rapids, slightly beyond where the boat normally traveled. There The John Day Queen broke free from guide ropes held by Charles Clarno and his friends and smashed on the rocks downstream. The spark arrestor from the boat was later rescued and donated to the city museum in Fossil.

== Parks and recreation ==
For whitewater enthusiasts, the long and complicated Clarno Rapids is rated at class 3 (difficult) on the International Scale of River Difficulty or class 4 (very difficult) in high water.

Clarno is located just west of the Clarno Unit of John Day Fossil Beds National Monument.

== Notes and references ==
Notes
