= Sherars Falls =

Waterfall in Wasco County, Oregon

Sherar's Falls
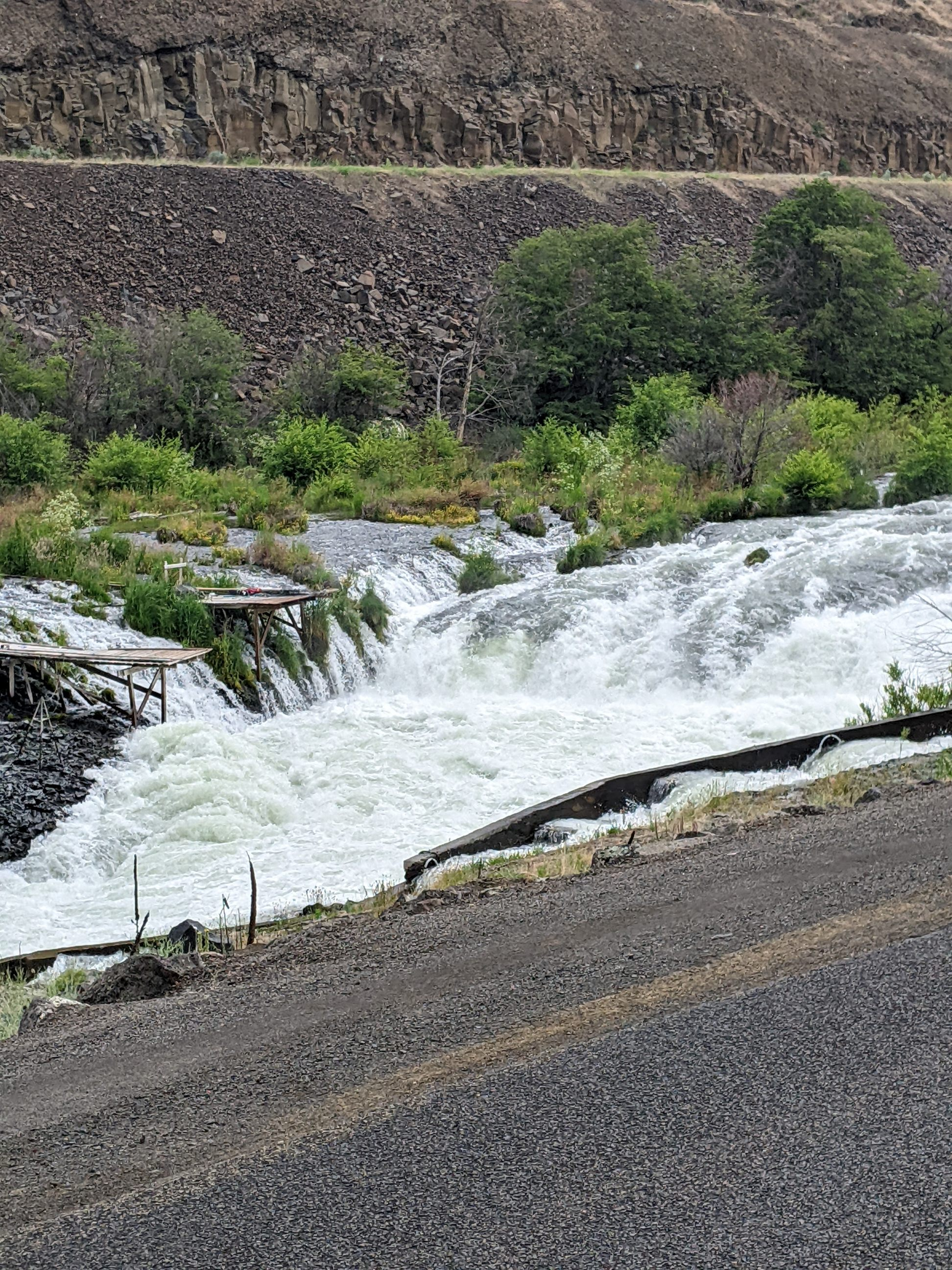
- Sherars Falls and fishing structures

- Location within the United States
- Location: Wasco County, Oregon, U.S.
- Coordinates: 45.2571°N 121.0394°W
- Elevation: 686 ft (209 m)
- Total height: 15 ft (4.6 m)
- Number of drops: 1
- Average flow rate: 4,000 cu ft/s (110 m^{3}/s)

Sherars Falls is a small waterfall along the Deschutes River in Wasco County, Oregon, United States. It is located just north of the city of Maupin on Oregon Route 216 at Sherar's Bridge. It is about 15 feet (4.6 metres) high and is the last waterfall along the Deschutes River before it empties into the Columbia River. The waterfall is rated as a class 6 whitewater and has an administrative closure to boaters because of the danger. It was named after Joseph Sherar, a 19th-century wagon road builder. It is a place considered a sacred fishing ground by local native tribes.

== Location ==
Sherars Falls is located east of Tygh Valley and north of Maupin. It is crossed upstream by Sherar's Bridge for Barlow Road. The road is historically the place where wagon trains crossed the Deschutes River and proceeded west in order to bypass The Dalles.

== Fishing ==
The waters of Sherars Falls are located in the heart of the Warm Springs Indian Reservation. The waterfall and its surroundings are a well-known location for Tribal fishing for salmon and steelhead for subsistence purposes using the traditional dip-nets technique. This method has been used by tribes to fish in the particularly rough waters of waterfalls and rapids. The setting around the waterfall makes it a prime location to use dip-net fishing. Many fishermen reach from surrounding boulders although several platforms have been erected by the local tribe members. Only tribal members are permitted to fish on and around these structures by federal permit issued to the Warm Springs Reservation.

== Regulations ==
Fishing for salmon, steelhead and Lamprey eel is regulated by the tribal council. Fishing is allowed 24 hours a day and is monitored by the Fish and Wildlife Committee. Marked spring Chinook, marked and unmarked fall Chinook, and coho as well as marked steelhead may be kept after being fished. On the other hand, regulations require all un-marked spring Chinook and steelhead, and sockeye to be released year round. Lamprey harvest at Sherars Falls is allowed when lamprey arrive from June through the end of August using hands or hand-powered tools such as dip nets or gaffs. Freezer harvest will end after 750 eels are caught.

== See also ==
- List of waterfalls in Oregon
