= Shaniko, Oregon =

- City
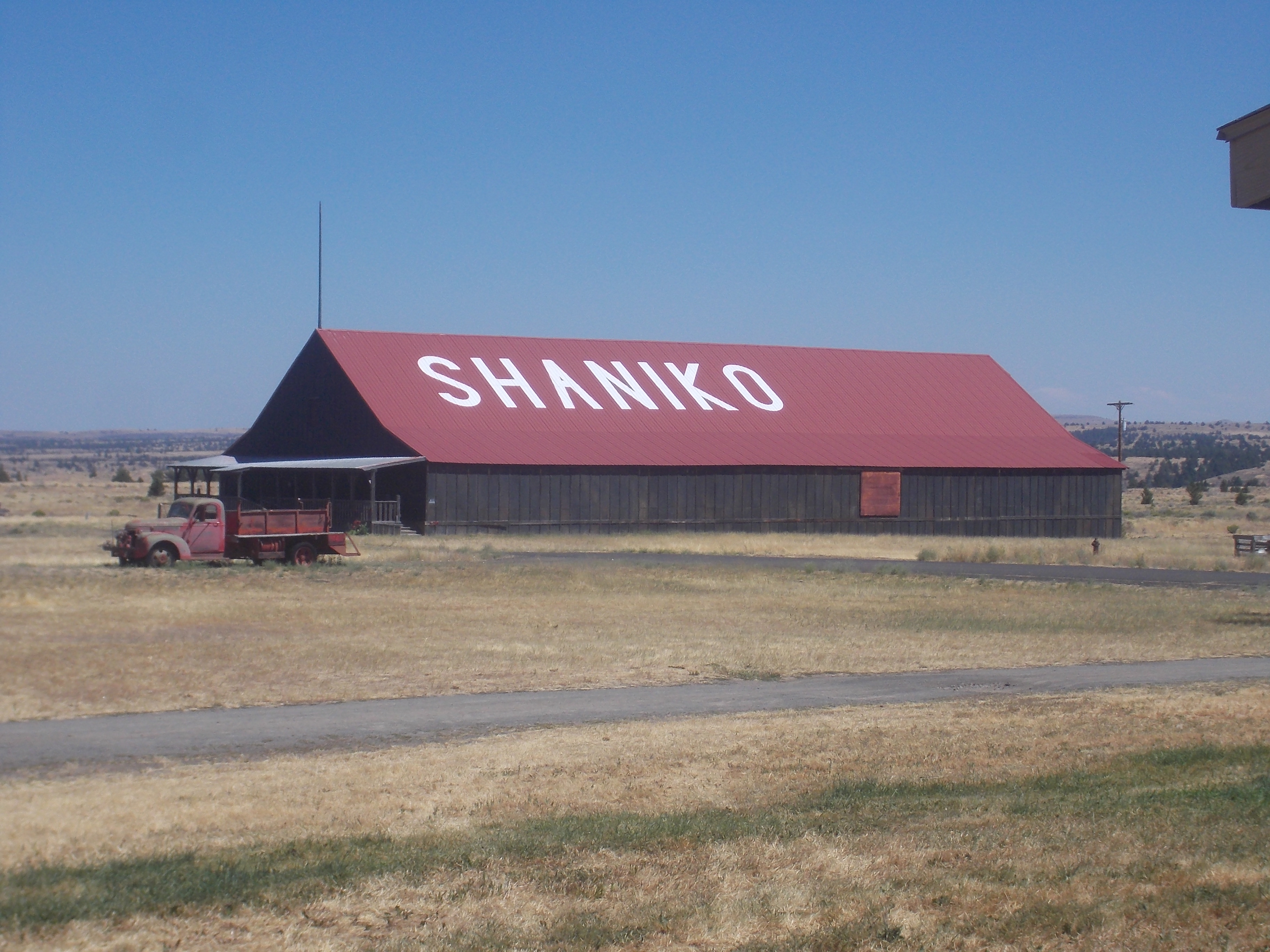
- City name written on barn in Shaniko
- Nickname: Oregon's Best Known Ghost Town
- Location in Oregon
- Coordinates: 45°0′11″N 120°45′11″W
- Country: United States
- State: Oregon
- County: Wasco
- Incorporated: 1901

Government
  - Mayor: Mark Haskett

Area
  - Total: 0.50 sq mi (1.29 km^{2})
  - Land: 0.50 sq mi (1.29 km^{2})
  - Water: 0 sq mi (0.00 km^{2})
- Elevation: 3,343 ft (1,019 m)

Population (2020)
  - Total: 30
  - Density: 60.3/sq mi (23.28/km^{2})
- Time zone: UTC-8 (Pacific)
  - Summer (DST): UTC-7 (Pacific)
- ZIP code: 97057
- Area code: 541
- FIPS code: 41-66700
- GNIS feature ID: 2411876
- Website: cityofshaniko.org

Shaniko (/ˈʃænɪkoʊ/, SHAN-i-koh) is a town located in Wasco County, Oregon, United States, on U.S. Route 97 and about 8 miles (13 km) north of Antelope. The population was 30 at the 2020 census.

== Geography ==
Shaniko is in Wasco County, in north-central Oregon, at the intersection of U.S. Route 97 and Oregon Route 218. The town is 69 miles (111 km) north of Redmond and 131 miles (211 km) east of Portland. According to the United States Census Bureau, the town has a total area of 0.50 square miles (1.29 km^{2}), all of it land.

The town is at an elevation of 3,343 feet (1,019 m). On the high plateau on which Shaniko was built, the soil is thin and the vegetation sparse, consisting mainly of sagebrush, bunchgrass, and occasional junipers. Many peaks of the Cascade Range, including Hood, Jefferson, Adams, St. Helens and Rainier, are visible from the city.

== History ==
The first European Americans came to the Shaniko area after the discovery of gold in Canyon City, Oregon, in 1862. The route to Canyon City started at the early settlement of The Dalles, 190 miles (310 km) away. Camps were made wherever water could be found. One camp, which became the farming community of Bakeoven, was closely associated with the future town of Shaniko, while another camp, Cross Hollow, was within the present Shaniko city limits. In 1867, following complaints of hostile Indians and fear of robbery of those transporting gold, the State of Oregon received a grant from the United States government to build a military wagon road from The Dalles to Fort Boise in what was then Washington Territory, (now Idaho). Following this road, homesteaders began claiming land in Central Oregon that previously had been fairly inaccessible.

One of these settlers was August Scherneckau, who came to the area after the Civil War, in 1874. The spelling of the town's name reflects local Native American pronunciation of Scherneckau's name. The town was originally called Cross Hollow, and a post office by that name was established in May 1879 with Scherneckau as postmaster. Cross Hollow post office closed in 1887, and Shaniko post office opened in 1900. An application to incorporate the city was submitted February 9, 1901, and the first official meeting of the Shaniko city council occurred on March 16, 1901.

The town's heyday was the first decade of the 20th century, when Shaniko served as a transportation hub spurred by the presence of the Columbia Southern Railway, a subsidiary of Union Pacific Railroad, which built a branch from Biggs Junction to a terminus in Shaniko. That branch was completed in May 1900. At the time, the city was known as the "Wool Capital of the World", and it was a regional center of 20,000 square miles (52,000 km^{2}) of wool, wheat, cattle and sheep production, with no other such center east of the Cascade Range in Oregon. The region served by the city even stretched into Idaho, south to Klamath Falls, Oregon, and beyond, because of rail connections to the main line.

The residents of Shaniko voted to incorporate Shaniko and elected a mayor, F. T. Hurlbert, and other city officials on January 1, 1902. It was Wasco County's fifth largest city, boasting the largest wool warehouse in the state, from which 4 million pounds (1.8 kt) (2,000 tons) were marketed in 1901. It was surrounded by cattle ranches, which produced livestock for shipment that filled 400 railroad cars that year. In 1903, when Shaniko gained the nickname, "Wool Capital of the World", they shipped 2,229 tons of wool and 1,168,866 bushels of wheat. They made $3,000,000 in wool sales in 1903. The second sale of that year one warehouse deposited a million into the bank. There was a third sale that year as well. In 1904, total annual sales were five million dollars.

By 1911, the Oregon–Washington Railroad and Navigation Company, another Union Pacific subsidiary, began using an alternate route linking Portland to Bend by way of the Deschutes River canyon. The new line, advertised as the "direct, quick and natural route", diverted traffic from the Columbia Southern, and Shaniko began to decline. Passenger rail service to Shaniko ended in the early 1930s, and the entire line was shut down by 1966. By 1982 Shaniko was nearly a ghost town. Shaniko was first called a "ghost town" at the Oregon Centennial Exposition in Portland in 1959.

In 1985, Jean and Dorothy Farrell of Salem, OR bought the Shaniko Hotel which was deserted at that time. They invested their retirement savings to remodel the Hotel before it was reopened in 1988. Jean later became the Mayor of Shaniko and continued to own and operate the renovated hotel until he sold it in July 2000 to businessman Robert Pamplin Jr. Pamplin purchased the hotel and several other properties in Shaniko with intentions of bringing life back to this once thriving ghost town. Pamplin renovated some buildings and planned to build new houses for workers who would cater to tourists. But in 2008, the Shaniko City Council and the state of Oregon denied Pamplin an easement from a well on one of his lots to supply water to the hotel and restaurant bypassing having to purchase the water from the city. He ultimately shut down the hotel, cafe, RV park, and capped off the well. He eventually listed the properties for sale over an 8 year period before taking them off the market in 2016. In August 2023, Pamplin reopened the Shaniko Hotel once again to the public.

Shaniko attracts ghost town tourists, but a wastewater issue still prevents any large scale tourism efforts from forming. Local businesses operate seasonally from April to September to accommodate the tourists, including those in "Shaniko Row".

== Demographics ==
Historical population
Census	Pop.	Note	%±
1900	72		—
1910	495		587.5%
1920	124		−74.9%
1930	100		−19.4%
1940	55		−45.0%
1950	61		10.9%
1960	39		−36.1%
1970	58		48.7%
1980	30		−48.3%
1990	26		−13.3%
2000	26		0.0%
2010	36		38.5%
2020	30		−16.7%

=== 2020 census ===
As of the 2020 census, Shaniko had a population of 30. The median age was 66.5 years. 3.3% of residents were under the age of 18 and 56.7% of residents were 65 years of age or older. For every 100 females there were 76.5 males, and for every 100 females age 18 and over there were 81.2 males age 18 and over.

0% of residents lived in urban areas, while 100.0% lived in rural areas.

There were 11 households in Shaniko, of which 27.3% had children under the age of 18 living in them. Of all households, 36.4% were married-couple households, 18.2% were households with a male householder and no spouse or partner present, and 27.3% were households with a female householder and no spouse or partner present. About 18.2% of all households were made up of individuals and 18.2% had someone living alone who was 65 years of age or older.

There were 19 housing units, of which 42.1% were vacant. Among occupied housing units, 90.9% were owner-occupied and 9.1% were renter-occupied. The homeowner vacancy rate was 16.7% and the rental vacancy rate was 66.7%.

Racial composition as of the 2020 census
Race	Number	Percent
White	24	80.0%
Black or African American	0	0%
American Indian and Alaska Native	2	6.7%
Asian	0	0%
Native Hawaiian and Other Pacific Islander	0	0%
Some other race	1	3.3%
Two or more races	3	10.0%
Hispanic or Latino (of any race)	2	6.7%

=== 2010 census ===
As of the 2010 census, there were 36 people, 17 households, and 11 families residing in the city. The population density was 72 inhabitants per square mile (27.8/km^{2}). There were 24 housing units at an average density of 48 per square mile (18.5/km^{2}). The racial makeup of the city was 75% White, 8.3% Asian, and 16.7% from two or more races. Hispanic or Latino of any race were 8.3% of the population.

There were 17 households, of which about 18% had children under the age of 18 living with them, about 53% were married couples living together, about 6% had a female householder with no husband present, about 6% had a male householder with no wife present, and about 35% were non-families. About 29% of all households were made up of individuals, and about 18% had someone living alone who was 65 years of age or older. The average household size was 2.12 and the average family size was 2.55.

The median age in the city was about 55 years. About 17% of residents were under the age of 18; about 3% were between the ages of 18 and 24; 19.5% were from 25 to 44; about 28% were from 45 to 64; and about 33% were 65 years of age or older. The gender makeup of the city was about 58% male and 42% female.

== Points of interest ==
Shaniko and environs contain an individual historic building and two historic districts listed on the National Register of Historic Places (NRHP):

- Columbia Southern Hotel
- Imperial Stock Ranch Headquarters Complex
- Shaniko Historic District, including the Columbia Southern Hotel, the city hall and jailhouse, a schoolhouse, and 42 other properties, some of which have been renovated. The NRHP nomination form for the district provides historical details, references, images, and descriptions.
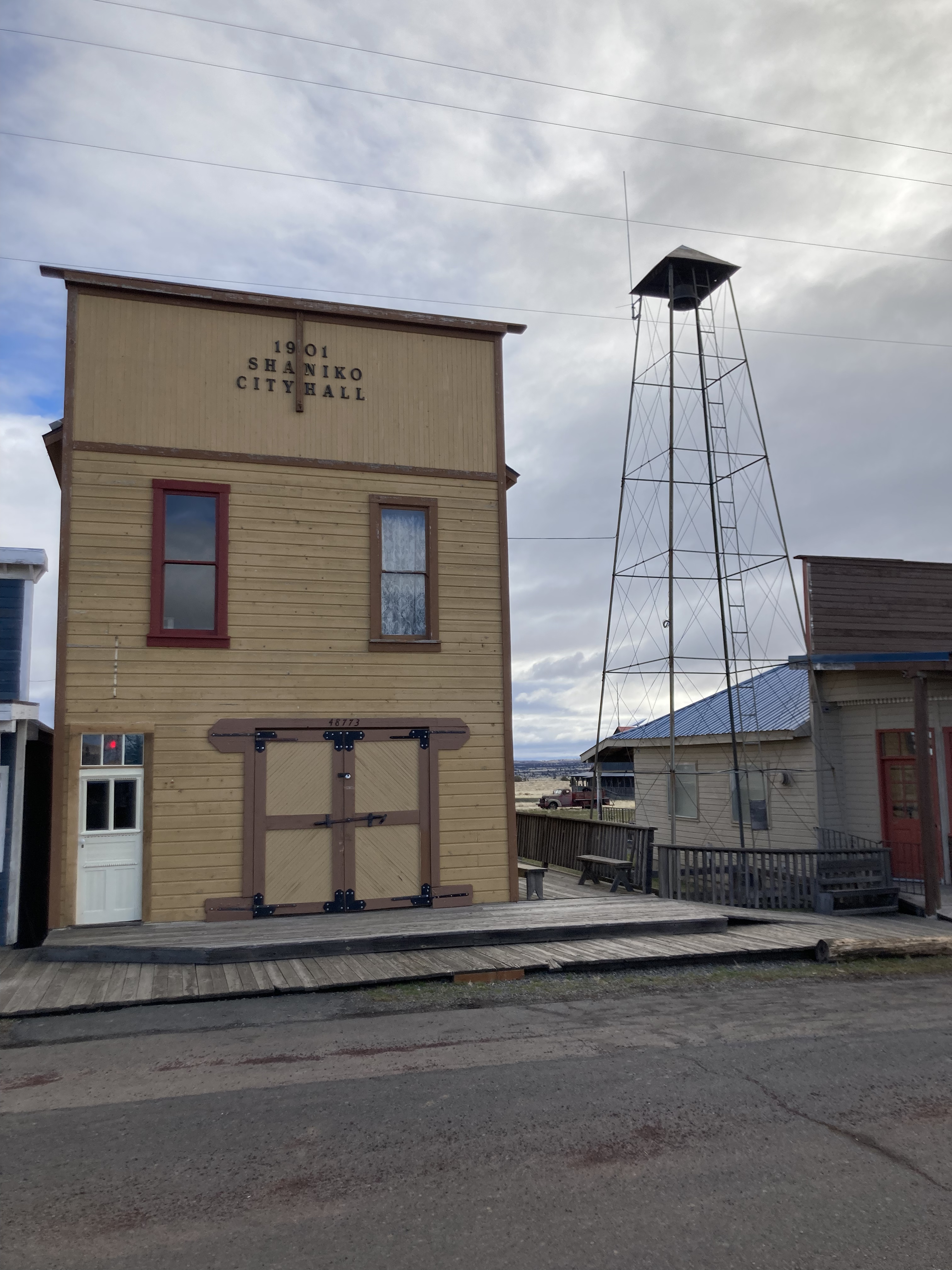
Shaniko City Hall

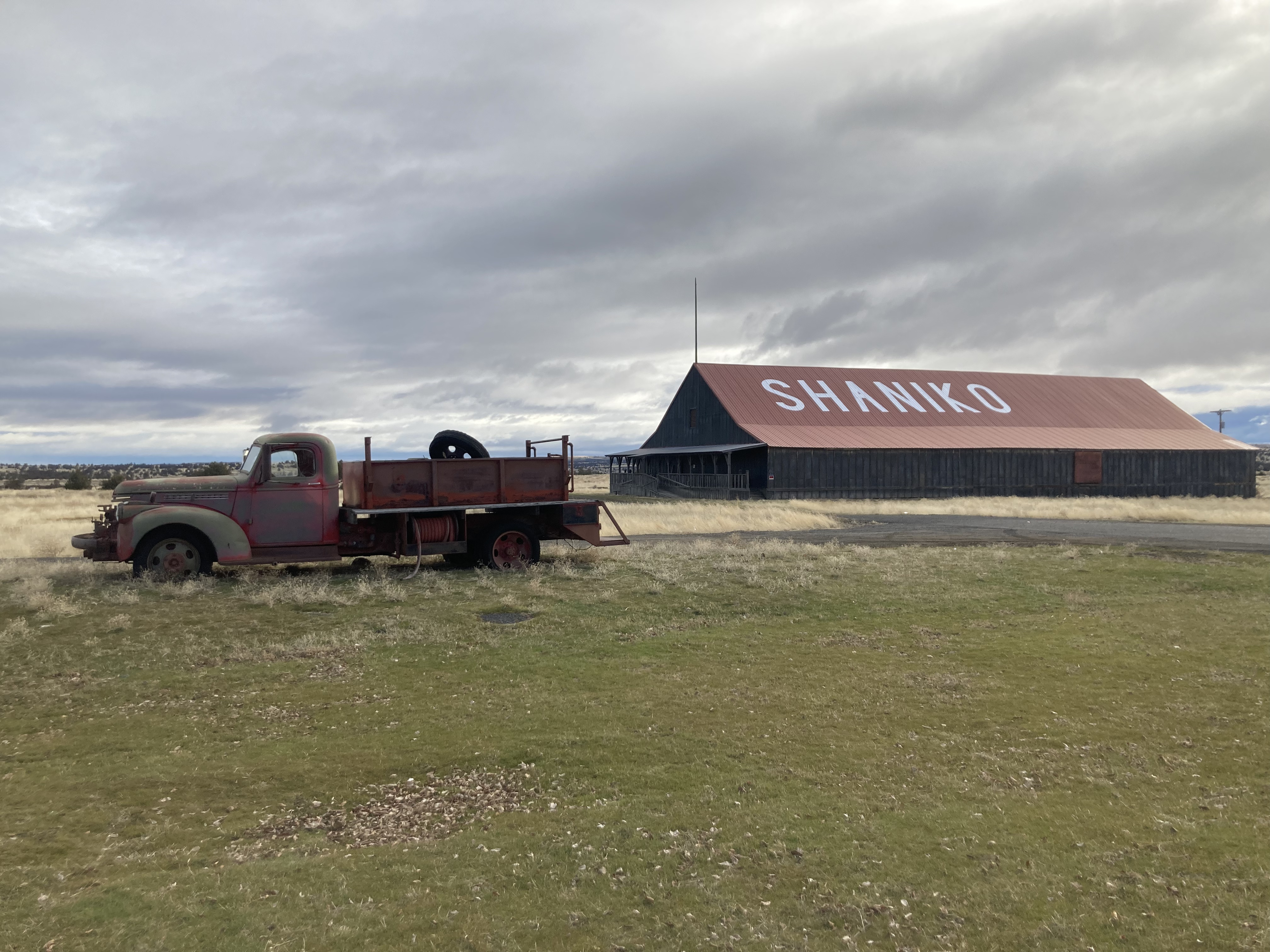
Barn and tractor

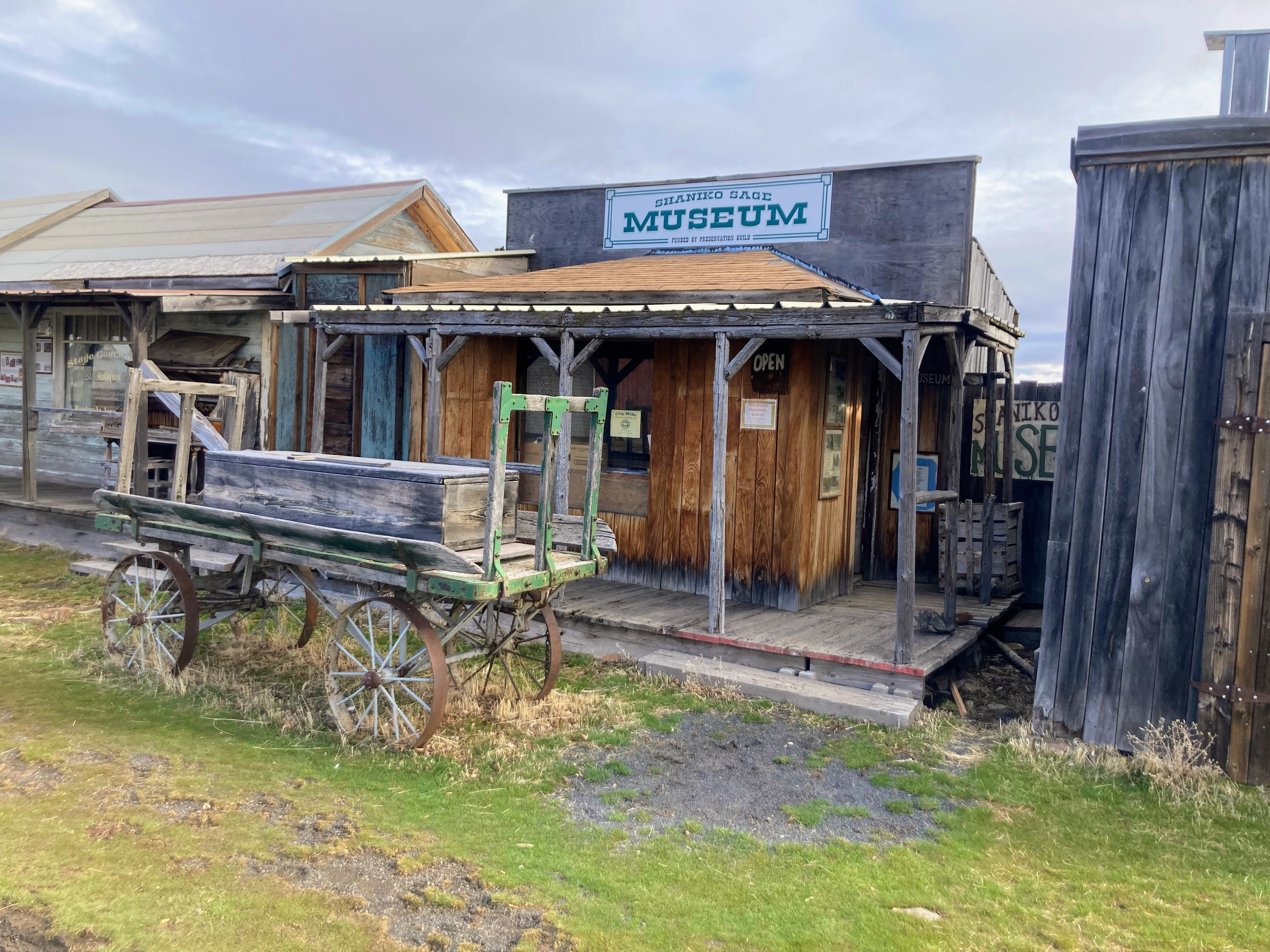
Museum and wagon

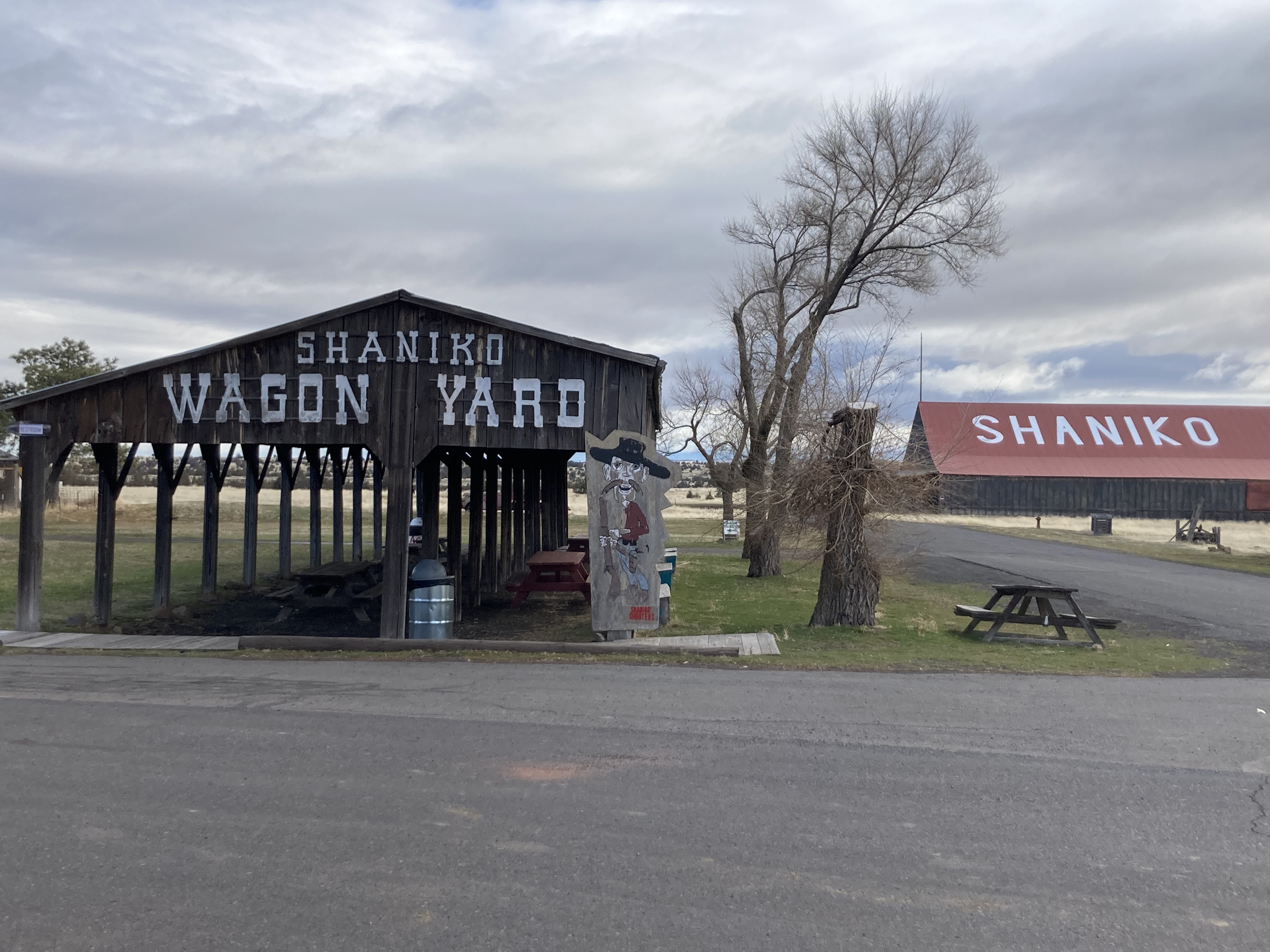
Wagon yard and barn

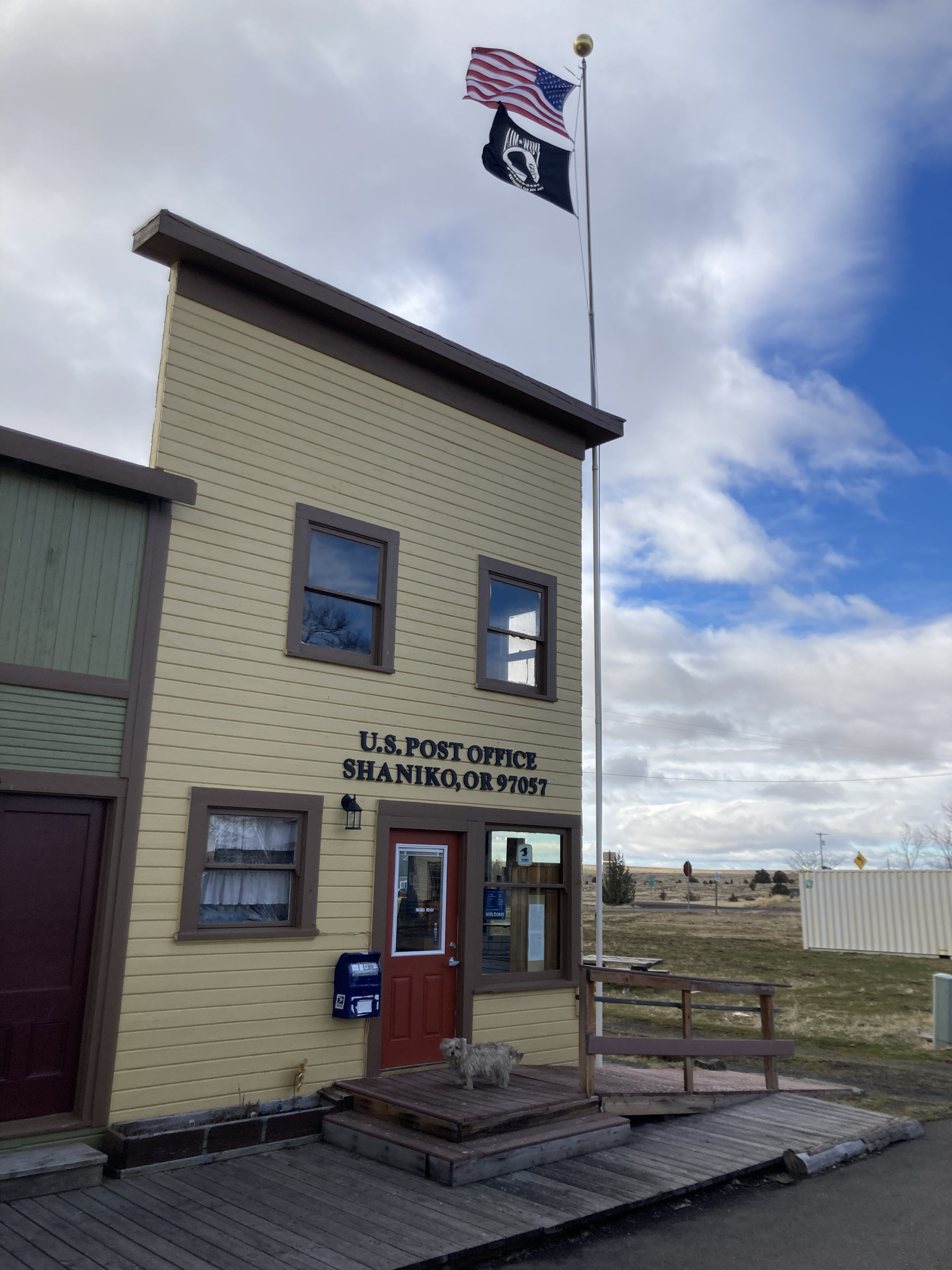
Post Office
