= Joseph Sherar =

American bridge and hotel owner; road builder

Joseph H. Sherar
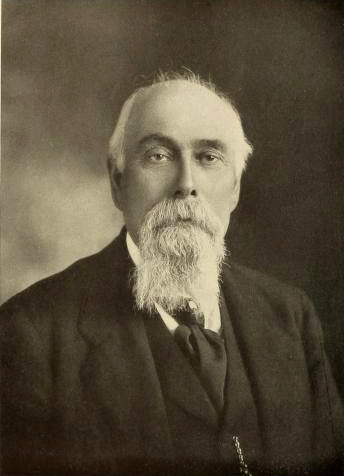
- Joseph Sherar
- Born: November 16, 1833; Vermont, United States
- Died: February 11, 1908 (aged 74); The Dalles, Oregon, U.S.
- Occupations: Bridge owner, stage station and hotel owner, road builder
- Known for: Bridge named after him over the Deschutes River
- Spouse: Jane A. Herbert
- Parent(s): John Sherar and his wife (both from Ireland)

Joseph Sherar (November 16, 1833 – February 11, 1908) was a 19th-century wagon road builder who, with his wife, Jane, owned and operated a Deschutes River toll bridge and a nearby stagecoach station and hotel in Wasco County in the U.S. state of Oregon. The bridge and buildings were slightly downstream of Sherars Falls, the river's lowermost waterfall, and a traditional fishing spot for the native inhabitants of the region.

Sherar improved the bridge and about 60 miles (97 km) of the existing wagon road that crossed it. He and his wife, Jane, operated the Sherar Bridge Hotel from 1871 until their deaths in 1907–08. A concrete bridge has since replaced Sherar's wooden bridge and carries Oregon Route 216 over the river near the waterfall.

== Early life ==
Sherar was born in Vermont in 1833 after his parents had immigrated there from Ireland with their first three children. When he was two years old, the family moved to St. Lawrence County in the U.S. state of New York, where Sherar spent the next 20 years.

In 1855, Sherar left New York and traveled to California, where he tried mining, hauling goods by pack animal, and then farming along the Klamath River before moving to Oregon in 1862. Operating out of The Dalles, Sherar developed a business hauling supplies over primitive trails to mining camps to the southeast. He and his associates are credited with naming several locations, such as Bakeoven, along their route.

In 1863, Sherar married Jane A. Herbert. Born in Illinois in 1848, she had moved to The Dalles with her family in 1850. Selling the pack train business in 1864, the Sherars moved to Dufur, then Tygh Valley.

== Sherars Bridge ==
In 1871, the Sherars bought land and an existing bridge over the Deschutes River, southwest of Grass Valley in Wasco County. They spent about $7,000 for the properties and later spent another $75,000 improving the wagon road leading to it. The bridge site, below Sherars Falls, was an established site for crossing the river, by boat through the 1850s and by bridge after 1860. The waterfall was a traditional fishing site for the Tygh people (Western Sahaptin Indians), who used wooden platforms and dip nets to catch salmon and steelhead migrating upriver.

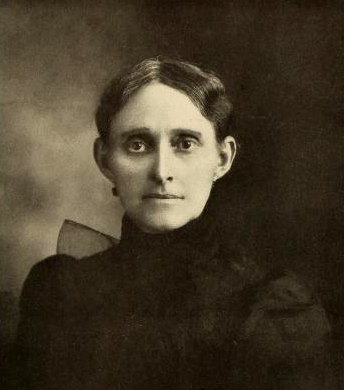
Jane Sherar

Sherar built a stagecoach station and hotel near the bridge, which came to be known as Sherars Bridge. He replaced the existing bridge with a sturdier version, ran it as a toll bridge, and used the income to offset the cost of improving and maintaining the structure. The road, known as The Dalles – Canyon City Wagon Road, was part of what had been used in 1868–70 in the land-grant scheme called The Dalles Military Road. Sherar, employing local Indian laborers, gradually improved the road for 30 miles (48 km) on either side of the river.

By 1893, the Sherar Bridge Hotel had become a three-story, 33-room inn well-known to travelers to and from central Oregon. The bridge remained important throughout the couple's lives. Jane Sherar died in 1907 and Joseph a year later, before railroad traffic along the river made the bridge less important. Subsequent owners kept the hotel open until a fire destroyed it in 1938.

Today, Oregon Route 216 crosses the river over a concrete bridge downstream of Sherars Falls. It is the river's lowermost waterfall, plunging 15 feet (4.6 m) into a horseshoe-shaped trough near the bridge. The waterfall, which is still a tribal fishing site, is on the Warm Springs Indian Reservation.

== Post offices ==
In 1868, Ezra L. Hemingway, an earlier owner of the bridge, had established a post office named Deschutes on land he owned next to the bridge. Joseph Sherar became its postmaster in 1872, and in 1883 the post office was renamed Sherars Bridge or Sherar Bridge. The post office shut down in 1907, reopened in 1922, and was finally closed in 1938.
