= The Dalles Military Road =

The Dalles Military Road, also known as The Dalles – Boise Military Wagon Road, was a mid-19th century wagon road surveyed and barely built by The Dalles Military Road Company between 1868 and 1870. To qualify for government land grants, the company was supposed to build a wagon road from The Dalles, Oregon, to Fort Boise in Idaho. However, the company's road, on which it spent about $6,000 and for which it received nearly 890 square miles (2,300 km^{2}) of public land, consisted largely of existing wagon roads and rudimentary trails. In particular, the company took credit for building a well-traveled and pre-existing wagon road between The Dalles and Canyon City, Oregon.

The company also built a road from Canyon City to the Oregon-Idaho border near Vale, Oregon. The claims of a good wagon road were greatly exaggerated. These claims involved not only the company but Oregon officials, including the governor. The road was used by wagons pulled by oxen or mules to haul food and other supplies to military forts and stations spaced every 30 miles or so along the route.

In 1990, it was still possible to travel nearly the entire length from Canyon City to near Brogan, Oregon, where the route becomes U.S. Route 26, in a stout 4 wheel drive, high clearance vehicle. The visible traces show the hurried building and poor planning. Steep grades, large rocks, poor water control, and swampy areas all contributed to a rough trail. Most of the road is still used by ranchers, fishermen, and hunters. However, modern 4 wheel drive vehicles are much better suited to the rocky climbs and dry stretches . Not much is left of any of the forts east of Canyon City. After the need for the road diminished and then numerous lawsuits, the company went bankrupt and abandoned it to the elements.

Public discontent with the fraud, the road, the land grants, and the way the grant lands were re-sold and managed led to a federal lawsuit about 20 years later. In the suit, the U.S. Attorney General argued that the land had been privatized through fraud and should be returned to the public domain. The suit was dismissed in 1893, when the U.S. Supreme Court agreed with lower courts that since Oregon's governor had certified the road as authentic and complete in 1870, the grants were valid and could not be reversed.

== Route ==
In general, the road followed existing trails and roads, linking The Dalles to Fort Boise. Between the endpoints, the main route passed through or near places such as Antelope, Mitchell, Dayville, Canyon City, Brogan, and Vale, Oregon.

The fraction of the route used by a stage line that began operation in 1864, is referred to simply as The Dalles – Canyon City Wagon Road in the Dictionary of Oregon History which says "numerous freight wagons, pack trains and tramping feet of miners moving to and from the John Day Valley, gradually hammered it into a fairly good road." Points along the road included Sherars Bridge, Burnt Ranch, Antone, and Braggs Ranch, in addition to Mitchell and the end points.

The continuation of the wagon road for which The Dalles Military Road Company claimed credit is shown on an Atlas of Oregon map angling east and southeast from Canyon City, hitting as averred in a later court case about The Dalles Military Road, "the maps or plats referred to in the certificate of the governor showed the line of the pretended road to be 357 miles (575 km)" long.

An article in The New York Times in 1888 cited a letter from William Vilas, the U.S. Secretary of the Interior, who said in part:

The wagon roads have never been built as designated. The lines of the roads as located have in no single instance been approximated by anything fairly resembling construction. Such roads as existed on the lines are the only ones of practicable use, and those lines were not built by wagon road companies... The work done by these companies was little more than to mark lanes where the roads should be... The total amount expended by the Dalles Company was about $6,000... ".

== History ==
The route of The Dalles Military Road generally followed Native American trails that were later used by white explorers such as Peter Skene Ogden and John Work on their travels through northeastern Oregon in the 1820s and early 1830s. In 1860, soldiers led by Enoch Steen developed a military wagon road from Fort Harney, near what later became Burns, to The Dalles. In 1862, more than 1,000 miners entered the region after gold was discovered on Canyon Creek, a tributary of the John Day River. Many of them traveled from the Willamette Valley and Portland to The Dalles, where they followed established routes, including Steen's, to the John Day Valley west of what became Dayville and upstream to Canyon Creek. By 1864, the route was further improved, and mail, supplies, and passengers regularly traveled from The Dalles to Canyon City and the mines. To protect miners and other whites from the native peoples, who had not yet ceded this territory, the Federal government established military forts along the route.

As early as the 1850s, the United States Congress had been giving land to private companies to induce them to build railroads and wagon roads across the West. In the case of what Congress referred to as "military wagon roads", a legal fiction since most were rarely used by the military, land ownership in Oregon was greatly affected. Land grants for the five military wagon roads in the state totaled almost 2.5 million acres (10,000 km^{2}), whereas the total for all other states combined was about 1 million acres (4,000 km^{2}). The other four roads were the Oregon Central Military Wagon Road from Springfield to Fort Boise, authorized in 1865; the Corvallis–Yaquina Bay Military Wagon Road, from Corvallis to Yaquina City (1866); the Willamette Valley and Cascade Mountain Military Wagon Road from Albany to Fort Boise (1866), and the Coos Bay Military Wagon Road from Roseburg to Coos Bay (1869). The Dalles – Fort Boise Military Road was authorized in 1867. Of these five, all but the Corvallis–Yaquina City road are considered to have been "almost total frauds" involving "local speculators" aided by "the connivance of state officials".

Under the rules set by Congress, the land grants in Oregon passed to the state. When a private company completed part of the road, it could petition the Oregon governor to award the company 3 square-mile sections of land for every 1 mile (1.6 km) of finished road. The private company was then free to sell or lease the land. In general, investors in the military roads chose routes through the most valuable land, such as potential farmland along rivers. A group of businessmen, mainly from The Dalles and doing business as The Dalles Military Road Company, chose the well-established route from The Dalles to Canyon City via the John Day River valley and from there to Fort Boise.

The Oregon Legislature awarded the work to the company in late 1868. Governor George L. Woods certified completion of the first 10 miles (16 km) in mid-1869 and completion of the entire route in early 1870. In part, the governor said, "I further certify that I have made a careful examination of said road since its completion, and that the same is built in all respects as required ... and that said road is accepted." Congress approved the land transfers in 1874, and in 1876 The Dalles Military Road Company sold the land to Edward Martin of San Francisco for $125,000 (equivalent to $3.78 million today). Martin's Eastern Oregon Land Company acquired 562,000 acres (2,270 km^{2}) in sections within 3 miles (4.8 km) of either side of the road.

== Legal challenge ==
Public discontent about the privatized land, its high resale price, the lack of road maintenance, and private restrictions on land use and the road itself mounted during subsequent years. In 1885, the Oregon Legislature asked Congress to investigate the original land grant for possible fraud. Subsequently, the U.S. Attorney General filed a bill in equity aimed at forcing The Dalles Military Road Company, the Eastern Oregon Land Company, and other defendants to return the grant lands to the public domain. In 1893, the U.S. Supreme Court, rejecting the Attorney General's arguments, agreed with lower courts that the validity of the land grant was established when Governor Woods certified the road, and the case was dismissed.

In 1904, the Eastern Oregon Land Company offered to sell some of its grant lands in Sherman County, to the Federal government. The land company asked for $60 an acre for batches of quarter section lots totaling no less than 10,000 acres (40 km^{2}) per batch; that is, $600,000 per batch.
