= National Register of Historic Places listings in Wheeler County, Oregon =

Location of Wheeler County in Oregon

This list presents the full set of buildings, structures, objects, sites, or districts designated on the National Register of Historic Places in Wheeler County, Oregon, United States, and offers brief descriptive information about each of them. The National Register recognizes places of national, state, or local historic significance across the United States. Out of over 90,000 National Register sites nationwide, Oregon is home to over 2,000, and 2 of those are found in Wheeler County.

This National Park Service list is complete through NPS recent listings posted March 21, 2025.

== Current listings ==
	Name on the Register	Image	Date listed	Location	City or town	Description
1	Fossil Public School	Fossil Public School	May 22, 2013 (#13000312)	404 Main Street; 45°00′01″N 120°12′46″W	Fossil	A Classical Revival style school building.
2	Thomas Benton Hoover House	Thomas Benton Hoover House	April 14, 1978 (#78002328)	1st Street, between Adams and Washington Streets; 44°59′59″N 120°12′57″W	Fossil	Thomas Benton Hoover, an early Euro-American settler, built this two-story, clapboard house in 1882. He was Fossil's first merchant, mayor, justice of the peace, and postmaster, as well as an early county commissioner and director of schools. He named Fossil for a paleontological find on his property in 1876.

== See also ==
- National Register of Historic Places listings in Oregon
- Listings in neighboring counties: Crook, Gilliam, Grant, Jefferson, Morrow, Wasco
- Historic preservation
- History of Oregon
- Lists of Oregon-related topics
