= Waterman, Oregon =

Unincorporated community in the state of Oregon, United States

- Unincorporated community
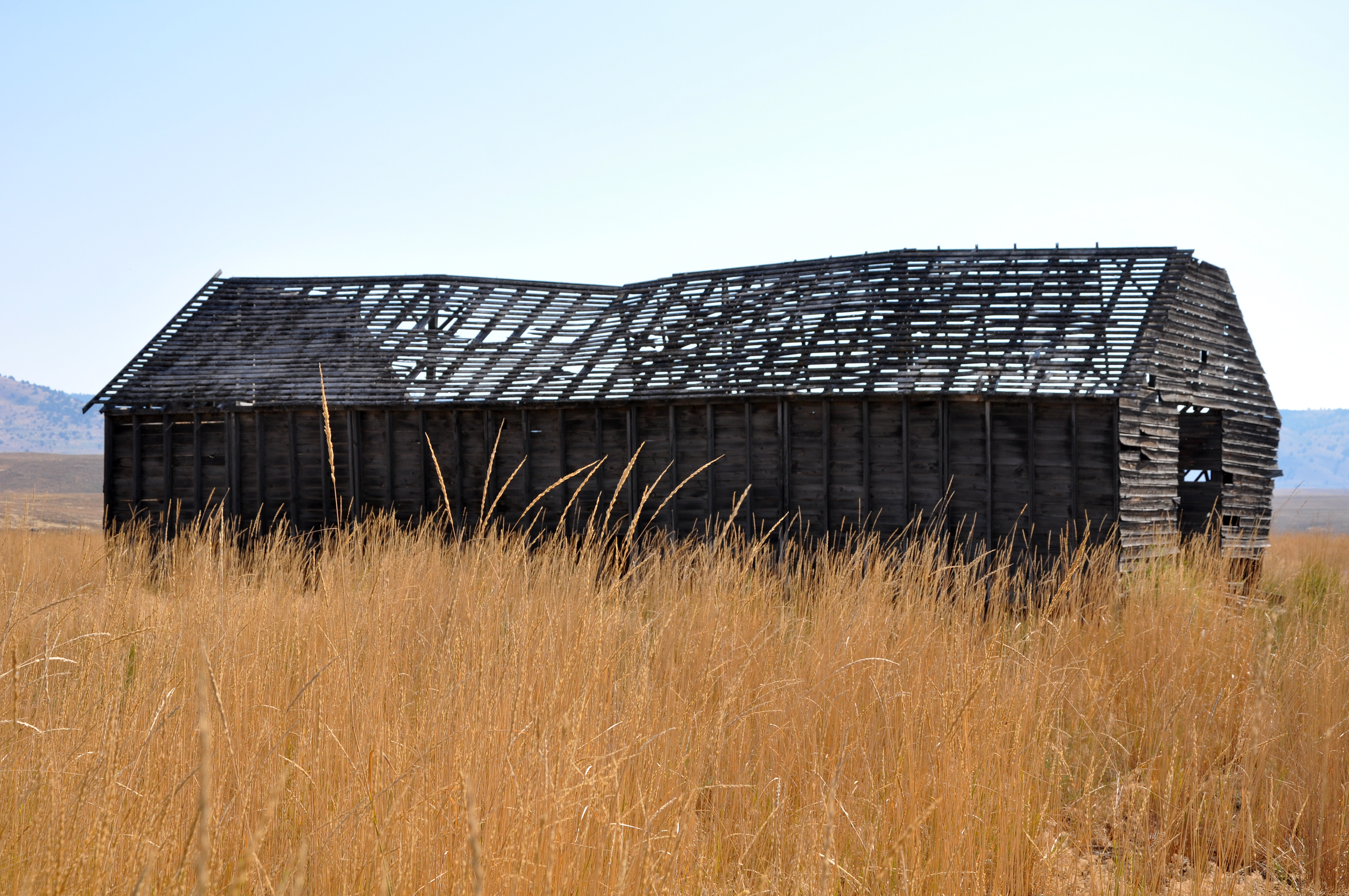
- Derelict building at Waterman

- Location within the state of Oregon Waterman, Oregon (the United States)
- Coordinates: 44°37′10″N 119°53′25″W
- Country: United States
- State: Oregon
- County: Wheeler
- Named for: Ezekial Waterman, who settled here in 1862, or his son, John W. Waterman
- Elevation: 3,947 ft (1,203 m)
- Time zone: UTC-8 (PST)
  - Summer (DST): UTC-7 (PDT)
- Area code: 541
- Coordinates and elevation from United States Geological Survey

Waterman, also known as Waterman Flat, is an unincorporated community in Wheeler County, in the U.S. state of Oregon. Waterman lies southeast of Richmond and northeast of Mitchell at the intersection of Richmond Road, Parrish Creek Road, and Waterman Road. Waterman Road intersects U.S. Route 26 about 10 miles (16 km) south of Waterman. The cattle-ranching community had a post office from 1887 to 1944. Caleb N. Thornburg was the first postmaster.

In the late 19th century, Waterman Flat was a stagecoach stop with a hotel and a livery stable. By 1975, the ruins of a barn were all that remained.
