= Twickenham (disambiguation) =

Twickenham is a town in the Borough of Richmond upon Thames, in west London.

Twickenham may also refer to:

- the former Municipal Borough of Twickenham, which merged into the present London Borough of Richmond upon Thames in 1965
- Twickenham Film Studios
- Twickenham Stadium, a rugby union stadium in Twickenham, England
- Twickenham (UK Parliament constituency)
- Huntsville, Alabama, US, by original name
  - Twickenham Historic District, in Huntsville
- Twickenham, Oregon, US, an unincorporated community in Wheeler County
- HMS Twickenham, a Second World War minesweeper
