= Tom Hoover =

Tom or Thomas Hoover may refer to:

- Tom Hoover (basketball) (born 1941), American basketball player
- Tom Hoover (drag racer) (c. 1941–2022), American drag racer
- Thomas Benton Hoover, owner of the Thomas Benton Hoover House
