= Spray, Oregon =

City in Oregon, U.S.

- City
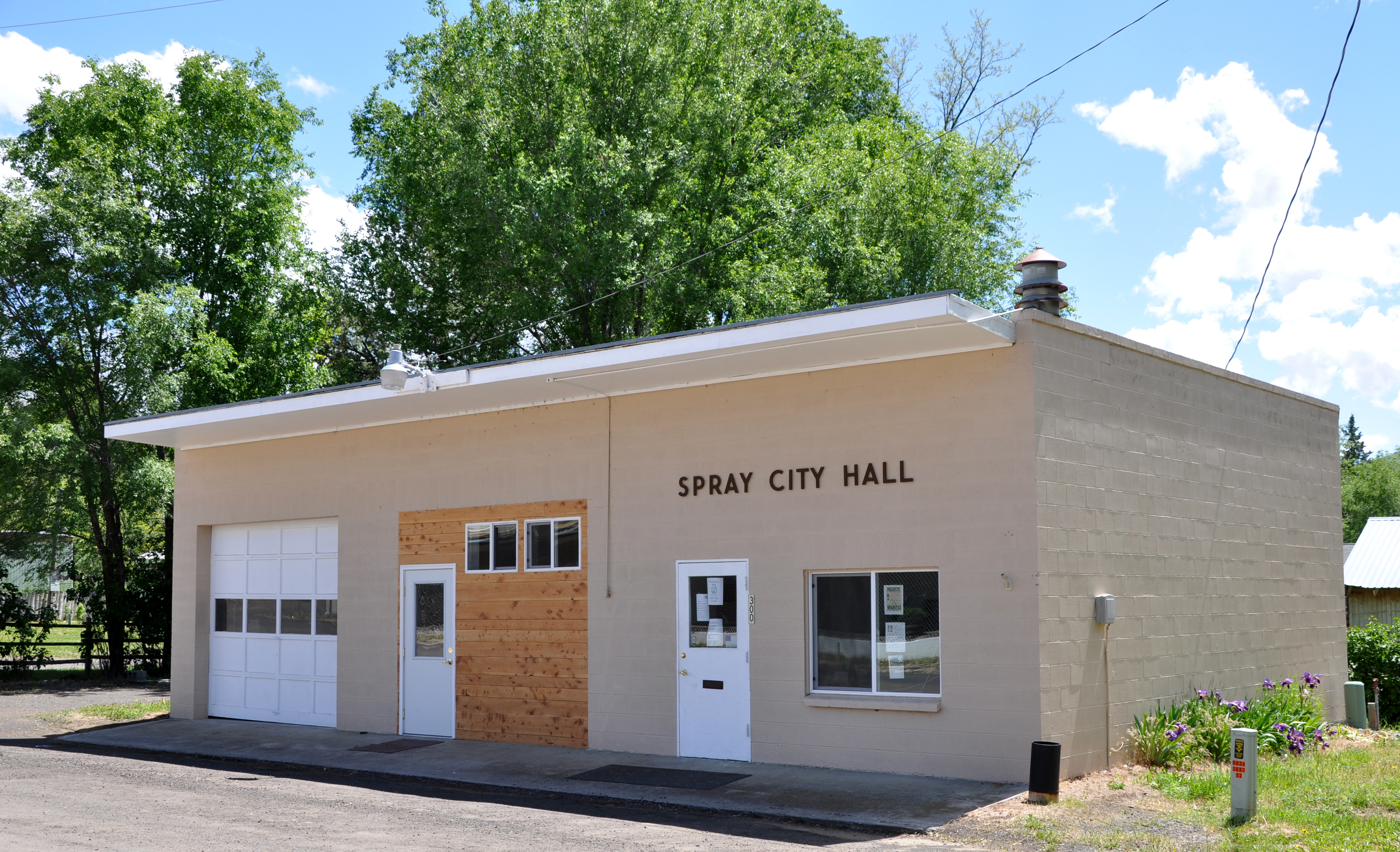
- Spray City Hall in 2011
- Nickname: The City by the River
- Location in Oregon
- Coordinates: 44°49′59″N 119°47′40″W
- Country: United States
- State: Oregon
- County: Wheeler
- Incorporated: 1958
- Named for: John Fremont Spray and Mary E. Spray, early settlers

Government
  - Mayor: Arcadius St. Laurent

Area
  - Total: 0.29 sq mi (0.75 km^{2})
  - Land: 0.29 sq mi (0.75 km^{2})
  - Water: 0 sq mi (0.00 km^{2})
- Elevation: 1,772 ft (540.1 m)

Population (2020)
  - Total: 139
  - Density: 479.9/sq mi (185.28/km^{2})
- Time zone: UTC-8 (Pacific)
  - Summer (DST): UTC-7 (Pacific)
- ZIP code: 97874
- Area code: 541
- FIPS code: 41-69450
- GNIS feature ID: 1127403
- Website: www.sprayoregon.us

Spray is a city in Wheeler County, Oregon, United States. The population was 160 at the 2010 census.

== History ==
Spray was named for John Fremont Spray, the community's founder and first postmaster, and his wife, Mary E. Spray. The post office was established in 1900. In that same year, John Spray established a ferry to carry people across the John Day River, and he helped establish a school and a store in the community.

After formation of Wheeler County in 1899, Spray was suggested as a possible county seat. A county-wide election held in 1900 produced 436 votes for Fossil, 267 for Twickenham, and 82 for Spray. In 1958, Spray became the last Wheeler County community to incorporate as a city. John Butler was the first mayor.

== Geography ==
Spray is located along the John Day River in north-central Oregon. According to the United States Census Bureau, the town has a total area of 0.29 square miles (0.75 km^{2}), all of it land.

Oregon Route 19 and Oregon Route 207, which meet 3 miles (4.8 km) east of Spray, overlap as they pass through the city. Spray is about 30 miles (48 km) southeast of Fossil along Route 19 and about 55 miles (89 km) south of Heppner along Route 207.

=== Climate ===
The average temperature in Spray in January is 33 °F (1 °C), and in July it is 72 °F (22 °C). The highest recorded temperature for Spray was 116 °F (47 °C) in 2007, and the lowest recorded temperature was −26 °F (−32 °C) in 1962. The average wettest month is May.

Climate data for Spray, Oregon
Month	Jan	Feb	Mar	Apr	May	Jun	Jul	Aug	Sep	Oct	Nov	Dec	Year
Mean daily maximum °F (°C)	43 (6)	50 (10)	58 (14)	65 (18)	74 (23)	81 (27)	92 (33)	92 (33)	83 (28)	68 (20)	52 (11)	42 (6)	67 (19)
Mean daily minimum °F (°C)	23 (−5)	25 (−4)	30 (−1)	35 (2)	41 (5)	47 (8)	51 (11)	50 (10)	42 (6)	33 (1)	29 (−2)	23 (−5)	36 (2)
Average precipitation inches (mm)	1.38 (35)	1.22 (31)	1.46 (37)	1.44 (37)	1.75 (44)	1.35 (34)	0.59 (15)	0.61 (15)	0.61 (15)	1.08 (27)	1.54 (39)	1.63 (41)	14.66 (370)

== Demographics ==
Historical population
Census	Pop.	Note	%±
1960	194		—
1970	161		−17.0%
1980	155		−3.7%
1990	149		−3.9%
2000	140		−6.0%
2010	160		14.3%
2020	139		−13.1%
U.S. Decennial Census

=== 2010 census ===
As of the census of 2010, there were 160 people, 69 households, and 49 families residing in the town. The population density was 551.7 inhabitants per square mile (213.0/km^{2}). There were 94 housing units at an average density of 324.1 per square mile (125.1/km^{2}). The racial makeup of the town was 95.0% White, 0.6% Native American, 2.5% Asian, and 1.9% from two or more races. Hispanic or Latino of any race were 0.6% of the population.

There were 69 households, of which 21.7% had children under the age of 18 living with them, 58.0% were married couples living together, 10.1% had a female householder with no husband present, 2.9% had a male householder with no wife present, and 29.0% were non-families. 24.6% of all households were made up of individuals, and 8.7% had someone living alone who was 65 years of age or older. The average household size was 2.22 and the average family size was 2.61.

The median age in the town was 50.3 years. 19.4% of residents were under the age of 18; 6.3% were between the ages of 18 and 24; 18.8% were from 25 to 44; 28.2% were from 45 to 64; and 27.5% were 65 years of age or older. The gender makeup of the town was 49.4% male and 50.6% female.

=== 2000 census ===
As of the census of 2000, there were 140 people, 67 households, and 39 families residing in the city. The population density was 618.7 inhabitants per square mile (238.9/km^{2}). There were 88 housing units at an average density of 388.9 per square mile (150.2/km^{2}). The racial makeup of the city was 97.86% White, 0.71% Asian, and 1.43% from two or more races.

There were 67 households, out of which 14.9% had children under the age of 18 living with them, 55.2% were married couples living together, 3.0% had a female householder with no husband present, and 40.3% were non-families. 34.3% of all households were made up of individuals, and 11.9% had someone living alone who was 65 years of age or older. The average household size was 2.00 and the average family size was 2.55.

In the city, the population was spread out, with 18.6% under the age of 18, 3.6% from 18 to 24, 17.9% from 25 to 44, 27.1% from 45 to 64, and 32.9% who were 65 years of age or older. The median age was 51 years. For every 100 females, there were 112.1 males. For every 100 females age 18 and over, there were 93.2 males.

The median income for a household in the city was $23,250, and the median income for a family was $24,500. Males had a median income of $19,250 versus $20,000 for females. The per capita income for the city was $14,955. There were 11.4% of families and 21.0% of the population living below the poverty line, including 43.5% of under eighteens and 13.2% of those over 64.

== Annual cultural events ==
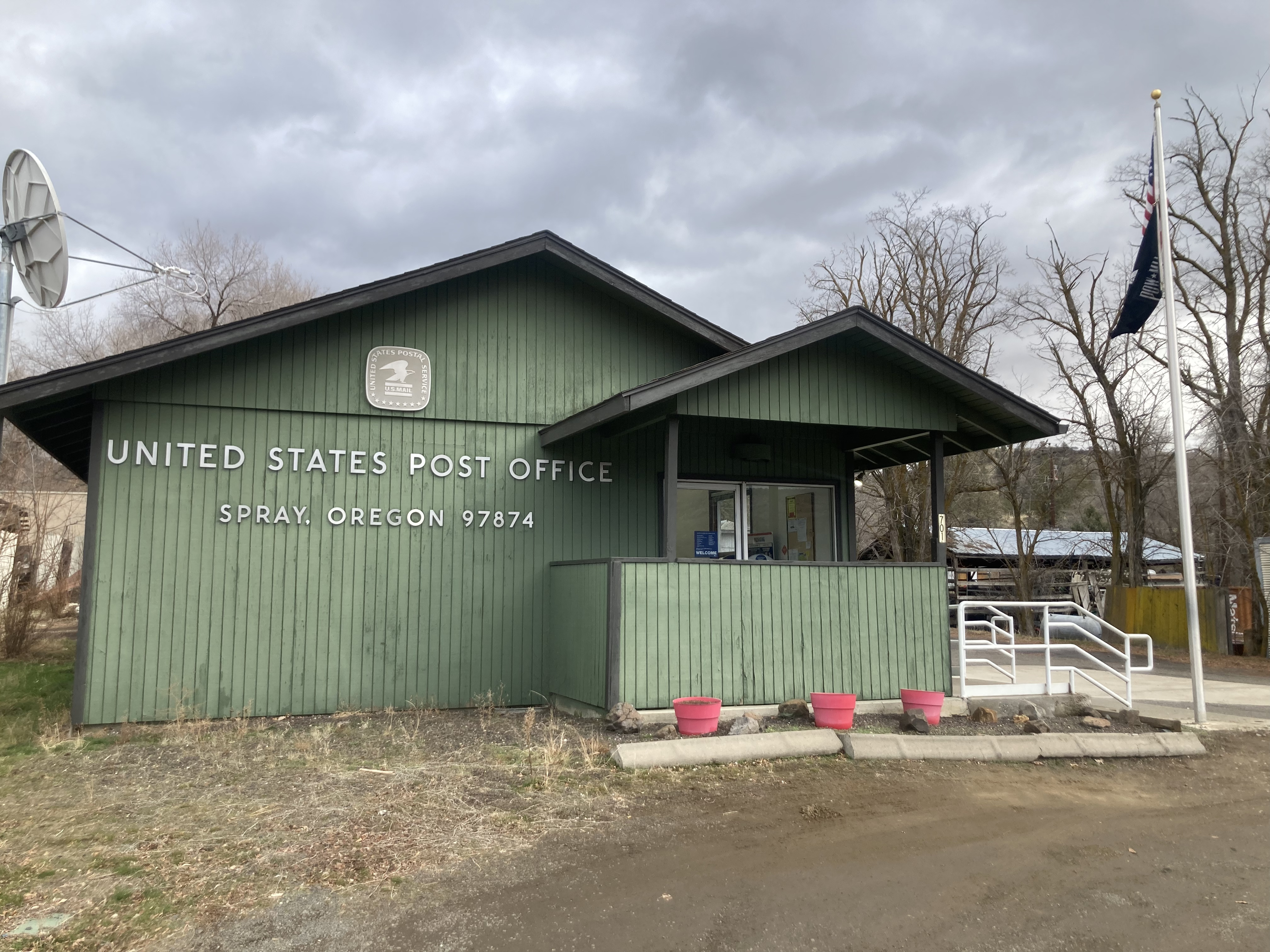
Post Office

Spray features an annual half marathon and rodeo on Memorial Day weekend. The half marathon begins at Service Creek on Saturday and finishes in downtown Spray. The rodeo parade begins roughly three hours later, followed by the rodeo which continues on Sunday. High school graduation also occurs the week before, and the school year ends the week of the rodeo.

== Education ==
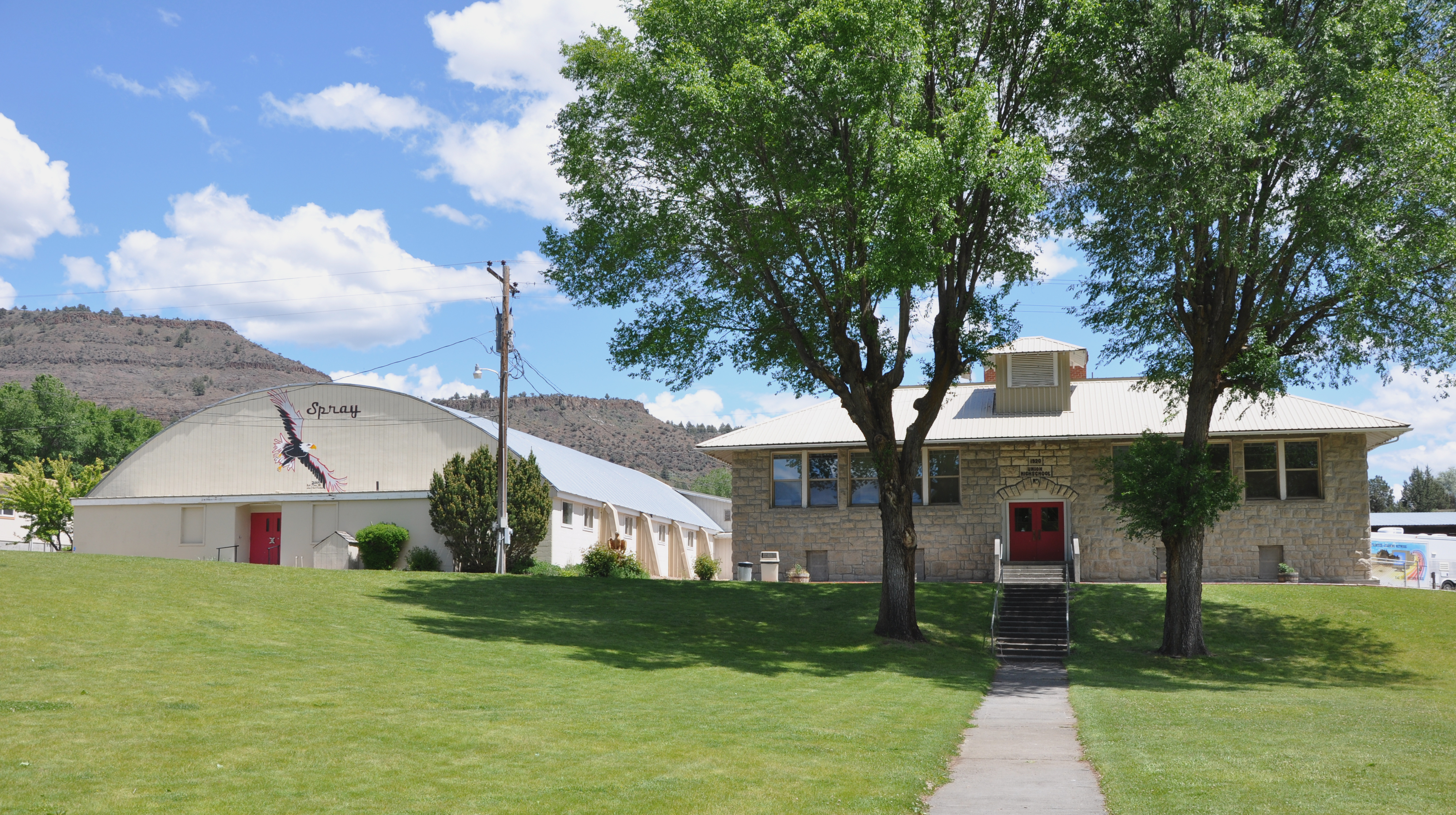
Spray School

Spray School and the Spray School District headquarters are located in the city. In the 2011−12 school year, 44 students were enrolled in grades Kindergarten through 12.

The county is not a part of a community college district.
