= Fossil Public School =

- U.S. National Register of Historic Places
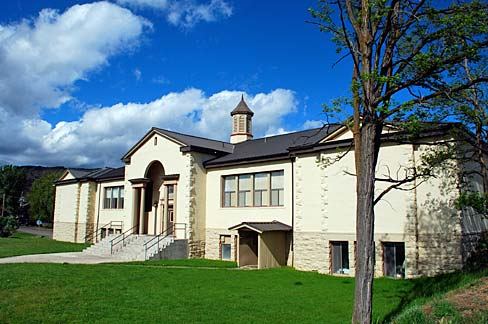

- Location within Oregon Location within the United States
- Location: 404 Main Street, Fossil, Oregon
- Coordinates: 45°00′01″N 120°12′45″W
- Built: 1924
- Architect: DeYoung and Roald Architects
- Architectural style: Classical Revival
- NRHP reference No.: 13000312
- Added to NRHP: May 22, 2013

The Fossil Public School, also known as Wheeler County Public School, is a historic Classical Revival style school in Fossil, Oregon, that is listed on the National Register of Historic Places (NRHP).

Built in 1924, it was designed by architects DeYoung and Roald of Portland and served all grades until 1949, when ninth through twelfth were moved to the new Wheeler High School.

It was listed on the NRHP on May 22, 2013; the listing included the school building and also the gymnasium as another contributing building. It was deemed significant "for the important role it played in the educational development of this rural community since its construction."

The current Fossil Elementary School has about 50 students in kindergarten through eighth grades.

== See also ==
- Wheeler High School (Fossil, Oregon)
