= S. B. Barker Building =

- U.S. National Register of Historic Places
- U.S. Historic district – Contributing property
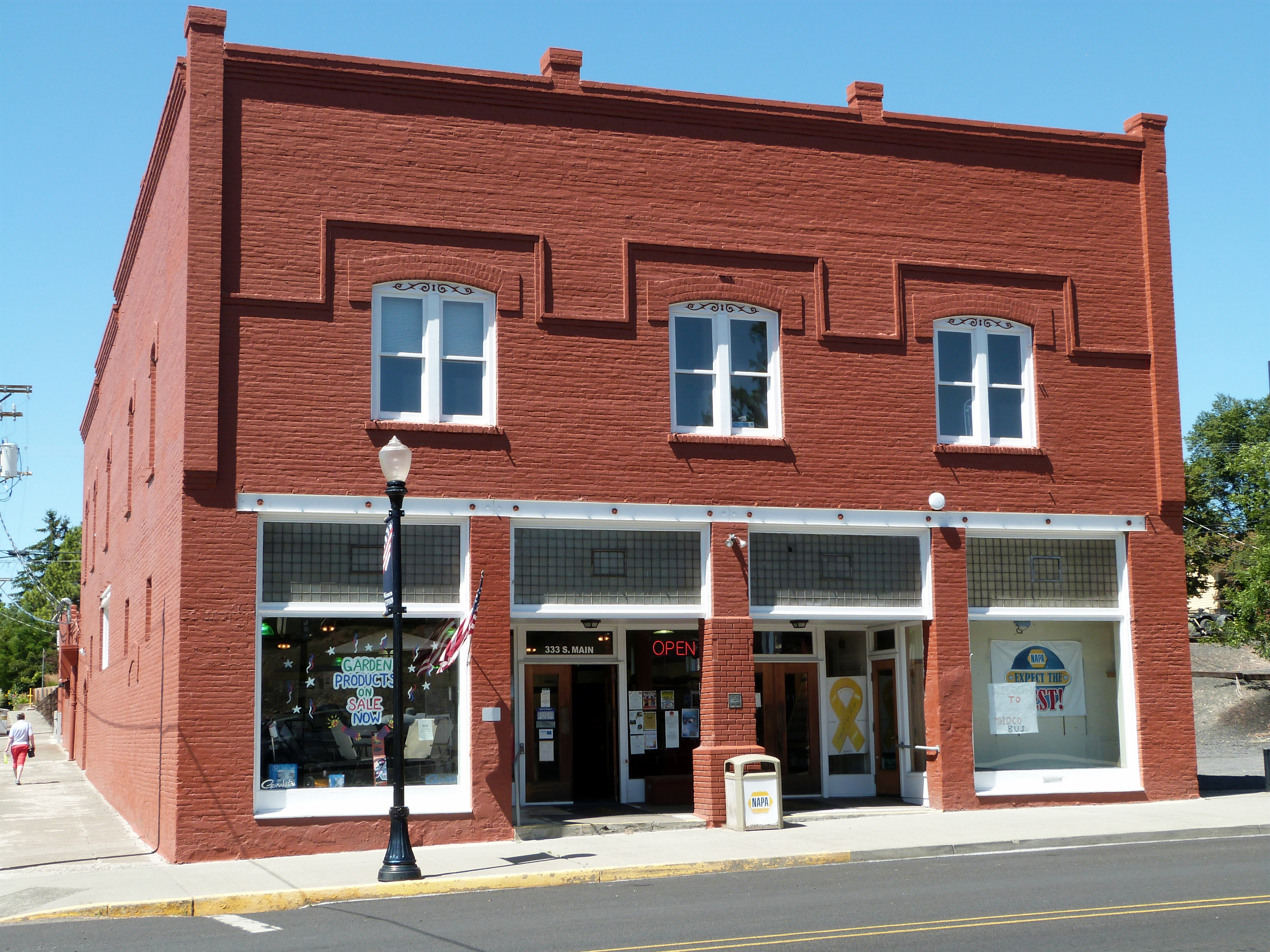
- The Barker Building in 2012
- Location: 333 S. Main Street; Condon, Oregon
- Coordinates: 45°14′04″N 120°11′06″W
- Area: 0.2 acres (0.081 ha)
- Built: 1903
- Architectural style: Italianate
- Part of: Condon Commercial Historic District (ID98000609)
- NRHP reference No.: 89000053
- Added to NRHP: February 21, 1989

The S. B. Barker Building, also known as the Dunn Brothers Building, is a historic commercial building in Condon, Oregon, United States.

Built in 1903 adjacent to a spring at the center of downtown Condon, this Italianate general store typifies the mercantile businesses serving ranches and farms throughout eastern Oregon in the early part of the 20th century.

Its early proprietors, Simon Bradbury Barker (owner 1903–1918) and James Dunn Burns (owner 1926–1968), were leading economic and political figures in Gilliam County, and Barker became a prominent businessman statewide.

Despite its initially central location, the building came to be on the south edge of downtown as the business district migrated north to meet the railroad.

The building was added to the National Register of Historic Places in 1989.

== See also ==
- National Register of Historic Places listings in Gilliam County, Oregon
