= National Register of Historic Places listings in Gilliam County, Oregon =

Location of Gilliam County in Oregon

This list presents the full set of buildings, structures, objects, sites, or districts designated on the National Register of Historic Places in Gilliam County, Oregon, United States, and offers brief descriptive information about each of them. The National Register recognizes places of national, state, or local historic significance across the United States. Out of over 90,000 National Register sites nationwide, Oregon is home to over 2,000, and 3 of those are found in Gilliam County.

This National Park Service list is complete through NPS recent listings posted March 14, 2025.

== Current listings ==
	Name on the Register	Image	Date listed	Location	City or town	Description
1	S. B. Barker Building	S. B. Barker Building	February 21, 1989 (#89000053)	333 S. Main Street; 45°14′04″N 120°11′06″W	Condon	Built in 1903 at the center of downtown Condon, this Italianate general store typifies the mercantile businesses serving ranches and farms throughout eastern Oregon in the early part of the 20th century. Its early proprietors, Simon Bradbury Barker (owner 1903–1918) and James Dunn Burns (owner 1926–1986), were leading economic and political figures in Gilliam County, and Barker became a prominent businessman statewide.
2	Condon Commercial Historic District	Condon Commercial Historic District	May 29, 1998 (#98000609)	Roughly along Main Street between Frazer Street and Spring Street; 45°14′10″N 120°11′05″W	Condon	These 23 downtown structures represent the continuum of Condon's history from its early development as an important agricultural service center, expansion with the coming of the railroad, transformation as the automobile age arrived, and decline in the Great Depression. They show a clear evolution of building type, construction method, and use in parallel with the major phases of the town's development.
3	Silas A. Rice Log House	Silas A. Rice Log House	October 31, 1991 (#91001556)	Oregon Route 19 at Burns Park; 45°14′29″N 120°10′45″W	Condon	This 1884 homesteader cabin is the only hewn-log house remaining in Gilliam County from the period of American settlement, and one of few left in the Columbia Plateau. It was built in the same year Condon was platted and about 2 miles (3.2 km) away. Beginning in 1987, it was relocated to a museum site and comprehensively restored.

== See also ==
- National Register of Historic Places listings in Oregon
- Listings in neighboring counties: Klickitat, Morrow, Sherman, Wasco, Wheeler
- Historic preservation
- History of Oregon
- Lists of Oregon-related topics
