= Twickenham, Oregon =

Unincorporated community in the state of Oregon, United States

- Unincorporated community
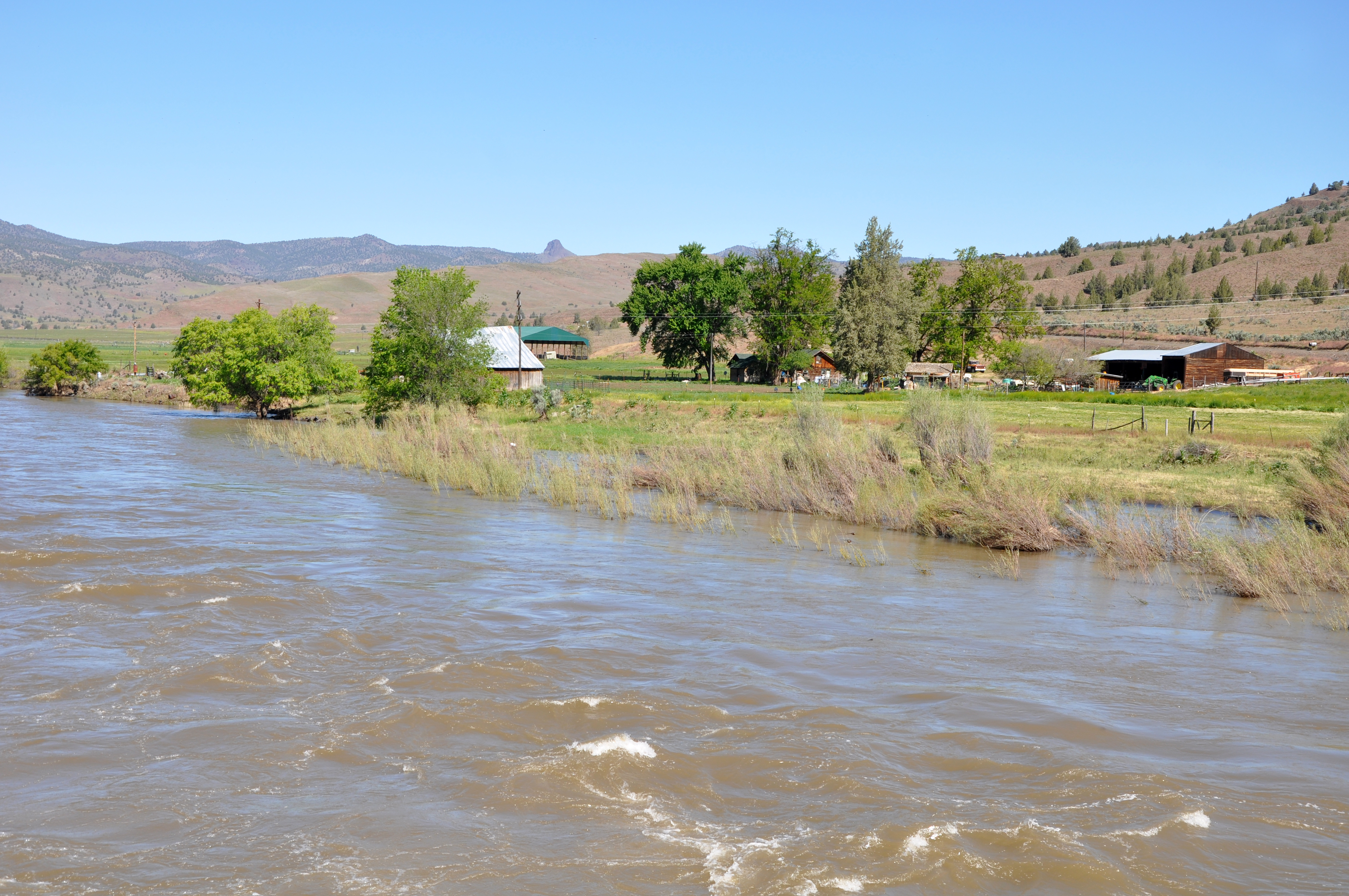
- Twickenham along the John Day River

- Location within the state of Oregon Twickenham, Oregon (the United States)
- Coordinates: 44°44′37″N 120°10′19″W
- Country: United States
- State: Oregon
- County: Wheeler
- Named for: Twickenham, a suburb of London, England
- Elevation: 1,562 ft (476 m)
- Time zone: UTC-8 (PST)
  - Summer (DST): UTC-7 (PDT)
- Area code: 541
- Coordinates and elevation from United States Geological Survey

Twickenham is an unincorporated community in Wheeler County, in the U.S. state of Oregon. It is located along the John Day River between Service Creek and Mitchell, Oregon. A bridge at Twickenham carries North Twickenham Road over the river.

The locality was originally named Contention after a quarrel between two of its prominent residents. The Contention post office opened in 1886. A daughter of one of the residents involved in the quarrel suggested that the name Twickenham, after the now-London suburb in England, would be more dignified than Contention. As it happened, the Contention post office closed in 1895, and a Twickenham post office opened in 1896 in the same general vicinity. It closed in 1917, and mail to Twickenham thereafter has been sent via Fossil, about 20 miles (32 km) to the north.

After formation of Wheeler County in 1899, Twickenham was suggested as a possible county seat. A county-wide election held in 1900 produced 436 votes for Fossil, 267 for Twickenham, and 82 for Spray. At the time, Twickenham had a store, hotel, blacksmith shop, and a ferry across the river.
