= List of Oregon locations by per capita income =

Oregon's Per Capita Income Distribution by County

Total Oregon per capita income (wikidata:Q824) = 35,393 US$ (2020 survey methodology)
(WD = Wikidata page)

[Hide/show County Per Capita Income]
| No. | Oregon | per capita income US$ | year |
|---|---|---|---|
| 1 | Baker County, Oregon | 29,615 | 2020^{WD} |
| 2 | Benton County, Oregon | 35,305 | 2020^{WD} |
| 3 | Clackamas County, Oregon | 42,638 | 2020^{WD} |
| 4 | Clatsop County, Oregon | 31,631 | 2020^{WD} |
| 5 | Columbia County, Oregon | 32,438 | 2020^{WD} |
| 6 | Coos County, Oregon | 30,720 | 2020^{WD} |
| 7 | Crook County, Oregon | 29,923 | 2020^{WD} |
| 8 | Curry County, Oregon | 32,125 | 2020^{WD} |
| 9 | Deschutes County, Oregon | 37,615 | 2020^{WD} |
| 10 | Douglas County, Oregon | 27,484 | 2020^{WD} |
| 11 | Gilliam County, Oregon | 26,911 | 2020^{WD} |
| 12 | Grant County, Oregon | 29,449 | 2020^{WD} |
| 13 | Harney County, Oregon | 26,279 | 2020^{WD} |
| 14 | Hood River County, Oregon | 35,904 | 2020^{WD} |
| 15 | Jackson County, Oregon | 32,044 | 2020^{WD} |
| 16 | Jefferson County, Oregon | 26,177 | 2020^{WD} |
| 17 | Josephine County, Oregon | 27,026 | 2020^{WD} |
| 18 | Klamath County, Oregon | 26,508 | 2020^{WD} |
| 19 | Lake County, Oregon | 26,299 | 2020^{WD} |
| 20 | Lane County, Oregon | 30,911 | 2020^{WD} |
| 21 | Lincoln County, Oregon | 30,336 | 2020^{WD} |
| 22 | Linn County, Oregon | 27,820 | 2020^{WD} |
| 23 | Malheur County, Oregon | 19,893 | 2020^{WD} |
| 24 | Marion County, Oregon | 28,856 | 2020^{WD} |
| 25 | Morrow County, Oregon | 24,655 | 2020^{WD} |
| 26 | Multnomah County, Oregon | 41,612 | 2020^{WD} |
| 27 | Polk County, Oregon | 31,957 | 2020^{WD} |
| 28 | Sherman County, Oregon | 34,548 | 2020^{WD} |
| 29 | Tillamook County, Oregon | 30,044 | 2020^{WD} |
| 30 | Umatilla County, Oregon | 25,452 | 2020^{WD} |
| 31 | Union County, Oregon | 27,748 | 2020^{WD} |
| 32 | Wallowa County, Oregon | 34,564 | 2020^{WD} |
| 33 | Wasco County, Oregon | 31,088 | 2020^{WD} |
| 34 | Washington County, Oregon | 41,015 | 2020^{WD} |
| 35 | Wheeler County, Oregon | 23,628 | 2020^{WD} |
| 36 | Yamhill County, Oregon | 32,768 | 2020^{WD} |

The following is a list of Oregon counties and places in order of per capita income. Oregon has the twenty-third highest per capita income in the United States of America, at $20,940 (2000). Its personal per capita income is $29,340 (2003).

== Counties ranked by per-capita income ==
Note: Data is from the 2010 United States Census Data and the 2006-2010 American Community Survey 5-Year Estimates.

| Rank | County | Per capita income | Median household income | Median family income | Population | Number of households |
|---|---|---|---|---|---|---|
| 1 | Clackamas | $31,785 | $62,007 | $74,905 | 375,992 | 145,790 |
| 2 | Washington | $30,522 | $62,574 | $76,778 | 529,710 | 200,934 |
| 3 | Multnomah | $28,883 | $49,618 | $62,956 | 735,334 | 304,540 |
| 4 | Deschutes | $27,920 | $53,071 | $61,605 | 157,733 | 64,090 |
| | United States | $27,334 | $51,914 | $62,982 | 308,745,538 | 116,716,292 |
| 5 | Benton | $26,177 | $48,012 | $71,763 | 85,579 | 34,317 |
| | Oregon | $26,171 | $49,260 | $60,402 | 3,831,074 | 1,518,938 |
| 6 | Gilliam | $25,559 | $42,148 | $52,885 | 1,871 | 864 |
| 7 | Clatsop | $25,347 | $42,223 | $52,339 | 37,039 | 15,742 |
| 8 | Columbia | $24,613 | $55,199 | $62,728 | 49,351 | 19,183 |
| 9 | Jackson | $24,410 | $44,142 | $53,739 | 203,206 | 83,076 |
| 10 | Lincoln | $24,354 | $39,738 | $52,730 | 46,034 | 20,550 |
| 11 | Polk | $24,345 | $50,975 | $61,418 | 75,403 | 28,288 |
| 12 | Yamhill | $24,017 | $52,485 | $61,524 | 99,193 | 34,726 |
| 13 | Hood River | $23,930 | $51,307 | $57,644 | 22,346 | 8,173 |
| 14 | Lane | $23,869 | $42,923 | $55,817 | 351,715 | 145,966 |
| 15 | Curry | $23,842 | $37,469 | $53,340 | 22,364 | 10,417 |
| 16 | Wallowa | $23,023 | $41,116 | $49,961 | 7,008 | 3,133 |
| 17 | Union | $22,947 | $42,162 | $52,558 | 25,748 | 10,501 |
| 18 | Tillamook | $22,824 | $39,412 | $50,779 | 25,250 | 10,834 |
| 19 | Lake | $22,586 | $41,105 | $47,188 | 7,895 | 3,378 |
| 20 | Crook | $22,275 | $46,059 | $52,477 | 20,978 | 8,558 |
| 21 | Linn | $22,165 | $45,832 | $55,320 | 116,672 | 45,204 |
| 22 | Klamath | $22,081 | $41,818 | $51,596 | 66,380 | 27,280 |
| 23 | Grant | $22,041 | $35,974 | $43,521 | 7,445 | 3,352 |
| 24 | Coos | $21,981 | $37,491 | $46,569 | 63,043 | 27,133 |
| 25 | Wasco | $21,922 | $42,133 | $50,279 | 25,213 | 10,031 |
| 26 | Marion | $21,915 | $46,069 | $54,661 | 315,335 | 112,957 |
| 27 | Sherman | $21,688 | $41,354 | $52,361 | 1,765 | 777 |
| 28 | Baker | $21,683 | $39,704 | $50,507 | 16,134 | 7,040 |
| 29 | Josephine | $21,539 | $38,035 | $48,180 | 82,713 | 34,646 |
| 30 | Douglas | $21,342 | $39,711 | $48,729 | 107,667 | 44,581 |
| 31 | Harney | $20,849 | $39,036 | $46,626 | 7,422 | 3,205 |
| 32 | Wheeler | $20,598 | $33,403 | $43,167 | 1,441 | 651 |
| 33 | Morrow | $20,201 | $43,902 | $49,868 | 11,173 | 3,916 |
| 34 | Umatilla | $20,035 | $45,861 | $53,585 | 75,889 | 26,904 |
| 35 | Jefferson | $20,009 | $41,425 | $48,818 | 21,720 | 7,790 |
| 36 | Malheur | $16,335 | $39,144 | $46,136 | 31,313 | 10,411 |

== See also ==
- Lists of Oregon-related topics
