= Wheeler High School (Fossil, Oregon) =

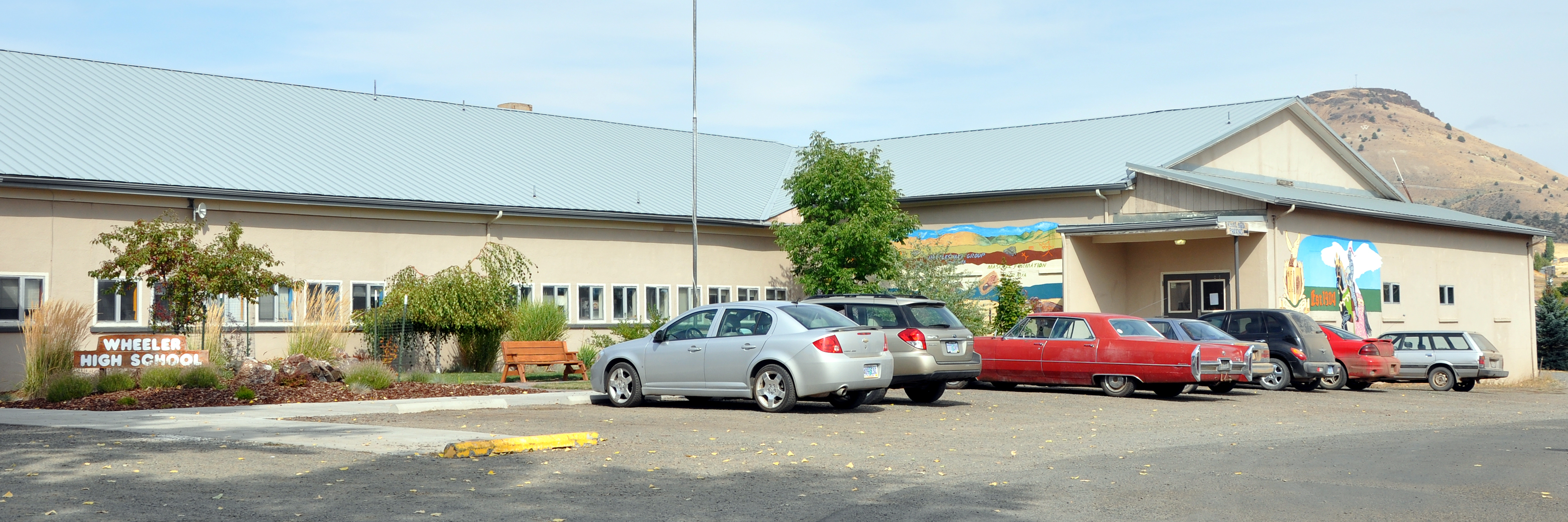

Location
- 600 B Street; Fossil, Wheeler County, Oregon 97830; United States; 45.00149°N 120.2134°W

Information
- Type: Public
- Opened: 1901
- School district: Fossil School District
- Principal: Jon McMurray
- Grades: 7–12
- Enrollment: ~50
- Colors: Black and gold
- Athletics conference: OSAA Big Sky League 1A-6
- Mascot: Falcons, Rattlers
- Rival: Condon High School
- Website: www.fossilschools.com/wheeler-high-school.html

Wheeler High School is a public high school in Fossil, Oregon, United States. It is in the Fossil School District, and competes jointly with Spray and Mitchell school as the Spray-Mitchell-Wheeler Rattlers.

== Academics ==
In 2008, 100 percent of the school's seniors received their high school diploma. Of six students, six graduated and none dropped out.

In 2021, 100 percent of the school's seniors dropped out. The school's only student dropped out.

== Fossil beds ==
Wheeler High School also contains fossil beds containing fossils of plants like sycamore, maples, oaks, roses, and alder from the Oligocene (33 million years ago) and they are open to the public including fossil collecting.
