= Spray School District =

Spray School
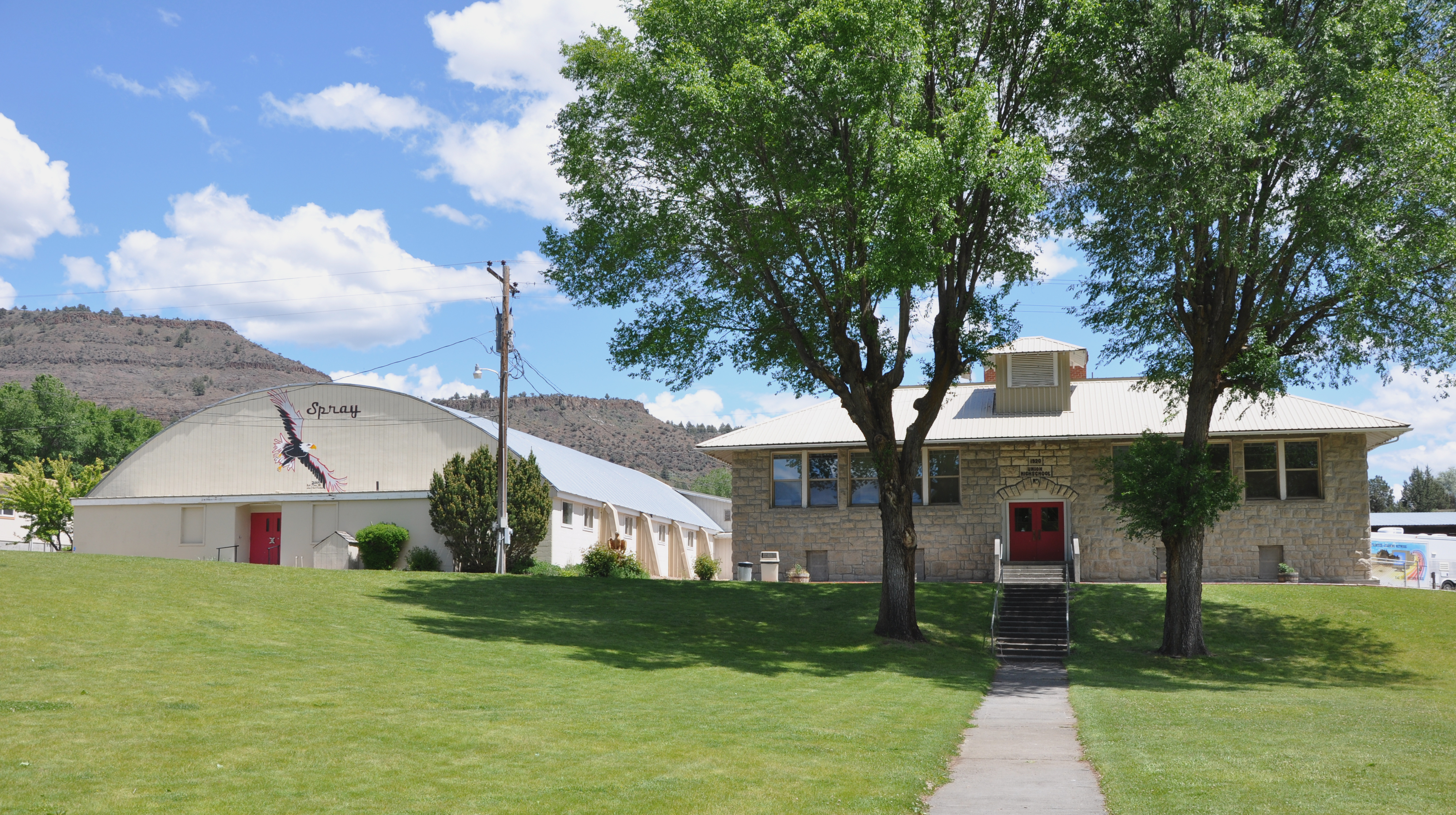

Location
- 303 Park Avenue; Spray, Wheeler County, Oregon 97874; United States; 44.834431°N 119.792781°W

Information
- Type: Public
- School district: Spray School District
- Principal: Phil Starkey
- Grades: K-12
- Enrollment: 44
- Colors: Red, white, and silver
- Athletics conference: OSAA Big Sky League 1A-6
- Mascot: Eagles
- Website: www.spray.k12.or.us

Spray School is a K-12 public school in Spray, Oregon, United States. The only school in the Spray School District, its campus consists of five buildings that house classrooms for students in kindergarten through grade 12, administrative offices, a café, a library, a media center, a woodshop, and a gymnasium. Across the street from the campus is a district-run dormitory for up to six high-school pupils, most of whom are exchange students.

Forty-four students from a district covering 605 square miles (1,570 km^{2}) are enrolled at Spray School for 2011–12. The district employs seven teachers, two instructional assistants, and one administrator.

== History ==
In 1969 the school had 25 high school students, making it one of the smallest high school programs in Oregon.

== Academics ==
In 2008, 89 percent of the school's seniors received their high school diploma. Of 9 students, 8 graduated, 0 dropped out, and 1 was still in high school.

== Campus ==
The boarding facility has a cost of $100 per month per student for people resident in the United States.
