= Richmond, Oregon =

Unincorporated community in the state of Oregon, United States

- Unincorporated community
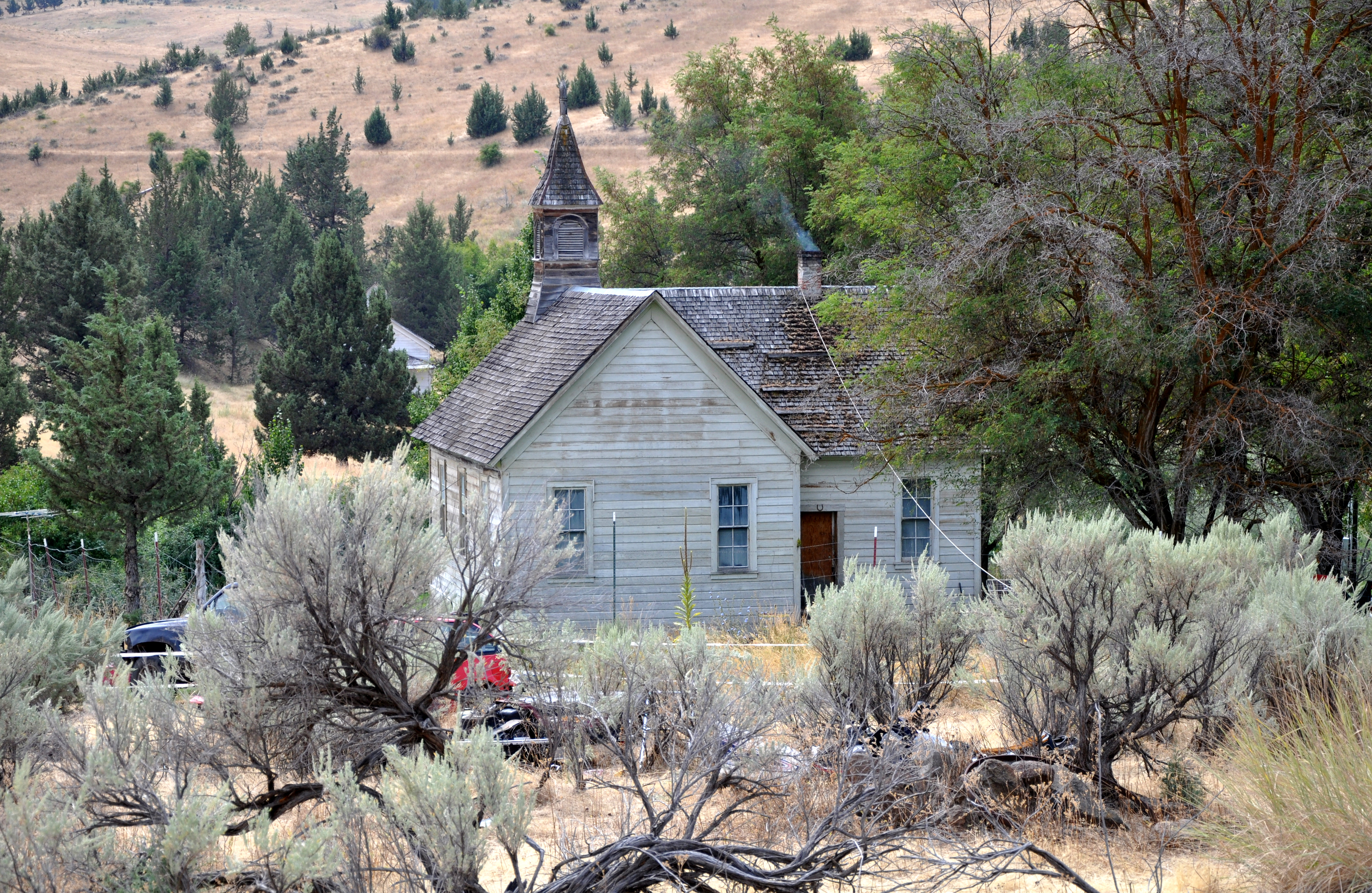
- Old church in Richmond

- Location within the state of Oregon Richmond, Oregon (the United States)
- Coordinates: 44°43′51″N 119°59′32″W
- Country: United States
- State: Oregon
- County: Wheeler
- Named for: Richmond, Virginia
- Elevation: 3,215 ft (980 m)
- Time zone: UTC-8 (PST)
  - Summer (DST): UTC-7 (PDT)
- Area code: 541
- Coordinates and elevation from United States Geological Survey

Richmond is an unincorporated community in Wheeler County, in the U.S. state of Oregon. Richmond lies on Richmond Road southeast of its intersection with Oregon Route 207 between Mitchell and Service Creek. The community had a post office from 1899 to 1952.

R. N. Donnelly gave the community its name in response to an argument with another pioneer resident, William Walters, about where to build a school. Donnelly called Walters "Jeff Davis" because he viewed Walters as rebellious and associated him with the rebels of the Confederate States of America and their president Jefferson Davis. Donnelly named the site "Richmond" after the capital city of the Confederacy.

Buildings in Richmond included the school, a store, a Methodist Church, an Independent Order of Odd Fellows hall, and several homes, all later abandoned. In 1901 nearly 450 people attended the annual meeting of the Wheeler County Pioneer Association in Richmond.
