= List of counties in Oregon =

Counties of Oregon
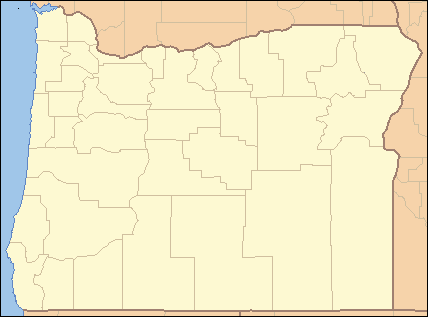
- Location: State of Oregon
- Number: 36
- Populations: 1,472 (Wheeler) – 795,391 (Multnomah)
- Areas: 435 square miles (1,130 km^{2}) (Multnomah) – 10,135 square miles (26,250 km^{2}) (Harney)
- Government: County government
- Subdivisions: Cities, townships, unincorporated communities, Indian reservations, census-designated places

There are 36 counties in the U.S. state of Oregon. The Oregon Constitution does not explicitly provide for county seats; Article VI, covering the "Administrative Department" of the state of Oregon, simply states that:

All county and city officers shall keep their respective offices at such places therein, and perform such duties, as may be prescribed by law.

More details on the etymologies of Oregon county names and place names in general are documented in Oregon Geographic Names. Oregon's postal abbreviation is OR and its FIPS state code is 41.

Oregon counties by date of establishment 1840–1849 1850–1859 1860–1869 1870–1889 After 1890

== County information ==
The Federal Information Processing Standard (FIPS) code, which is used by the United States government to uniquely identify counties, is provided with each entry. The FIPS code for each county links to census data for that county.

County	FIPS code	County seat	Est.	Origin	Etymology	Population	Area	Map
Baker County	001	Baker City	September 22, 1862	Eastern portion of Wasco County	Named in honor of Edward Dickinson Baker, who died in combat while serving as Oregon senator.	16,658	3,068 sq mi (7,946 km^{2})	State map highlighting Baker County
Benton County	003	Corvallis	December 23, 1847	Polk County	Named for Thomas Hart Benton, senator and advocate of U.S. annexation of the Oregon Country.	97,728	676 sq mi (1,751 km^{2})	State map highlighting Benton County
Clackamas County	005	Oregon City	July 5, 1843	One of the original four districts of the Oregon Country	Named for the Clackamas people, a local Native American tribe.	426,280	1,868 sq mi (4,838 km^{2})	State map highlighting Clackamas County
Clatsop County	007	Astoria	December 19, 1845	Northern and western portions of the original Twality District	Named for the Clatsop, a local Native American tribe.	40,926	827 sq mi (2,142 km^{2})	State map highlighting Clatsop County
Columbia County	009	Saint Helens	January 16, 1854	Northern half of Washington County	Named for the neighboring Columbia River.	54,091	657 sq mi (1,702 km^{2})	State map highlighting Columbia County
Coos County	011	Coquille	December 22, 1853	Western parts of Umpqua and Jackson Counties	Named for the Coos people, a regional Native American group.	63,992	1,600 sq mi (4,144 km^{2})	State map highlighting Coos County
Crook County	013	Prineville	October 24, 1882	Southern part of Wasco County	Named for George Crook, a Union army officer in the Civil War and Indian Wars.	27,564	2,980 sq mi (7,718 km^{2})	State map highlighting Crook County
Curry County	015	Gold Beach	December 18, 1855	Coos County	Named for George Law Curry, governor of the Oregon Territory.	22,621	1,627 sq mi (4,214 km^{2})	State map highlighting Curry County
Deschutes County	017	Bend	February 1, 1917	Southern part of Crook County	Named for the Deschutes River from French Riviere des Chutes, 'River of the falls'.	213,072	3,018 sq mi (7,817 km^{2})	State map highlighting Deschutes County
Douglas County	019	Roseburg	January 7, 1852	Portion of Umpqua County which lay east of the Coast Range summit	Named for senator Stephen A. Douglas, a supporter of Oregon's admission to the union.	111,951	5,037 sq mi (13,046 km^{2})	State map highlighting Douglas County
Gilliam County	021	Condon	February 25, 1885	Eastern third of Wasco County	Named for Oregon pioneer Cornelius Gilliam (1798–1848).	1,971	1,204 sq mi (3,118 km^{2})	State map highlighting Gilliam County
Grant County	023	Canyon City	October 14, 1864	Parts of old Wasco and old Umatilla counties	Named for Ulysses S. Grant prior to his election as president, in recognition of his military service.	7,075	4,529 sq mi (11,730 km^{2})	State map highlighting Grant County
Harney County	025	Burns	February 25, 1889	Southern two-thirds of Grant County	Named in honor of cavalry officer William S. Harney.	7,380	10,135 sq mi (26,250 km^{2})	State map highlighting Harney County
Hood River County	027	Hood River	June 23, 1908	Northwest portion of Wasco County	Named for the Hood River.	23,720	522 sq mi (1,352 km^{2})	State map highlighting Hood River County
Jackson County	029	Medford	January 12, 1852	Southwestern portion of Lane County and unorganized area south of Douglas and Umpqua Counties.	Named for President Andrew Jackson.	221,795	2,785 sq mi (7,213 km^{2})	State map highlighting Jackson County
Jefferson County	031	Madras	December 12, 1914	Crook County	Named for the adjacent Mount Jefferson, itself named for President Thomas Jefferson.	25,740	1,781 sq mi (4,613 km^{2})	State map highlighting Jefferson County
Josephine County	033	Grants Pass	January 22, 1856	Western half of Jackson County	Named for Virginia "Josephine" Rollins, the first female settler in the area.	87,867	1,640 sq mi (4,248 km^{2})	State map highlighting Josephine County
Klamath County	035	Klamath Falls	October 20, 1882	Western part of Lake County	Named for the Klamath people, a local Native American tribe.	70,274	5,945 sq mi (15,397 km^{2})	State map highlighting Klamath County
Lake County	037	Lakeview	October 24, 1874	Jackson and Wasco Counties	Named for the large number of local lakes and springs.	8,187	7,940 sq mi (20,565 km^{2})	State map highlighting Lake County
Lane County	039	Eugene	January 28, 1851	Southern part of Linn County and the portion of Benton County east of Umpqua County	Named for Joseph Lane, the first governor of the Oregon Territory.	381,584	4,554 sq mi (11,795 km^{2})	State map highlighting Lane County
Lincoln County	041	Newport	February 20, 1893	Western portion of Benton County and Polk County	Named for President Abraham Lincoln.	50,636	980 sq mi (2,538 km^{2})	State map highlighting Lincoln County
Linn County	043	Albany	December 28, 1847	Southern portion of Champoeg (later Marion) County	Named for Lewis F. Linn, sponsor of the Donation Land Act.	132,843	2,291 sq mi (5,934 km^{2})	State map highlighting Linn County
Malheur County	045	Vale	April 1, 1887	Southern portion of Baker County	Named for the Malheur River, itself from French Riviere au Malheur, 'Unfortunate River', named by French fur trappers whose belongings were stolen along the river.	32,261	9,888 sq mi (25,610 km^{2})	State map highlighting Malheur County
Marion County	047	Salem	July 5, 1843	One of the original four districts of the Oregon territory	Named for Francis Marion (1732-1795), a Revolutionary War general.	355,777	1,185 sq mi (3,069 km^{2})	State map highlighting Marion County
Morrow County	049	Heppner	February 16, 1885	Western portion of Umatilla County and a small portion of eastern Wasco County	Named for state representative Jackson L. Morrow, an advocate for the formation of the county.	12,602	2,033 sq mi (5,265 km^{2})	State map highlighting Morrow County
Multnomah County	051	Portland	December 22, 1854	Eastern part of Washington and the northern part of Clackamas counties	Named for the Multnomah people, a Chinookan band from Sauvie Island.	795,391	435 sq mi (1,127 km^{2})	State map highlighting Multnomah County
Polk County	053	Dallas	December 22, 1845	Yamhill District	Named for President James Knox Polk, who was serving during the county's creation.	90,037	741 sq mi (1,919 km^{2})	State map highlighting Polk County
Sherman County	055	Moro	February 25, 1889	Northeast corner of Wasco County	Named for Union general William Tecumseh Sherman.	2,051	823 sq mi (2,132 km^{2})	State map highlighting Sherman County
Tillamook County	057	Tillamook	December 15, 1853	Clatsop, Yamhill and Polk Counties	Named for the Tillamook people, a Native American tribe.	27,384	1,102 sq mi (2,854 km^{2})	State map highlighting Tillamook County
Umatilla County	059	Pendleton	September 27, 1862	Central portion of Wasco County	Named for the adjacent Umatilla River, derived from a Sahaptin, word possibly meaning laughing waters.	81,119	3,215 sq mi (8,327 km^{2})	State map highlighting Umatilla County
Union County	061	La Grande	October 14, 1864	Baker County	Named for the town of Union, itself named for the Union during the Civil War.	25,900	2,037 sq mi (5,276 km^{2})	State map highlighting Union County
Wallowa County	063	Enterprise	February 11, 1887	Eastern portion of Union County.	Named after the Nez Perce wallowa, a tripod of poles used to support fish nets.	7,595	3,145 sq mi (8,146 km^{2})	State map highlighting Wallowa County
Wasco County	065	The Dalles	January 11, 1854	Parts of Clackamas, Lane, Linn and Marion counties	Named for the Wasco people, a Native American tribe.	26,310	2,381 sq mi (6,167 km^{2})	State map highlighting Wasco County
Washington County	067	Hillsboro	July 5, 1843	One of the original four districts of the Oregon Country (as Twality District)	Named for President George Washington.	611,708	724 sq mi (1,875 km^{2})	State map highlighting Washington County
Wheeler County	069	Fossil	February 17, 1899	Grant County, Gilliam County, and Crook County	Named for Henry H. Wheeler, an early Oregon mail carrier.	1,472	1,715 sq mi (4,442 km^{2})	State map highlighting Wheeler County
Yamhill County	071	McMinnville	July 5, 1843	One of the original four districts of the Oregon Country	Named for the Yamhill band of Kalapuya, a local Native American group.	110,024	716 sq mi (1,854 km^{2})	State map highlighting Yamhill County

== See also ==
- Umpqua County, Oregon (historic)
- Oregon locations by per capita income
- List of U.S. county secession proposals#Oregon
- Lists of Oregon-related topics
