= Thomas Benton Hoover House =

Historic house in Oregon, United States

- U.S. National Register of Historic Places
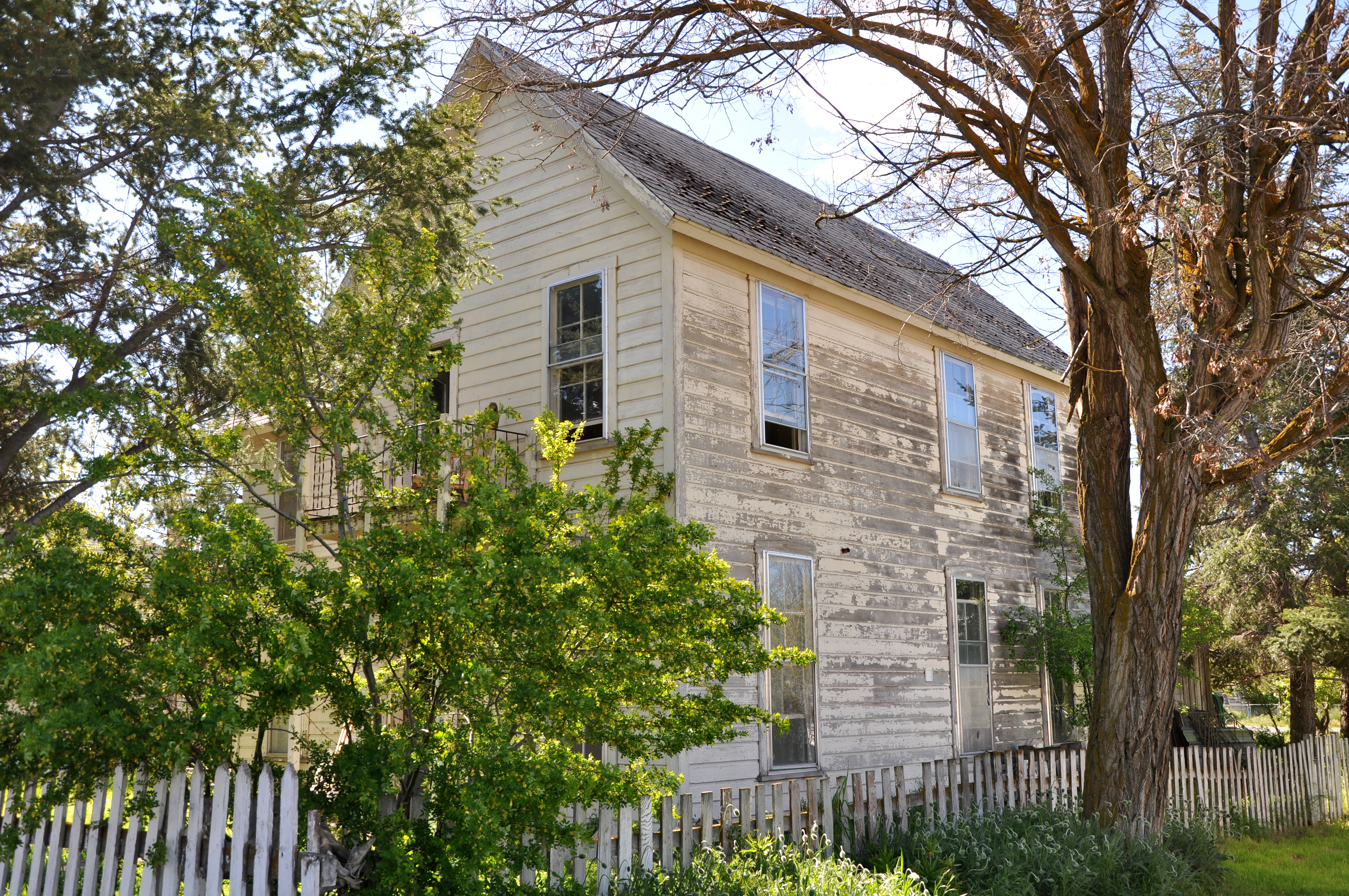
- The Hoover House in 2011
- Location: First Street between Adams and Washington streets, Fossil, Oregon
- Coordinates: 44°59′59″N 120°12′57″W
- Area: 0.375 acres (1,520 m^{2})
- Built: 1882
- NRHP reference No.: 78002328
- Added to NRHP: April 14, 1978

The Thomas Benton Hoover House is a historic house located in Fossil, Oregon, United States. The house is constructed in two stories with clapboarded outer walls. It was built in 1882 by Thomas Benton Hoover, an early Euro-American settler and prominent Fossil citizen. Hoover was Fossil's first merchant (along with a partner), mayor, justice of the peace, and postmaster, as well as an early county commissioner and director of schools. He named Fossil for a paleontological find on his property in 1876.

The house was listed on the National Register of Historic Places in 1978.

== See also ==
- National Register of Historic Places listings in Wheeler County, Oregon
