= Henry H. Wheeler =

Pioneer who established first major transport line in Central Oregon

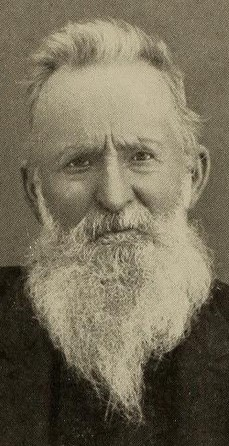
- Henry Wheeler circa 1905
- Born: September 7, 1826; Erie County, Pennsylvania, US
- Died: March 26, 1915 (aged 88); Mitchell, Oregon, US
- Burial place: Lower Mitchell Cemetery; 44.569957°N 120.165453°W
- Occupation: Stage Coach Operator
- Known for: Establishing first major transportation line in Central Oregon
- Spouse: Dorcas L Monroe Wheeler
- Children: Clara Wheeler

Henry H. Wheeler was a pioneer in Oregon during the mid-19th century. He established the first major transportation line in Central Oregon by connecting the towns of The Dalles and Canyon City via a stage coach line. Wheeler County, in which his stage coach line passed through and where he lived in his retirement, was named in his honor.

== Biography ==
Henry H. Wheeler was born and raised in Pennsylvania by his parents, James and Maggie Wheeler. There he received his education.

Wheeler left for Sacramento, California, in 1857 as part of the California Gold Rush. After an unsuccessful attempt at mining, he worked in a sawmill for several years until 1862, when he set out for The Dalles in Oregon and then the Salmon River mines in Idaho. After several further attempts at striking gold in Oregon, Idaho, and California, he set forth to The Dalles and established a stage coach line between The Dalles and Canyon City on the first of May, 1864. This was the first major transportation line created in Central Oregon.

Wheeler's stage coach line initially carried just passengers. However, in the spring of 1865, he acquired a contract with the US Postal Service to carry mail as well. He also carried mail for the Wells Fargo Express. He charged the, when fully loaded, eleven passengers 40 dollars ($841.30 in 2025) for the nearly one 180 mile long one-way trip from The Dalles to Canyon City. Additionally, Wheeler received twelve thousand dollars ($252,391 in 2025) per year from his mail contract.

On the seventh of September 1866, Wheeler and a Wells Fargo messenger, H. C. Page, were travelling alone along the Bridge Creek Road (modern day U.S. Route 26), about three miles west of where Mitchell, Oregon would soon be founded, when they were attacked by a group of between fifteen to twenty Snake Indians. Caught by surprise, Wheeler was shot by one of the Snake in the face. Wheeler and Page were forced to flee on horseback to a nearby ranch then back to The Dalles where he got medical treatment for his gunshot wound. He returned later to where he was robbed to find that the Indians had taken valuables such as the jewelry, leather, and 300 dollars in coins he was carrying. However, they did not take the nearly ten thousand dollars worth of paper money also on board.

Wheeler faced many other similar cases of robbery and attacks from both Native Americans and White settlers in the four years he operated his stage coach line. He lost thousands of dollars in both money and goods and numerous horses to thieves. Wheeler sold his stage coach line in 1868 and engaged in other business ventures in Central Oregon.

Wheeler bought an estate six miles out from Mitchell and entered into retirement there. In 1873, he married Miss Dorcas Monroe and had one child; Clara Wheeler. He never fully recovered from the jaw injury he sustained in September 1866. On the third of March, 1915, Henry Wheeler died in his home.

== Legacy ==
Wheeler County, Oregon, in which Henry Wheeler operated his stage coach line and lived during his retirement was named in his honor.
