= Fossil, Oregon =

- City
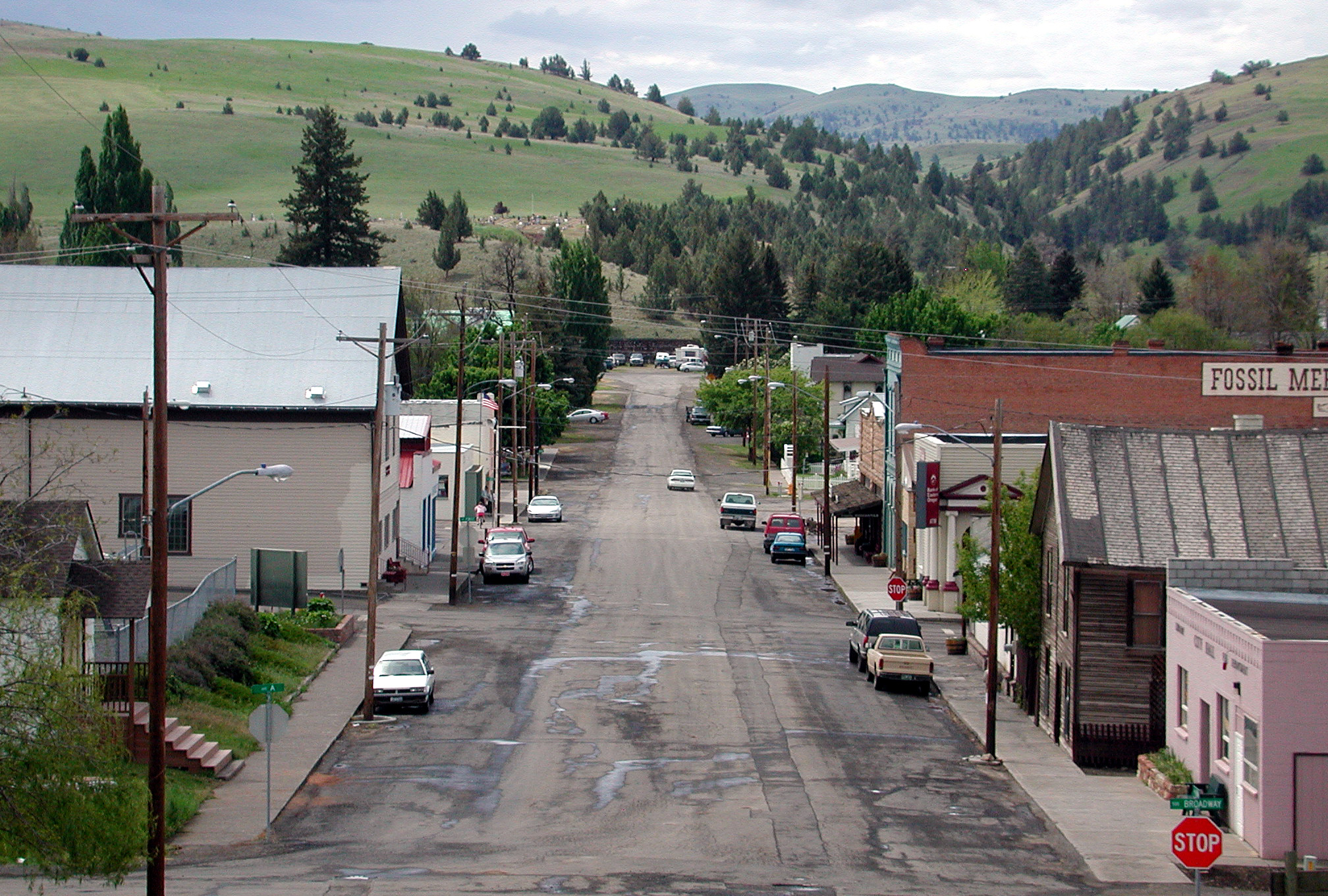
- Main Street

- Location in Oregon
- Coordinates: 44°59′53″N 120°12′58″W
- Country: United States
- State: Oregon
- County: Wheeler
- Incorporated: 1891

Government
  - Mayor: Carol E. MacInnes

Area
  - Total: 0.78 sq mi (2.03 km^{2})
  - Land: 0.78 sq mi (2.03 km^{2})
  - Water: 0 sq mi (0.00 km^{2})
- Elevation: 2,654 ft (809 m)

Population (2020)
  - Total: 447
  - Density: 570.4/sq mi (220.23/km^{2})
- Time zone: UTC−8 (Pacific)
  - Summer (DST): UTC−7 (Pacific)
- ZIP code: 97830
- Area codes: 541, 458
- FIPS code: 41-26650
- GNIS feature ID: 1120903

Fossil is a city in and the county seat of Wheeler County, Oregon, United States. The name was chosen by the first postmaster, Thomas B. Hoover, who had found some fossil remains on his ranch. As of the 2020 census, Fossil had a population of 447.

== History ==
The Fossil post office was established on February 28, 1876, on Thomas Benton Hoover's ranch along Hoover Creek. He named the place Fossil after finding fossils in a clay-like rock formation on his ranch. In 1881, Hoover and Thomas Watson opened a store near the confluence of Butte and Cottonwood creeks and moved the post office to the store. When the city was incorporated in 1891, Hoover became the first mayor.

After creating Wheeler County in 1899, the Oregon Legislature chose Fossil as the temporary county seat. A county-wide election held in 1900 to determine the permanent county seat yielded 436 votes for Fossil, 267 for Twickenham, and 82 for Spray.

Winlock W. Steiwer and George S. Carpenter founded Steiwer & Carpenter Bank, the first bank in the city and the county. By the early 20th century in addition to the bank, Fossil had a flour mill, a blacksmith shop, a drug store, a jewelry and optical store, a livery stable, and three stores with general merchandise. In the 1920s, William Jennings Bryan was one of the guest speakers at a Chautauqua meeting in Fossil. Later in the decade the John Day Valley Coal & Oil Company drilled an exploratory oil well within the city limits, but it was not successful.

== Geography and climate ==
Fossil is the county seat of Wheeler County. According to the United States Census Bureau, the city has a total area of 0.79 square miles (2.05 km^{2}), all of it land.

Fossil is located in north-central Oregon at the intersection of Oregon Route 19 with Oregon Route 218. Butte Creek, a tributary of the John Day River, flows through the city. The Clarno Unit of the John Day Fossil Beds National Monument is 18 miles (29 km) west of the city along Route 218. The city is about 30 miles (48 km) northwest of Spray and about 20 miles (32 km) south of Condon along Route 19. By highway, Bend, to the southwest, is about a two-hour drive from Fossil, and Portland, to the west, is about a three-hour drive.

The average temperature in Fossil in January is 34.0 °F or 1.1 °C, and in August it is 64.5 °F or 18.1 °C. The highest recorded temperature for Fossil was 111 °F (43.9 °C) on July 29, 2003, while the lowest recorded temperature was −26 °F (−32.2 °C) on January 26, 1957. According to the Köppen climate classification system, Fossil has a warm-summer Mediterranean climate (Köppen Csb).

Climate data for Fossil, Oregon, 1991–2020 normals, extremes 1945–present
Month	Jan	Feb	Mar	Apr	May	Jun	Jul	Aug	Sep	Oct	Nov	Dec	Year
Record high °F (°C)	70 (21)	76 (24)	78 (26)	87 (31)	100 (38)	108 (42)	111 (44)	106 (41)	100 (38)	98 (37)	75 (24)	70 (21)	111 (44)
Mean maximum °F (°C)	59.7 (15.4)	61.8 (16.6)	67.8 (19.9)	75.4 (24.1)	84.3 (29.1)	91.1 (32.8)	98.1 (36.7)	96.6 (35.9)	90.7 (32.6)	79.8 (26.6)	65.9 (18.8)	56.9 (13.8)	99.6 (37.6)
Mean daily maximum °F (°C)	42.2 (5.7)	46.1 (7.8)	52.2 (11.2)	57.9 (14.4)	66.3 (19.1)	73.0 (22.8)	84.5 (29.2)	84.2 (29.0)	74.3 (23.5)	62.8 (17.1)	48.1 (8.9)	40.6 (4.8)	61.0 (16.1)
Daily mean °F (°C)	34.0 (1.1)	35.8 (2.1)	40.0 (4.4)	44.6 (7.0)	51.8 (11.0)	57.5 (14.2)	65.0 (18.3)	64.5 (18.1)	57.1 (13.9)	48.1 (8.9)	38.3 (3.5)	32.5 (0.3)	47.4 (8.6)
Mean daily minimum °F (°C)	25.8 (−3.4)	25.5 (−3.6)	27.8 (−2.3)	31.3 (−0.4)	37.3 (2.9)	41.9 (5.5)	45.5 (7.5)	44.7 (7.1)	39.9 (4.4)	33.4 (0.8)	28.4 (−2.0)	24.3 (−4.3)	33.8 (1.0)
Mean minimum °F (°C)	10.9 (−11.7)	11.9 (−11.2)	19.7 (−6.8)	23.2 (−4.9)	28.0 (−2.2)	34.4 (1.3)	38.4 (3.6)	38.3 (3.5)	32.1 (0.1)	21.4 (−5.9)	16.3 (−8.7)	10.8 (−11.8)	1.2 (−17.1)
Record low °F (°C)	−26 (−32)	−22 (−30)	2 (−17)	12 (−11)	15 (−9)	25 (−4)	25 (−4)	28 (−2)	18 (−8)	3 (−16)	−16 (−27)	−24 (−31)	−26 (−32)
Average precipitation inches (mm)	1.40 (36)	1.17 (30)	1.51 (38)	1.35 (34)	2.12 (54)	1.32 (34)	0.44 (11)	0.58 (15)	0.55 (14)	1.47 (37)	1.38 (35)	1.76 (45)	15.05 (383)
Average snowfall inches (cm)	1.9 (4.8)	1.4 (3.6)	0.4 (1.0)	0.1 (0.25)	0.1 (0.25)	0.0 (0.0)	0.0 (0.0)	0.0 (0.0)	0.0 (0.0)	0.3 (0.76)	1.1 (2.8)	1.8 (4.6)	7.1 (18.06)
Average precipitation days (≥ 0.01 in)	4.9	4.7	5.7	5.4	6.2	4.4	1.8	1.6	2.4	5.0	5.9	3.9	51.9
Average snowy days (≥ 0.1 in)	0.7	0.6	0.3	0.1	0.1	0.0	0.0	0.0	0.0	0.1	0.3	1.0	3.2
Source 1: NOAA (snow/snow days 1981–2010)
Source 2: National Weather Service

== Demographics ==
Historical population
Census	Pop.	Note	%±
1880	100		—
1890	153		53.0%
1900	288		88.2%
1910	421		46.2%
1920	519		23.3%
1930	538		3.7%
1940	532		−1.1%
1950	645		21.2%
1960	672		4.2%
1970	511		−24.0%
1980	535		4.7%
1990	399		−25.4%
2000	469		17.5%
2010	473		0.9%
2020	447		−5.5%

=== 2020 census ===
As of the 2020 census, Fossil had a population of 447. The median age was 57.4 years. 13.6% of residents were under the age of 18 and 39.1% of residents were 65 years of age or older. For every 100 females there were 93.5 males, and for every 100 females age 18 and over there were 91.1 males age 18 and over.

0% of residents lived in urban areas, while 100.0% lived in rural areas.

There were 228 households in Fossil, of which 18.9% had children under the age of 18 living in them. Of all households, 40.8% were married-couple households, 25.0% were households with a male householder and no spouse or partner present, and 30.7% were households with a female householder and no spouse or partner present. About 36.9% of all households were made up of individuals and 27.6% had someone living alone who was 65 years of age or older.

There were 264 housing units, of which 13.6% were vacant. Among occupied housing units, 66.2% were owner-occupied and 33.8% were renter-occupied. The homeowner vacancy rate was <0.1% and the rental vacancy rate was 6.1%.

Racial composition as of the 2020 census
Race	Number	Percent
White	389	87.0%
Black or African American	0	0%
American Indian and Alaska Native	19	4.3%
Asian	3	0.7%
Native Hawaiian and Other Pacific Islander	0	0%
Some other race	2	0.4%
Two or more races	34	7.6%
Hispanic or Latino (of any race)	21	4.7%

=== 2010 census ===
As of the census of 2010, there were 473 people, 224 households, and 124 families residing in the city. The population density was 598.7 inhabitants per square mile (231.2/km^{2}). There were 265 housing units at an average density of 335.4 per square mile (129.5/km^{2}). The racial makeup of the city was 92.4% White, 2.7% Native American, 0.8% Asian, 0.8% from other races, and 3.2% from two or more races. Hispanic or Latino of any race were 2.3% of the population.

There were 224 households, of which 18.8% had children under the age of 18 living with them, 43.3% were married couples living together, 9.4% had a female householder with no husband present, 2.7% had a male householder with no wife present, and 44.6% were non-families. 40.2% of all households were made up of individuals, and 22.3% had someone living alone who was 65 years of age or older. The average household size was 2.04 and the average family size was 2.75.

The median age in the city was 56.1 years. 18.6% of residents were under the age of 18; 4.7% were between the ages of 18 and 24; 14.2% were from 25 to 44; 30.5% were from 45 to 64; and 32.1% were 65 years of age or older. The gender makeup of the city was 49.0% male and 51.0% female.

=== 2000 census ===
At the 2000 census, the median income for a household in the city was $30,250, and the median income for a family was $37,125. Males had a median income of $29,688 versus $20,893 for females. The per capita income for the city was $16,236. About 12.0% of families and 12.0% of the population were below the poverty line, including 9.2% of those under age 18 and 3.3% of those age 65 or over.

== Arts and culture ==
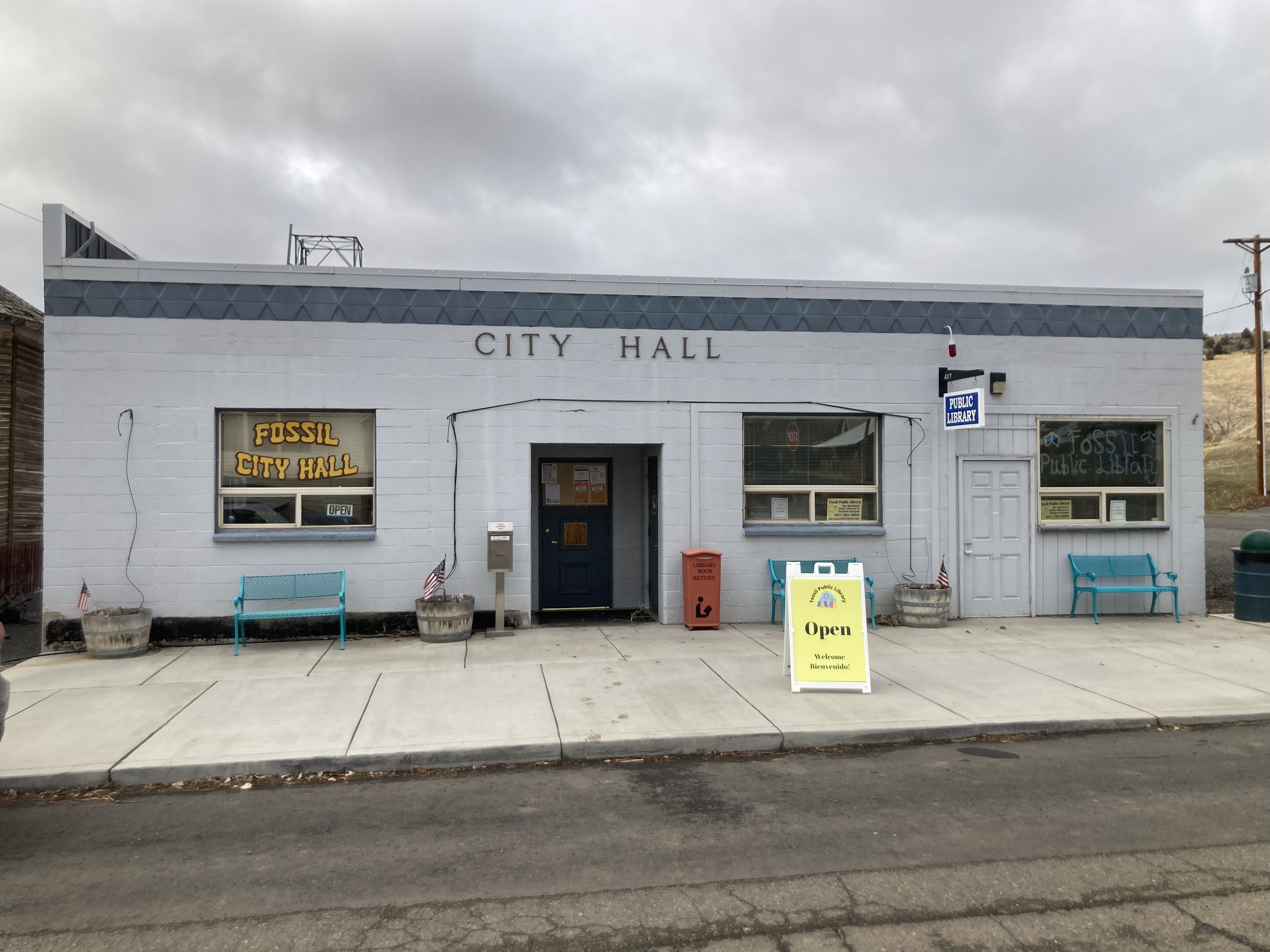
City Hall and library

=== Annual events ===
During the second weekend in August, Fossil hosts the Wheeler County Fair and Rodeo; on the first weekend of July the Wheeler County Bluegrass Festival is held on the courthouse lawn. For more than 30 years, the American Bikers Aimed Toward Education (ABATE) of Oregon has held motorcycle rallies in the area in late May. Golf tournaments are held each year at a six-hole golf course at Kinzua, near Fossil.

=== Museums and other points of interest ===
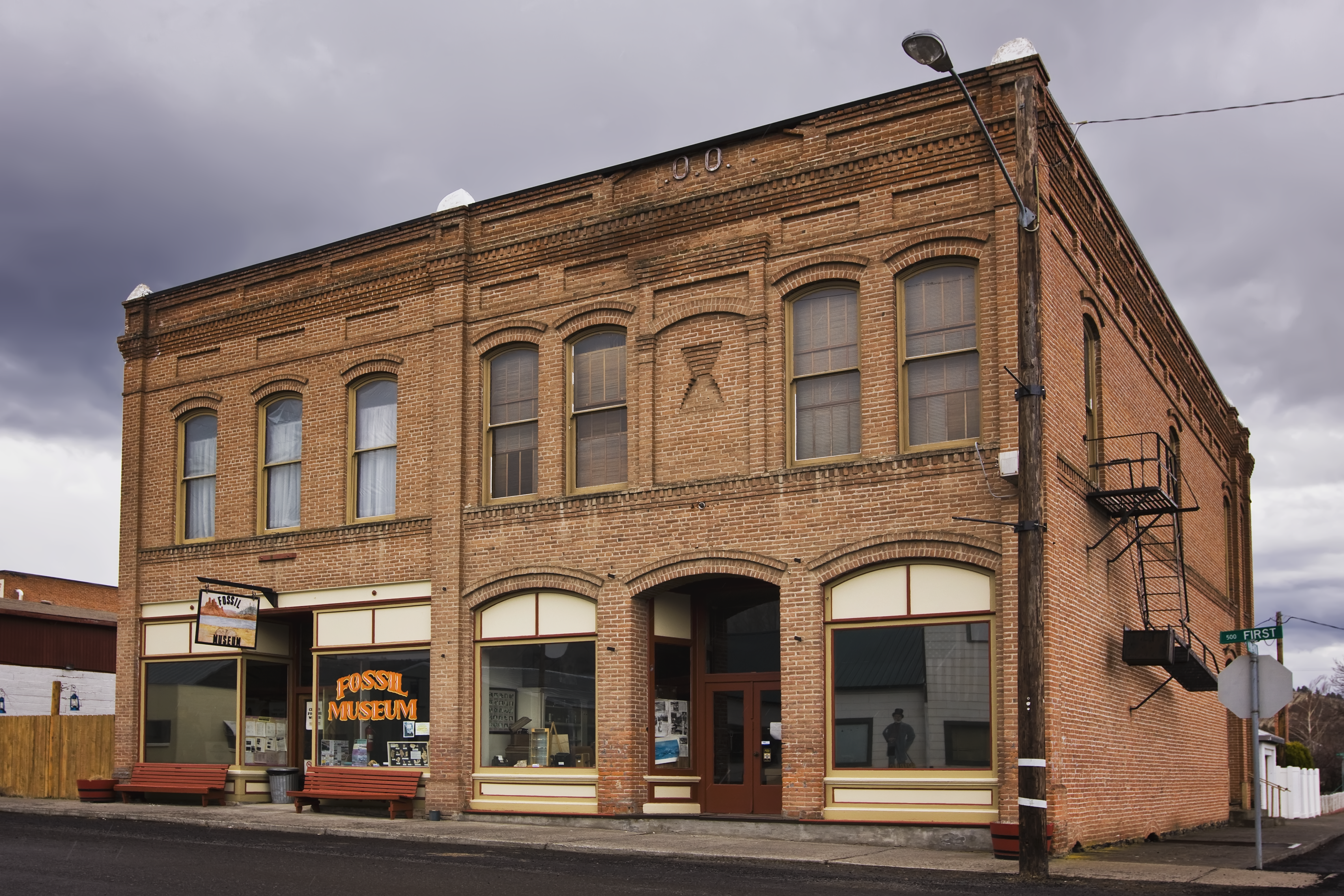
Fossil Museum

Fossil is the site of the only public fossil field in Oregon. The field is located behind Wheeler High School, where fossils of animals and plants such as the Metasequoia can be found. After the initial discovery of the fossil field in 1949 or 1950, access was free and unrestricted until 2005, when a small interpretive center was constructed, and a collection limit of three fossils was established in exchange for a $3 entry fee. The basic entry fee per person in 2011 is $5.

The Oregon Paleolands Institute (OPLI) headquarters and exhibition hall are in Fossil, near the courthouse. OPLI is an educational, community-based non-profit that offers tours, hikes, and workshops related to the region's geology and paleontology.

== Education ==
It is in the Fossil School District 21J. Wheeler High School and Fossil Elementary School are in Fossil. In the 2011−12 school year, about 50 students were enrolled in grades 7 through 12 and about 35 in kindergarten through grade 6.

The county is not a part of a community college district.

== Notable people ==
- Bill Bowerman, coach and co-founder of Nike, Inc. resided in Fossil during his boyhood, and prior to his death in 1999. He was a direct descendant of Thomas Benton Hoover, who established the Fossil post office.

== See also ==
- Thomas Benton Hoover House
