= Wheeler County, Oregon =

County in Oregon, United States

- County
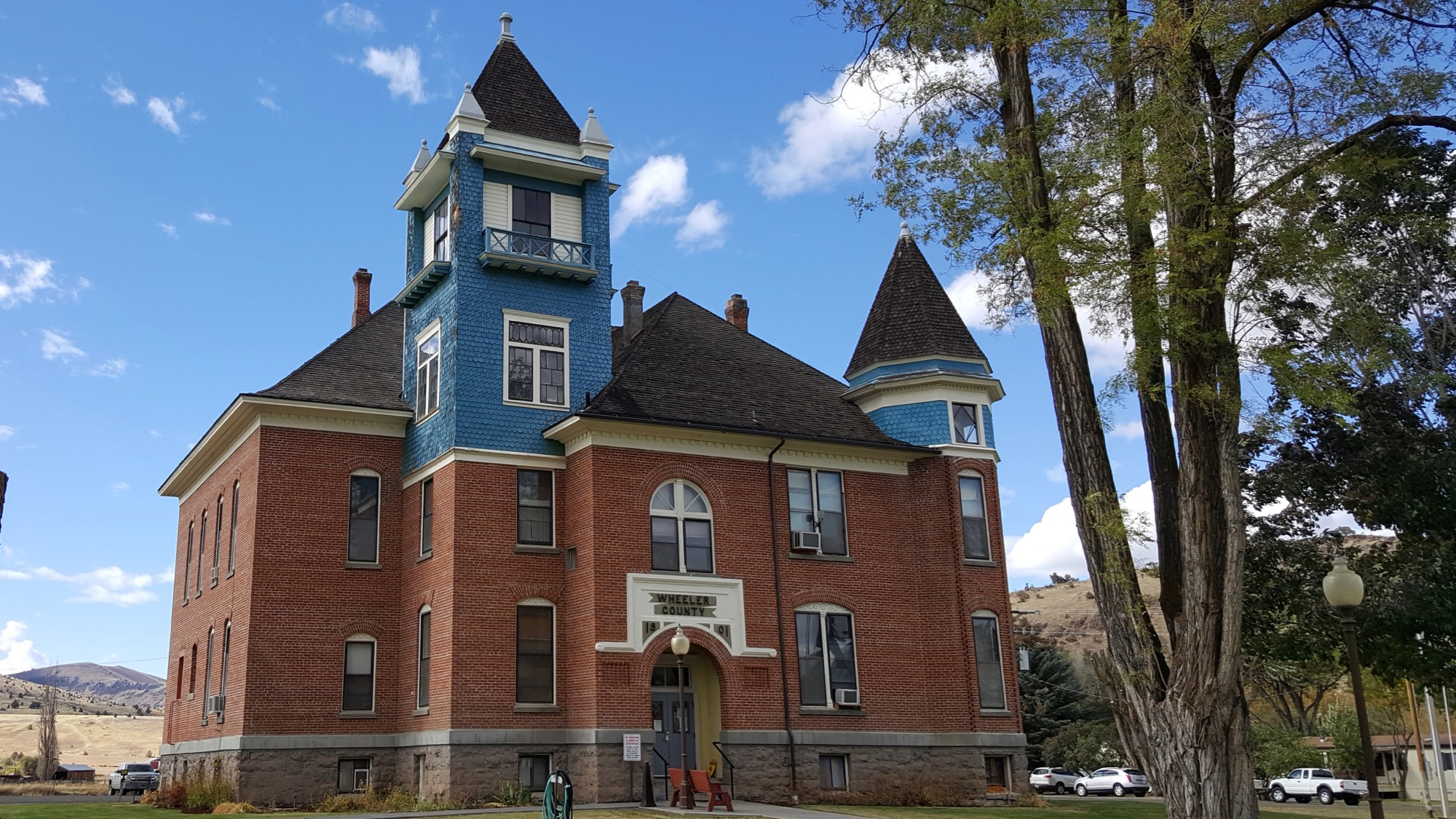
- Wheeler County Courthouse in Fossil

- Location within the U.S. state of Oregon
- Coordinates: 44°44′N 120°01′W
- Country: United States
- State: Oregon
- Founded: February 17, 1899
- Named for: Henry H. Wheeler
- Seat: Fossil
- Largest city: Fossil

Area
  - Total: 1,715 sq mi (4,440 km^{2})
  - Land: 1,715 sq mi (4,440 km^{2})
  - Water: 0.5 sq mi (1.3 km^{2}) 0.03%

Population (2020)
  - Total: 1,451
  - Estimate (2025): 1,472 ▲
  - Density: 0.8/sq mi (0.31/km^{2})
- Time zone: UTC−8 (Pacific)
  - Summer (DST): UTC−7 (PDT)
- Congressional district: 2nd
- Website: www.wheelercountyoregon.com

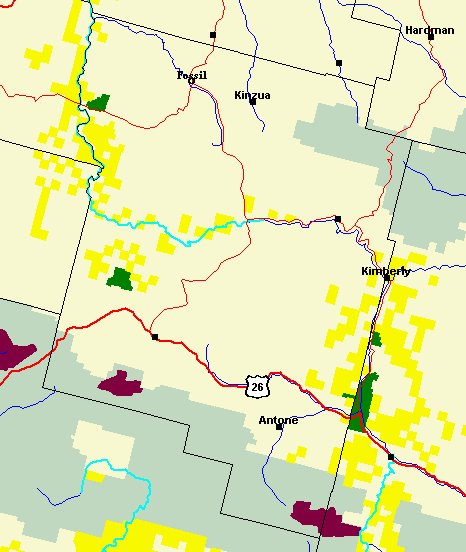
U.S. Forest Service land Bureau of Land Management land National Park Service land Wilderness area

Wheeler County is a county in the U.S. state of Oregon. As of the 2020 census, the population was 1,451, making it Oregon's least populous county. It is named in honor of Henry H. Wheeler. an early settler who owned a farm near Mitchell. The county seat is Fossil, and Wheeler County is known for having Oregon's largest deposit of fossils.

== History ==
Wheeler County was created on February 17, 1899, from parts of Grant, Gilliam, and Crook Counties. There have been no boundary changes since its creation. Fossil was designated the temporary county seat at the time of the county's creation. In 1900 there was an election to determine the permanent county seat between the three towns of the county, which ended with Fossil winning the election.

Henry H. Wheeler (born September 7, 1826, Erie County, Pennsylvania - died March 26, 1915, Mitchell, Oregon) arrived in Oregon in 1862, moved around, and settled near Mitchell, Oregon. He married Dorcas L. Monroe on December 19, 1875.

== Geography ==
According to the United States Census Bureau, the county has a total area of 1,715 square miles (4,440 km^{2}), of which 1,715 square miles (4,440 km^{2}) is land and 0.5 square miles (1.3 km^{2}) (0.03%) is water.

=== Adjacent counties ===
- Gilliam County - north
- Morrow County - northeast
- Grant County - east
- Crook County - south
- Jefferson County - west
- Wasco County - northwest

=== National Protected Areas ===
- John Day Fossil Beds National Monument (part)
- Ochoco National Forest (part)
- Umatilla National Forest (part)

=== Major highways ===
- U.S. Route 26
- Oregon Route 19

== Demographics ==
Historical population
Census	Pop.	Note	%±
1900	2,443		—
1910	2,484		1.7%
1920	2,791		12.4%
1930	2,799		0.3%
1940	2,974		6.3%
1950	3,313		11.4%
1960	2,722		−17.8%
1970	1,849		−32.1%
1980	1,513		−18.2%
1990	1,396		−7.7%
2000	1,547		10.8%
2010	1,441		−6.9%
2020	1,451		0.7%
2025 (est.)	1,472	▲	1.4%
U.S. Decennial Census; 1790–1960 1900–1990; 1990–2000 2010–2019

=== 2020 census ===
Wheeler County, Oregon – Racial and ethnic composition Note: the US Census treats Hispanic/Latino as an ethnic category. This table excludes Latinos from the racial categories and assigns them to a separate category. Hispanics/Latinos may be of any race.
Race / Ethnicity (NH = Non-Hispanic)	Pop 1980	Pop 1990	Pop 2000	Pop 2010	Pop 2020	% 1980	% 1990	% 2000	% 2010	% 2020
White alone (NH)	1,496	1,370	1,431	1,307	1,256	98.88%	98.14%	92.50%	90.70%	86.56%
Black or African American alone (NH)	0	1	1	0	1	0.00%	0.07%	0.06%	0.00%	0.07%
Native American or Alaska Native alone (NH)	4	11	8	16	17	0.26%	0.79%	0.52%	1.11%	1.17%
Asian alone (NH)	2	2	4	8	8	0.13%	0.14%	0.26%	0.56%	0.55%
Native Hawaiian or Pacific Islander alone (NH)	x	x	0	2	0	x	x	0.00%	0.14%	0.00%
Other race alone (NH)	4	0	0	5	1	0.26%	0.00%	0.00%	0.35%	0.07%
Mixed race or Multiracial (NH)	x	x	24	41	84	x	x	1.55%	2.85%	5.79%
Hispanic or Latino (any race)	7	12	79	62	84	0.46%	0.86%	5.11%	4.30%	5.79%
Total	1,513	1,396	1,547	1,441	1,451	100.00%	100.00%	100.00%	100.00%	100.00%

As of the 2020 census, the county had a population of 1,451. Of the residents, 16.1% were under the age of 18 and 35.0% were 65 years of age or older; the median age was 55.9 years. For every 100 females there were 93.2 males, and for every 100 females age 18 and over there were 89.3 males. 0.0% of residents lived in urban areas and 100.0% lived in rural areas.

The racial makeup of the county was 87.6% White, 0.1% Black or African American, 1.8% American Indian and Alaska Native, 0.6% Asian, 0.0% Native Hawaiian and Pacific Islander, 1.7% from some other race, and 8.3% from two or more races. Hispanic or Latino residents of any race comprised 5.8% of the population.

There were 686 households in the county, of which 21.4% had children under the age of 18 living with them and 28.3% had a female householder with no spouse or partner present. About 32.0% of all households were made up of individuals and 21.3% had someone living alone who was 65 years of age or older.

There were 935 housing units, of which 26.6% were vacant. Among occupied housing units, 67.8% were owner-occupied and 32.2% were renter-occupied. The homeowner vacancy rate was 0.2% and the rental vacancy rate was 3.9%.

=== 2010 census ===
As of the 2010 census, there were 1,441 people, 651 households, and 408 families living in the county. The population density was 0.8 inhabitants per square mile (0.31/km^{2}). There were 895 housing units at an average density of 0.5 units per square mile (0.19 units/km^{2}). The racial makeup of the county was 92.4% white, 1.2% American Indian, 0.6% Asian, 0.1% Pacific islander, 2.6% from other races, and 3.1% from two or more races. Those of Hispanic or Latino origin made up 4.3% of the population. In terms of ancestry, 28.4% were German, 24.0% were English, 20.0% were Irish, and 8.4% were American.

Of the 651 households, 20.3% had children under the age of 18 living with them, 51.9% were married couples living together, 7.2% had a female householder with no husband present, 37.3% were non-families, and 32.4% of all households were made up of individuals. The average household size was 2.18 and the average family size was 2.70. The median age was 53.0 years.

The median income for a household in the county was $33,403 and the median income for a family was $43,167. Males had a median income of $36,328 versus $31,792 for females. The per capita income for the county was $20,598. About 9.1% of families and 11.4% of the population were below the poverty line, including 12.0% of those under age 18 and 5.7% of those age 65 or over.

=== 2000 census ===
As of the 2000 census, there were 1,547 people, 653 households, and 444 families living in the county. The population density was 1 people per square mile (0.39 people/km^{2}). There were 842 housing units at an average density of 0 units per square mile (0/km^{2}). The racial makeup of the county was 93.34% White, 0.06% Black or African American, 0.84% Native American, 0.26% Asian, 0.06% Pacific Islander, 3.49% from other races, and 1.94% from two or more races. 5.11% of the population were Hispanic or Latino of any race. 20.6% were of German, 18.0% English, 13.6% American, 8.2% Irish and 6.9% Scottish ancestry.

There were 653 households, out of which 21.30% had children under the age of 18 living with them, 62.20% were married couples living together, 4.00% had a female householder with no husband present, and 31.90% were non-families. 27.40% of all households were made up of individuals, and 13.30% had someone living alone who was 65 years of age or older. The average household size was 2.32 and the average family size was 2.76.

In the county, the population was spread out, with 22.70% under the age of 18, 3.40% from 18 to 24, 19.30% from 25 to 44, 31.40% from 45 to 64, and 23.30% who were 65 years of age or older. The median age was 48 years. For every 100 females there were 102.20 males. For every 100 females age 18 and over, there were 97.00 males.

The median income for a household in the county was $28,750, and the median income for a family was $34,048. Males had a median income of $29,688 versus $22,361 for females. The per capita income for the county was $15,884. About 12.70% of families and 15.60% of the population were below the poverty line, including 22.20% of those under age 18 and 4.20% of those age 65 or over.

== Politics ==
United States presidential election results for Wheeler County, Oregon
Year	Republican		Democratic		Third party(ies)	
Year	No.	%	No.	%	No.	%
1900	426	62.01%	243	35.37%	18	2.62%
1904	462	69.58%	161	24.25%	41	6.17%
1908	418	61.65%	236	34.81%	24	3.54%
1912	307	44.75%	222	32.36%	157	22.89%
1916	629	51.73%	570	46.88%	17	1.40%
1920	797	76.56%	212	20.37%	32	3.07%
1924	685	68.43%	213	21.28%	103	10.29%
1928	677	75.06%	224	24.83%	1	0.11%
1932	519	44.55%	632	54.25%	14	1.20%
1936	502	42.18%	663	55.71%	25	2.10%
1940	705	51.84%	652	47.94%	3	0.22%
1944	544	56.55%	414	43.04%	4	0.42%
1948	414	49.23%	411	48.87%	16	1.90%
1952	719	60.52%	468	39.39%	1	0.08%
1956	605	51.53%	569	48.47%	0	0.00%
1960	566	54.84%	466	45.16%	0	0.00%
1964	340	42.61%	458	57.39%	0	0.00%
1968	443	58.14%	292	38.32%	27	3.54%
1972	474	60.31%	267	33.97%	45	5.73%
1976	355	45.57%	402	51.60%	22	2.82%
1980	442	54.70%	282	34.90%	84	10.40%
1984	504	66.58%	253	33.42%	0	0.00%
1988	367	54.53%	274	40.71%	32	4.75%
1992	357	41.51%	267	31.05%	236	27.44%
1996	418	47.83%	299	34.21%	157	17.96%
2000	584	69.44%	202	24.02%	55	6.54%
2004	612	69.55%	245	27.84%	23	2.61%
2008	498	61.33%	281	34.61%	33	4.06%
2012	545	63.52%	266	31.00%	47	5.48%
2016	591	72.25%	155	18.95%	72	8.80%
2020	711	73.68%	217	22.49%	37	3.83%
2024	618	71.20%	210	24.19%	40	4.61%

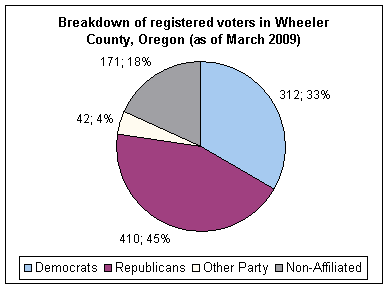
Wheeler County voters

Though Wheeler County is located in central Oregon, it politically falls in line with the eastern side of the state. The majority of registered voters who are part of a political party in Wheeler County, as well as most counties in eastern Oregon, are members of the Republican Party. The county has only voted Democratic in four presidential elections following its formation. The last Democrat to win a majority in the county was Jimmy Carter in 1976. No Democrat has won over 40 percent of the vote in Wheeler County since 1988, with that election having been heavily influenced by drought.

In the 2008 presidential election, 61.33% of Wheeler County voters voted for Republican John McCain, while 34.61% voted for Democrat Barack Obama and 4.06% of voters either voted for a third-party candidate or wrote in a candidate. In the 2004 presidential election, 69.5% of Wheeler Country voters voted for George W. Bush, while 27.8% voted for John Kerry, and 2.7% of voters either voted for a third-party candidate or wrote in a candidate.

In the 2016 presidential election, 72.25 percent of voters went for Republican Donald Trump, 18.95 percent for Democrat Hillary Clinton, 5.62 percent for Libertarian Gary Johnson, and the remainder were either write-ins or voted for other candidates. In the 2012 presidential election, 63.52 percent of voters went for Mitt Romney, 31.00 percent for Obama and 5.48 percent for other candidates.

== Economy ==
Principal industries in this county are agriculture, livestock, and lumber.

== Communities ==
=== Cities ===
- Fossil (county seat)
- Mitchell
- Spray

=== Unincorporated communities ===
- Clarno
- Richmond
- Service Creek
- Spoos Mill
- Twickenham
- Waterman
- City of Wheeler (had a post office Aug 1890-Sept 1895)
- Winlock

=== Former communities ===
- Antone
- Kinzua
- Wetmore

== Education ==
School districts include:

- Condon School District 25J
- Dayville School District 16J
- Fossil School District 21J
- Mitchell School District 55
- Spray School District 1

The county is not a part of a community college district.

== See also ==
- National Register of Historic Places listings in Wheeler County, Oregon
- Winlock W. Steiwer
